= Émile Gilliéron fils =

Swiss artist (1885–1939)

- In the Basilica of Saint Demetrios, Thessaloniki, 1918
- Born: Edouard Émile Gilliéron; 14 July 1885; Athens
- Died: 30 September 1939 (aged 54); Athens
- Citizenship: Swiss
- Education: Polytechnic School, Athens; Académie Colarossi, Paris; École Supérieure des Beaux-Arts, Paris
- Relatives: Émile Gilliéron père (father); Jules Gilliéron (uncle)

Edouard Émile Gilliéron (14 July 1885 – 30 September 1939), known as Émile Gilliéron fils to distinguish him from his father, was a Swiss artist who worked largely in the restoration and replication of works of ancient art.

Gilliéron was born in Athens, where his father (known as Émile Gilliéron père) worked as an artist and architectural draughtsman. After studying art in Athens and Paris, he began to work on archaeological sites with his father from his early twenties. He had a long collaboration with the British archaeologist Arthur Evans on the latter's excavations of the Minoan site of Knossos on Crete, and elsewhere worked at Palaikastro and Zakros on Crete under Robert Carr Bosanquet, under Pierre Amandry at Delphi, and for Alan Wace and Georg Karo on finds from Mycenae. His other projects included replicating items of ancient jewellery in Egypt, and visiting Thessaloniki to restore Byzantine artworks destroyed by the Great Fire of 1917.

Gilliéron père transferred an increasing amount of his work to his son, and renamed his company to Gilliéron et fils ('Gilliéron and Son') around 1909–1910. Gilliéron fils, whose wife collaborated on the pair's reconstructions, extended the business's clientele outside Europe to Cuba and the United States, improving the commercial fortunes of the company. In 1925, Gilliéron was given the honorary title of "Artistic Director of All the Museums of the Greek Nation". As well as archaeological illustrations and replicas, he designed Greek coins and bank notes. He was also artistic director of the National Archaeological Museum in Athens, where he reorganised the collection of restorations, and he advised several museums outside Greece on the display of their Mycenaean artefacts.

Gilliéron has been credited, along with his father, with a prominent role in creating the popular image of Minoan civilisation, and in furthering the study of ancient Greek sculpture, particularly around the use of colour on statues. They have also been accused of forging antiquities or facilitating the illicit trade in forged and looted artefacts. Gilliéron is sometimes cited as the maker of the Ring of Nestor, a gold ring purportedly of Minoan origin whose authenticity has been debated, and reported to have claimed other ancient artefacts as his own forgeries. The reconstructions of ancient frescoes he created with his father were often highly imaginative, and combined pieces of distinct compositions into single images: modern scholars have questioned how far they represent original Minoan works, as opposed to modern re-imaginings.

== Biography ==
Edouard Émile Gilliéron was born in Athens on 14 July 1885, where his father (known as Émile Gilliéron père) lived permanently as an artist. He was a citizen of the Swiss town of Corcelles-le-Jorat. The Gilliéron family were originally French Protestants from the south-eastern Dauphiné region of France, who fled from religious persecution to Geneva in the eighteenth century.

Gilliéron fils initially studied art under his father, then at the Polytechnic School in Athens around 1902–1906. He continued his training in Paris at the Académie Colarossi and at the city's École Supérieure des Beaux-Arts, (Note: Lapatin states that the two institutions were the École Superieur and the Académie de la Grande Chaumière.) where his father had also studied. At the École Supérieure, which he attended between 1906 and around 1909–1910, he was an apprentice in the studio of Fernand Cormon. Gilliéron began to work with his father in his early twenties, working with him on the excavations of Arthur Evans at the Minoan site of Knossos on Crete from at least 1907, (Note: According to Herschman, he was working for Evans before his fifteenth birthday, which was in 1900.) and at some point before 1910 at Demetrias in Thessaly. From 1907 onwards, he produced several versions of the Prince of the Lilies fresco for display at the site; his final restoration was created in 1926. (Note: For Gilliéron fils as author of this specific version, see Shaw 2004, p. 66.) Evans constructed two new storeys, in reinforced concrete, above the anteroom of the palace's throne room, and used the lower (known as the "loggia") to display replicas of frescoes made by the two Gilliérons. Gilliéron fils remained employed at Knossos until the mid-1930s.

In 1910, Gilliéron worked for Robert Carr Bosanquet of the British School at Athens in his excavations of the Cretan sites of Palaikastro and Zakros. He worked frequently for the French School at Athens, particularly under Pierre Amandry in the excavations of Delphi. He continued to work with Evans at Knossos, restoring Minoan frescoes and painted panels, and for Alan Wace at Mycenae. Wace commissioned him in 1917 to re-draw a Mycenaean sword previously erroneously identified as a halberd, and in 1923 Gilliéron worked on the site's frescoes alongside Winifred Lamb, who had been Wace's second-in-charge for the preceding season's dig. (Note: Hood 1998, p. 24. On Lamb, see Galanakis 2007, p. 245.) In the winter of 1922–1923, he was sent to Egypt by the Metropolitan Museum of Art in New York to replicate items of ancient Egyptian jewellery found there. He was still working on this project in 1925, when he wrote to the Metropolitan Museum suggesting that he re-create objects from scratch, rather than using electrotyping to copy them.

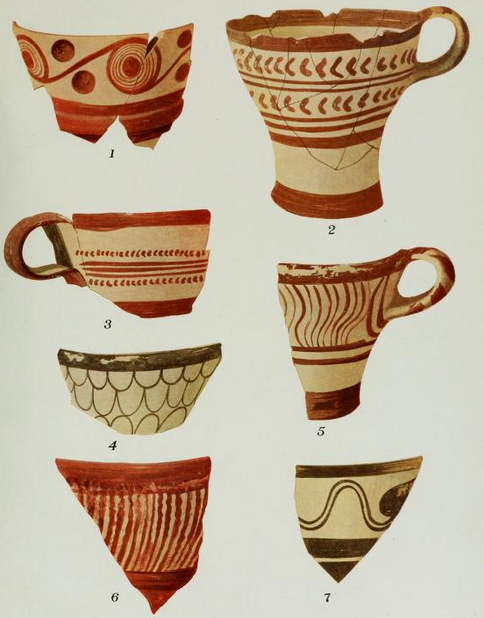
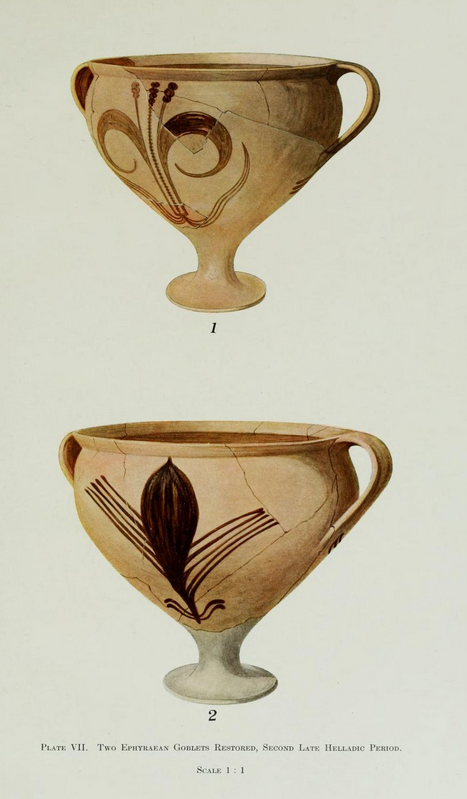
Late Helladic pottery from Korakou, painted in watercolour by Gilliéron for Carl Blegen's 1921 publication

Gilliéron père had worked since 1907 for the excavations of the Archaeological Society of Athens, directed by Apostolos Arvanitopoulos, at the Hellenistic city of Demetrias in Thessaly, producing watercolour copies of the painted funerary stelai from the site. His work continued until 1913; during his later trips to the site, Gilliéron fils accompanied his father; he continued to work for Arvanitopoulos until 1917, although the latter considered his work inferior to that of his father. Gilliéron fils went to Thessaloniki in the aftermath of the Great Fire of August 1917, where he restored several destroyed Byzantine artworks.

Over time, Gilliéron père transferred an increasing proportion of his work to his son, and renamed his business Gilliéron et fils ('Gilliéron and Son') around 1909–1910. Gilliéron fils has been credited by the archaeological historian Joan Mertens with improving the commercial success of their joint studio, and with extending its clientele to include patrons in Cuba and the United States as well as in Europe. Between 1906 and 1933, the Metropolitan Museum of Art purchased almost seven hundred artworks from the Gilliérons. Around 1918–1919, the Gilliérons replicated a painted stele discovered at Mycenae in 1893.

Gilliéron died suddenly on 30 September 1939, in Athens, at the age of 54.

== Artistic works ==
Among Gilliéron's restorations at Knossos was a replica of a fresco showing a bull in a landscape of olive trees, installed in the original fresco's location at the site, as well as one of a blue monkey in a field of papyrus, executed between 1923 and 1928. He also created replicas of the Vapheio cups, displayed in the Ashmolean Museum of Oxford University and Cambridge University's Fitzwilliam Museum, and executed watercolour paintings of the pottery found at the Bronze Age site of Korakou, published by Carl Blegen in 1921. Alongside his father, Gilliéron worked with Georg Karo on the publication of the finds from Heinrich Schliemann's 1876 excavations of Grave Circle A at Mycenae, which Karo published between 1930 and 1933. (Note: Marinatos 2020, pp. 76–77. Karo's publication is Karo 1930–1933.)

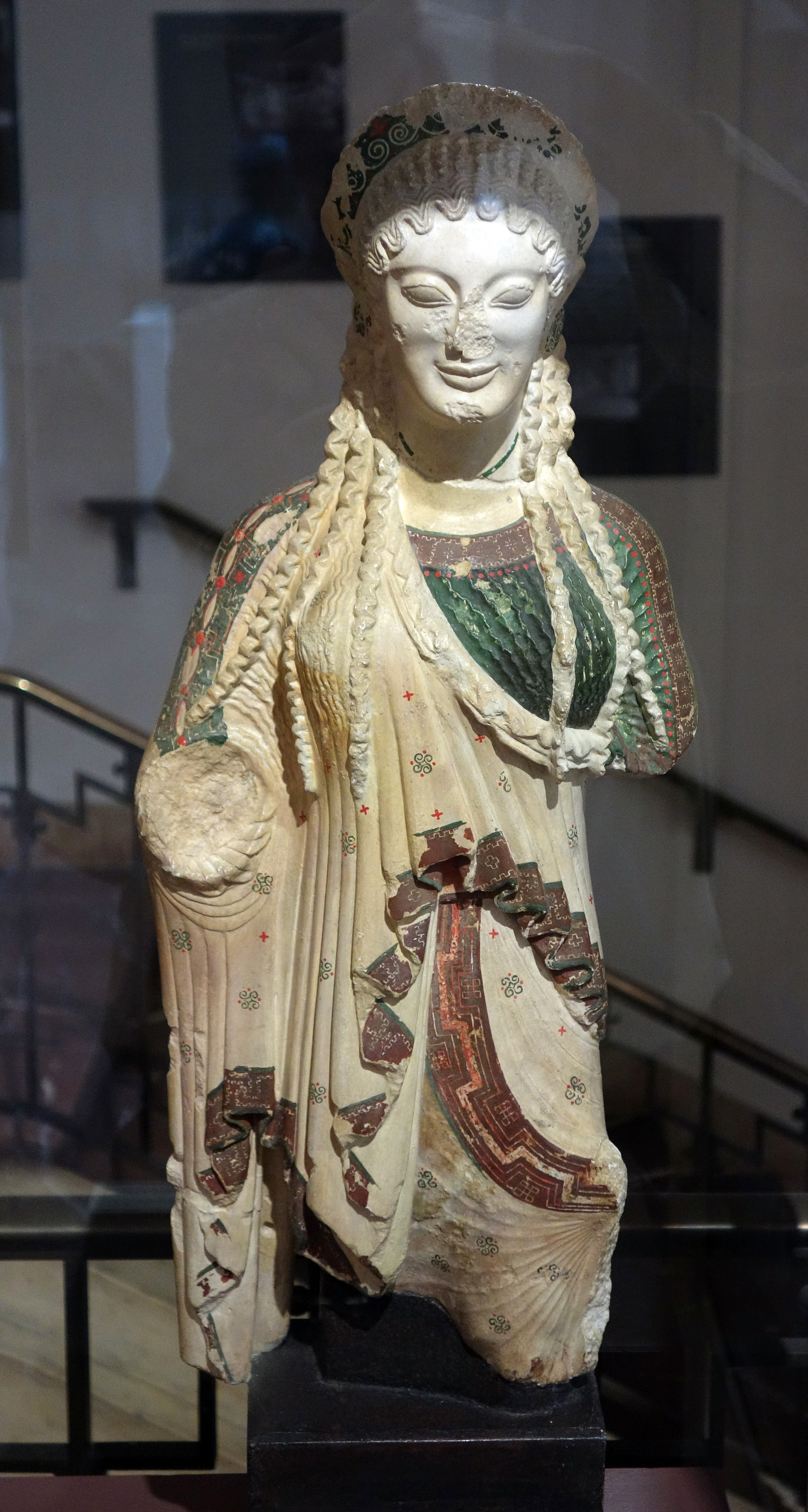
Cast of the Chios kore as painted by Gilliéron c. 1924

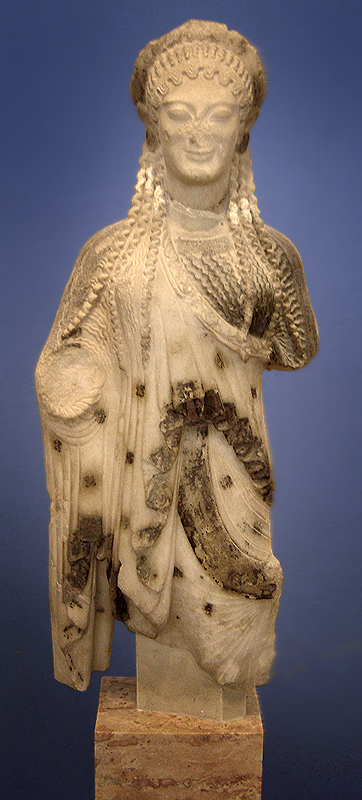
The original kore in 2005

Shortly after the excavation of the Chios kore (Note: Also known by its inventory number as "Acropolis kore 675".) in 1886, Gilliéron père made a watercolour of it, which Gilliéron fils used as the basis for a painted cast of the statue made around 1924: the cast allowed later scholars to study the colours of the statue's painted decoration, which have since deteriorated considerably. He drew reproductions of the wooden Pitsa panels, found by Anastasios Orlandos in 1934 in a cave near Corinth; Orlandos published these in 1935. (Note: Mitsopoulou 2021b, p. 42, with n. 108. For the objects' discovery, see Stager 2022, p. 90.)

Gilliéron's bills were often large: he charged Bosanquet 800 francs for his work at Palaikastro and Zakros, of which 125 constituted his hotel bill; his charges to Arthur Evans for his restoration of the Hagia Triada Sarcophagus were described as "exorbitant" by Rachel Hood in 1998, and attracted a letter of complaint from Evans.

In 1925, Gilliéron was given the honorary title of "Artistic Director of All the Museums of the Greek Nation". His other works included Greek coins and bank notes; he was also artistic director of the National Archaeological Museum in Athens, where he reorganised the collection of restorations, and he advised several museums outside Greece on the display of their Mycenaean artefacts. He sculpted (without charging a fee) a bronze bust of Evans, which was dedicated at Knossos in 1935.

== Assessment and legacy ==
Evans wrote of Gilliéron that he was "not only a competent artist, but one whose admirable studies of Minoan art in all its branches had thoroughly imbued him with its spirit". (Note: Quoted in Lapatin 2002, p. 138.) Lapatin credits Gilliéron and his father second only to Evans in creating the popular image of Knossos and Minoan society. The Gilliérons' prominent role in the reconstruction and publication of many of the most high-profile archaeological finds of their lifetime has led Mertens to conclude that "their images, in large measure, have defined our visual impressions of the great ancient cultures of the Greek world". In particular, their colourful reconstructions of archaic sculptures, whose painted colours could not at the time be shown by photography, played a major role in the developing interest of the public and of academics such as Gisela Richter and Edward Robinson in ancient polychromy.

Replicas produced by the Gilliéron company were purchased and displayed widely by European and American museums, as they were considerably cheaper than genuine ancient artefacts. Their work was acquired by London's South Kensington Museum, New York's Metropolitan Museum of Art, University College Dublin, the Winckelmann Institute of the Friedrich-Wilhelm University in Berlin, Harvard University, the University of Montpellier in France, the Museum of Fine Arts in Boston, the Ashmolean Museum of the University of Oxford and the Fitzwilliam Museum of the University of Cambridge. The finds which were disseminated through their reconstructions have been cited as an influence on modernist writers, artists and intellectuals such as James Joyce, Sigmund Freud and Pablo Picasso.

Both Gilliéron père and fils constructed frescoes out of fragments from originally distinct areas of Knossos, creating, in the words of a modern study, "a decorative programme which, as it currently stands, never existed". When the English writer Evelyn Waugh visited the site in 1929, he wrote that it was impossible to gain an appreciation of Minoan painting there, since original fragments of fresco were crowded out by modern restorations, and judged that Evans and the Gilliérons had "tempered their zeal for reconstruction with a predilection for the covers of Vogue". (Note: Waugh 1930, republished as Waugh 1946, pp. 51–52, quoted in MacGillivray 2000, p. 194.)

=== Accusations of archaeological criminality ===
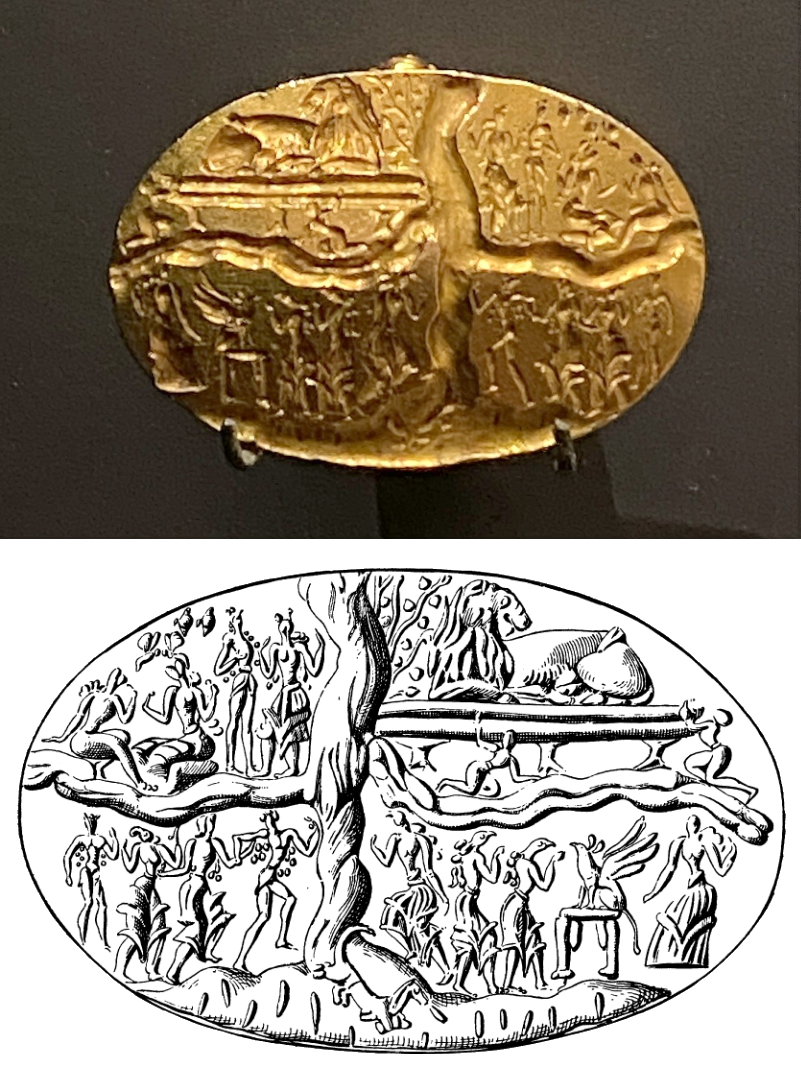
The Ring of Nestor (above) with a drawing of its impression made by Gilliéron

The Gilliérons have been accused of facilitating or participating in the creation and distribution of forged antiquities. While working with the Gilliérons on the Grave Circle A material, Karo came to suspect them of illicit activities. Lapatin suggests that a remark of Karo's about "the men behind the scenes ... [of] goldsmiths working to order as forgers" may have been a veiled reference to the Gilliérons.

The Ring of Nestor, purportedly a Minoan artefact taken from a tholos tomb at Kakovatos in Messenia some time before 1907, was suspected of being a forgery made by Gilliéron. In 1924, or possibly earlier, the ring was shown to the acquisitions committee of the National Archaeological Museum in Athens, of which Karo was a member. Following Karo's judgement, the committee rejected the ring as a forgery. Evans was subsequently informed of the ring's existence by somebody he described as "a trustworthy source" (and later "a friend"): Karo inferred that Evans was referring to Gilliéron. Nanno Marinatos endorsed this view in 2015, and Andreas Vlachopoulos called it "very possible" in 2020. The Swedish archaeologist Robin Hägg reported in the 1980s a rumour that Gilliéron had confessed to making the ring, and hearing of his authorship from others involved in its history.

The ring's authenticity remains debated: Gilliéron made a watercolour rendition of its design for Evans, which has been taken as evidence against his involvement in forging it by scholars who consider the reconstruction to misinterpret certain aspects of the iconography. Gilliéron has been reported as claiming to have forged the Archanes Ring and the Ring of Minos, both also reputedly Minoan, (Note: MacGillivray 2000, p. 290 (Archanes Ring); Krzyszkowska 2005, p. 336.) and has been conjectured as a possible forger of the Phaistos Disc, another artefact of disputed provenance.

== Personal life ==
Gilliéron's wife, Ernesta (née Rossi), was also a painter; her father, an Italian, had made carriages for the royal family of Italy. Rossi was involved in creating reproductions alongside her husband and father-in-law: she made a watercolour version of the "Blue Boy" fresco, ultimately rejected for publication, which followed Gilliéron père's error in restoring the "boy" as a human figure rather than a monkey. (Note: Gilliéron fils reconstructed a similar fresco, unearthed in 1923, with a monkey.) Their son, Alfred, was born in the early 1920s and became a sculptor and craftsman. (Note: Hood 1998, p. 25. Hood gives the date as 1920; Mitsopoulou gives it as 1924.) He trained as an artist under Gilliéron, and his work included replicas of archaeological finds.

== Selected works and restorations ==
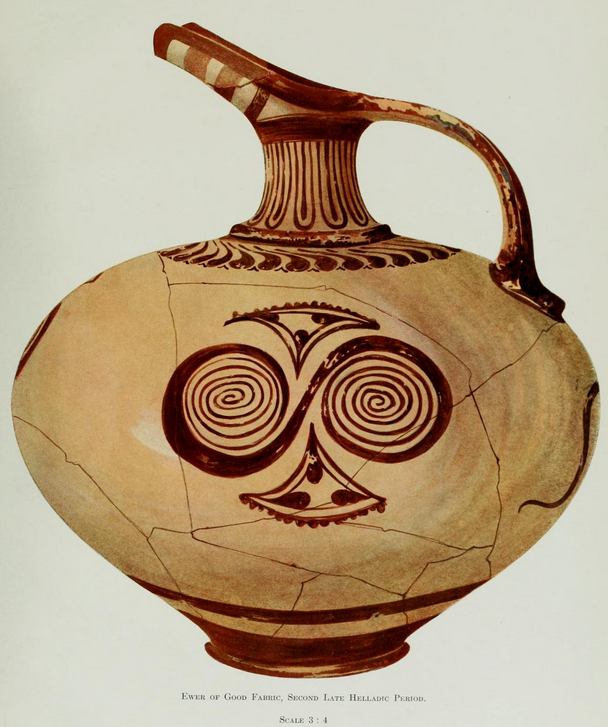
A Late Helladic ewer from Korakou, painted in watercolour by Gilliéron and published in 1921

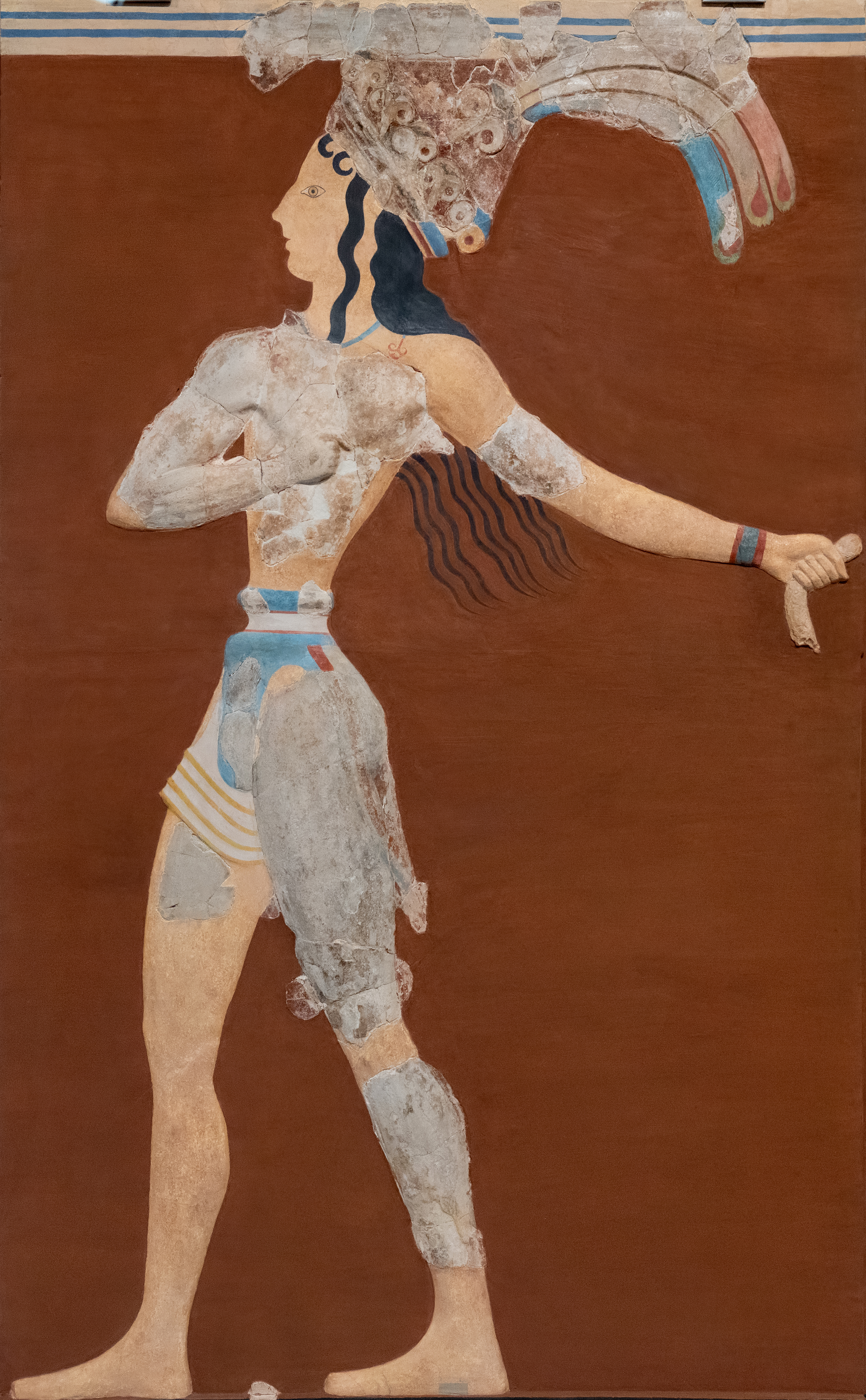
The "Prince of the Lilies" fresco at Knossos, as restored by Gilliéron in 1926 with original pieces of painted plaster (Note: For Gilliéron fils as author of this specific version, see Shaw 2004, p. 66.)

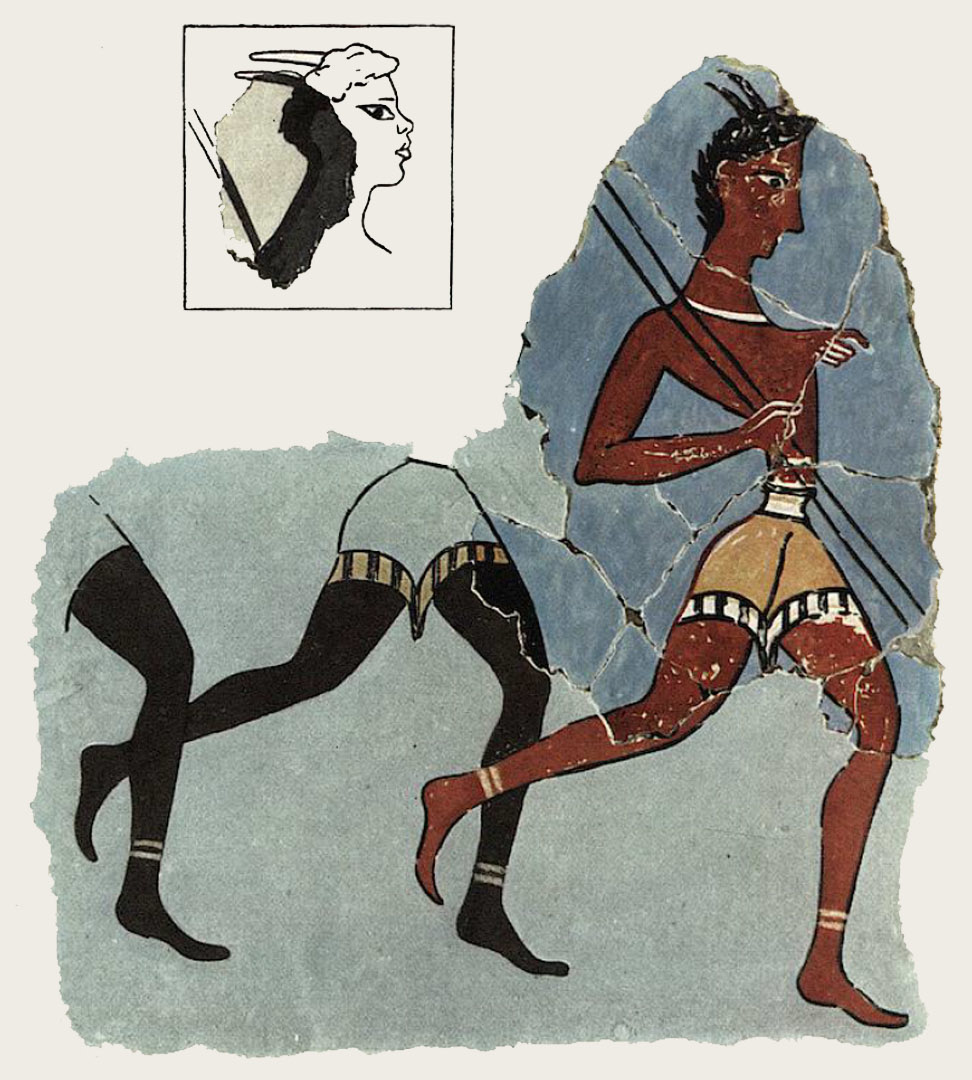
The "Captain of the Blacks" fresco from Knossos, as restored by Gilliéron; the dark-skinned figure at far left is entirely conjectural.

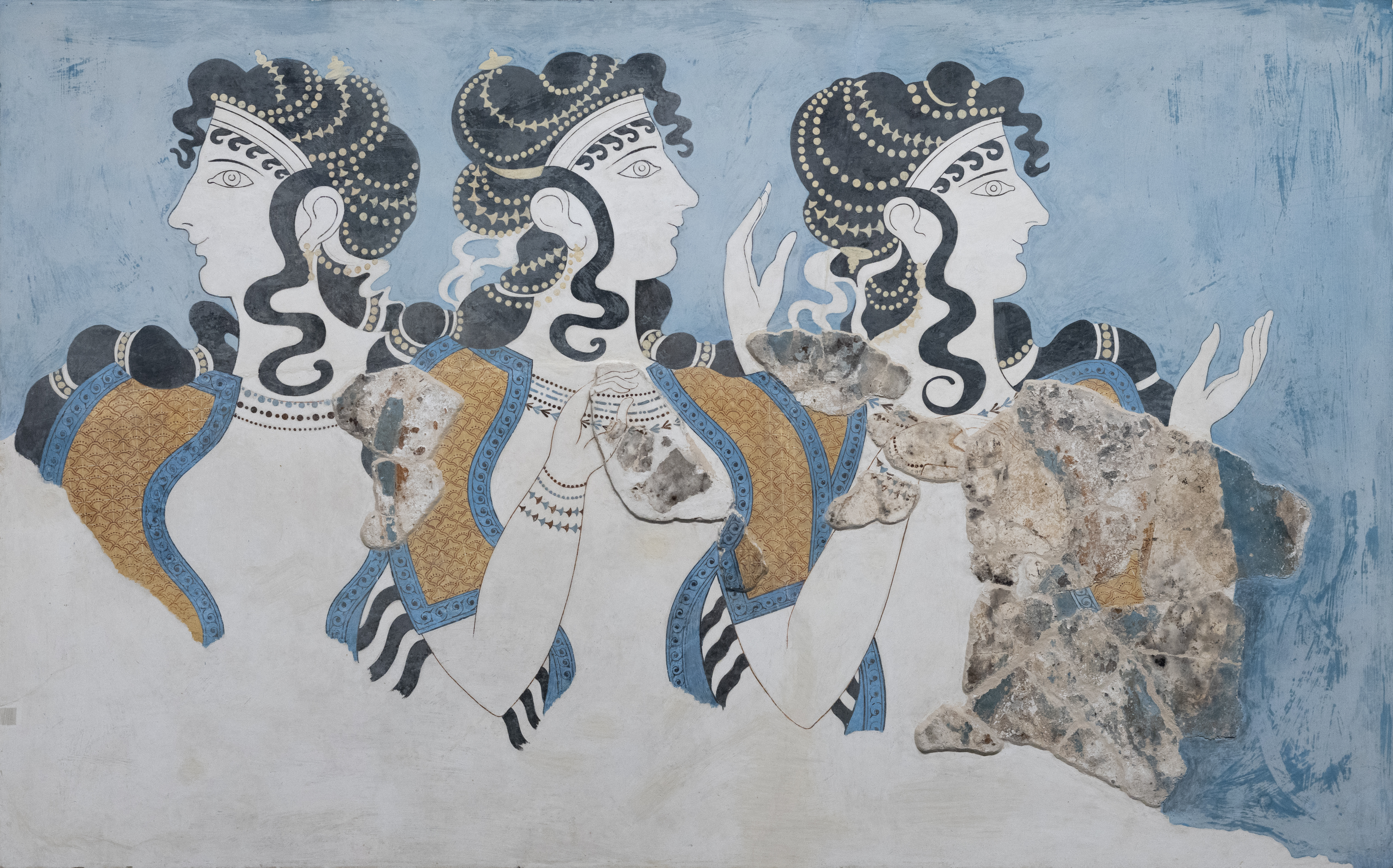
Gilliéron pere's recreation of the fresco known as the "Ladies in Blue", Knossos, re-restored after an earthquake by Gilliéron fils in 1927

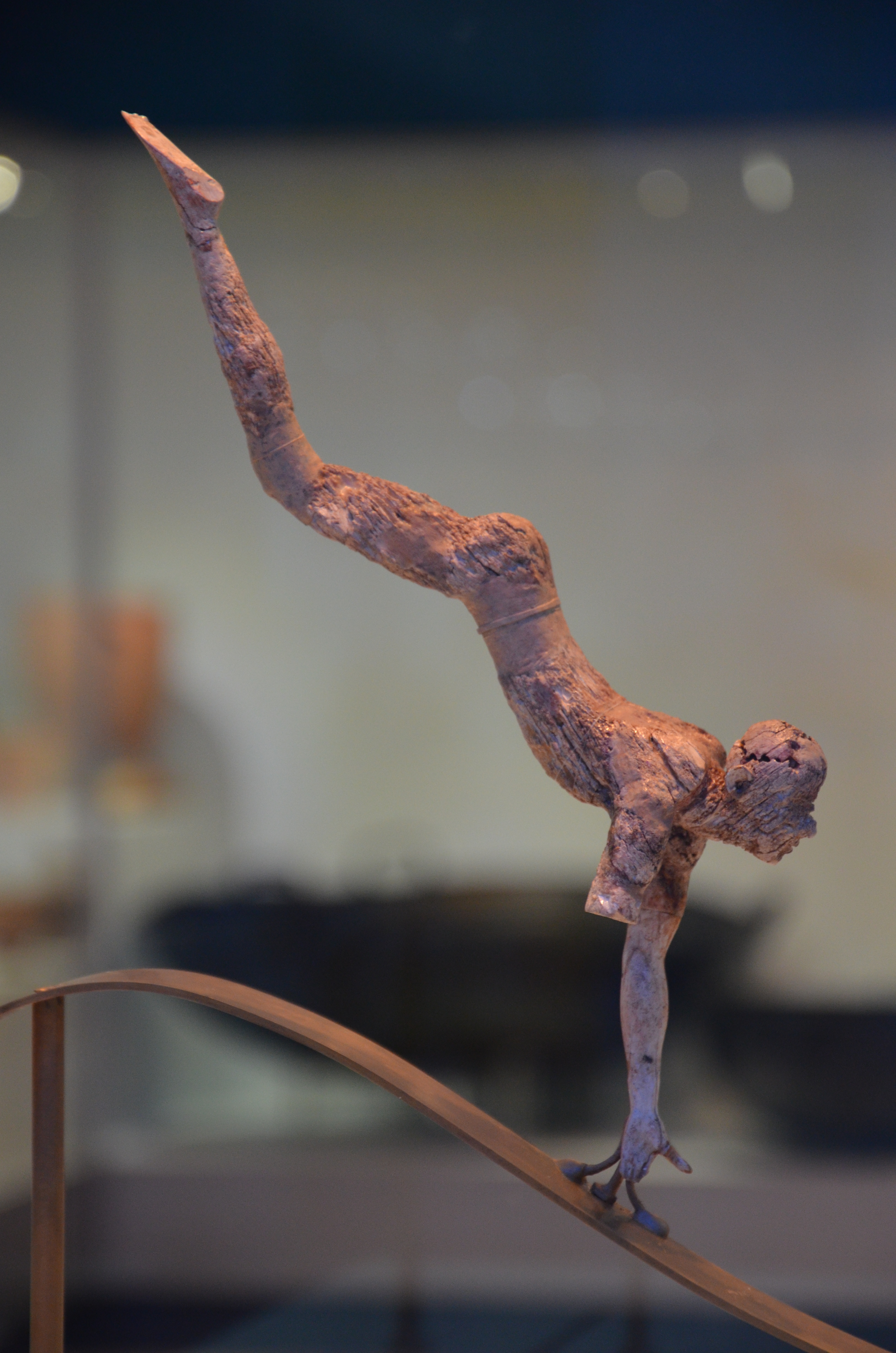
An ivory figure from Knossos, reconstructed to show an athlete in the act of bull-leaping, reputedly by Gilliéron

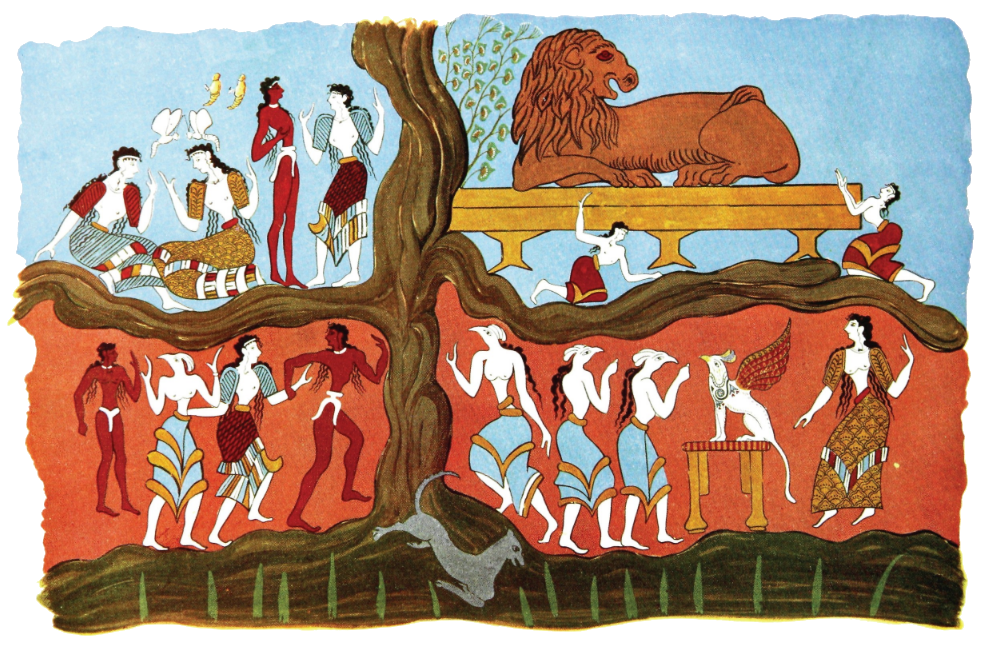
Gilliéron's rendering of the Ring of Nestor's impression in the style of a Minoan fresco, published by Evans in 1930

== Works cited ==
- Arvanitopoulos, Apostolos (1928). Γραπταὶ στῆλαι Δημητριάδος–Παγασῶν [Painted Stelai of Demetrias–Pagasai]. Library of the Archaeological Society of Athens 23 (in Greek). Athens. doi:10.11588/diglit.4899.
- Brons, Cecilie (2021). "The Colours of Ancient Greek Dress". In Batten, Alicia J.; Olson, Kelly (eds.). Dress in Mediterranean Antiquity: Greeks, Romans, Jews, Christians. London: Bloomsbury. pp. 77–94. ISBN 978-0-567-68465-3.
- Brouwers, Josho (9 February 2022). "Africans in Bronze Age Crete? The 'Captain of the Blacks' Fresco from Knossos". Ancient World Magazine. Archived from the original on 16 June 2025.
- Cohon, Robert (2010). "Forgeries, Artistic". In Gagarin, Michael (ed.). The Oxford Encyclopedia of Ancient Greece and Rome. Vol. 1. Oxford: Oxford University Press. pp. 201–205. ISBN 978-0-19-517072-6 – via Oxford Reference.
- Eisenberg, Jerome M. (2008). "The Phaistos Disk: A 100-Year-Old Hoax? Addenda, Corrigenda, and Comments" (PDF). Minerva. pp. 15–16. ISSN 0957-7718.
- Galanakis, Yannis; Tsitsa, Efi; Günkel-Maschek, Ute (2017). "The Power of Images: Re-Examining the Wall Paintings from the Throne Room at Knossos". Annual of the British School at Athens. 112: 47–98. doi:10.1017/S0068245417000065. ISSN 0068-2454.
- Galanakis, Yannis (2007). "The Construction of the Aegisthus Tholos Tomb at Mycenae and the 'Helladic Heresy'". Annual of the British School at Athens. 102: 239–256. doi:10.1017/S0068245400021481. ISSN 0068-2454. JSTOR 30245251. S2CID 162590402.
- Gere, Cathy (2009). Knossos and the Prophets of Modernism. Chicago: The University of Chicago Press. doi:10.7208/9780226289557 (inactive 28 May 2026). ISBN 978-0-226-28954-0.
- Hemingway, Séan (7 May 2011). "Historic Images of the Greek Bronze Age". Metropolitan Museum of Art. Archived from the original on 17 March 2016.
- Herschman, Rachel (2017). "Introduction" (PDF). In Chi, Jennifer Y. (ed.). Restoring the Minoans: Elizabeth Price and Sir Arthur Evans. Princeton University Press. pp. 16–33. ISBN 978-0-691-17869-1.
- Hood, Rachel (1998). Faces of Archaeology in Greece: Caricatures by Piet de Jong. Oxford: Leopard's Head. ISBN 0-904920-38-0.
- Lapatin, Kenneth D. S. (2002). Mysteries of the Snake Goddess: Art, Desire and the Forging of History. Boston: Houghton Mifflin. ISBN 0-618-14475-7 – via Internet Archive.
- Karo, Georg (1930–1933). Die Schachtgräber von Mykenai [The Shaft Graves of Mycenae] (in German). Munich: F. Bruckmann. OCLC 4322356 – via Heidelberg University Library.
- Krzyszkowska, Olga (2005). Aegean Seals: An Introduction. Bulletin of the Institute of Classical Studies Supplements. Vol. 85. University of London Press. ISBN 978-0-900587-97-9.
- MacGillivray, Joseph Alexander (2000). Minotaur: Sir Arthur Evans and the Archaeology of the Minoan Myth. New York: Hill and Wang. ISBN 978-0-8090-3035-4.
- Marinatos, Nanno; Jackson, Briana (2011). "The Pseudo-Minoan Nestor Ring and Its Egyptian Iconography". Journal of Ancient Egyptian Interconnections. 3 (2): 17–27. ISSN 1944-2815.
- Marinatos, Nanno (2015). "On the Authenticity of the 'Minos Ring': Evidence from Spyridon Marinatos's Archives". In Panagiotopoulos, Diamantis (ed.). Ein Minoer im Exil: Festschrift für Wolf-Dietrich Niemeier [A Minoan in Exile: Festschrift for Wolf-Dietrich Niemeier]. Universitätsforschungen zur Prähistorischen Archäologie. Vol. 270. Bonn: Dr. Rudolf Habelt GmbH. pp. 271–280. ISBN 978-3-7749-3971-4.
- Marinatos, Nanno (2020). Sir Arthur Evans and Minoan Crete. London: Bloomsbury. ISBN 978-1-350-19735-0.
- Mertens, Joan R. (2019). "Watercolors of the Acropolis: Émile Gilliéron in Athens". In Mertens, Joan R. & Conte, Lisa (eds.). Watercolors of the Acropolis: Émile Gilliéron in Athens (PDF). New York: Metropolitan Museum of Art. pp. 1–26. ISBN 978-1-58839-670-9.
- Mitsopoulou, Christina (2021a). "L'atelier des Gilliéron: Une fabrique de l'imagerie nationale grecque" [The atelier of Gilliéron: A workshop for Greek national imagery]. In Martinez, Jean-Luc (ed.). Paris–Athènes: Naissance de la Grèce moderne, 1675–1919 [Paris–Athens: The Birth of Modern Greece, 1675–1919] (in French). Paris: Hazan. pp. 262–289. ISBN 978-2-7541-1383-0.
- Mitsopoulou, Christina (2021b). "Der Künstler Émile Gilliéron und seine Werke: Zur Vermittlung archäologischer Forschungsergebnisse an den Beispielen der Aquarellkopien aus Pompeji, Herculaneum, und Demetrias" [The artist Émile Gilliéron and His Works: On the Communication of Archaeological Research Results Using the Examples of Watercolor Copies from Pompeii, Herculaneum, and Demetrias]. In Lehmann, Stephan (ed.). Die Aquarellkopien antiker Wand- und Marmorbilder im Archäologischen Museum von Émile Gilliéron u. a. [The Watercolor Copies of Ancient Wall- and Marble-Paintings in the Archaeological Museum by Émile Gilliéron et al.]. Kataloge und Schriften des archäologischen Museums der Martin-Luther-Universität (in German). Dresden: Sandstein Verlag. pp. 33–65. ISBN 978-3-95498-618-7.
- Mitsopoulou, Christina & Polychronopoulou, Olga (2019). "The Archive and Atelier of the Gilliéron Artists: Three Generations, a Century (1870s–1980)". In Borgna, Elisabetta; Caloi, Ilaria; Carinci, Filippo & Laffineur, Robert (eds.). MHMH/MNEME: Past and Memory in the Aegean Bronze Age. Aegeum. Vol. 43. Leuven: Peeters. pp. 725–729. ISBN 978-90-429-3903-5.
- Richter, Gisela M. (1924). "Exhibitions of Casts of Greek Sculpture". Bulletin of the Metropolitan Museum of Art. 19 (7): 164–165. doi:10.2307/3254664. JSTOR 3254664.
- Shaw, Maria C. (2004). "The 'Priest-King' Fresco from Knossos: Man, Woman, Priest, King, or Someone Else?". In Chapin, Anne P. (ed.). ΧΑΡΙΣ: Essays in Honor of Sara A. Immerwahr. Hesperia Supplements. Vol. 33. Princeton: American School of Classical Studies at Athens. pp. 65–84. ISBN 978-0-87661-533-1. JSTOR 1354063.
- Stager, Jennifer M. S. (2022). Seeing Color in Classical Art: Theory, Practice, and Reception, from Antiquity to the Present. Cambridge University Press. doi:10.1017/9781009030212. ISBN 978-1-009-03021-2.
- Stamatopoulou, Maria (2016). "The Banquet Motif on the Funerary Stelai from Demetrias". In Draycott, Catherine M.; Stamatopoulou, Maria (eds.). Dining And Death: Interdisciplinary Perspectives on the 'Funerary Banquet' in Ancient Art, Burial, and Belief. Colloquia Antiqua 16. Leuven: Peeters. pp. 405–479. ISBN 9789042932517.
- Vlachopoulos, Andreas G. (2020). "The Ring of Nestor and the Quest for Authenticity". In Blakolmer, Fritz (ed.). Current Approaches and New Perspectives in Aegean Iconography. Presses universitaires de Louvain. pp. 223–252. ISBN 978-2-87558-968-2 – via Academia.edu.
- Waugh, Evelyn (1930). Labels. London: Duckworth. OCLC 458880564.
- Waugh, Evelyn (1946). When the Going Was Good. London: Duckworth. OCLC 170209.
