= Pythia =

Priestess of the Temple of Apollo at Delphi, Greece

Pythia (/ˈpɪθiə/; Ancient Greek: Πυθία [pyːˈtʰíaː]) was the title of the high priestess of the Temple of Apollo at Delphi in central Greece. She served as its oracle and was known as the Oracle of Delphi. Her title was sometimes historically glossed in English as the Pythoness.

The Pythia was established at the latest in the 8th century BC (though some estimates date the shrine to as early as 1400 BC), and was widely credited for her prophecies uttered under divine possession (enthusiasmos) by Apollo. The Pythian priestess emerged as pre-eminent by the end of the 7th century BC and continued to be consulted until the late 4th century AD, when the Christian emperor Theodosius I destroyed the Temple of Apollo. During this period, the Delphic Oracle was the most prestigious and authoritative oracle among the Greeks, and she was among the most powerful women of the classical world. The oracle is one of the best-documented religious institutions of the classical Greeks. Authors who mention the oracle include Aeschylus, Aristotle, Clement of Alexandria, Diodorus, Diogenes, Euripides, Herodotus, Julian, Justin, Livy, Lucan, Nepos, Ovid, Pausanias, Pindar, Plato, Plutarch, Sophocles, Strabo, Thucydides, and Xenophon.

Nevertheless, details of how the Pythia operated are scarce, missing, or non-existent, as authors from the classical period (6th to 4th centuries BC) treat the process as common knowledge with no need to explain. Those who discussed the oracle in any detail are from 1st century BC to 4th century AD and give conflicting stories. One of the main stories claimed that the Pythia delivered oracles in a frenzied or ecstatic state induced by vapours rising from an opening in the rock, and that she spoke gibberish. Priests interpreted her utterances as enigmatic prophecies and recomposed them into verse as dactylic hexameter, many of which are preserved in Greek literature. This idea, however, has been challenged by scholars such as Joseph Fontenrose and Lisa Maurizio, who argue that the ancient sources uniformly represent the Pythia speaking intelligibly, and giving prophecies in her own voice. Herodotus, writing in the fifth century BC, describes the Pythia speaking in dactylic hexameters.

== Name ==
The name Pythia is derived from "pythia hiereia" (Greek: πυθία ἱέρεια), meaning 'priestess of the Pythian Apollo'; it is related to Pythios (Πύθιος), an epithet of Apollo, itself deriving from Pytho, which in myth was the original name of Delphi. As such, the word is likely related to Python, the name of the mythical snake that was slain by Apollo near Delphi. Etymologically, the Greeks derived this place name from the verb πύθειν (púthein) 'to rot', which refers to the sickly sweet smell from the decomposing body of the monstrous Python after it was slain by Apollo.

== Origins ==
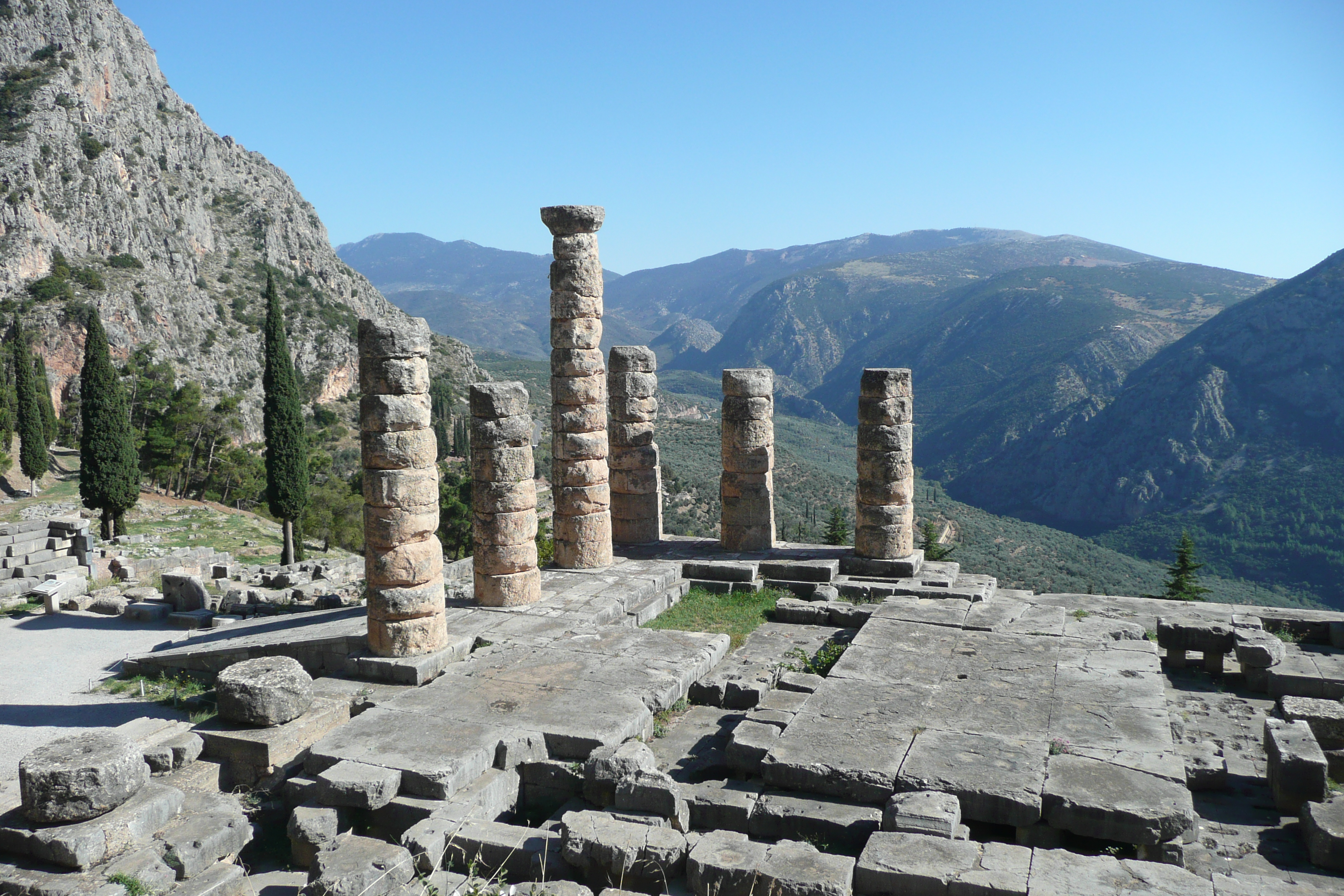
The Temple of Apollo at Delphi

The Delphic oracle may have been present in some form from 1400 BC, in the middle period of Mycenaean Greece (1750–1050 BC). There is evidence that Apollo supposedly took over the shrine with the arrival of priests from Delos in the 8th century, from an earlier dedication to Gaia. The 8th-century reformulation of the Oracle at Delphi as a shrine to Apollo seems associated with the rise in importance of the city of Corinth and the importance of sites in the Corinthian Gulf.

The earliest account of the origin of the Delphic oracle is provided in the Homeric Hymn to Delphic Apollo, which recent scholarship dates within a narrow range, c. 580–570 BC. It describes in detail how Apollo chose his first priests, whom he selected in their "swift ship"; they were "Cretans from Minos' city of Knossos" who were voyaging to sandy Pylos. But Apollo, who had Delphinios as one of his cult epithets, leapt into the ship in the form of a dolphin (delphys, gen. delphinos). Dolphin-Apollo revealed himself to the terrified Cretans and bade them follow him up to the "place where you will have rich offerings". The Cretans "danced in time and followed, singing Iē Paiēon, like the paeans of the Cretans in whose breasts the divine Muse has placed "honey-voiced singing". "Paean" seems to have been the name by which Apollo was known in Mycenaean times.

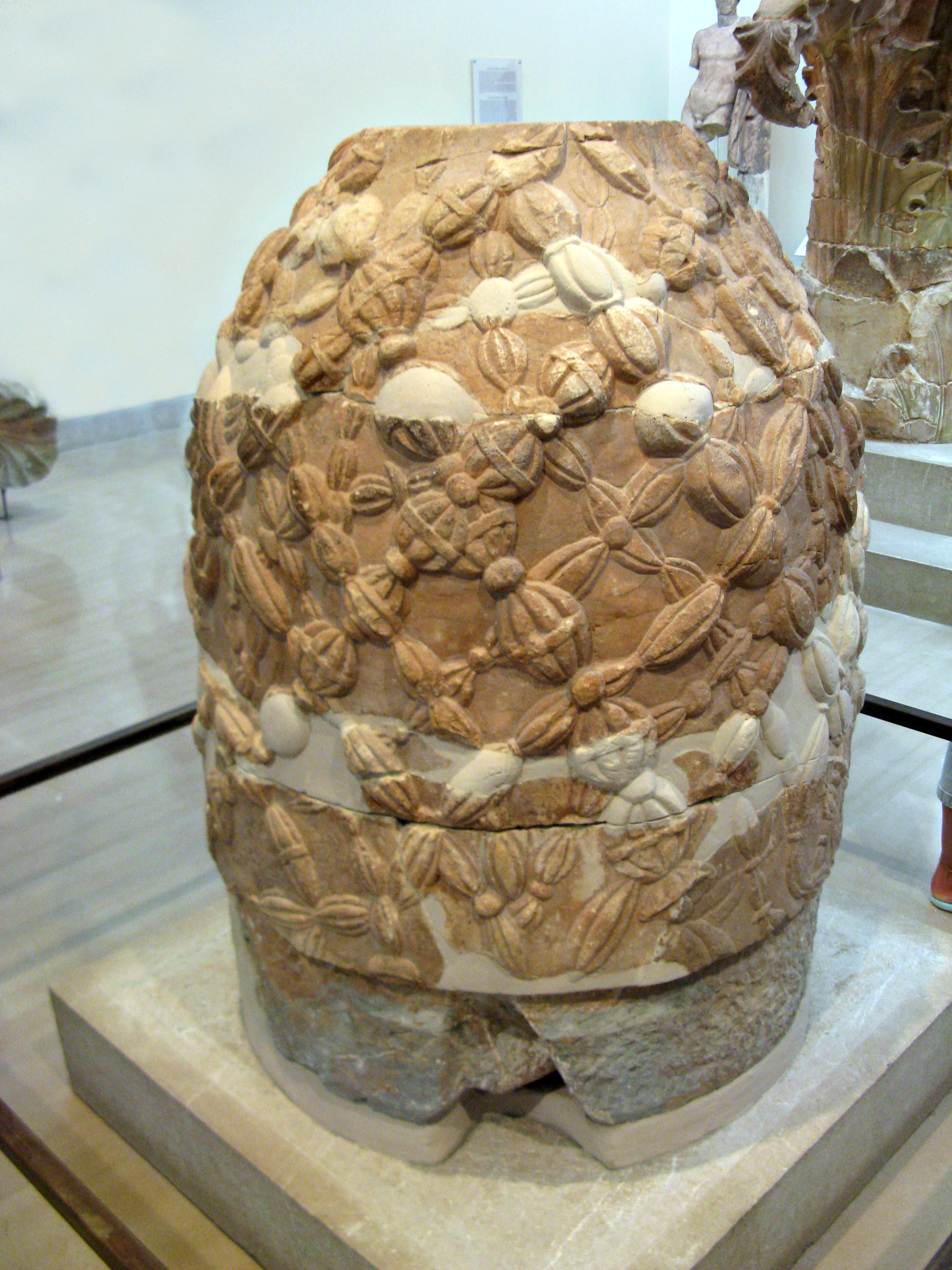
The omphalos in the museum of Delphi

G. L. Huxley observes: "If the hymn to (Delphic) Apollo conveys a historical message, it is above all that there were once Cretan priests at Delphi." Robin Lane Fox notes that Cretan bronzes are found at Delphi from the eighth century onwards, and Cretan sculptures are dedicated as late as c. 620–600 BC: "Dedications at the site cannot establish the identity of its priesthood, but for once we have an explicit text to set beside the archaeological evidence." An early visitor to these "dells of Parnassus", at the end of the eighth century, was Hesiod, who was shown the omphalos.

There are many later stories of the origins of the Delphic Oracle. One late explanation, which is first related by the 1st century BC writer Diodorus Siculus, tells of a goat herder named Coretas, who noticed one day that one of his goats, who fell into a crack in the earth, was behaving strangely. On entering the chasm, he found himself filled with a divine presence and the ability to see outside of the present, into the past and the future. Excited by his discovery, he shared it with nearby villagers. Many started visiting the site to experience the convulsions and inspirational trances, though some were said to disappear into the cleft due to their frenzied state. A shrine was erected at the site, where people began worshipping in the late Bronze Age, by 1600 BC. After the deaths of a number of men, the villagers chose a single young woman as the liaison for the divine inspirations. Eventually, she came to speak on behalf of the gods.

According to earlier myths, the office of the oracle was initially possessed by the goddesses Themis and Phoebe, and the site was initially sacred to Gaia. Subsequently, it was believed to be sacred to Poseidon, the god of earthquakes. During the Greek Dark Age, from the 11th to the 9th century BC, a new god of prophecy, Apollo, was said to have seized the temple and expelled the twin guardian serpents of Gaia, whose bodies he wrapped around the caduceus. Later myths stated that Phoebe or Themis had "given" the site to Apollo, rendering its seizure by priests of the new god justified, but presumably having to retain the priestesses of the original oracle because of the long tradition. It is possible that the myths portray Poseidon as mollified by the gift of a new site in Troizen.

Diodorus explained how, initially, the Pythia was an appropriately clad young virgin, for great emphasis was placed on the Oracle's chastity and purity to be reserved for union with the god Apollo. But he reports one story as follows:

Echecrates the Thessalian, having arrived at the shrine and beheld the virgin who uttered the oracle, became enamoured of her because of her beauty, carried her away and violated her; and that the Delphians because of this deplorable occurrence passed a law that in the future a virgin should no longer prophesy but that an elderly woman of fifty would declare the Oracles and that she would be dressed in the costume of a virgin, as a sort of reminder of the prophetess of olden times.

The scholar Martin Litchfield West writes that the Pythia shows many traits of shamanistic practices, likely inherited or influenced from Central Asian practices, although there is no evidence of any such association at this time. He cites the Pythia sitting in a cauldron on a tripod, while making her prophecies in an ecstatic trance state, like shamans, and her utterings unintelligible.

According to William Godwin, the tripod was perforated with holes, and as she inhaled the vapors, her figure would seem to enlarge, her hair stood on end, her complexion changed, her heart panted, her bosom swelled, and her voice became seemingly more than human.

== Organization of the Oracle ==
=== Priestess ===
The Oracle of Delphi Entranced by Heinrich Leutemann

Since the first operation of the oracle of the Temple of Delphi, it was believed that the god lived within a laurel, his holy plant, and gave oracles for the future with the rustling of the leaves. It was also said that the art of divination had been taught to the god by the three winged sisters of Parnassus, the Thriae, at the time when Apollo was grazing his cattle there. The Thriae used to have a Kliromanteion (an oracle by lot, or cleromancy) in that area in the past and it is possible that such was the first oracle of Delphi: throwing lots in a container, then pulling lots, the color and shape of which were of particular meaning and import.

Three oracles had successively operated in Delphi – the chthonion using egkoimisi (a procedure that involved sleeping in the holy place, so as to experience a revealing dream), the Kliromanteion and finally the Apollonian, with the laurel. But ever since the introduction of the cult of Dionysus at Delphi, the god that brought his followers into ecstasy and madness, the Delphic god gave oracles through Pythia, who also fell into a trance under the influence of vapors and fumes coming from the opening, the inner sanctum of the Oracle. Pythia sat on top of a tall gilded tripod that stood above the opening. In the old days, Pythia was a virgin, young girl, but after Echecrates of Thessaly kidnapped and violated a young and beautiful Pythia in the late 3rd century BC, a woman older than fifty years old was chosen, who dressed and wore jewelry to resemble a young maiden girl. According to tradition, Phemonoe was the first Pythia.

Though little is known of how the priestess was chosen, the Pythia was probably selected, at the death of her predecessor, from amongst a guild of priestesses of the temple. These women were all natives of Delphi and were required to have had a sober life and be of good character. Although some were married, upon assuming their role as the Pythia, the priestesses ceased all family responsibilities, marital relations, and individual identity. In the heyday of the oracle, the Pythia may have been a woman chosen from an influential family, well educated in geography, politics, history, philosophy, and the arts. During later periods, however, uneducated peasant women were chosen for the role, which may explain why the poetic pentameter or hexameter prophecies of the early period were later made only in prose. Often, the priestess's answers to questions would be put into hexameter by a priest. The archaeologist John Hale reports that:

the Pythia was (on occasion) a noble of aristocratic family, sometimes a peasant, sometimes rich, sometimes poor, sometimes old, sometimes young, sometimes a very lettered and educated woman to whom somebody like the high priest and the philosopher Plutarch would dedicate essays, other times who could not write her own name. So it seems to have been aptitude rather than any ascribed status that made these women eligible to be Pythias and speak for the god.

The job of a priestess, especially the Pythia, was a respectable career for Greek women. Priestesses enjoyed many liberties and rewards for their social position, such as freedom from taxation, the right to own property and attend public events, a salary and housing provided by the state, a wide range of duties depending on their affiliation, and often gold crowns.

During the main period of the oracle's popularity, as many as three women served as Pythia, another vestige of the triad, with two taking turns in giving prophecy and another kept in reserve. Only one day of the month could the priestess be consulted.

Plutarch said that the Pythia's life was shortened through the service of Apollo. The sessions were said to be exhausting. At the end of each period the Pythia would be like a runner after a race or a dancer after an ecstatic dance, which may have had a physical effect on the health of the Pythia.

=== Other officiants ===
Several other officiants served the oracle in addition to the Pythia. After 200 BC, at any given time, there were two priests of Apollo, who were in charge of the entire sanctuary; Plutarch, who served as a priest during the late first century and early second century AD, gives us the most information about the organization of the oracle at that time. Before 200 BC, while the temple was dedicated to Apollo, there was probably only one priest of Apollo. Priests were chosen from among the main citizens of Delphi, and were appointed for life. In addition to overseeing the oracle, priests would also conduct sacrifices at other festivals of Apollo, and had charge of the Pythian Games. Earlier arrangements, before the temple became dedicated to Apollo, are not documented.

The other officiants associated with the oracle are less well known. These are the hosioi (ὅσιοι, 'holy ones') and the prophētai (προφῆται, singular prophētēs). Prophētēs is the origin of the English word prophet, with the meaning 'one who forespeaks, one who foretells'. The prophetai are referred to in literary sources, but their function is unclear; it has been suggested that they interpreted the Pythia's prophecies, or even reformatted her utterances into verse, but it has also been argued that the term prophētēs is a generic reference to any cult officials of the sanctuary, including the Pythia. There were five hosioi, whose responsibilities are unknown, but may have been involved in some manner with the operation of the oracle.

=== Oracular procedure ===
In the traditions associated with Apollo, the oracle gave prophecies during the nine warmest months of each year. During winter months, Apollo was said to have deserted his temple, his place being taken by his divine half-brother Dionysus, whose tomb was also within the temple. It is not known whether the Oracle participated with the Dionysian rites of the Maenads or Thyades in the Korykion cave on Mount Parnassos, although Plutarch informs us that his friend Clea was both a Priestess to Apollo and to the secret rites of Dionysus. The male priests seem to have had their own ceremonies to the dying and resurrecting god. Apollo was said to return at the beginning of spring, on the seventh day of the month of Bysios, his birthday. This would reiterate the absences of the great goddess Demeter in winter also, which would have been a part of the earliest traditions.

Once a month, thereafter, the oracle would undergo purification rites, including fasting, to ceremonially prepare the Pythia for communications with the divine. On the seventh day of each month, she would be led by two attended oracular priests, with her face veiled in purple. A priest would then declaim:

Servant of the Delphian Apollo
Go to the Castallian Spring
Wash in its silvery eddies,
And return cleansed to the temple.
Guard your lips from offence
To those who ask for oracles.
Let the God's answer come
Pure from all private fault.

The Pythia would then bathe naked in the Castalian Spring, then drink the holier waters of the Cassotis, which flowed closer to the temple, where a naiad possessing magical powers was said to live. Euripides described this ritual purification ceremony, starting first with the priest Ion dancing on the highest point of Mount Parnassus, going about his duties within the temple, and sprinkling the temple floor with holy water. The purification ceremonies always were performed on the seventh day of the month, which was sacred to and associated with the god Apollo. Then, escorted by the hosioi, an aristocratic council of five, with a crowd of oracular servants, they would arrive at the temple. Consultants, carrying laurel branches sacred to Apollo, approached the temple along the winding upward course of the Sacred Way, bringing a young goat for sacrifice in the forecourt of the temple, and a monetary fee.

Inscribed on a column in the pronaos (forecourt) of the temple were an enigmatic "E" and three maxims:

1. Know thyself (γνῶθι σαυτόν) (gnōthi seauton)
2. Nothing to excess (μηδὲν ἄγαν) (mēden agan)
3. Surety brings ruin, or "make a pledge and mischief is nigh" (ἐγγύα πάρα δ'ἄτα) (engyā para d' ata)

These seem to have played an important part in the temple ritual. According to Plutarch's essay on the meaning of the "E at Delphi" (the only literary source for the E inscription), there have been various interpretations of this letter. In ancient times, the origin of these phrases was attributed to one or more of the Seven Sages of Greece.

Pythia would then remove her purple veil. She would wear a short plain white dress. At the temple fire to Hestia, a goat would be set in front of the altar and be sprinkled with water. If the goat shook off the water it was considered a good omen for the oracle, but if it did not, the enquirer was considered to have been rejected by the god and the consultation was terminated. If it were a good omen, however, the goat would subsequently be sacrificed to Apollo. In turn, the animal's organs, particularly its liver, were examined to ensure the signs were favorable, and then burned outside on the altar of Chios. The rising smoke was a signal that the oracle was open. The Oracle then descended into the adyton (Greek for 'inaccessible') and mounted her tripod seat, holding laurel leaves and a dish of Kassotis spring water into which she gazed. Nearby was the omphalos (Greek for 'navel'), which was flanked by two solid gold eagles representing the authority of Zeus, and the cleft from which emerged the sacred pneuma.

Petitioners drew lots to determine the order of admission, but representatives of a city-state or those who brought larger donations to Apollo were secured a higher place in line. Each person approaching the oracle was accompanied with a proxenos specific to the state of the petitioner, whose job was to identify the citizen of their polis. This service, too, was paid for.

Plutarch describes the events of one session in which the omens were ill-favored, but the Oracle was consulted nonetheless. The priests proceeded to receive the prophecy, but the result was a hysterical uncontrollable reaction from the priestess that resulted in her death a few days later.

At times when the Pythia was not available, consultants could obtain guidance by asking simple yes-or-no questions to the priests. A response was returned through the tossing of colored beans, one color designating "yes", another "no". Little else is known of this practice.

Between 535 and 615 of the Oracles (statements) of Delphi are known to have survived since classical times, of which over half are said to be accurate historically (see List of oracular statements from Delphi for examples).

Cicero noted no expedition was undertaken, no colony sent out, and no affair of any distinguished individuals went on without the sanction of the oracle.

The early fathers of the Christian church believed demons were allowed to assist them to spread idolatry so that the need for a savior would be more evident.

=== Experience of supplicants ===
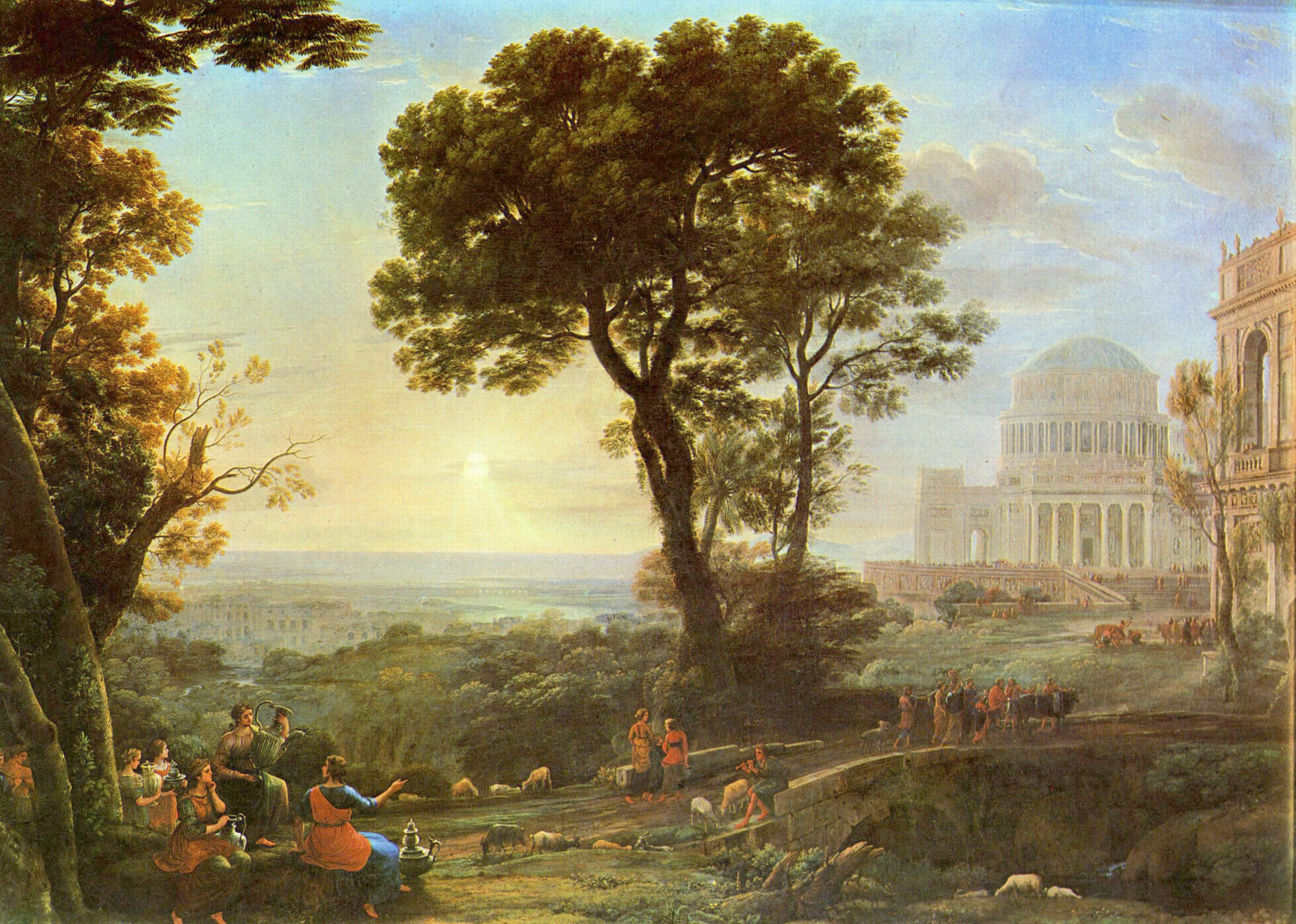
View of Delphi with Sacrificial Procession by Claude Lorrain

In antiquity, the people who went to the Oracle to ask for advice were known as "consultants", literally, "those who seek counsel". It would appear that the supplicant to the oracle would undergo a four-stage process, typical of shamanic journeys.

- Step 1: Journey to Delphi—Supplicants were motivated by some need to undertake the long and sometimes arduous journey to Delphi in order to consult the oracle. This journey was motivated by an awareness of the existence of the oracle, the growing motivation on the part of the individual or group to undertake the journey, and the gathering of information about the oracle as providing answers to important questions.
- Step 2: Preparation of the supplicant—Supplicants were interviewed in preparation of their presentation to the Oracle, by the priests in attendance. The genuine cases were sorted and the supplicant had to go through rituals involving the framing of their questions, the presentation of gifts to the Oracle and a procession along the Sacred Way carrying laurel leaves to visit the temple, symbolic of the journey they had made.
- Step 3: Visit to the Oracle—The supplicant would then be led into the temple to visit the adyton, put his question to the Pythia, receive his answer and depart. The degree of preparation already undergone would mean that the supplicant was already in a very aroused and meditative state, similar to the shamanic journey elaborated on in the article.
- Step 4: Return home—Oracles were meant to give advice to shape future action, which was meant to be implemented by the supplicant, or by those that had sponsored the supplicant to visit the Oracle. The validity of the Oracular utterance was confirmed by the consequences of the application of the oracle to the lives of those people who sought Oracular guidance.

== Temple of Apollo ==
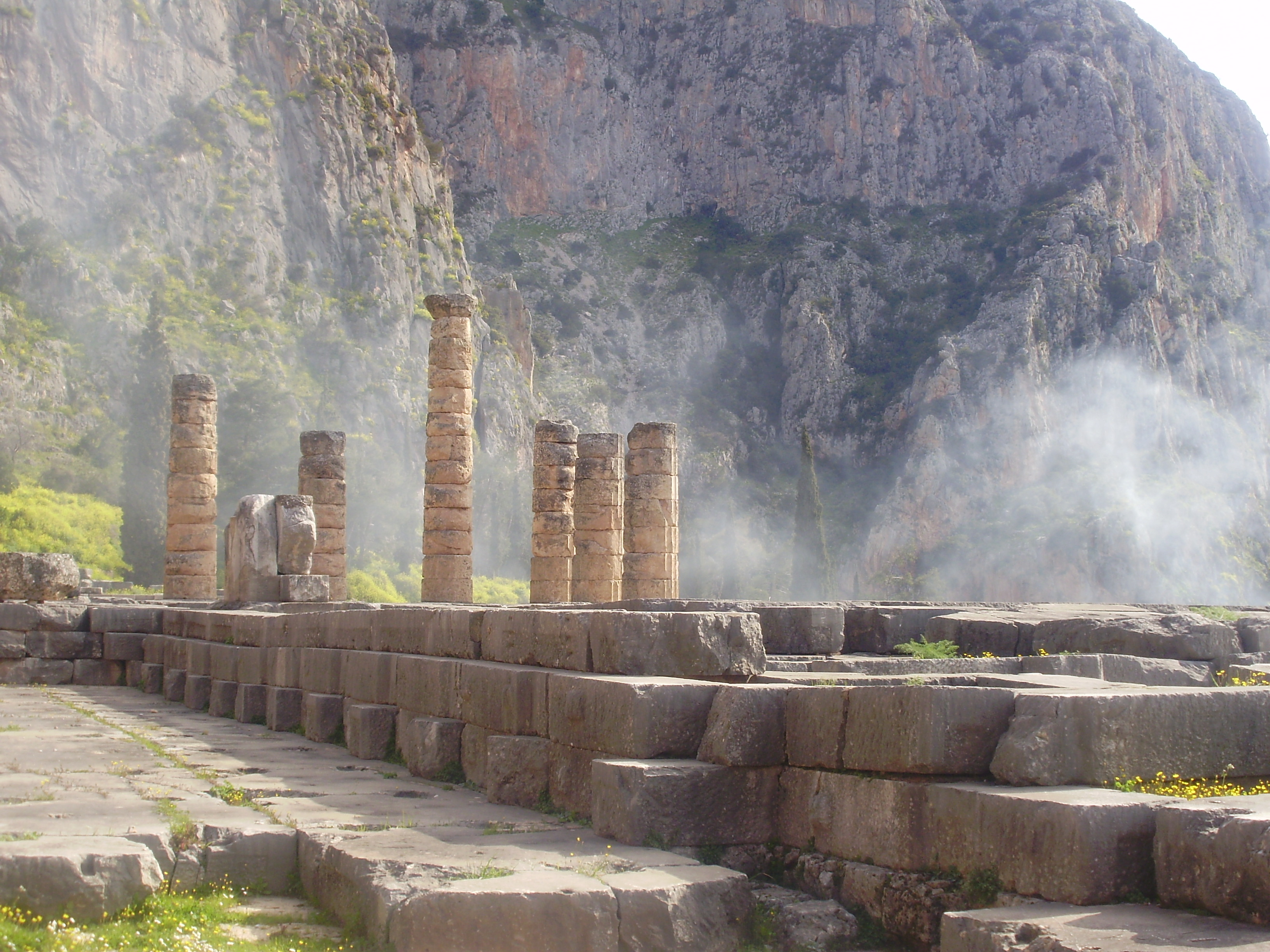
Modern photograph of the ruins of the Temple of Apollo at Delphi

The ruins of the Temple of Delphi visible today date from the 4th century BC, and are of a peripteral Doric building. It was erected on the remains of an earlier temple, dated to the 6th century BC, which itself was erected on the site of a 7th-century-BC construction attributed to the architects Trophonios and Agamedes.

The 6th-century BC temple was named the "Temple of Alcmaeonidae" in tribute to the Athenian family who funded its reconstruction following a fire, which had destroyed the original structure. The new building was a Doric hexastyle temple of 6 by 15 columns. This temple was destroyed in 373 BC by an earthquake. The pediment sculptures are a tribute to Praxias and Androsthenes of Athens. Of a similar proportion to the second temple it retained the 6 by 15 column pattern around the stylobate. Inside was the adyton, the centre of the Delphic oracle and seat of Pythia. The temple had the statement "Know thyself", one of the Delphic maxims, carved into it (and some modern Greek writers say the rest were carved into it), and the maxims were attributed to Apollo and given through the Oracle and/or the Seven Sages of Greece ("know thyself" perhaps also being attributed to other famous philosophers).

The temple survived until AD 390, when the Roman emperor Theodosius I silenced the oracle by destroying the temple and most statues and works of art to remove all traces of paganism.

== Scientific explanations ==
=== Fumes and vapors ===
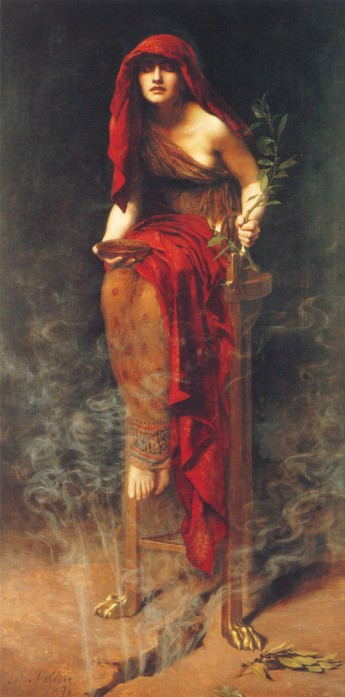
Priestess of Delphi (1891) by John Collier, showing the Pythia sitting on a tripod with vapor rising from a crack in the earth beneath her

There have been many attempts to find a scientific explanation for the Pythia's inspiration. Most commonly, these refer to an observation made by Plutarch, who presided as high priest at Delphi for several years, who stated that the oracular powers of the sibyl appeared to be associated with vapors from the Kerna spring waters that flowed under the temple. It has often been suggested that these vapors may have been hallucinogenic gases.

Recent geological investigations have suggested that gas emissions from a geologic chasm in the earth could have inspired the Delphic Oracle to "connect with the divine". Some researchers suggest the possibility that ethylene gas caused the Pythia's state of inspiration, based on the matching symptoms, ethylene's use as an anesthetic, and the smell of the chamber, as described by Plutarch. Traces of ethylene have been found in the waters of the Castallian spring, which is now largely diverted for the town water supply of the town of modern Delphi. However, Lehoux argues that ethylene is "impossible" and benzene is "crucially underdetermined". Others argue instead that methane might have been the gas emitted from the chasm, or CO_{2} and H_{2}S, arguing that the chasm itself might have been a seismic ground rupture.

Oleander, in contemporary toxicological literature, has also been considered responsible for contributing symptoms similar to those of the Pythia. The Pythia used oleander as a complement during the oracular procedure, chewing its leaves and inhaling their smoke. The toxic substances of oleander results in symptoms similar to those of epilepsy, the "sacred disease", which could have amounted to the possession of the Pythia by the spirit of Apollo, rendering Pythia his spokesperson and prophetess. The oleander fumes, the "spirit of Apollo,” could have originated in a brazier located in an underground chamber (the antron) and have escaped through an opening (the "chasm") in the temple's floor. This hypothesis fits the findings of the archaeological excavations that revealed an underground space under the temple. This explanation sheds light on the alleged spirit and chasm of Delphi, that have been the subject of intense debate and interdisciplinary research for the last hundred years.

Regardless of which fumes existed in the chasm, winter months would bring cooler weather, decreasing release of gases in the chamber. This offers a plausible explanation for the absence of summer deities in winter months. A toxic gas also explains the reason why the Pythia could only venture into her oracular chamber once a month, both to coincide with the correct concentration of gases, and to prolong the already-short lifespan of the Pythia by limiting her exposure to such fumes.

=== Excavations ===
Beginning during 1892, a team of French archaeologists directed by Théophile Homolle of the Collège de France excavated the site at Delphi. Contrary to ancient literature, they found no fissure and no possible means for the production of fumes.

Adolphe Paul Oppé published an influential article in 1904, which made three crucial claims: No chasm or vapor ever existed; no natural gas could create prophetic visions; and the recorded incidents of a priestess undergoing violent and often deadly reactions was inconsistent with the more customary reports. Oppé explained away all the ancient testimony as being reports of gullible travelers fooled by wily local guides who, Oppé believed, invented the details of a chasm and a vapor in the first place.

In accordance with this definitive statement, such scholars as Frederick Poulson, E. R. Dodds, Joseph Fontenrose, and Saul Levin all stated that there were no vapors and no chasm. For the decades to follow, scientists and scholars believed the ancient descriptions of a sacred, inspiring pneuma to be fallacious. During 1950, the French hellenist Pierre Amandry, who had worked at Delphi and later directed the French excavations there, concurred with Oppé's pronouncements, claiming that gaseous emissions were not even possible in a volcanic zone such as Delphi. Neither Oppé nor Amandry were geologists, though, and no geologists had been involved in the debate up to that point.

Subsequent re-examination of the French excavations, however, has shown that this consensus may have been mistaken. Broad (2007) demonstrates that a French photograph of the excavated interior of the temple clearly depicts a springlike pool as well as a number of small vertical fissures, indicating numerous pathways by which vapors could enter the base of the temple.

During the 1980s, the interdisciplinary team of geologist Jelle Zeilinga de Boer, archaeologist John R. Hale, forensic chemist Jeffrey P. Chanton, and toxicologist Henry R. Spiller investigated the site at Delphi using this photograph and other sources as evidence, as part of a United Nations survey of all active faults in Greece.

Jelle Zeilinga de Boer saw evidence of a fault line in Delphi that lay under the ruined temple. During several expeditions, they discovered two major fault lines, one lying north–south, the Kerna fault, and the other lying east–west, the Delphic fault, which parallels the shore of the Corinthian Gulf. The rift of the Gulf of Corinth is one of the most geologically active sites on Earth; shifts there impose immense strains on nearby fault lines, such as those below Delphi. The two faults cross one another, and they intersect right below where the adyton was probably located. (The actual, original oracle chamber had been destroyed by the moving faults, but there is strong structural evidence that indicates where it was most likely located.)

They also found evidence for underground passages and chambers, and drains for spring water. Additionally, they discovered at the site formations of travertine, a form of calcite created when water flows through limestone and dissolves calcium carbonate, which is later redeposited. Further investigation revealed that deep beneath the Delphi region lies a bituminous deposit, rich in hydrocarbons and full of pitch, that has a petrochemical content as high as 20%. Friction created by earthquakes heat the bituminous layers resulting in vaporization of the hydrocarbons which rise to the surface through small fissures in the rock.

=== Illusions in the adyton ===
It has been disputed as to how the adyton was organized, but it appears clear that this temple was unlike any other in ancient Greece. The small chamber was located below the main floor of the temple and offset to one side, perhaps constructed specifically over the crossing faults. The intimate chamber allowed the escaping vapors to be contained in quarters close enough to provoke intoxicating effects. Plutarch reports that the temple was filled with a sweet smell when the "deity" was present:

Not often nor regularly, but occasionally and fortuitously, the room in which they seat the god's consultants is filled with a fragrance and breeze, as if the adyton were sending forth the essences of the sweetest and most expensive perfumes from a spring

— Plutarch, Moralia 437c).

De Boer's research caused him to propose ethylene as a gas known to possess this sweet odor. Toxicologist Henry R. Spiller stated that inhalation of even a small amount of ethylene can cause both benign trances and euphoric psychedelic experiences. Other effects include physical detachment, loss of inhibitions, the relieving of pain, and rapidly changing moods without dulling consciousness. He also noted that excessive doses can cause confusion, agitation, delirium, and loss of muscle coordination.

Anesthesiologist Isabella Coler Herb found that a dose of ethylene gas up to 20% induced a trance in which subjects could sit up, hear questions and answer them logically, though with altered speech patterns, and they might lose some awareness and sensitivity in their hands and feet. After recovery, they had no recollection of what had happened. With a dose higher than 20%, the patients lost control over their limbs and might thrash wildly, groaning and staggering. All these hallucinogenic symptoms match Plutarch's description of the Pythia, whom he had witnessed many times.

During 2001, water samples from the Kerna spring, uphill from the temple and now diverted to the nearby town of Delphi, yielded evidence of 0.3 parts per million of ethylene. It is likely that in ancient times, higher concentrations of ethylene or other gases emerged in the temple from these springs. While likely in the context of the ethylene gas theory, there is no evidence to support the diminishing ethylene concentration statement.

Frequent earthquakes produced by Greece's location at the clashing intersection of three tectonic plates could have caused the observed cracking of the limestone, and the opening of new channels for hydrocarbons entering the flowing waters of the Kassotis. This would cause the admixture of ethylene to fluctuate, increasing and decreasing the potency of the drug. It has been suggested that the waning of the Oracle after the era of Roman Emperor Hadrian was due in part to a long period without earthquakes in the area.

== See also ==
- The Apollonian and Dionysian, concept of human dichotomy
- Cumaean Sibyl
- The Delphian Club, named for the Oracle of Delphi
- Delphic maxims
- Delphic sibyl
- Erythraean Sibyl
- Hiereiai
- List of oracular statements from Delphi
- Sibyl
- Theia mania, Pythia's divine inspiration in Plato's c. 370 BC dialogue Phaedrus
- Xenoclea

== General and cited references ==
=== Ancient sources ===
- Herodotus, The Histories, at the Perseus Project
- Homeric Hymn to Apollo, at the Perseus Project
- Pausanias, Description of Greece, (ed. and translated with commentary by Sir James Frazer), 1913 edition. Cf. v.5
- Plutarch, De defectu oraculorum ("On the Decline of Oracles"), De Pythiae Oraculis ("On the Oracles of the Pythia"), and De E apud Delphos ("On the E at Delphi") in Moralia, vol. 5 (Loeb Library, Harvard University Press)

=== Modern sources ===
- Bouché-Leclercq, Auguste (1879–1882). Histoire de la divination dans l'Antiquité. Paris: Ernest Leroux. Volume I-IV.
- Bowden, Hugh (2005). Classical Athens and the Delphic Oracle: Divination and Democracy. Cambridge: Cambridge University Press. ISBN 978-0-521-53081-1.
- Broad, William J. (2007). The Oracle: Ancient Delphi and the Science Behind Its Lost Secrets. New York: Penguin Press. ISBN 978-0-14-303859-7.
- Burkert, Walter (1985). Greek Religion: Archaic and Classical. Cambridge: Harvard University Press. ISBN 0-674-36280 2. Orig. in German (1977).
- Connelly, Joan Breton (2007). Portrait of a Priestess: Women and Ritual in Ancient Greece. New Jersey: Princeton University Press. ISBN 978-0-691-12746-0.
- Courby, Fernand (1927). Feuilles de Delphi: Tome 2, Topographie et Architecture, La Terrace du Temple. Paris: E. de Boccard.
- de Boer, Jelle Zeilinga; Hale, John Rigby; Chaton, Jeffrey P. (2001). "New Evidence for the Geological Origins of the Ancient Delphic Oracle". Geology. 29 (8): 707–711. doi:10.1130/0091-7613(2001)029<0707:NEFTGO>2.0.CO;2.
- Dempsey, T. (1918). The Delphic oracle, its early history, influence and fall. Oxford: B.H. Blackwell.
- Dodds, E. R. (1963). The Greeks and the Irrational. Berkeley: University of California Press.
- Etiope, G., D. Christodoulou, M. Geraga, P. Favali, & G. Papatheodorou, "The geological links of the ancient Delphic Oracle (Greece): a reappraisal of natural gas occurrence and origin", Geology, 34, 821–824 (2006)
- Farnell, Lewis Richard (1896–1909). The Cults of the Greek States. Oxford: Clarendon Press. Cf. especially, volume IV on the Pythoness and Delphi.
- Fontenrose, Joseph Eddy (1980) [1959]. Python: a study of Delphic myth and its origins. Berkeley: University of California Press. ISBN 0-520-04091-0.
- Fontenrose, Joseph Eddy (1978). The Delphic oracle, its responses and operations, with a catalogue of responses. Berkeley: University of California Press. ISBN 0-520-03360-4.
- Foster, J.; Lehoux, D. (2007). "The Delphic Oracle and the ethylene-intoxication hypothesis". Clinical Toxicology. 45 (1): 85-89. doi:10.1080/15563650601120800.
- Golding, William, The Double Tongue, London, Faber (1995). Posthumous, fictional novel by the Nobel prize winner about a Pythia in the 1st century BCE.
- Goodrich, Norma Lorre, Priestesses, New York : F. Watts, ISBN 0-531-15113-1 (1989); Harper Collins, Perennial, ISBN 0-06-097316-1 (1990)
- Guthrie, William Keith Chambers, The Greeks and Their Gods (1950)
- Hale, John R.; de Boer, Jelle Zeilinga; Chanton, Jeffrey P.; Spiller, Henry A. (2003). "Questioning the Delphic Oracle". Scientific American. 289 (2).
- Hall, Manly Palmer, The Secret Teachings of All Ages, cf. Chapter 14, (1928)
- Harissis, Haralampos V. (2014). "A Bittersweet Story: The True Nature of the Laurel of the Oracle of Delphi". Perspectives in Biology and Medicine. 57 (3): 351-360. doi:10.1353/pbm.2014.0032.
- Holland, Leicester B., "The Mantic Mechanism at Delphi", American Journal of Archaeology 37 pp. 201–214 (1933)
- Lehoux, Daryn (2007). "Drugs and the Delphic Oracle". Classical World. 101 (1): 41-56.
- Maass, E., De Sibyllarum Indicibus, Berlin (1879)
- Maurizio, Lisa (2001a). "The Voice at the Centre of the World: The Pythia's Ambiguity and Authority". In Lardinois, Andre; McClure, Laura (eds.). Making Silence Speak: Women's Voices in Greek Literature and Society. New Jersey: Princeton University Press. pp. 46–50.
- Mikalson, Jon D. (2022). Ancient Greek Religion (3rd ed.). Hoboken: Wiley-Blackwell. ISBN 978-1-119-56562-8.
- Miller, Water, Daedalus and Thespis Vol 1, (1929)
- Mitford, William, The History of Greece (1784); cf. v.1, Chapter III, Section 2, p. 177, "Origin and Progress of the Oracles"
- Morgan, Catherine. Athletes and Oracles, Cambridge (1990)
- Nilsson, Martin P. (1972). Cults, Myths, Oracles, and Politics in Ancient Greece. With Two Appendices: The Ionian Phylae, the Phratries. New York: Cooper Square Publishers.
- Parke, Herbert William (1939). A History of the Delphic Oracle. Oxford: Basil Blackwell. ASIN B002NZWT0Y.
- Parke, Herbert William (1992) [1988]. Sibyls and Sibylline Prophecy in Classical Antiquity. London: Routledge. ISBN 978-0-415-07638-8.
- Piccardi, Luigi, "Active faulting at Delphi: seismotectonic remarks and a hypothesis for the geological environment of a myth", Geology, 28, 651–654 (2000)
- Piccardi L., C. Monti, F. Tassi O. Vaselli, D. Papanastassiou & K. Gaki-Papanastassiou, "Scent of a myth: tectonics, geochemistry and geomythology at Delphi (Greece)", Journal of the Geological Society, London, 165, 5–18 (2008)
- Potter, David Stone (1990). Prophecy and history in the crisis of the Roman Empire: a Historical Commentary on the Thirteenth Sibylline Oracle. Oxford: Clarendon Press. Cf. Chapter 3
- Poulson, Frederick. Dephi Gleydenhall, London (1920)
- Rohde, Erwin, Psyche: The Cult of Souls and the Belief in Immortality among the Greeks, trans. from the 8th edn. by W. B. Hillis, Routledge & Kegan Paul, London, (1925); reprinted by Routledge (2000); full text in English
- Spiller, Henry A.; Hale, John R.; De Boer, Jelle Z. (2002). "The Delphic Oracle: A Multidisciplinary Defense of the Gaseous Vent Theory". Clinical Toxicology. 40 (2): 189-196. doi:10.1081/CLT-120004410.
- West, Martin Litchfield (1983). The Orphic Poems. Oxford: Clarendon Press. ISBN 0-19-814854-2.
