= Ring of Nestor =

Gold ring, reportedly Minoan, of disputed origin

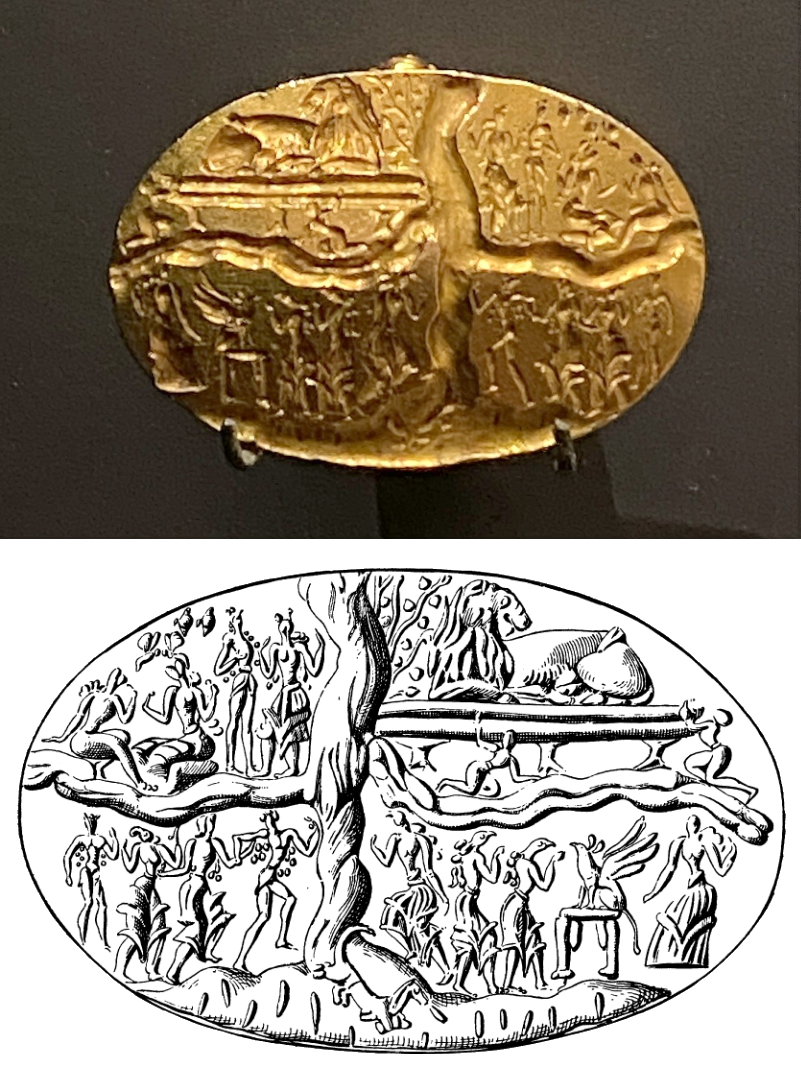
- Top: Photograph of the ring in the Ashmolean Museum; Bottom: Drawing of the impression of the ring's bezel
- Material: Gold
- Size: Bezel: 3.29 cm × 2.18 cm (1.295 in × 0.858 in); Hoop inner diameter: 1.4 to 1.56 cm (0.551 to 0.614 in); Hoop band: 0.82 cm × 0.35 cm (0.32 in × 0.14 in)
- Weight: 31.76 g (1.12 oz)
- Discovered: Before 1907; Kakovatos, Messenia, Greece (reported)
- Present location: Ashmolean Museum
- Identification: AN1938.1130; CMS VI.229
- Period: Late Minoan I (c. 1700 – c. 1450 BCE) (claimed); 20th century CE (claimed)
- Culture: Minoan (disputed)

The Ring of Nestor (Note: The name "Ring of Nestor" was invented by Arthur Evans in the 1920s. It is sometimes referred to as CMS VI.229, after its number in the Corpus der minoischen und mykenischen Siegel (CMS).) is a gold signet ring first described by the archaeologist Arthur Evans in 1925. According to Evans, it was made on Minoan Crete in the Late Bronze Age and discovered in a Mycenaean tholos tomb near the ancient site of Pylos in Messenia, in southwest Greece. The ring has a crowded and complex design, including human figures as well as real and mythical animals, and has been interpreted as indicating aspects of Minoan religion. Evans considered it to show scenes from the underworld, and to illustrate connections between Minoan belief and ancient Egyptian religion. It is currently held by the Ashmolean Museum at the University of Oxford, to which Evans gifted it in 1939.

Since its discovery, the ring's authenticity has been debated, with several scholars considering it a modern fake, and others defending it as a genuinely ancient artefact. Arguments in both directions have been made on the grounds of iconographical consistency with other Minoan artworks, and based upon the potential role of Émile Gilliéron fils, an art restorer, suspected forger, and prolific collaborator of Evans's, in the ring's discovery. Other arguments for authenticity include the wear evident upon the ring and microscopic analysis of its engraving technique, while circumstantial evidence against it has been adduced from Evans's convoluted story of its origins and the fortuitous connections between its iconography and Evans's own ideas about the links between Minoan and Egyptian religion. The ring was removed from display at the Ashmolean in the 20th century, but returned to public view in 1995.

== Description ==
The authenticity of the Ring of Nestor is disputed. Scholars who consider the ring to be ancient date it to the Late Minoan I period (c. 1700 – c. 1450 BCE), during the Neopalatial period of Minoan civilization. The ring is made of gold of 97% purity, with the remaining 3% being copper, and weighs 31.76 grams (1.12 oz). It has a hollow bezel, made of a gold sheet 0.25 mm (0.01 in) in thickness, with a groove for a finger set into the underside. The ring's hoop is decorated with a central band of embossed hemispherical pieces, which are soldered onto the hoop, and with granules of two different sizes. The hemispheres and granules have been deformed, with the most damage apparent on the central band of large hemispheres.

The hoop is slightly elliptical, with internal diameters of 1.4 and 1.56 cm (0.551 and 0.614 in), a width of 0.82 cm (0.32 in), and a thickness of 0.35 cm (0.14 in). The bezel is 3.29 cm (1.295 in) horizontally and 2.18 cm (0.858 in) vertically. Owing to the narrow diameter of the hoop, Arthur Evans (who first introduced the ring to scholarship) considered that it was probably intended to be hung on a string rather than worn on the finger.

The iconography on the ring's bezel is divided into four scenes, each occupying a quarter of the face. The scenes are separated by a thicker vertical band and a thinner horizontal band; the vertical band rises out of a base. At the intersection of the vertical band and the base is an animal form, whose identification has been debated. The bands are generally taken to represent the trunk and branches of a large tree. The bands were probably made with a punch, while the figures are likely to have been both punched and engraved.

Of the 99 known signet rings from the Aegean Bronze Age, the Ring of Nestor shows the greatest number of individual figures: it depicts fourteen human figures and at least five other animals. In the scene in the upper-left quadrant, a lion can be seen lying on a large structure, called a "table" by Helen Hughes-Brock and John Boardman, beneath which are two naked human women, each with one hand on the table. Four small branches, resembling ivy, sprout from the vertical dividing-band to the image's right. Below this scene, several women in long, layered skirts can be seen: one walks towards the central band, while two approach a small table on which a griffin is seated. The women may have the heads of birds, or alternatively simply have their heads leant forwards. Behind the griffin, a female figure stands in a skirt slightly longer than those of the others, facing the ring's centre. Hughes-Brock and Boardman describe these two scenes as "otherworldly", in contrast to the scenes on the ring's right, which only contain human figures and insects.

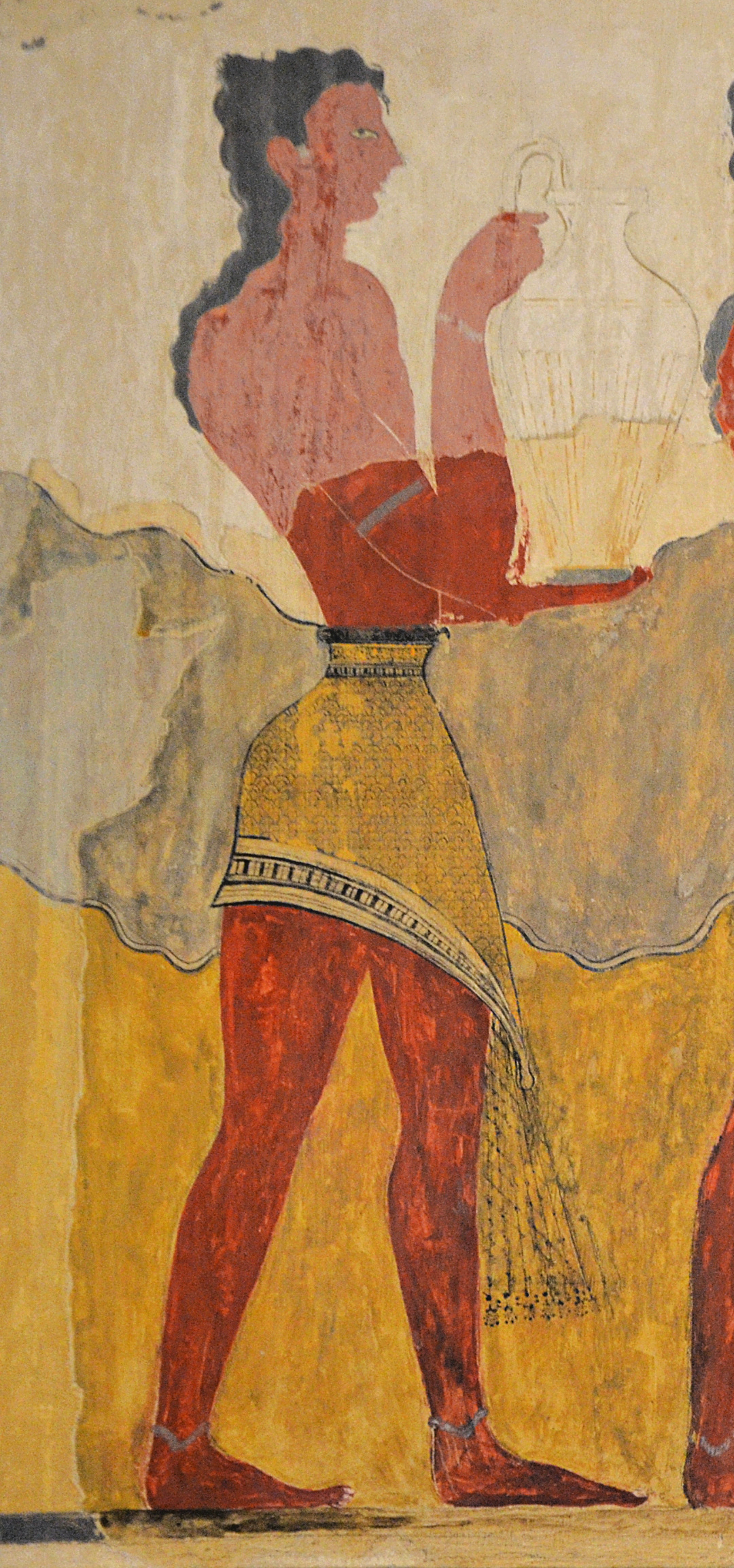
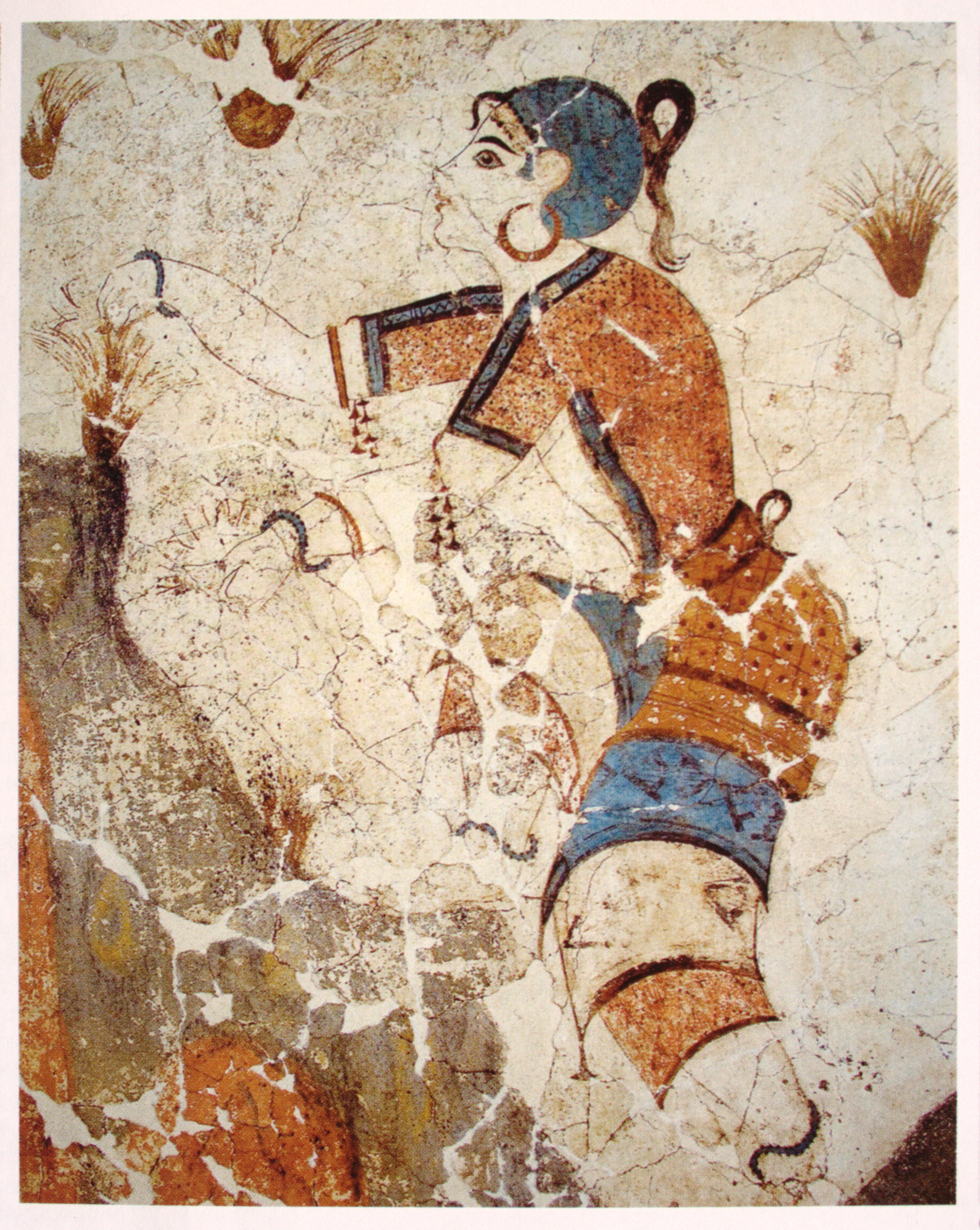
Minoan frescoes showing examples of clothing similar to that depicted on the Ring of Nestor

On the right-hand side of the bezel, the upper image shows a pair of women, one sitting and one squatting, facing each other: one may be wearing a skirt, or both may be naked. Next to them are a man and a woman, standing; the man wears a belted kilt and the woman a knee-length layered skirt. Above the human figures can be seen two winged insects and two ovoid shapes identified by Hughes-Brock and Boardman as pupae. Below this scene is one of four human figures walking towards the centre of the ring: the first and last figures are men, and the two in the middle are women in long, flounced skirts.

=== Interpretation ===
Evans considered the ring to depict scenes from the Minoan underworld, specifically "the admission of the departed into the realms of bliss". He interpreted the shape dividing the four quarters of the ring as "unquestionably a tree, old and gnarled", which he considered to be comparable with the world tree called Yggdrasil in Norse mythology. He considered the lion to be "the guardian of the Lower World", and the creature at the base, which he took to be a dog, to be "the Minoan forerunner of Cerberus" – the three-headed dog who guards the underworld in classical Greek mythology. The griffin on the bezel is a common motif in Minoan art, originally taken from the Near East. (Note: Galanakis 2013, p. 159. On the origins of the griffin motif, see Caubet 2002, p. 229.)

Evans wrote in a letter, shortly after seeing the ring, that it depicted "a map of the Elysian Fields" according to the Minoans. He interpreted the winged insects as butterflies, and as symbols of the reincarnation of the human beings next to them. In the same scene, he saw the standing female figure as a goddess, and the male figure as a young man reunited with his lover, either after death or possibly upon entering the underworld while alive. He considered this goddess to be a deity of the underworld, the lion (following parallels in Egyptian iconography) to be associated with her, and the two women in the same scene to be her handmaidens. (Note: Evans 1930, pp. 153–154; Evans 1925, pp. 65–68 (on the lion's Egyptian connection).) He described the scene with the griffin as that of souls being tested on entry to "the Halls of the Just in the Griffin's Court", and the griffin itself as a "Chief Inquisitor". Evans characterised the whole scene as "the abode of light rather than of darkness", equivalent to the paradise of Elysium in later Greek mythology. Nanno Marinatos and Briana Jackson suggest that Evans's interpretation of the scene via Egyptian mythology, as well as his reading of the central motif as a tree, was influenced by James Frazer's The Golden Bough, as well as by the discovery of the Tomb of Tutankhamun in 1923.

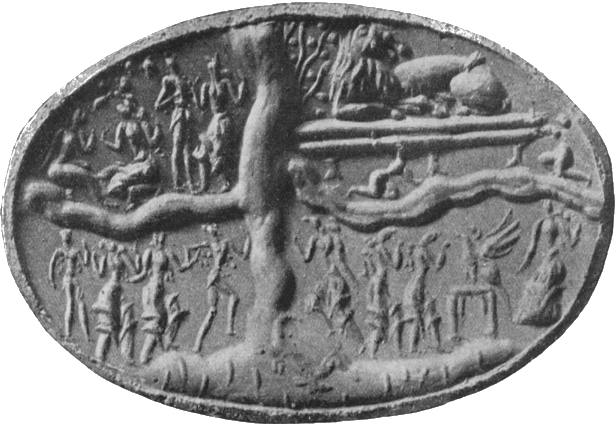
Photograph of a cast of the ring's impression, published by Evans in 1925

Martin P. Nilsson discussed the ring in a 1927 work on Minoan and Mycenaean religion, in which he called it "a most amazing find ... [which] differs most markedly from other Mycenaean rings". (Note: Nilsson 1927, p. 549. Nilsson's treatment of the ring is discussed by Marinatos..) (Note: In the early twentieth century, the term "Mycenaean" could be applied to the civilisation of Crete: see Karadimas & Momigliano 2004, p. 252.) Nilsson disagreed with Evans's association between the tree motif and the world tree, pointing out that the motif was not known to be attested prior to the eighth century CE; he considered the tree more likely to prefigure the tree in the Garden of the Hesperides in Greek mythology, which grew golden apples. In support of this, he suggested that the creature labelled by Evans as a proto-Cerberus should be considered a forerunner of Ladon, the dragon who guarded that tree. He considered there to be no compelling reason to suggest that the scenes on the ring were related to the afterlife or the underworld. Galanakis identifies the figure as a dragon, and considers it to be inspired by similar Babylonian motifs otherwise rare in Minoan art; (Note: Galanakis 2013, p. 159. On the origins of the griffin motif, see Caubet 2002, p. 229.) Hughes-Brock and Boardman call it a "Minoan dragon". Andreas Vlachopoulos identifies it as a scorpion.

Jean-Claude Poursat, in 1976, suggested that the vertical and horizontal bands represented rivers, a hypothesis initially entertained but dismissed by Evans. In support of this, Poursat argued that the creature at the base was a "fantastical crocodile" or "crocodile-dragon". He further suggested that the lower half of the bezel, assumed to be a single episode by Evans, may have been intended to show two successive scenes. Olga Krzyszkowska described Evans's interpretation of the bezel as an underworld scene as "fanciful" in 2005.

== History ==
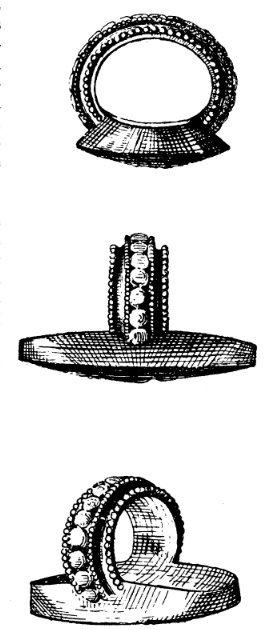
Line drawing of the ring from the side, published by Evans in 1925

In 1907, a series of tholos tombs at Kakovatos in Messenia, in the southwest Peloponnese region of Greece, were excavated by the German archaeologist Wilhelm Dörpfeld. According to Evans, the ring was taken by a local peasant from one of these tombs (along with blocks of masonry) prior to the excavation, probably from the grave-pit inside the tomb's chamber. (Note: Evans considered the ring to have come from "Tomb A" at Kakovatos.)

In 1924, or possibly earlier, the ring was shown to the acquisitions committee of the National Archaeological Museum in Athens, of which the German archaeologist Georg Karo was a member. Following Karo's judgement, the committee rejected the ring as a forgery, created by a modern goldsmith in the early twentieth century. Evans was subsequently informed of the ring's existence by somebody he described as "a trustworthy source" (and later "a friend"): Karo inferred that Evans was referring to Émile Gilliéron fils, an art restorer, suspected forger, and prolific collaborator of Evans's. (Note: Marinatos 2015, pp. 194–195. On Gilliéron's potential illicit activities, see Lapatin 2002, pp. 144–150, 171; and Gere 2009, p. 128.) Nanno Marinatos endorsed this view in 2015, and Vlachopoulos called it "very possible" in 2020.

Evans subsequently travelled to the Peloponnese to view the ring, where he was told that the finder had died, leaving the ring to his son; the son passed it into the possession of the owner of a nearby vineyard. Evans purchased the ring from the vineyard owner between 1924 and 1925, and named it the "Ring of Nestor" after the mythological king of the region of Messenia in the Homeric poems. He gifted the ring to the Ashmolean Museum at the University of Oxford in 1939. It was subsequently removed from display, though placed back there in 1995. As of 2018, it remains in the Ashmolean.

== Debate over authenticity ==
The authenticity of the Ring of Nestor has been debated since its introduction to scholarship. In 2019, Angelika Hudler categorised the ring among gemmae dubitandae ('jewels deserving scepticism'). (Note: According to Hudler, the term "attempts to include artifacts of unknown provenance and date of production into the scientific discussion while at the same time stressing the doubtful character of their alleged Aegean Bronze Age origin".) In 2013, Yannis Galanakis called the ring "one of the most controversial Aegean objects in the Ashmolean's collection".

=== Arguments against authenticity ===
Before the 1970s, most scholars considered the ring a forgery. Nilsson, who treated the ring as genuine in 1927, revised the 1950 edition of his work to call it a "suspect object". According to Nanno Marinatos, her father Spyridon Marinatos considered the Ring of Nestor a fake. She cites as evidence a reference in a 1928 letter by Marinatos to "reprimands" Evans was receiving about forgeries. Hagen Biesantz argued in 1954 that the ring's iconography was inconsistent with the known corpus of Minoan art, and accordingly that the ring was a forgery. (Note: Cited in Hudler 2019, p. 6.)

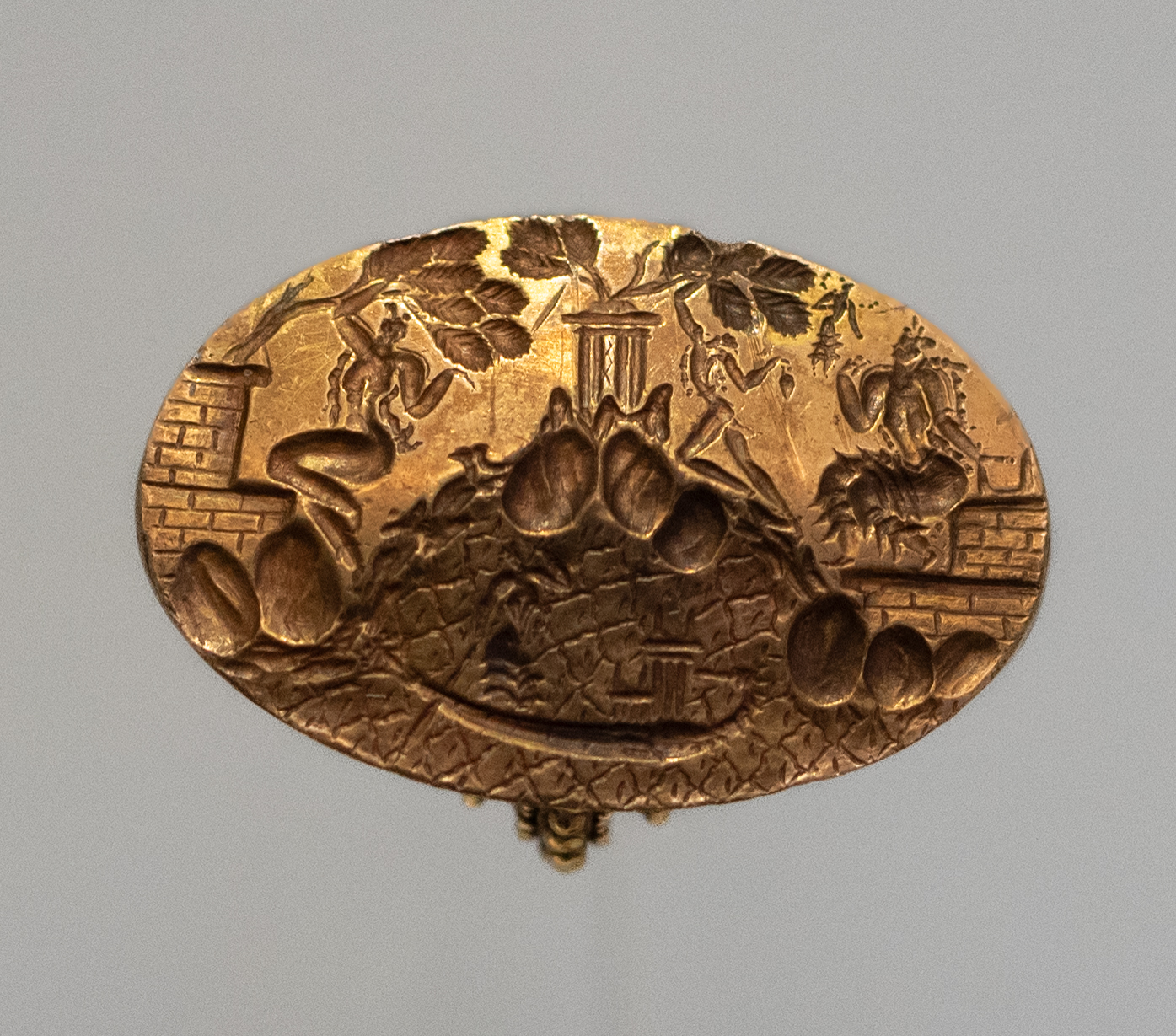
The Ring of Minos

Evans published the ring alongside the "Thisbe Treasure" from Boeotia, considered a modern forgery, and the connection has cast doubt upon the Ring of Nestor in turn. John Younger, in 1975, suggested that the ring had been forged by Gilliéron fils and his father, who had also been accused of forging the Ring of Minos apparently found at Knossos and also published by Evans. (Note: Pini 1998, p. 1. On the authenticity of the Ring of Minos, see Krzyszkowska 2005, pp. 334–335.) In 1986, the Swedish archaeologist Robin Hägg separately reported hearing from a collaborator of Axel W. Persson, who had worked on the Aegean Bronze Age in the 1930s, that Persson had told her that Gilliéron fils had forged the Ring of Nestor: Hägg subsequently heard the same story from the Egyptologist Torgny Säve-Söderbergh and from Doro Levi, director of the Italian School of Archaeology at Athens from 1947 until 1976. (Note: Marinatos & Jackson 2011, p. 11. For Levi's dates as director, see "Direttori" (in Italian). Italian School of Archaeology at Athens.) Agnes Sakellariou upheld the Gilliéron hypothesis in 1994, arguing that the insects labelled as butterflies by Evans had no direct parallels in Minoan art, but could have been based by a forger on Mycenaean examples found in tombs on the Greek mainland. Krzyszkowska similarly accused the Gilliérons of forging the ring in 2005.

Nanno Marinatos and Briana Jackson wrote in 2011 that the "complicated chain of transmission" reported to Evans raised suspicion, and made it impossible to verify the truth of the ring's discovery. They also argued that butterflies had no connection to the soul or reincarnation in Minoan culture, but that they were included on the ring because they held this metaphorical function in Victorian thought, and had been incorrectly linked to the concept in Mycenaean culture by Heinrich Schliemann and more widely in Frazer's work. Marinatos and Jackson suggested that the connections between the ring's design and Egyptian iconography were based directly on The Golden Bough, which emphasised the religious role of oak trees and mistletoe, and calculated to appeal to Evans, who had long sought to establish a relationship between Minoan religion and that of ancient Egypt.

=== Arguments in favour of authenticity ===
V. Gordon Childe wrote in 1925 that "fortunately no such suspicions [of forgery] attach to the unique gold ring", and that it was "undoubtedly a remnant of the regal wealth once buried in the great tombs of Kakovatos". (Note: Joseph Alexander MacGillivray suggests that Childe's enthusiasm for the ring came "because he was himself busily myth-making in his own right" with regard to the origins of the Indo-Europeans.) Yiannis Sakellarakis, in 1973, considered the iconography of the ring to match other known Minoan examples, and so that the ring was likely to be genuine. (Note: Sakellarakis 1973, cited in Marinatos 2015, p. 194, n. 27.) Jean-Claude Poursat accepted these arguments in his own publication of 1976.

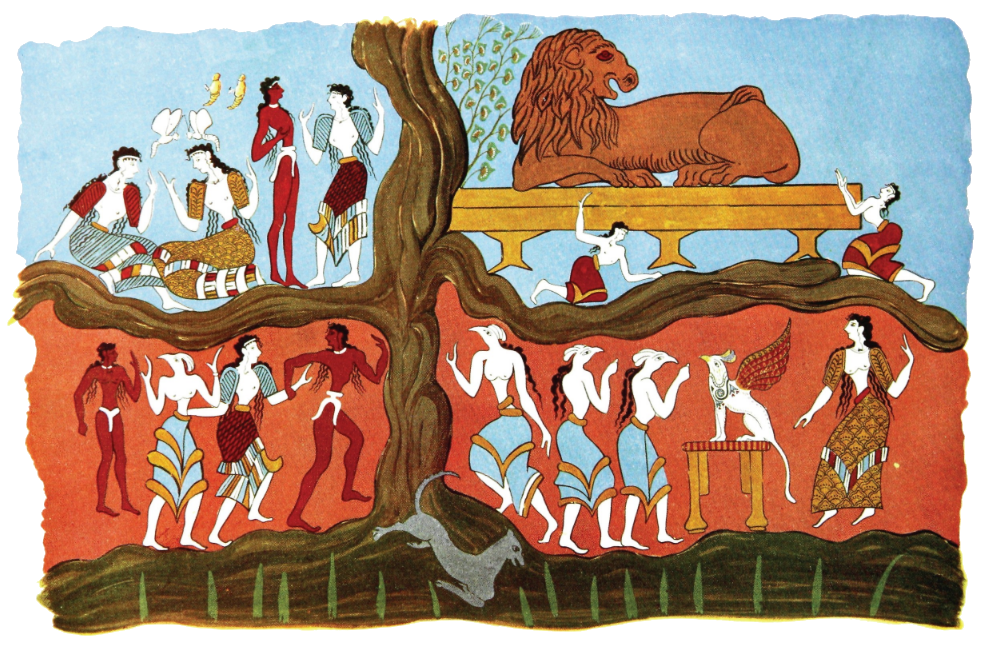
Gilliéron's rendering of the ring's impression in the style of a Minoan fresco, published by Evans in 1930

Vlachopoulos suggests that Gilliéron could not have been involved in faking the ring, because his drawing of the bezel for Evans's publications showed a hound for the creature Vlachopoulos identified as a scorpion, demonstrating "his ignorance and his innocence". Ingo Pini similarly argued that the different treatment of the creature on the ring and Gilliéron's later painting of the same scene, in which Pini described the rendering as "a rather odd-looking quadruped", indicates that Gilliéron could not have made both.

Similarly, Theodore Eliopoulos suggested that the "table" on which the lion reclines as a horizontal platform supported by three incurved altars: such a platform was unknown in Minoan iconography at the time of the ring's discovery, but later found in the 1970s and 1980s on frescoes from Akrotiri. Eliopoulos considers this evidence for a genuine Bronze Age origin. Similarly, he argues that the appearance of lions as supporters of goddesses, known from Akrotiri frescoes as well as rings and sealings discovered after 1925, suggest the authenticity of the ring, as the lion's presence was considered anomalous when the ring was first published. Pini argued against Sakellariou's interpretation of the butterflies as without precedent, suggesting that they echoed sealings found at the Cretan site of Hagia Triada, excavated in 1902–1903 but not published until 1925. He also drew a parallel between the creature at the base of the tree, which he called a "Minoan dragon", and a form on a seal found at Mycenae in the 1990s, while arguing that the motif would not have been known to a forger in the early twentieth century.

In 1998, Jack Ogden studied the manufacturing technique of the ring, and concluded that it matched that of genuine examples, whereby the bezel was carved first, the hoop added, and the back plate of the bezel then soldered into place. In addition, he considered that microscopic analysis of the engraving showed that it had been done according to Mycenaean techniques, which would have been unknown to an early twentieth-century forger. (Note: Ogden 1998, p. 18, cited in Craddock 2009, p. 375.) Ultrasound scans of the ring presented by Walter Müller in 2002 confirmed that it was hollow, dispelling a longstanding belief that it was solid in construction, which would be unusual for a genuinely Bronze Age ring. Pini suggested that the wear on the decorations of the hoop indicates intensive use, and parallels other rings known to be genuine. Childe similarly suggested that the wear on these parts may suggest that the ring was actually worn, in contrast to Evans's belief.

Kate Cooper, in 2021, wrote that the ring was generally considered fake, but that the 2015 discovery of a ring (designated Ring 2) in the Tomb of the Griffin Warrior, a shaft grave at Pylos dating to the Late Helladic IIA period (c. 1400 – c. 1300 BCE) with similar iconography, particularly the ivy, pointed towards its authenticity. (Note: Cooper 2021, p. 92, citing Davis & Stocker 2016, p. 648, n. 77. For the absolute dates, see Shelmerdine 2008, p. 4. On Ring 2 from the Tomb of the Griffin Warrior, see Yamasaki 2022, pp. 98–99, with fig. 4.)

== See also ==
- Nestor's Cup (Mycenae) and Nestor's Cup (Pithekoussai), two other ancient artefacts imaginatively named after Nestor.

== Bibliography ==
- Caubet, Annie (2002). "Animals in Syro-Palestinian Art". A History of the Animal World in the Ancient Near East. Leiden: Brill. pp. 211–236. ISBN 90-04-12126-9.
- Childe, V. Gordon (1925). "The Ring of Nestor: A Glimpse into the Minoan After-World and a Sepulchral Treasure of Gold Signet-Rings and Bead-Seals from Thisbe, Boeotia". Nature. 116 (2922): 635–636. Bibcode:1925Natur.116..635C. doi:10.1038/116635a0. ISSN 1476-4687.
- Cooper, Kate (2021). "Biography of the Bull-Leaper: A 'Minoan' Ivory Figurine and Collecting Antiquity". In Cooper, Kate (ed.). New Approaches to Ancient Material Culture in the Greek & Roman World. Monumenta Graeca et Romana. Vol. 27. Leiden: Brill. pp. 79–100. doi:10.1163/9789004440753_005. ISBN 978-90-04-44075-3.
- Craddock, Paul (2009). Scientific Investigation of Copies, Fakes and Forgeries. Abingdon: Taylor & Francis. ISBN 978-1-136-43601-7.
- Davis, Jack L.; Stocker, Sharon R. (2016). "The Lord of the Gold Rings: The Griffin Warrior of Pylos". Hesperia. 85 (4): 627–655. doi:10.2972/hesperia.85.4.0627. ISSN 0018-098X. JSTOR 10.2972/hesperia.85.4.0627 – via Academia.edu.
- Eliopoulos, Theodore (2013). "Some Observations on the Iconography of the 'Ring of Nestor'". Annuario della Scuola Archeologica di Atene e delle Missioni Italiane in Oriente. 91: 209–228. ISSN 2653-9926 – via Academia.edu.
- Evans, Arthur (1925). "'The Ring of Nestor': A Glimpse into the Minoan After-World and a Sepulchral Treasure of Gold Signet-Rings and Bead-Seals from Thisbê, Boeotia". The Journal of Hellenic Studies. 45 (1): 1–75. doi:10.2307/624904. ISSN 0075-4269. JSTOR 624904.
- Evans, Arthur (1930). The Palace of Minos at Knossos. Vol. 3. London: Macmillan and Co. OCLC 312350990 – via Internet Archive.
- Galanakis, Yannis (2013). The Aegean World. A Guide to the Cycladic, Minoan and Mycenaean Antiquities in the Ashmolean Museum. Oxford: Ashmolean Museum. ISBN 978-960-6878-59-6.
- Gere, Cathy (2009). Knossos and the Prophets of Modernism. Chicago: The University of Chicago Press. doi:10.7208/9780226289557 (inactive 12 July 2025). ISBN 978-0-226-28954-0.
- Hudler, Angelika (2019). "(E)scaping arguments: Gemmae Dubitandae and their Position in Exploring Aegean Bronze Age Archaeology". In Ayash, N.; Fritzsche, F.; Wolf, D. (eds.). No (E)scape? Towards a Relational Archaeology of Man, Nature, and Thing in the Aegean Bronze Age, Heidelberg 23–25 March 2018 (PDF). pp. 1–12.
- Hughes-Brock, Helen; Boardman, John (2018). Pini, Ingo; Müller, Walter (eds.). The Ashmolean Museum, vol. 2. Corpus der minoischen und mykenischen Siegel. Vol. 6. Heidelberg: Propylaeum. ISBN 978-3-946654-62-9.
- Karadimas, Nektarios; Momigliano, Nicoletta (2004). "On the Term 'Minoan' before Sir Arthur Evans's work in Crete (1894)" (PDF). Studi Micenei ed Egeo Anatolici. 44 (2): 79–94. ISSN 2532-1757.
- Krzyszkowska, Olga (2005). Aegean Seals: An Introduction. Bulletin of the Institute of Classical Studies Supplements. Vol. 85. University of London Press. ISBN 978-0-900587-97-9.
- Lapatin, Kenneth D. S. (2002). Mysteries of the Snake Goddess: Art, Desire and the Forging of History. Boston: Houghton Mifflin. ISBN 0-618-14475-7 – via Internet Archive.
- MacGillivray, Joseph Alexander (2000). Minotaur: Sir Arthur Evans and the Archaeology of the Minoan Myth. New York: Hill and Wang. ISBN 978-0-8090-3035-4.
- Marinatos, Nanno; Jackson, Briana (2011). "The Pseudo-Minoan Nestor Ring and Its Egyptian Iconography". Journal of Ancient Egyptian Interconnections. 3 (2): 6–15. doi:10.2458/azu_jaei_v03i2_marinatos. ISSN 1944-2815.
- Marinatos, Nanno (2015). "On the Authenticity of the 'Minos Ring': Evidence from Spyridon Marinatos's Archives". In Panagiotopoulos, Diamantis (ed.). Ein Minoer im Exil: Festschrift für Wolf-Dietrich Niemeier [A Minoan in Exile: Festschrift for Wolf-Dietrich Niemeier]. Universitätsforschungen zur Prähistorischen Archäologie. Vol. 270. Bonn: Dr. Rudolf Habelt GmbH. pp. 271–280. ISBN 978-3-7749-3971-4 – via Academia.edu.
- Müller, Walter (2003). "Precision Measurements of Minoan and Mycenaean Gold Rings with Ultrasound". In Foster, Karen Polinger; Laffineur, Robert (eds.). Metron: Measuring the Aegean Bronze Age. Aegeum. Vol. 9. University of Liège. pp. 475–482. ISBN 978-1-935488-17-0.
- Nilsson, Martin P. (1927). The Minoan–Mycenaean Religion and Its Survival in Greek Religion. Lund: C. W. K. Gleerup. OCLC 3806032 – via Internet Archive.
- Ogden, Jack (1998). "The Jewellery of Dark Age Greece: Construction and Cultural Connections". In Williams, Dyfri (ed.). The Art of the Greek Goldsmith. London: British Museum Press. pp. 14–21. ISBN 0-7141-2211-4 – via Academia.edu.
- Ogden, Daniel (2013). Drakon: Dragon Myth and Serpent Cult in the Greek and Roman Worlds. Oxford University Press. ISBN 978-0-19-955732-5.
- Pini, Ingo (1998). "The 'Ring of Nestor'". Oxford Journal of Archaeology. 17 (1): 1–13. doi:10.1111/1468-0092.00048. ISSN 0262-5253 – via Wiley Online Library.
- Poursat, Jean-Claude (1976). "Notes d'iconographie préhellénique : dragons et crocodiles" [Notes on Pre-Hellenic Iconography: Dragons and Crocodiles]. Bulletin de Correspondance Hellénique (in French). 100 (1): 461–474. doi:10.3406/bch.1976.2058. ISSN 2241-0104.
- Sakellarakis, Yiannis (1973). "Über die Echtheit des sogenannten Nestorrings" [On the Authenticity of the So-Called "Ring of Nestor"]. Πεπραγμένα του Γ΄ Διεθνούς Κρητολογικού Συνεδρίου [Proceedings of the 3rd National Cretological Conference] (in German). Vol. 1. Athens: Ministry of Culture and Sciences. pp. 303–318. OCLC 1035251362.
- Shelmerdine, Cynthia (2008). "Introduction: Background, Methods and Sources". In Shelmerdine, Cynthia (ed.). The Cambridge Companion to the Aegean Bronze Age. Cambridge University Press. pp. 1–18. doi:10.1017/CCOL9780521814447.001. ISBN 978-1-139-00189-2.
- Vlachopoulos, Andreas G. (2020). "The Ring of Nestor and the Quest for Authenticity". In Blakolmer, Fritz (ed.). Current Approaches and New Perspectives in Aegean Iconography. Presses universitaires de Louvain. pp. 223–252. ISBN 978-2-87558-968-2 – via Academia.edu.
- Yamasaki, Mari (2022). "From Athirat to Aphrodite: The Feminine Side of the Sea in the Late Bronze and Early Iron Age Eastern Mediterranean". In Coppini, Constanza; Cyrus, Georg; Golestaneh, Hamaseh (eds.). Bridging the Gap: Disciplines, Times, and Spaces in Dialogue. Vol. 3. Sessions 4 and 6 from the Conference Broadening Horizons 6 Held at the Freie Universiät Berlin, 24–28 June 2019. Oxford: Archaeopress. pp. 94–111. ISBN 978-1-80327-341-9 – via Academia.edu.
