= Echecrates of Thessaly =

Thessalian military officer

Echecrates (Greek: Ἐχεκράτης) was a Thessalian military officer of Ptolemy Philopator in the Fourth Syrian War with Antiochus the Great in 219 BC. Echecrates was employed in the levying of troops and their arrangement into separate companies. He was entrusted with the command of the Greek forces in Ptolemy's pay, and of all the mercenary cavalry. According to Polybius, he did good service in the war, especially at the Battle of Raphia in 217 BC.

He is also known for kidnapping and raping a young maiden serving as the oracle at Delphi, causing oracles serving thereafter to be older women who instead dressed youthfully.

Echecrates the Thessalian, having arrived at the shrine and beheld the virgin who uttered the oracle, became enamoured of her because of her beauty, smacked her away and violated her; and that the Delphians because of this deplorable occurrence passed a law that in the future a virgin should no longer prophesy but that an elderly woman of fifty would declare the Oracles and that she would be dressed in the costume of a virgin, as a sort of reminder of the prophetess of olden times.
