= Herbert William Parke =

Irish classicist (1903–1986)

- Born: 7 September 1903; Moneymore
- Died: 20 January 1986 (aged 82)
- Spouse: Nancy Bankart Gurney (m. 1930)
- Children: 1

Academic background
- Education: PhD, Oxford University (1933)

Academic work
- Discipline: Classicist
- Institutions: Trinity College Dublin

Herbert William Parke (7 September 1903 – 20 January 1986) was an Irish classicist who was professor of ancient history at Trinity College Dublin from 1934 until 1973, and the college's librarian from 1949 until 1965.

== Early life and education ==
Herbert William Parke was born in Moneymore, Ireland on 7 September 1903, to civil servant William Parke and Bertha (née Blair). He attended the Coleraine Academical Institution in County Londonderry until his family moved to northern England, when he enrolled in Bradford Grammar School.

Parke went to Wadham College, Oxford on a scholarship in 1922. He took firsts in Honour Moderations in 1924 and Literae humaniores in 1926. He was a Read scholar in 1927 and in 1928 was a Craven fellow and won the Cromer essay prize. In 1930, he married Nancy Bankart Gurney, with whom he had a daughter. He received his PhD from Oxford University in 1933.

== Academic career ==
In 1929, Parke was elected a Fellow of Trinity College Dublin. He was a prolific writer, often publishing in journals such as Hermathena. He published his first book, Greek Mercenary Soldiers, in 1933. That year, he became a fellow of the Royal Irish Academy.

Parke was appointed professor of ancient history at Trinity College Dublin in 1934, a position he held until his retirement in 1973. He led its School of Classics alongside Donald Ernest Wilson Wormell and William Bedell Stanford, and helped to establish the school's international reputation. His most significant scholarly work was The Delphic Oracle (1939), which established his reputation as an expert in ancient Greek history. He co-created a second edition with Wormell, which was published in two volumes in 1956.

Parke took leave from the college during between 1942 and 1944 so he could serve as temporary principal of the Board of Trade in London during World War II. In 1947, he was elected fellow of the Royal Numismatic Society.

He was also L. C. Purser Lecturer in Archaeology, and in 1952 was appointed vice provost of Trinity College Dublin. He was an influential figure in the college's reformation during the early 1950s.

Between 1949 and 1965, he served as librarian of the library of Trinity College. He was responsible for helping to modernise the library in the postwar period. In the late 1950s, Parke hired Marvin Leonard Colker to improve the library's catalogues of Medieval Latin texts, resulting in the creation of the Colker catalogue. In 1953, Parke also supervised the rebinding of the 9th century Book of Kells into four volumes.

He was a member of the Institute for Advanced Study's School of Historical Studies in 1960. In 1967, he published two further books: Greek Oracles and The Oracles of Zeus.

In 1973, Parke retired from teaching and became Fellow Emeritus at Trinity College Dublin. He received an honorary degree from Queen's University Belfast in 1974 and the New University of Ulster in 1978. His least successful book, Festivals of the Athenians, was published in 1977. In 1979, he was a visiting scholar at University of Southampton. He was made an honorary fellow of Durham University in 1982. He published The Oracles of Apollo in Asia Minor, which was well received.

== Later life and death ==
After his retirement, he moved to Epsom, England, with his family. He later moved to Redcar in the 1980s, where he lived until his death on 20 January 1986. At the time of his death, he was working on the manuscript for Sibyls and Sibylline Prophecy in Classical Antiquity, which was edited and published posthumously in 1988. An obituary written by George Leonard Huxley in the academic journal Gnomon called Parke "the most eminent of Irish ancient historians".
