= Pierre Amandry =

French art historian and archaeologist

Pierre Amandry was a French hellenist, especially interested in ancient Greece and its relationships with south-west Asia. He was born at Troyes on December 31, 1912, and died in Paris on February 21, 2006. A large part of his work was on the site of Delphi, excavated by the French School at Athens, of which he was secretary general from 1941 to 1948 and director from 1969 to 1981.

== Career ==
He joined the École Normale Supérieure in 1933, become a professor in 1937, and was member of the French School at Athens from 1937 to 1941. During this time, he carried out excavations in the sanctuary of Delphi, where he discovered treasure of gold and ivory under the sacred way. The study of these objects led him to be interested in south-west Asian art. From 1951 to 1969, he taught at the University of Strasbourg.

His thesis on La mantique apollinienne à Delphes (The Apollonic Divination at Delphi) refuted the romantic image of the consultation of the Pythia in favor of a more prosaic function of the Delphic oracle.

He wrote a of articles concerning the monuments at Delphi, in particular the temple.

He was elected to the Académie des Inscriptions et Belles-Lettres in 1972.

Aside from his work on ancient Greece, he was equally interested in modern Greece and in travelers. He translated "Christ recrucifié", written by Nikos Kazandzaki (1955), into French.

== Publications ==
- 1939. "Rapport préliminaire sur les statues chryséléphantines de Delphes" (in Bulletin de Correspondance hellénique).
- 1939. "Convention religieuse conclue entre Delphes et Skiathos" (ibid.).
- 1940-1941. "La colonne dorique de la tholos de Marmaria" (en collaboration avec J. Bousquet; in Bulletin de Correspondance hellénique).
- 1944-1945. "Statuette d'ivoire d'un dompteur de lion" (in Syria). - 1946. Ilias Vénézis. Terre éolienne (traduction).
- 1950. La mantique apollinienne à Delphes, Essai sur le fonctionnement de l’oracle (thèse principale).
- 1952. "Observations sur les monuments de l’Héraion d’Argos" (in Hesperia).
- 1953. Fouilles de Delphes. II, Topographie et architecture. La colonne du Sphinx des Naxiens et le portique des Athéniens (thèse complémentaire).
- 1953. Collection Hélène Stathatos. I, Les bijoux antiques.
- 1956. "Chaudrons à protomes de taureau en Orient et en Grèce" (in The Aegean and the Near East. Studies presented to Hetty Goldman).
- 1958. "Objets orientaux en Grèce et en Italie aux VIIIe et VIIe siècles avant Jésus-Christ" (in Syria).
- 1959. "Toreutique achéménide" (in Antike Kunst).
- 1960-1961. "Thémistocle : un décret et un portrait" (in Bulletin de la Faculté des Lettres de Strasbourg).
- 1961. "Athènes au lendemain des guerres médiques" (in Revue de l’Université de Bruxelles).
- 1963. Collection Hélène Stathatos. III, Objets antiques et byzantins.
- 1963. "Plaques d'or de Delphes" (in Athenische Mitteilungen. Festschrift Emil Kunze).
- 1965. "Un motif ‘scythe’ en Iran et en Grèce" (in Journal of Near east Studies. Erich F. Schmidt Memorial).
- 1968. "La Grèce d'Asie et d'Anatolie du VIIIe au VIe siècle avant Jésus-Christ" (in Anatolica).
- 1969. "Notes de topographie et d’architecture delphiques : V, Le temple d’Apollon" (in Bulletin de Correspondance hellénique).
- 1976-1977. "Trépieds d’Athènes. I, Dionysies. II, Thargélies" (ibid.).
- 1977. "Notes de topographie et d’architecture delphiques. VI, La fontaine Castalie" (ibid., suppl. IV).
- 1977. "Statue de taureau en argent" (ibid.).
- 1978. "Notes de topographie et d’architecture delphiques. VII, La fontaine Castalie (compléments)" (ibid.).
- 1980. "Sur les concours argiens" (ibid., suppl. VI).
- 1981. "L’Antre corycien dans les textes antiques et modernes" (ibid., suppl. VII).
- 1981. "L’Antre corycien. L’exploration archéologique de la grotte" (ibid., suppl. VII). - 1981. "Chronique delphique (1970-1981)".
- 1987. "Trépieds de Delphes et du Péloponnèse" (ibid.).
- 1990. "La fête des Pythia" (in Praktika tês Akademias Athenôn).
- 1992. "Delphes oublié" (in CRAI).
- 1992. "Fouilles de Delphes et raisins de Corinthe : histoire d’une négociation" (in La redécouverte de Delphes).
- 1995. "Schliemann, le 'trésor de Priam' et le musée du Louvre" (in Dossiers d’archéologie).
- 1997. "Propos sur l’oracle de Delphes" (in Journal des Savants).
- 1997. "Monuments chorégiques d’Athènes" (in Bulletin de Correspondance hellénique).
- 1998. "Notes de topographie et d’architecture delphiques. X. Le 'socle marathonien' et le trésor des Athéniens" (ibid.).
