= Marvin Leonard Colker =

American palaeographer (1927–2020)

- Born: March 19, 1927; Pittsburgh, Pennsylvania, US
- Died: April 8, 2020 (aged 93); Charlottesville, Virginia, US

Academic background
- Education: BA, University of Pittsburgh; PhD, Harvard University

Academic work
- Discipline: Medievalist, classicist and palaeographer
- Institutions: University of Virginia

Marvin Leonard Colker (March 19, 1927 – April 8, 2020) was an American medievalist, classicist and palaeographer. He was a faculty member of the University of Virginia from 1953 until his retirement in 1998. He is known for creating the Colker catalogue of Medieval Latin texts in the Library of Trinity College Dublin.

== Early life and education ==
Marvin Leonard Colker was born on March 19, 1927, in Pittsburgh, Pennsylvania. In 1948, he graduated summa cum laude from University of Pittsburgh with a Bachelor of Arts degree in Classics. He graduated from Harvard University with a PhD in 1951. His doctoral dissertation was a critical edition of Walter of Châtillon's Alexandreis.

== Career ==
Colker had two postgraduate fellowships in the 1950s, including a Fulbright fellowship to the University of Paris from 1951 until 1952. He joined the classics department of the University of Virginia (UVA) in 1953 as its first medievalist, and spent the rest of his academic career there.

Colker chaired the UVA classics department from 1964 until 1968, and became full professor of classics in 1967. His research focused on Medieval palaeography and textual criticism.

In the 1950s, Colker began cataloguing the 450 Medieval Latin manuscripts of the Library of Trinity College Dublin. He made regular summertime visits to Dublin over the course of 30 years in order to work on the catalogue. In 1977, he received a Guggenheim Fellowship. Colker received an honorary doctorate from Trinity College Dublin in 1987.

Colker's catalogue was published in 1991 as Trinity College Dublin Library: Descriptive Catalogue of the Medieval and Renaissance Latin Manuscripts. The text is colloquially known as the 'Colker catalogue' and was the first comprehensive catalogue of the library's Latin manuscripts. Colker retired from teaching at University of Virginia in 1998.

In February 2018, an exhibition titled "Illuminating the Middle Ages" was held in Colker's honour. That month the journal Hermathena also published a special issue dedicated to his work, titled Fabellae Dublinenses Revisited and other Essays in Honour of Marvin Colker.

== Personal life ==
Colker was nicknamed "Mark".

Colker married Hazel Robinson on November 28, 1959, and they had a son, Philip.

Colker died at his home in Charlottesville, Virginia, on April 8, 2020.
