= Nanno Marinatos =

Greek archaeologist (born 1950)

Ourania "Nanno" Marinatos (Greek: Ουρανία "Ναννώ" Μαρινάτου; born 1950) is a Greek archaeologist who is professor emerita of Classics and Ancient Mediterranean Studies at the University of Illinois Chicago, whose research focuses on the Minoan civilisation, especially Minoan religion.

== Early life and education ==
Marinatos was born in Athens in 1950; her parents were Aimila Loverdos and Spyridon Marinatos, an archaeologist of the Bronze Age Aegean. Named Ourania after her grandmother, she was nicknamed "Nanno" by her father after a woman associated by ancient sources with the poet Mimnermus. Marinatos studied at the German School in Athens, from where she graduated in 1968. She studied classical philology and archaeology at the University of Colorado at Boulder, receiving her PhD in 1979.

== Career ==
Marinatos is Professor Emerita of Classics and Ancient Mediterranean Studies at the University of Illinois Chicago, where she was previously Head of Department. Prior to joining the University of Illinois Chicago in 2001, she taught at Oberlin College, Ohio, the University of Bergen, and the University of Zurich. She has excavated at the prehistoric site of Akrotiri on Santorini and at Tell el Da'ba in Egypt. She has published research on Minoan religion, particularly on the roles of iconography and symbolism; on Arthur Evans' excavations at Knossos; on the site of Akrotiri; on the work of her father Spyridon; and on ancient Greek religion more widely. She has been described as 'a leading figure in the area of interconnections between the ancient Aegean and the wider world of the Eastern Mediterranean, the Near East, and Egypt'.
