= Friedrich Matz =

German archaeologist

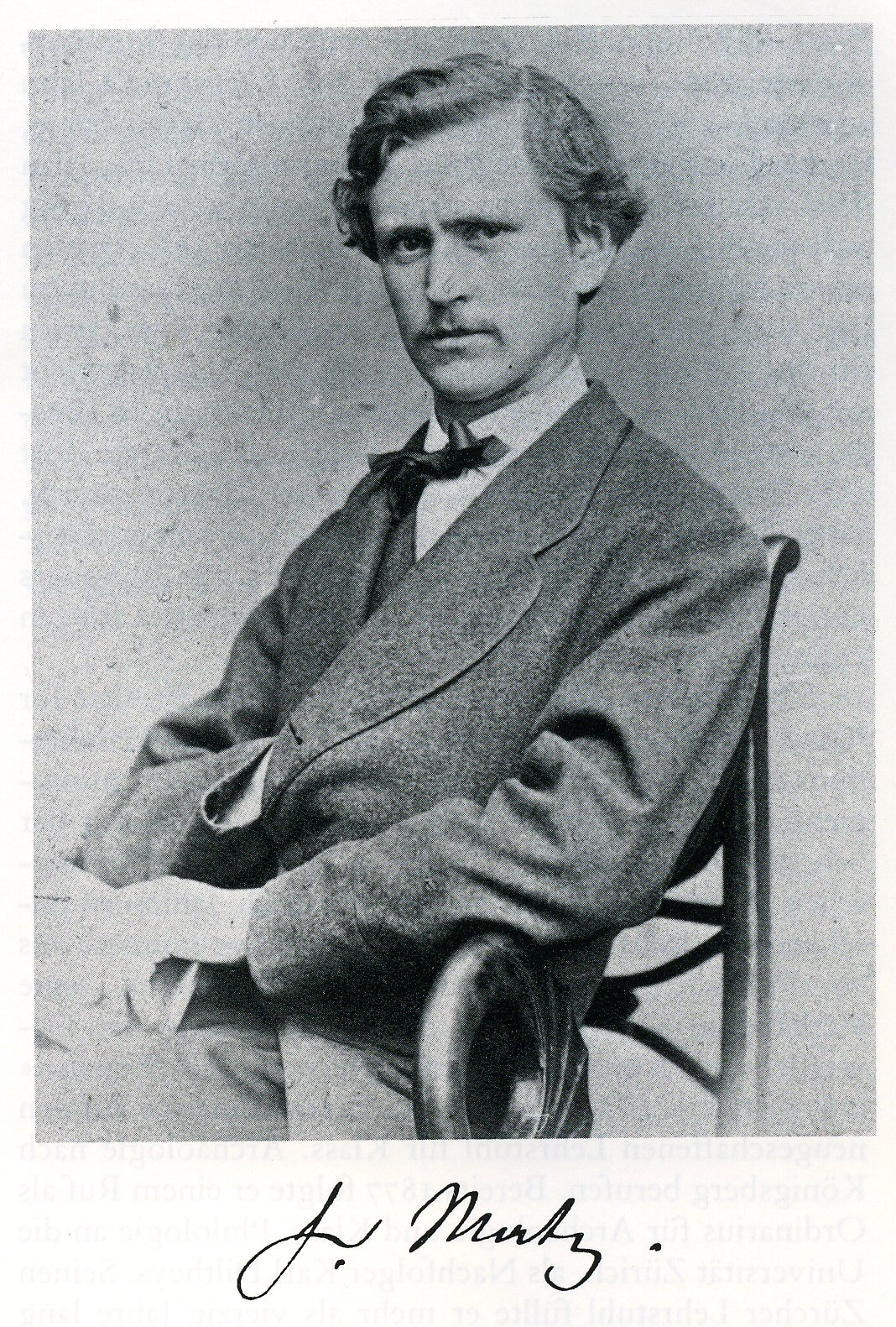
Friedrich Matz

Friedrich Matz (13 October 1843 in Lübeck – 30 December 1874 in Berlin) was a German archaeologist. His nephew, also named Friedrich Matz (1890–1974), was as well a noted archaeologist.

From 1863 he studied philology and archaeology at the University of Bonn as a favored student of Otto Jahn. In 1867 he received his doctorate with a dissertation thesis on Philostratus, titled De Philostratorum in describendis imaginibus fide specimen prius. Afterwards, he took a study trip to Greece and Italy, during which time, he conducted extensive studies of ancient sarcophagi. In 1870 he was tasked by the Central Directorate of the German Archaeological Institute to create a register of ancient sarcophagi. During the same year, he obtained his habilitation at the University of Göttingen.

In other research, he investigated ancient statues in England and France, and examined a collection of long-forgotten manuscripts of antiquity belonging to the Duke of Coburg-Gotha. In 1873 he became an associate professor at the University of Halle, and during the following year, relocated to the University of Berlin. He died in Berlin on 30 December 1874, aged 31.

== Selected writings ==
- Sarcofaghi con rappresentanze del mito di Meleagro, 1869 – Sarcophagi with a representation of the myth of Meleager.
- Sui sarcofaghi con rappresentanze delle dodici fatiche di Ercole, 1869 – Sarcophagi with a representation of the 12 labors of Hercules.
- H. Brunns zweite Vertheidigung der Philostratischen Gemälde, 1870 – Heinrich Brunn's second defense of Philostratus paintings.
- Statua di Donna Sedente del Palazzo Barberini, 1871 – Seated female statue at the Palazzo Barberini.
- Der Parthenon herausgegeben von Adolf Michaelis, 1871 – The Parthenon edition of Adolf Michaelis.
- Über eine dem Herzog von Coburg-Gotha gehörige Sammlung alter Handzeichnungen nach Antiken, 1871 – On the Duke of Coburg-Gotha's collection of old drawings from antiquity.
- Mittheilungen über Sammlungen älterer Handzeichnungen nach Antiken, 1872 – Discourses on collections of older manuscripts from antiquity.
- Antike bildwerke in Rom, mit ausschluss der grösseren sammlungen (with Friedrich von Duhn; 3 volumes, 1881–82) – Ancient statues in Rome, with the exclusion of the larger collections.
