= Dictionnaire des Antiquités Grecques et Romaines =

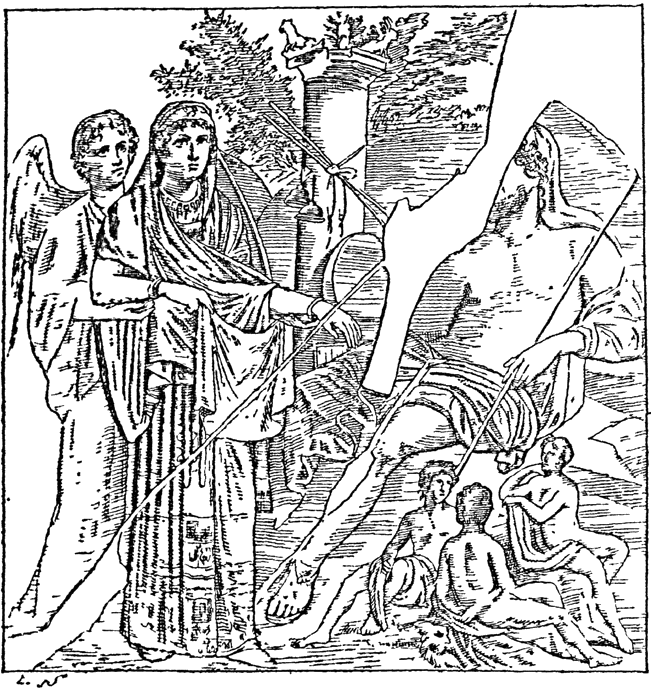
Illustration of a fragmentary relief from the Dictionnaire des antiquités grecques et romaines

The Dictionnaire des antiquités grecques et romaines (abbrev. or DAG or DAGR) is a large illustrated French-language dictionary of Ancient Greece and Rome edited by Charles Victor Daremberg and Edmond Saglio. It was published in 10 volumes between 1873 and 1919 by the publisher Hachette Livre in Paris. The full title describes the work as based on both texts and monuments, with explication of the terms that apply to customs, institutions, religion, the arts, science, clothing, furnishings, war, seafaring, trades, coinage, weights and measures, and generally the public and private lives of people in antiquity.

Individual entries consist of (sometimes book-length) articles by prominent classical scholars, François Lenormant among them. It aimed to compete directly with the Altertumswissenschaft of German universities, who were the uncontested masters in the field from 1810 onward. In an 1887 review of the first volume of the Dictionnaire for The Classical Review, John E. B. Mayor praised the result, saying "No other nation as yet possesses anything approaching to it in beauty and completeness; it is absolutely necessary to every classical library and to every public library frequented by scholars or artists."

The Dictionnaire represented a work of extraordinary volume and was published at a slow pace. It took eleven issues to finally complete volume 1, which spanned 1,703 pages and only covered through the letter C, in 1886. The first volume included 3,000 illustrations. Each of the eleven parts of the first volume, printed in large quarto form, was sold for five francs. Some thirty years after it was begun, the Dictionnaire had only reached the middle of the alphabet.

Today the dictionary has value as a legacy work, amongst the other large dictionaries of antiquity that appeared in Europe around the same time: starting in 1893, the Germans published the monumental Realencyclopädie der Classischen Altertumswissenschaft in eighty-three volumes; the Italian Dizionario epigrafico di antichità romana began in 1886; the English also published several dictionaries concerning the fields of classical antiquity, including William Smith's 1,300-page A Dictionary of Greek and Roman Antiquities, first published in 1842.

Although the articles are sourced from scholarship in a number of different fields, its contents are no longer up-to-date because of archaeological, epigraphical, and numismatic discoveries made in the years since the Dictionnaire was written. The problems of studies of classical antiquity have also been profoundly renewed in the intervening years thanks to the contributions of sociology and anthropology, fields from which specialists in antiquity have integrated the methods.
