= Robert Laffineur =

Robert Laffineur is emeritus professor of archaeology at the University of Liège and an authority on Mycenaean Greece. He is the founder and co-organizer of the Rencontres égéennes internationales (International Aegean Conferences) in 1986, and editor of Aegaeum: Annales liégeoises d’archéologie égéenne, which has been published in forty-two volumes since 1987. In 2014, he was appointed as Honorary Consul of the Hellenic Republic in Liège.

In 2016, he received a festschrift of studies of the Mycenaean world on his 70th birthday edited by Jan Driessen. His former doctoral student, Richard Veymiers, contributed to the volume with a biographical and bibliographical study of Robert Laffineur.
