= Edmond Saglio =

French archaeologist

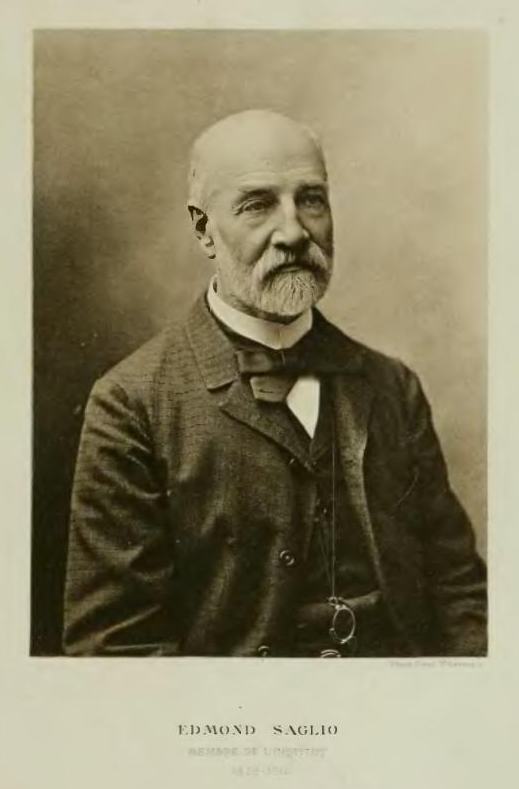
Edmond Saglio (1828-1911)

Edmond Saglio (9 June 1828 in Paris – 7 December 1911) was a French archaeologist. He was the son-in-law of journalist Édouard Charton (1807-1890).

From 1871 to 1893, he worked as a curator at the Louvre, followed by a directorship at the Musée de Cluny (1893-1903). In 1887 he became a member of the Académie des inscriptions et belles-lettres.

With medical historian Charles Victor Daremberg (1817-1872), he was editor of the 10-volume Dictionnaire des Antiquités Grecques et Romaines.

== Works about Edmond Saglio ==
- "Notice sur la vie et les travaux de M. Edmond Saglio lue dans la séance du 16 mai 1913" by Ulysse Chevalier, Paris : Firmin Didot, 1913.
- "Notice nécrologique sur Edmond Saglio, membre de l'Institut, membre honoraire de la Société nationale des antiquaires de France (1828-1911)" by Maurice Roy, Nogent-le-Rotrou : Imprimerie Daupeley-Gouverneur, 1926.
