= Maria Stamatopoulou =

Greek archaeologist

- Education: Somerville College, Oxford
- Occupation: Classical Archaeologist

Maria Stamatopoulou is a Greek Classical archaeologist specialising in Central Greece, and Thessaly in particular. She is associate professor of classical archaeology at the University of Oxford, and a Fellow of Lincoln College, Oxford.

Stamatopoulou completed her BA in history, archaeology and history of art at the National and Kapodistrian University of Athens. She completed her DPhil at Somerville College at the University of Oxford in 1999 entitled 'Burial customs in Thessaly in the Classical and Hellenistic periods'.

In 2002, Stamatopoulou joined Lincoln College as an early career fellow, and was later appointed as an associate professor in classical archaeology and tutorial fellow in 2006.

Stamatopoulou's research focusses on the archaeology of central and northern Greece, especially Thessaly. She is responsible for the publication of a number of early twentieth-century excavations in this region, including the cemeteries of Pharsalus and Metropolis, the sanctuary of Athena Polias at Phthiotic Thebes, and the city of Demetrias.

== Selected publications ==
- "Thessalians Abroad, the Case of Pharsalos", in Mediterranean Historical Review, vol. 22.2 (2007), pp. 211–236.
- Excavating Classical Culture: Recent Archaeological Discoveries in Greece (2002) (British Archaeological Reports International Series 1031), editor, with Marina Yeroulanou.
- "The Pasikrata Sanctuary at Demetrias and the alleged funerary sanctuaries of Thessaly" (2014). Kernos 27: 207-255.
- "The ‘banquet’ motif on the funerary stelai from Demetrias", in C.M. Draycott and M. Stamatopoulou (eds), Dining & Death. Interdisciplinary perspectives on the 'Funerary Banquet' in ancient art, burial and belief. (Louvain 2016) 405-479
- ‘Demetrias: The Archaeology of a Cosmopolitan Macedonian Harbour’, in M. Kalaitzi, P. Paschidis, C. Antonetti and A.-M. Guimier-Sorbets (eds), Βορειοελλαδικ?. Tales from the lands of the ethne. Essays in honour of Miltiades B. Hatzopoulos / Histoires du monde des ethné. Études en l’honneur de Miltiade B. Hatzopoulos (Μελετ?ματα 78: Athens 2018) 343-376
