= Charles Victor Daremberg =

French librarian, medical historian and classical philologist

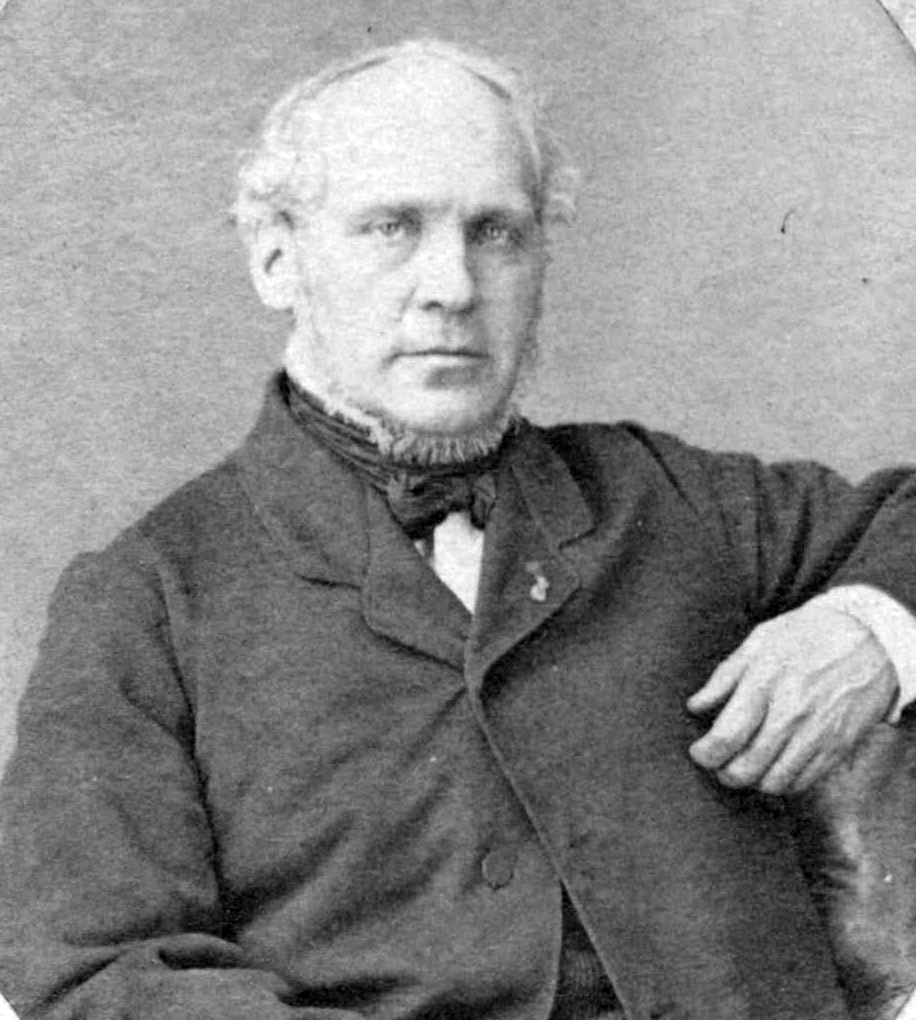
Charles Victor Daremberg (1817-1872)

Charles Victor Daremberg (14 March 1817, Dijon – 24 October 1872) was a French librarian, medical historian and classical philologist.

He began his medical studies in Dijon, later relocating to Paris, where he served as librarian of the Académie de Médecine and at the Bibliothèque Mazarine. Also, he gave lectures at the Collège de France and held the chair of Histoire de la médecine.

In the field of classical philology, he translated works by Galen and Hippocrates. With archaeologist Edmond Saglio (1828-1911), he was editor of Dictionnaire des Antiquités Grecques et Romaines, later published in ten volumes between 1877 and 1919.

== Biography ==
Charles-Victor Daremberg began his medical studies in his hometown of Dijon and continued them in Paris. Librarian at the Académie nationale de médecine, then at the Bibliothèque Mazarine, he went on to become a lecturer at the Collège de France and holder of the chair in the History of medicine.

In addition, he carried out several missions in various libraries across Europe to catalog, describe, and collate the medical manuscripts preserved there.

He is the author of works on Galen (thesis, 1841) and Hippocrates (1843, translation of selected works).We owe him the only French translations of Galen treatises available today.

He is known to the academic community for his contribution to the Dictionnaire des Antiquités Grecques et Romaines (Dictionary of Greek and Roman Antiquities) between 1850 and 1870.

== Bibliography ==
- This article incorporates text based on a translation of an equivalent article at the French Wikipedia, listed as:
  - Académie nationale de médecine.
  - BIUM Bibliothèque d'histoire de la médecine et de l'art dentaire
  - Dictionnaire de Ch. Daremberg et E. Saglio (1877)
