= 2025 in archaeology =

This page lists significant events in 2025 in archaeology.

== Excavations ==
- Summer – Excavation of Bronze Age site on St Michael's Mount, Cornwall (England).
- August – Excavations started at the site of Scotland's first skatepark, Kelvin Wheelies in Kelvingrove Park, Glasgow (1978). Sweet wrappers were used to date its infilling.

== Finds ==
=== January ===
- 9
  - A joint French-Swiss archaeological team uncovered the richly decorated tomb of Tetinebefou, a high-status healer or "wizard doctor", dating to Egypt's 5th Dynasty, near the Saqqara necropolis, revealing rare medical instruments and inscriptions indicating his role as a priest and physician.
  - Archaeologists announced the recovery of medieval royal treasures that had been hidden in the crypts of the Vilnius Cathedral in Lithuania since the outbreak of World War II in 1939.
- 14 – Mexico's Instituto Nacional de Antropología e Historia reported on the results of a mapping project, begun in 2018, that unveiled the lay-out of X’baatún's core area.
- 17 – The director of the Pompeii Archeological Park revealed the discovery of a large thermal complex.

=== February ===
- 12 – The Museum of London Archaeology announced the find of remains of the first Roman basilica in the City of London.
- 14 – The Journal of the American Chemical Society published the results of a study about the smell of mummies. It found that even after 5,000 years in a sarcophagus, mummified bodies from ancient Egypt still smell quite nice.
- 19 – Archaeologists announced the discovery of the Tomb of Thutmose II, the first royal Egyptian tomb to be discovered since the discovery of the tomb of Tutankhamun in 1922.
- 26 – Archaeologists announced the discovery of a large frieze at the House of Thiasus in Pompeii, depicting the Dionysian Mysteries.

=== March ===
- 5 – Nature published a study showing that the oldest human-crafted bone tools on record are 1.5 million years old, found in Tanzania.
- 12 — In a cave in Sima del Elefante, Spain, scientists have found part of a human face of someone who lived between 1.1 and 1.4 million years ago. It’s believed to be the oldest facial fragment ever found in Europe.
- 14 – Archaeologists from the French Institute of Oriental Archaeology uncovered iron shackles at the Ghozza site in Egypt's Eastern Desert, providing evidence of forced labor in Ptolemaic gold mines during the 3rd century BCE.
- 15 – An Egyptian-American archaeological mission announced the discovery of a royal tomb from the Abydos Dynasty and 32 ostraca inscribed in Demotic and Greek scripts, detailing commercial transactions and tax payments.
- 25
  - The Yorkshire Museum announced the discovery of the Melsonby Hoard, a large collection of Iron Age items, in a field near Melsonby, England.
  - Archaeologists in the Judean Desert announced the discovery of a 2,200-year-old pyramid, along with papyrus documents, Hellenistic-era coins, weapons and tools, dated back to the Ptolemaic period.

=== April ===
- 2 – Archaeologists with the Vienna Museum announce the discovery of a mass grave in Simmering district in Vienna, Austria, of around 150 Ancient Roman soldiers from the 1st century who likely died in a battle.
- 8 – Archeologists working in the ancient Mayan city of Tikal, Guatemala discover a 1,700-year-old altar.
- 12 – Archaeologists uncovered royal wine production sites in a 3,500-year-old Egyptian settlement beneath Hellenistic ruins at Kom el-Nugus, located 27 kilometres (17 mi) from Alexandria, dating back to the 18th Dynasty.
- 17 – An extensive Roman-era horse cemetery containing more than 100 equine skeletons, believed to be associated with a Roman cavalry unit active around A.D. 100–150 in Stuttgart, Germany.
- 18 – A joint Egyptian-American team discovered the tomb of Prince Waserif-Re, son of Userkaf of the 5th Dynasty, along with 32 ostraca with Demotic and Greek texts revealed records of taxes and trade.
- 19 – A hieroglyphic inscription featuring the cartouches of Ramses III was reported discovered in Wadi Rum, southern Jordan, marking the first known evidence of the pharaoh's presence in the area.
- 24 – Archaeologists from the University of Barcelona confirm that the remains discovered in Valls, Catalonia, Spain, correspond to the ancient Iberian city of Cissa, the scene of the Battle of Cissa during the Second Punic War.
- 25 – An 8,400-year-old Mesolithic stone figurine, dated to between 6400 and 6100 BCE and associated with the early Shomutepe culture, was discovered in Damjili Cave, located in western Azerbaijan's Qazakh District, by a collaborative Azerbaijani-Japanese team.
- 28 – The long-lost Sanctuary of Apollo in Cyprus was rediscovered; originally found in 1885 but later buried under sand. More than 100 statue bases and numerous fragments, including colossal limestone feet were revealed.

=== May ===
- 6 – An 11th-century hoard containing a collection of nearly 300 silver coins was discovered during a forest restoration project near Lübs, Saxony-Anhalt, Germany.
- 14 – A long lost version of the British Magna Carta dating to 1300 is believed to have been found at Harvard University.
- 18 – A Roman-era mosaic panel was discovered in Maryamin, Homs, Syria, during the excavation of a well at a depth of 2.5 metres (8 ft 2 in). The central scene featured the upper part of Tyche, the Greek goddess of fortune.
- 21 – An 18th-century brass eagle, belonging to the period of the Polish–Lithuanian Commonwealth, was discovered in the Chełm Forest District of eastern Poland. The find features a brass or tin-lead eagle badge (12.8 × 11.5 cm) that was once riveted to a pointed-arch brass plate (15 × 19 cm).
- 22 – A joint Egyptian–Canadian archaeological mission identified the owner of the Kampp 23 tomb in Luxor's Asasif necropolis as Amun‑Mes, a high‑ranking official and former Mayor of Thebes during the Ramesside period, also holding titles such as divine father of Amun, tax collector, and overseer of quarry services.
- 24
  - A 5,000-year-old fire altar within a pyramidal structure was uncovered at the Era de Pando site in Peru's Supe Valley, part of the Caral Archaeological Zone.
  - A 2,000-year-old ceramic vessel, which is also the first intact Roman pot found in Ireland, was discovered during excavations at Drumanagh, an Iron Age promontory fort in north Dublin.
- 26 – Three 3,500-year-old tombs were discovered in Luxor's Dra' Abu el-Naga necropolis, dating to Egypt's New Kingdom. The tombs belonged to Amum-em-Ipet (Ramesside period), Baki (grain silo supervisor), and S (scribe and mayor at the Temple of Amun), both from the 18th Dynasty.
- 26 – Polish archaeologists announced the discovery of more than 1,200 archaeological sites in Sudan’s Bayuda Desert including a natron-rich paleolake near Jebel El-Muwelha.
- 29 – Archaeologists announce the discovery of the remains of a nearly 3,000-year-old Mayan complex in Guatemala, revealing sanctuaries, pyramids and a unique canal system.

=== June ===
- 3 – A previously unknown Avar-era cemetery with two log coffin tombs was discovered through aerial photographs revealing rectangular discolorations in a grain field by Hungarian National Museum on the outskirts of Tatabánya, Hungary.
- 5 – A 4,000 square meters Roman villa complex was revealed by the National Institute for Preventive Archaeological Research (Inrap) at the site known as Sainte-Nitasse in Auxerre, France.
- 6 – A well-preserved Viking boat burial containing the remains of a woman accompanied by a small dog was discovered on Senja Island in northern Norway, dating to around AD 900–950.
- 9
  - A 1,700-year-old Roman-period marble sarcophagus was unearthed outside the ancient walls of Caesarea, Israel, featuring a unique carved scene of a drinking contest between the gods Dionysus and Hercules.
  - A 1,700-year-old temple in Syria has been found.
- 12 – A 16th-century merchant vessel, dubbed "Camarat 4", was identified as the deepest shipwreck ever found in French territorial waters. Discovered by the French Navy during a routine seabed survey off Ramatuelle in March 2025, the wreck lay approximately 2,567 metres (8,422 ft) beneath the Mediterranean surface.
- 15
  - A well-preserved Hellenistic–Roman domestic structure known as House 19, which included an artisanal workshop equipped with clay molds as well as ovens and basins, suggesting small-scale, home-based craft production was revealed at the ancient Greek city of Finziade, located in present-day Licata, Sicily, Italy.
  - A 1,600-year-old Roman-era burial site, believed to belong to a Germanic warrior and located along the Lippe frontier, includes at least three farmsteads active between the 1st and 3rd centuries CE, featuring wooden-post buildings and evidence of craft activities, including a kiln for non-ferrous metalworking.
- 17
  - A cache of more than 50 primarily German World War I and II helmets along with Polish and Soviet examples was unearthed during roadworks on Koszarowa Street near Wrocław’s University of Archaeology, Poland.
  - A 10th-century Viking burial site with around 30 graves and rich artefacts discovered near Lisbjerg, Denmark, is believed to belong to a noble family linked to the court of King Harald Bluetooth.
- 21 – A British archaeological team from the University of Manchester uncovered remains of the ancient city of Imet at Tell Nebesha in Egypt's Sharqia Governorate, revealing 4th-century BCE residential structures, a processional way linked to the Temple of Wadjet, and Late Period artifacts including a faience ushabti, a bronze sistrum with Hathor's head, and a Horus stela.
- 30 – An Egyptian archaeological team uncovered three rock-cut tombs at Qubbet el-Hawa in Aswan, dating to the late Old Kingdom, with artifacts including fragments of a funerary mask, a small metal amulet depicting the god Khnum, and Late Period pottery vessels.

=== July ===
- 2 – A pre-Hispanic mortuary cave containing the bundled remains of 17 individuals was discovered in the desert mountains of Coahuila, Mexico.
- 6 – Discovery of a 3,500-year-old city in Peru's northern Barranca province, named Peñico, by archaeologists was announced.
- 14 – 1,700-year-old Roman bathing complex was discovered in the village of Salkaya, Elazığ Province, Turkey.
- 16 – A 3,800-year-old Middle Bronze Age kurgan, believed to be the burial site of a warrior was discovered in the Ceyranchol plain, near the village of Yovshanlidere, Azerbaijan.
- 17 – A castle complex over 50 rooms extending approximately 4 km featuring massive stone walls, towers, and gates dating to the first millennium BCE was discovered on the Tirişin Plateau in Hakkari Province, Yüksekova district, Turkey.
- 21 – Discovery of the wreck of British Royal Navy light cruiser HMS Nottingham (1913), torpedoed in the North Sea during the Action of 19 August 1916, was announced.
- 30 – Foundations of a Bronze Age settlement built from river stones, alongside fragments of domestic pottery of various shapes and sizes, miniature household items, and bone spindle whorls was revealed in the village of Kechelekeran, Azerbaijan.

=== August ===
- 1 – Two 1000-year-old Pre-Columbian Inca graves accompanied by four clay vessels and three pumpkin-shell artifacts were found in Lima, Peru.
- 4 – An Aramaic inscription found in the Cave of the Swords near Ein Gedi, Israel, possibly inked by Jewish rebels during the Bar Kokhba revolt in the 2nd century CE, was announced.
- 7 – The largest known cache of bipyramidal iron ingots in Europe, dating from the 1st-2nd century BC in a river in northern Bosnia.
- 8 – A rare Migration Period brooch dating to the 5th–6th century AD was discovered in Kemi, Lapland.
- 14 – A well-preserved Roman thermal bath complex a Roman sauna (laconicum), submerged in the ruins of Baiae, Italy, was announced.
- 19 – Data from Gypsum Overlook, an 8800 year old site in the Tularosa Basin of New Mexico which currently has the oldest dated structures in the American Southwest, was announced.
- 25 – A well-preserved Roman mausoleum with an interior diameter of 15 meters dating to around 50 AD was discovered at Saint-Romain-en-Gal near Lyon, France.
- 26 – A prehistoric burial ground dating back to the Middle Iron Age (around 500–250 BC) was discovered in Heerde, Netherlands.
- 27 – The largest known Bronze Age hoard also ranked as the second-largest Bronze Age hoard found across Saxony was announced in the Upper Lusatia region of eastern Germany.
- 28
  - A silver jital coin, produced in the 8th–9th centuries AD in modern-day Afghanistan, Pakistan, and northern India was discovered at the Gnezdilovo burial ground near Suzdal, Vladimir region, Russia.
  - A funnel-shaped bronze axe was discovered near Paau Village in northern Kalimantan, Borneo.
- 31 – Around 40 tombs dating back more than 2,300 years during the Hellenistic-Seleucid period were unearthed near the Mosul Dam in Duhok Governorate, Iraq, after drought lowered water levels.
- August – Two pots containing between 10,000 and 15,000 Roman coins were found by metal detectorists in Wales, probably the largest such find in the country ever.

=== September ===
- 8 – A hoard of 121 gold artifacts discovered near Cluj County, Romania, dating to approximately 1400–1200 BCE, including a spiral gold ring with no known parallels in the Romanian archaeological record and numerous ornaments interpreted as jewelry.
- 11 – Discovery of a previously unknown complete copy of the Canopus Decree dating to 238 BCE was announced in Sharqia Governorate, Egypt.
- 19 – A Polish metal detecting group searching for WWII rocket parts accidentally unearthed a 1,800-year-old Roman gold necklace and hundreds of medieval silver coins.

=== October ===
- 6 – Roman-period wooden writing tablets in waterlogged wells in the ancient town of Isarnodurum (modern Izernore) was discovered in France.
- 14 – A 1,500-year-old Byzantine era mosaic floor with an inscription reading “Tittos Domestikos” was discovered in Mardin Province, Turkey.
- 15 – A team of archeologists from the University of Coimbra uncovered an unusual Uruk-style settlement at Kani Shaie in northeast Iraq which may have served as a cultic temple. Among the discoveries were an administrative cylinder seal from the Uruk period, wall cones, and a fragment of a gold pendant.
- 16
  - Discovery of a previously unknown city, named Paso Temprano (known locally as “Corral de Piedra”) located on the Pacific-coast region of Guerrero’s Costa Chica in Mexico was announced.
  - Conservation work by National Museums Scotland uncovered silver-coloured objects of the Peebles Hoard, which was discovered in 2020 near Peebles, Scotland. The hoard, dated to approximately 1000–800 BCE, consists of more than 500 objects, including bronze artefacts and rare surviving organic materials such as wood and leather.

=== November ===
- 20 – Archaeologists from Sorbonne University uncovered 225 royal ushabti figurines belonging to Shoshenq III of the 22nd Dynasty at Tanis in Egypt's Nile Delta, found in a tomb's northern chamber near a previously unidentified sarcophagus.
- 26
  - A 5,000-year-old tomb attributed to the Begazy–Dandibay culture with a well-preserved burial chamber and human remains was discovered in Karaganda region, Kazakhstan.
  - Discovery of two carved human-face reliefs at the Neolithic site Sefertepe in Turkey was announced.
- 27 – Discovery of an Archaic-Era tomb dated to the second half of the seventh century BCE was announced near Lake Kifisida (ancient Kopaida), Greece. The burial includes the so-called the “Lady with the Inverted Diadem” that appears to belong to a young noblewoman, and has been described as an elite grave due to the luxury of the grave goods and the rich funerary assemblage.
- 30 – Discovery of a 1300-year-old warrior tomb with grave goods, believed to belong to a high-status warrior of the Pannonian Avars was announced near Székesfehérvár in Hungary. The burial is dated to approximately 670–690 CE, placing it within the Middle Avar period.

=== December ===
- 2 – Discovery of a group of 500 BC iron lances was announced near the village of Boeslunde on Zealand, Denmark.
- 3 – Discovery of an ornately carved Roman-era funerary stele made of limestone was announced in Muğla's Seydikemer district, Turkey.
- 5 – Archaeologists discovered a 2nd century AD Roman-era cameo depicting Medusa in Hallstatt, Austria.
- 8
  - Discovery of the wreck of a thalamegos, an Egyptian pleasure barge, from the early 1st century CE in the harbor of Alexandria was announced.
  - Archaeologists in northeastern France announced the discovery of several buried ceramic jars in ancient Senon, containing tens of thousands of Roman coins dating to the late 3rd–early 4th century CE.
- 11 – French marine archaeologists announced the discovery of a massive undersea stone wall off the coast of Île de Sein, Brittany, dating to around 5000 BC, believed to have been built by a Stone Age society.
- 12
  - Discovery of a 16th-century gallows and multiple burial remains during excavation work was announced in Grenoble, southeastern France.
  - An Italian archaeological mission announced the discovery of architectural remains associated with the Valley Temple of Fifth Dynasty pharaoh Nyuserre Ini at Abu Ghurab, near Cairo, dating to the Old Kingdom.
- 13 – Discovery of a Polish military eagle standard belonged to the 12th Light Artillery Regiment (also known as the 12th Mechanised Division) in the forests near Starachowice was announced in southeastern Poland.
- 21
  - Bronze sitella vessel with Roman inscription was discovered at the Molinete Archaeological Park in Cartagena, Spain.
  - Stone Age rock paintings depicting fish and a boat were revealed in Møre og Romsdal county, Norway.
- 23
  - More than 400 19th-century leather boots and shoes had washed up on beaches in south Wales.
  - Discovery of a 2,000-year-old circular stone labyrinth was announced in Maharashtra, India.
- 24 – Flail-type weapon dating to the early 15th century was found in the Warmian-Masurian Voivodeship, Poland.
- 29 – A multicolored Roman-era enamelled bronze fibula (brooch) near Grudziądz, Poland.
- 30
  - Discovery of industrial workshops dating to Egypt's Late Period and early Ptolemaic era was announced by a joint Egyptian–Italian archaeological mission led by the Supreme Council of Antiquities and the University of Padua, along with Roman-era burial remains at the Kom al-Ahmar and Kom Wasit sites in the Western Nile Delta.
  - Second Temple–period ritual bath (mikveh) beneath the Western Wall Plaza under a dense layer of destruction from 70 AD.

== Events ==
=== January ===
- 25 – The Helmet of Coțofenești and three golden royal bracelets from the Dacia - Empire of Gold and silver exhibit were stolen from the Drents Museum.

=== March ===
- 1 – Restoration of the ancient Western Theater at Laodicea on the Lycus, in Denizli province, Turkey, was completed.

=== April ===
- 3 – Saved Treasures of Gaza: 5000 Years of History, an exhibition of artefacts found during excavations in the Gaza Strip, opens at the Institut du Monde Arabe in Paris.

=== May ===
- 26 to 30 – "45th International Symposium of Excavations, Survey and Archaeometry" was held at the Prof. Dr. Uğur Oral Cultural Center on Mersin University's Çiftlikköy Campus.
- 27 – A 1,600-year-old Byzantine mosaic known as the Be’er Shema (Birsama) mosaic from a Christian monastery near Kibbutz Urim in southern Israel was unveiled to the public for the first time.

=== June ===
- 9 to 11 – “Poles on the Nile” conference, University of Warsaw.
- 18 to 19 – Rome and Barbarians conference, University of Warsaw.
- 22 to 28 – Darwin: 10th World Archaeological Congress.
- 25 to 27 – "Women’s Perspectives in the Nile Valley" conference, University of Warsaw.

=== August ===
- 7 to 10 – near Blanding, Utah, 2025 Pecos conference.

=== September ===
- 3 to 6 – Belgrade: 31st Annual Meeting of the European Association of Archaeologists.
- 18 – The Egyptian Ministry of the Interior reports that a 3,000-year-old gold bracelet belonging to the ancient pharaoh Amenemope, which disappeared from the Egyptian museum in Cairo, was stolen, melted down and sold, and several suspects were arrested.

=== October ===
- 24 to 26 – Ankara, 3rd International Congress of Anthropological Sciences.

=== November ===
- 9 – Egyptian archaeologist Zahi Hawass announced at the 44th Sharjah International Book Fair that a previously unknown structure inside the Pyramid of Khufu will be revealed to the world in 2026. This discovery was made using advanced scanning technologies and involves a 30-metre void with a sealed door deep within the pyramid.

=== December ===
- 14 – Restoration of a colossal statue of Pharaoh Amenhotep III, located near the Colossi of Memnon at his funerary temple in Luxor, was completed after decades of archaeological reconstruction.

== See also ==
- List of years in archaeology
- 2025 in bioarchaeology
