= 2025 in bioarchaeology =

This page lists significant events in 2025 in bioarchaeology.

== Finds ==
=== February ===
- 18 – A study of Viking Age skulls from Sweden revealed widespread signs of disease and health problems as sinus and ear infections, osteoarthritis among individuals who lived between approximately 20 and 60 years of age.
- 20 – Well-preserved remains of a bog body recovered from peatland deposits are likely to be a 17- to 22-year-old female in County Londonderry, Northern Ireland.

=== May ===
- 27 – A 2,000-year-old double burial of fraternal twins in Roman-era Croatia may have been influenced by lead poisoning, as indicated by signs of metabolic diseases like scurvy and rickets in their remains, suggesting maternal malnutrition or environmental lead exposure during pregnancy.

=== June ===
- 2 – Genetic analysis of early medieval Polish remains, including possible Piast dynasty members, indicates that Poland's first rulers might had mixed ancestry with links to northern Germany, Denmark, and the Baltics, challenging the idea of a purely Slavic origin.
- 5 – A 6,200-year-old skull of a teenage girl which shows evidence of intentional cranial deformation and a fatal perimortem skull fracture was discovered at the Chega Sofla site in Iran.
- 12 – Recent analysis of 2-million-year-old fossilized teeth from early human ancestors reveals uniform, circular, and shallow pits in the enamel, suggesting these features are genetically inherited rather than caused by disease or environmental stress, potentially serving as evolutionary markers for identifying specific hominin lineages.

=== July ===
- 2 – Remains of 17 individuals including men, women, and children, who were interred in bundled form on baskets or mats in a pre-Hispanic mortuary cave were discovered in the desert mountains of Coahuila, Mexico.
- 17 – A 3,800-year-old Middle Bronze Age kurgan along with several grave goods, believed to be the burial site of a warrior was discovered in the Ceyranchol plain, near the village of Yovshanlidere, Azerbaijan.

=== August ===
- 1 – A 1000-year-old Pre-Columbian Inca grave with the remains of an individual accompanied by four clay vessels and three pumpkin-shell artifacts were found in Lima, Peru.
- 28 – Three prehistoric Maya children's teeth (aged approximately 8–10 years) were found to feature jade inlays, a dental modification previously documented only in adolescents and adults.
- 30 – A mortuary structure referred to as the "House of the Dead" or "Spiritual House" with the remains of 20 individuals were discovered at Çatalhöyük, Turkey.

=== November ===
- 6 – Confirmation of the tomb of Saint Hilarion and with 62 bone fragments belonging to an elderly male at the site of his monastery in the Suzdal Kremlin.
- 27 – Discovery of an Archaic-Era tomb dated to the second half of the sevenh century BCE was announced near Lake Kifisida (ancient Kopaida), Greece. The site includes the burial of the so-called the “Lady with the Inverted Diadem” that appears to belong to a young noblewoman, and has been described as an elite grave due to the luxury of the grave goods and the rich funerary assemblage.
- 30 – Discovery of a 1300-year-old warrior tomb with grave goods, believed to belong to a high-status warrior of the Pannonian Avars was announced near Székesfehérvár in Hungary. The burial is dated to approximately 670–690 CE, placing it within the Middle Avar period.

=== December ===
12 – Discovery of multiple burial pits containing the skeletal remains of at least 30 individuals, predominantly adult males during excavation work was announced in Grenoble, southeastern France.

28 – Grave evidence discovered near Duczów Mały, Poland, and linked to actions by the Red Army included the remains of a woman whose skeleton showed evidence of fatal trauma to the skull.

== Events ==
=== August ===
- 27 – France returned three colonial-era human skulls to Madagascar, one of which is believed to belong to King Toera, a monarch of the Sakalava people who was beheaded by French troops in 1897 during a colonial campaign.

== See also ==
- 2025 in archaeology
