= Saloğlu =

Saloghlu
- Municipality
- Azerbaijani: Saloğlu
- Location within Azerbaijan
- Coordinates: 41°16′25″N 45°21′20″E
- Country: Azerbaijan
- District: Aghstafa

Population (2008)
  - Total: 1,581
- Time zone: UTC+4 (AZT)
  - Summer (DST): UTC+5 (AZT)

Saloğlu (also, Saloghlu) is a village and municipality in the Aghstafa District of Azerbaijan. It has a population of 1,581. The municipality consists of the villages of Saloghlu and Jeyranchol.
