= Harvester Vase =

Minoan carved stone vase of c. 1550 BC

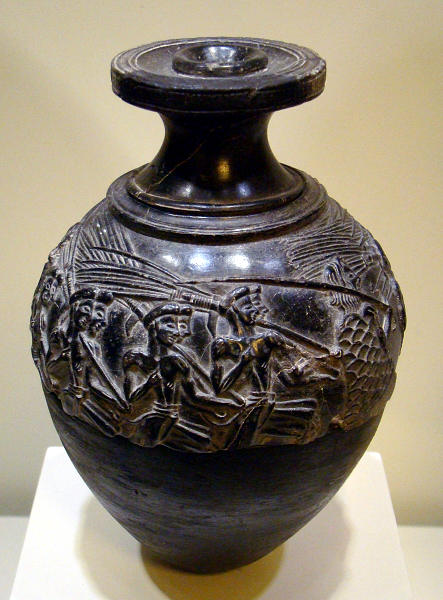
- Material: Black steatite
- Size: 4.5 inches (11 centimetres) (diameter)
- Created: c. 1550–1500 BC
- Period/culture: Neopalatial
- Discovered: Hagia Triada
- Present location: Heraklion Archaeological Museum
- Identification: AE 184
- Culture: Minoan

The Harvester Vase is a Late Bronze Age stone rhyton, dating to about 1550 to 1500 BC, found at Hagia Triada, an ancient "palace" of the Minoan civilization in Crete. It is now in the Heraklion Archaeological Museum, and is an important example of Minoan art from the Neopalatial Period.

The vase was made in three parts, of which the lowest is missing and has been replaced in modern times with undecorated plaster. A band of relief running around the widest part of the vase depicts marching men, and has variously been interpreted as a harvest celebration, a religious procession, or a military scene.

The scene has been praised for its "impression of vital, rhythmic movement", though exactly what it shows has been much argued about. Two other Minoan stone vases with figural scenes of humans were found at Hagia Triada. The "Chieftain Cup" is probably by the same artist, perhaps working at the nearby palatial site of Knossos. The third is known as the "Boxer Vase".

== Description ==
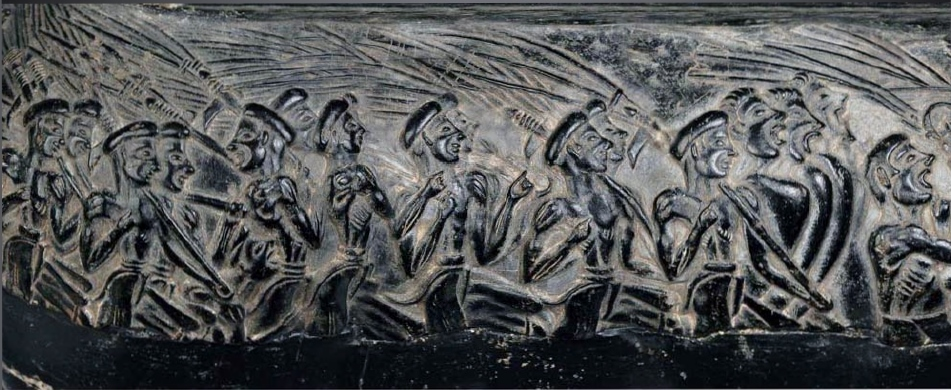
Wide view from a cast in the museum, the singers at right

The rhyton was made during the Neopalatial period of Minoan civilization, around 1550 to 1500 BC. It was found at the "palace" of Hagia Triada in central Crete. It is made from steatite in the form of an ostrich egg; this was a rare and exotic object in the Bronze Age Mediterranean, used to make rhyta. It would have had a second hole at the bottom for ritual drinking or libation, that was stopped with a finger until a flow was required. It was probably originally coated with gold leaf, in whole or part.

The surviving fragments of the neck and shoulder measure approximately 4 inches (10 centimetres) in height, while the diameter of the vase is 4.5 inches (11 centimetres) at its greatest. The vase was made in three parts, of which the lowest is missing and has been replaced in modern times with undecorated plaster.

Around the widest part runs a relief of a procession, perhaps a dance, of 27 men. This is cut off at the level of their legs, but presumably was continued on the missing lowest section. Most of the men are young and dressed in the same way, with short kilts and "flat roll-brimmed caps". Exceptions are an older-looking man with long hair and a coat decorated with a pattern of scales or scallops. He carries a long staff curved at the bottom, and seems to be leading the group. There is also a man with a sistrum, a rattle-like musical instrument, who has his mouth wide open, and may be singing. This is the only known depiction of a sistrum in Minoan art.

Behind him come four men wearing cloaks, who also have their mouths wide open. One figure near the end of the procession appears to have fallen: the archaeologist Sinclair Hood suggests that he may be helping another figure, whom Hood interpreted as perhaps having fallen down through drunkenness.

== Interpretation ==
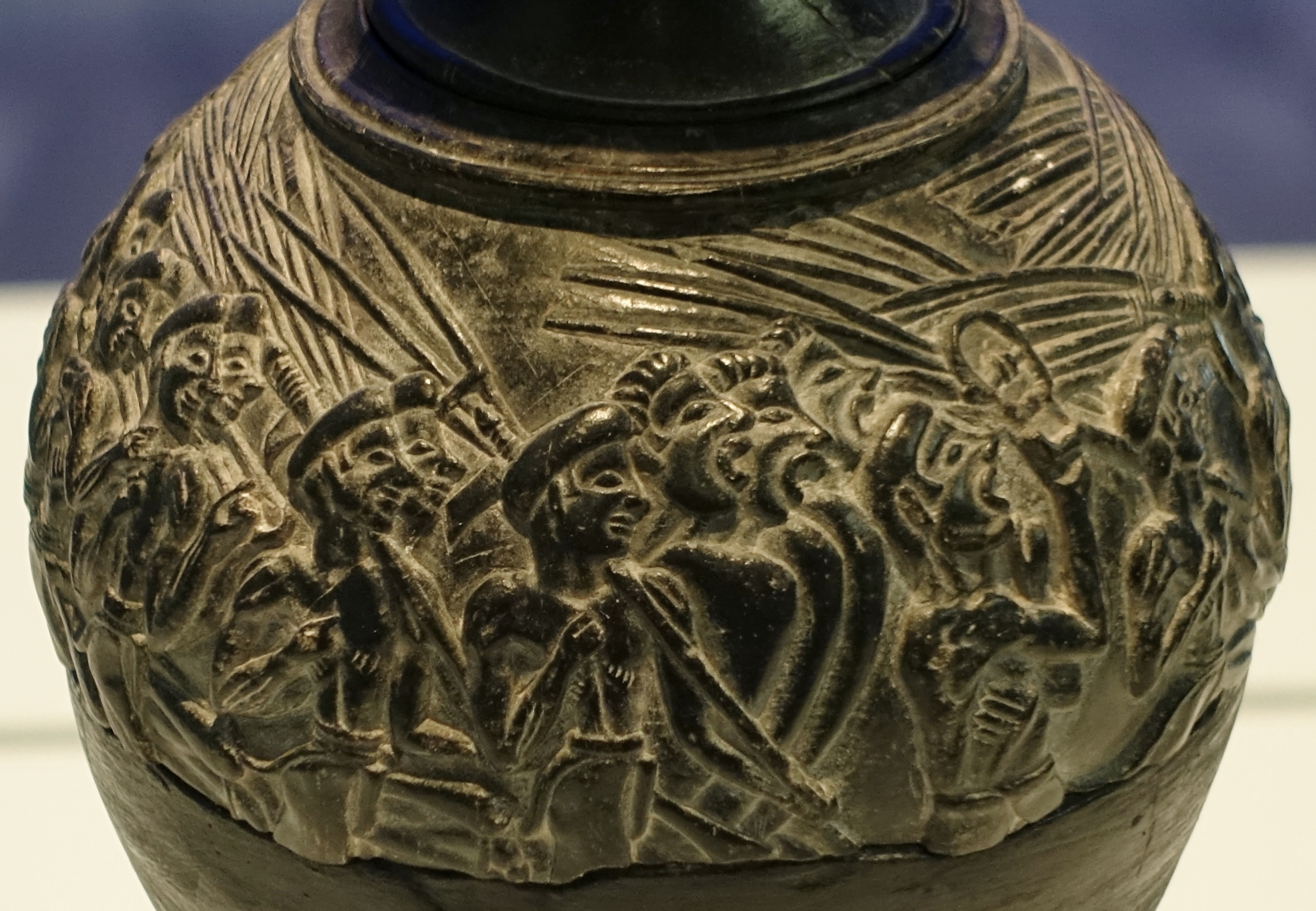
The sistrum player (right) and cloaked singers

Hood praised the vase's artwork for its "impression of vital, rhythmic movement", though exactly what it shows has been much argued about. The vase's discoverers considered the men in depicted upon it to be warriors, but this interpretation has been less popular with later writers.

Hood wrote that the main body of the "rank and file" carry "curious three-pronged poles" over their shoulders and have "bag-like objects" around their knees. This equipment has been much discussed, and is often taken as representing kit for either sowing or harvesting and threshing cereal crops. The scene has also been interpreted as a harvest celebration, probably with a religious element. Dieter Rumpel considers the practicability of the three-pronged implements for the various agricultural tasks proposed for them, and concludes that they would not work. He believes that the implements were stabbing weapons used for naval warfare during close-quarter fighting between boats.

The vase is similar in shape to another vase, found at Zakros in eastern Crete, made from painted clay. Two other Minoan stone vases with figural scenes were found at Hagia Triada. The "Chieftain Cup" is probably by the same artist, perhaps working at the nearby palatial site of Knossos. The third is known as the "Boxer Vase".

== Discovery ==
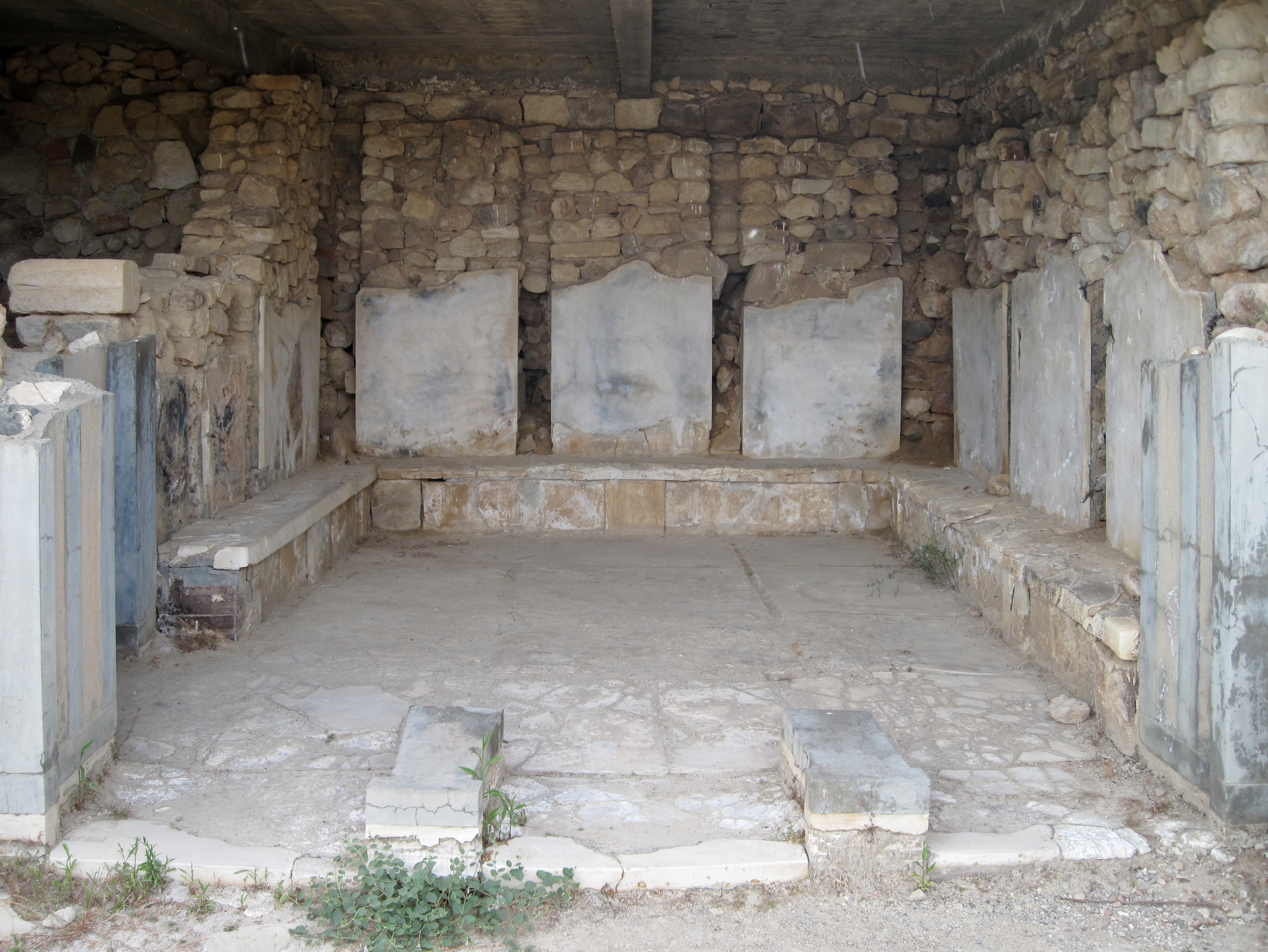
Find-spot of the Harvester Vase at Hagia Triada

The site of Hagia Triada was excavated from 1902 by the Italian School of Archaeology at Athens, under the directorship of the archaeologists Frederico Halbherr and Roberto Paribeni. The Harvester Vase was discovered during experimental excavations in 1902, in the northern part of the palace's west wing, in a room with alabaster covering its walls and floor and with benches along its sides. The room, on the ground floor, originally contained wooden beams which supported a ceiling and a second floor; the vase is believed to have fallen from this second floor when the palace was destroyed.

The vase's discovery was first announced in scholarship by the British archaeologists M. N. Tod and Robert Carr Bosanquet, director of the British School at Athens in the 1901–1902 edition of Archaeology in Greece, an annual report of archaeological discoveries published by the Journal of Hellenic Studies. It was formally published in 1903, in a find report by the Italian archaeologist Luigi Savignoni entitled Il Vaso di Hagia Triada ('The Vase of Hagia Triada').

A replica of the vase, made by the Swiss artist Émile Gilliéron around 1907–1908 and donated by the archaeologist Gisela Richter to the Metropolitan Museum of Art in New York reconstructs the total height at 18.4 cm (7.2 in).

== Gallery ==
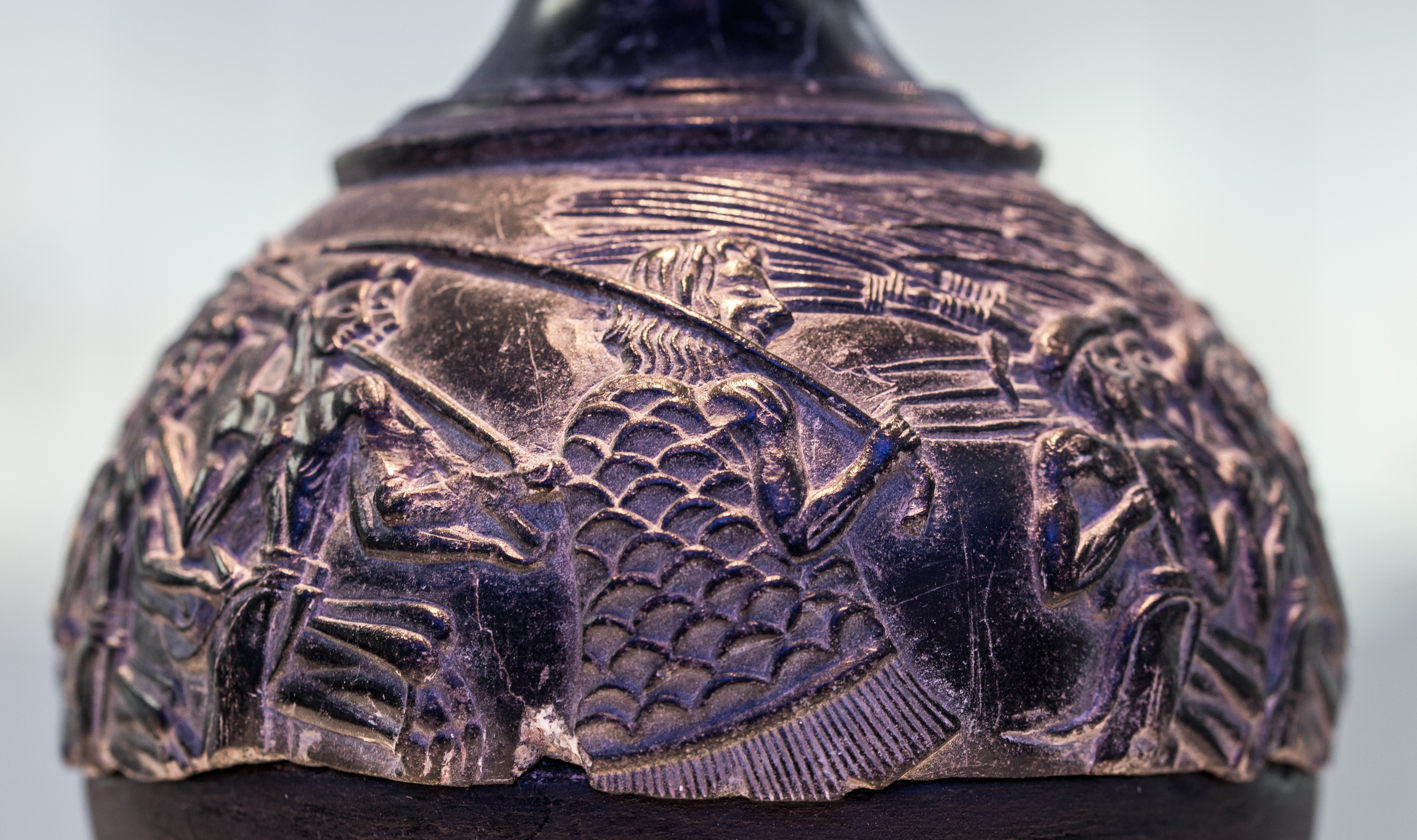
The older "leader"

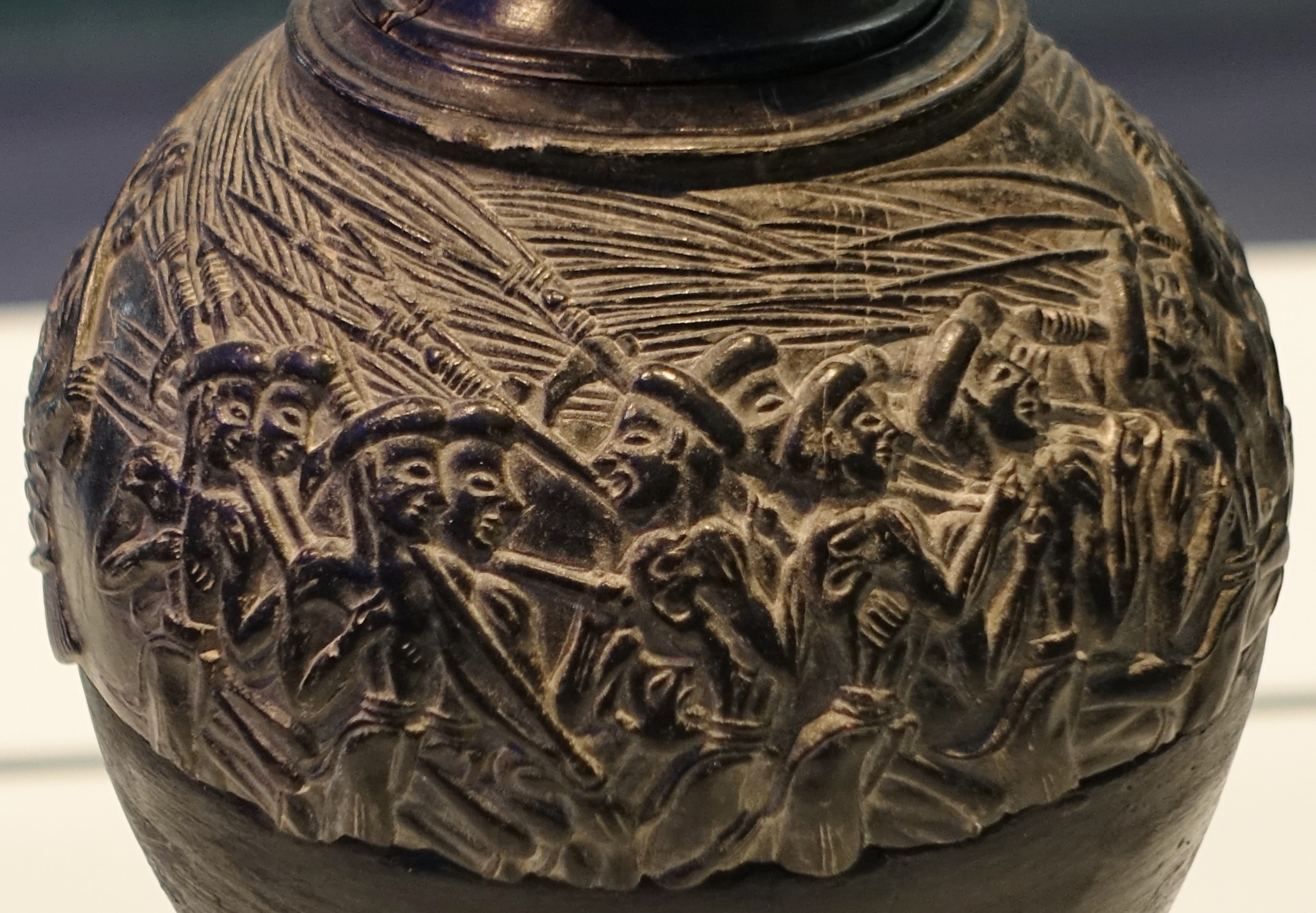
The man turned back, and the fallen man.

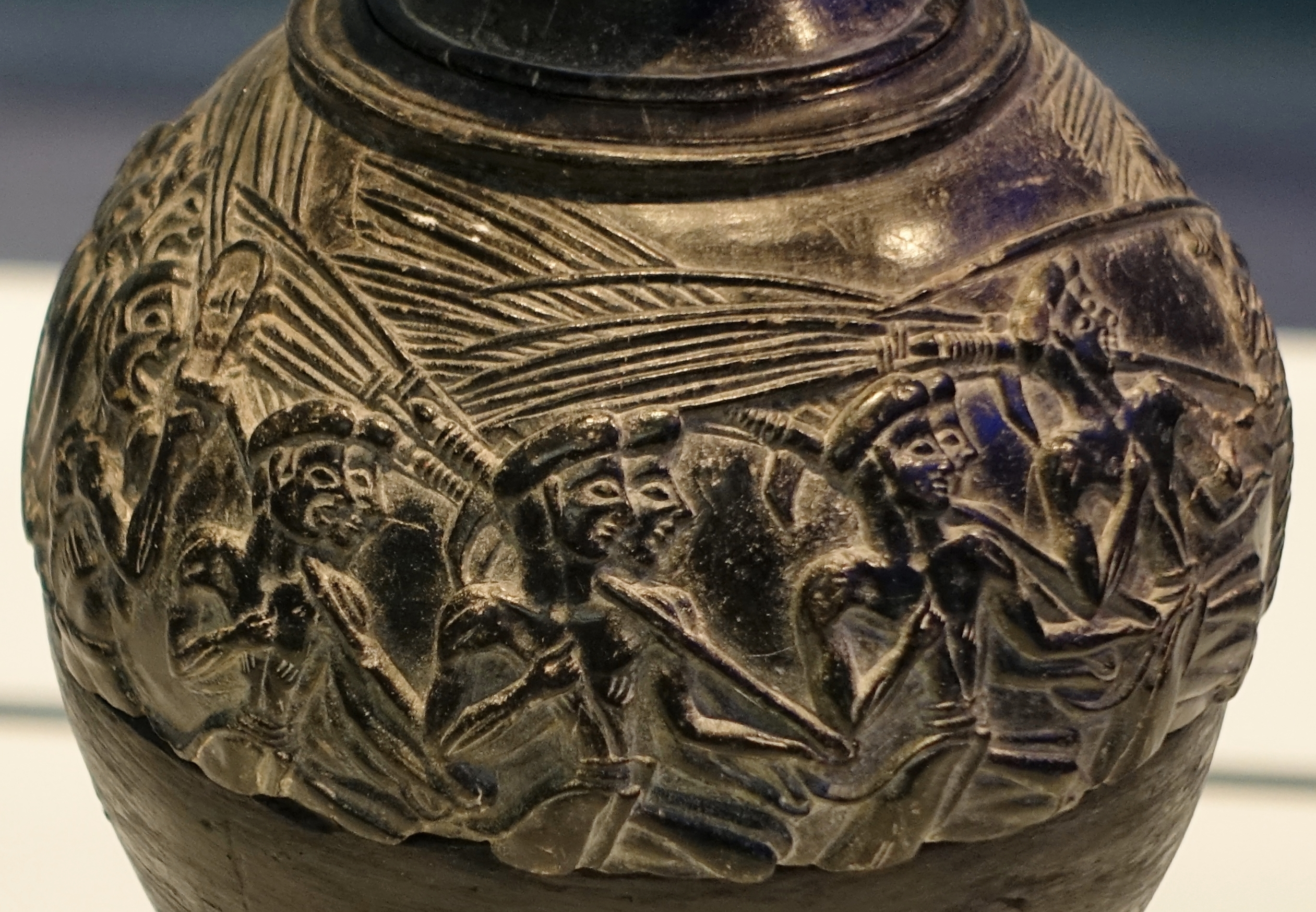
The men in front of the sistrum player

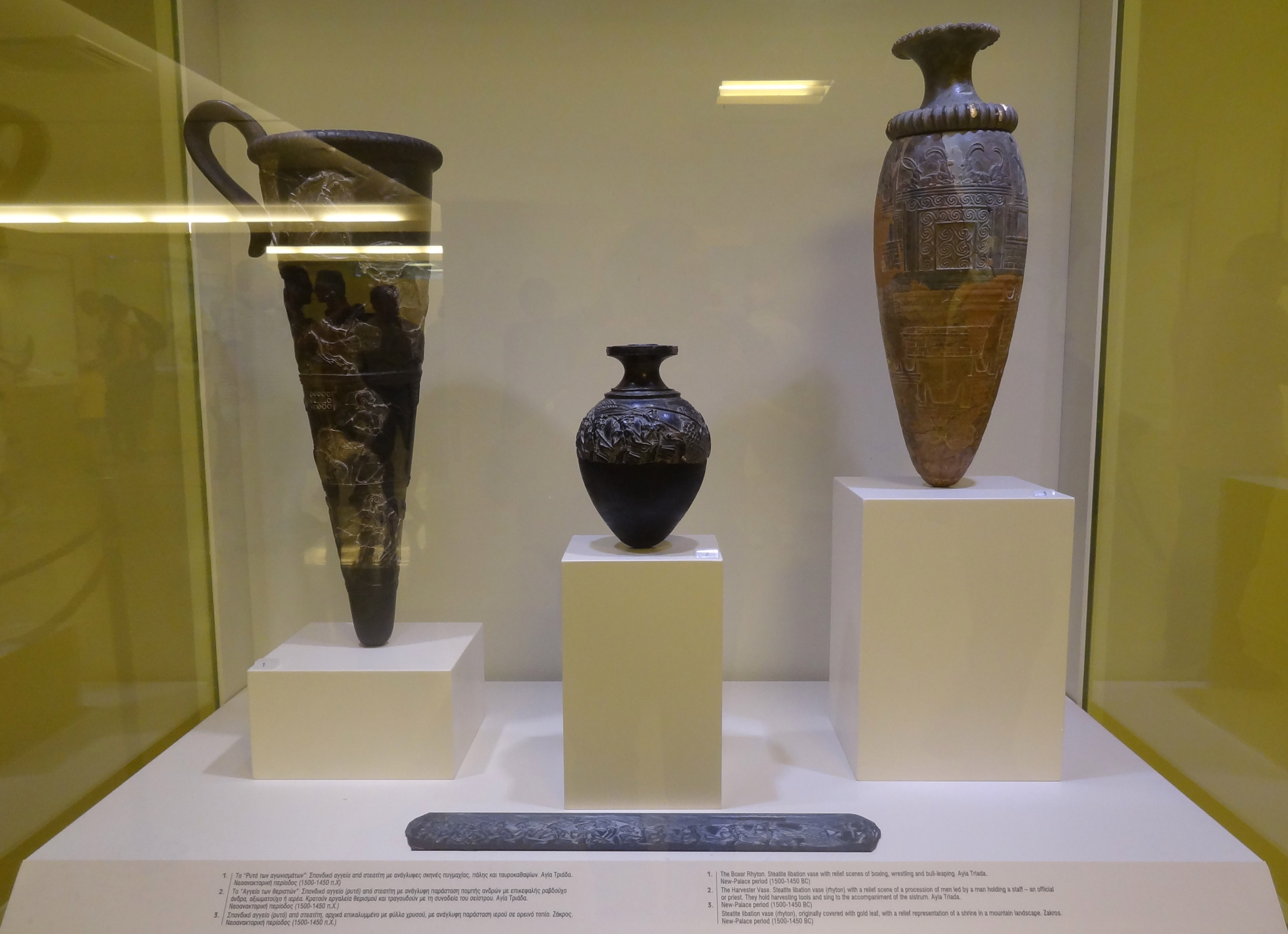
In the museum; at centre, with the "Boxer Vase" at left
