= Senon =

- Commune
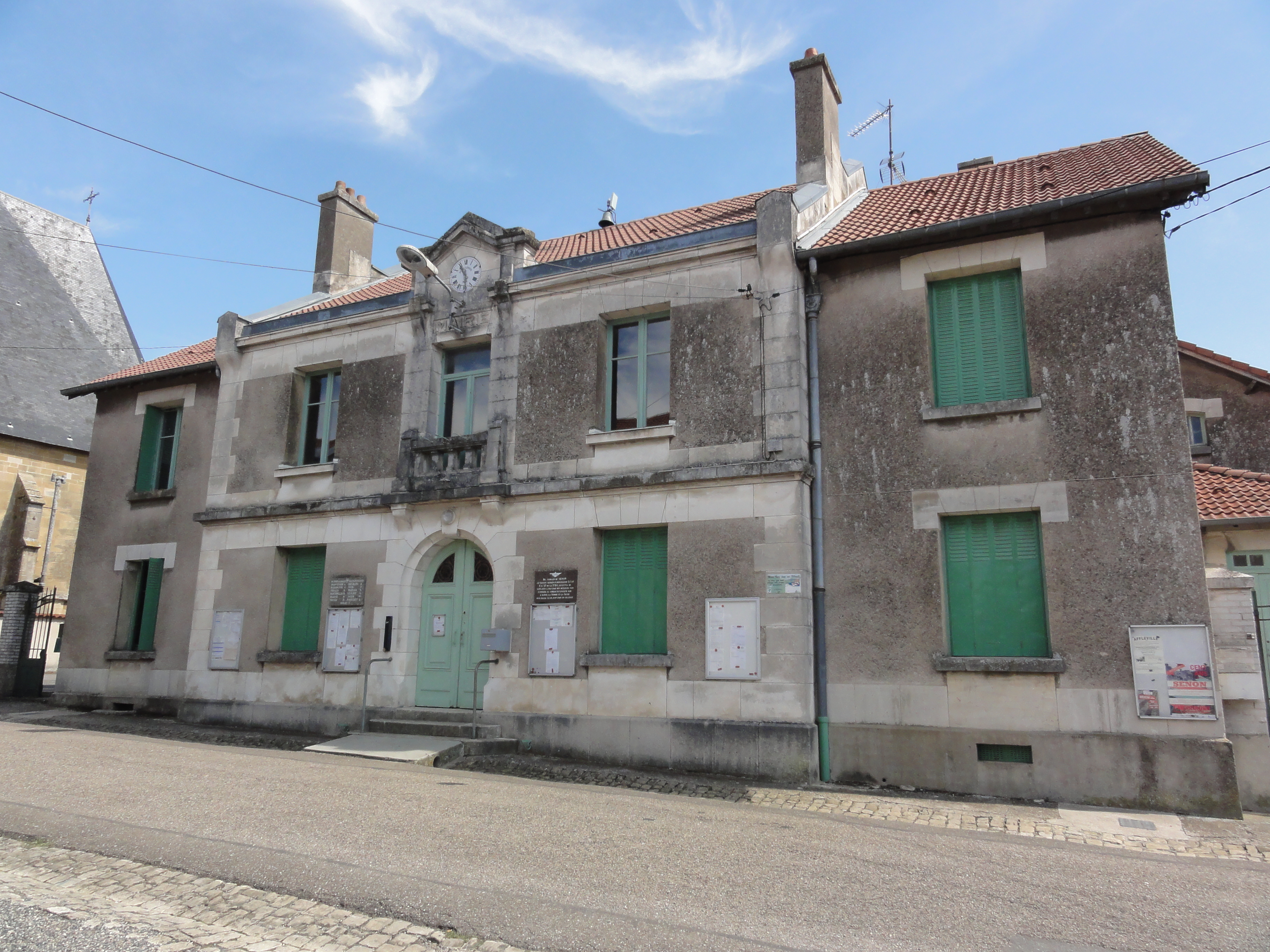
- The town hall in Senon
- Location of Senon
- Location within France Location within Grand Est
- Coordinates: 49°16′50″N 5°38′29″E
- Country: France
- Region: Grand Est
- Department: Meuse
- Arrondissement: Verdun
- Canton: Bouligny
- Intercommunality: CC Damvillers Spincourt

Government
  - Mayor (2020–2026): Jocelyne Antoine
- Area^{1}: 20.5 km^{2} (7.9 sq mi)
- Elevation: 238 m (781 ft)
- Population (2023): 300
  - Density: 15/km^{2} (38/sq mi)
- Time zone: UTC+01:00 (CET)
  - Summer (DST): UTC+02:00 (CEST)
- INSEE/Postal code: 55481 /55230
- ^{1} French Land Register data, which excludes lakes, ponds, glaciers > 1 km^{2} (0.386 sq mi or 247 acres) and river estuaries.

Senon (French pronunciation: [sənɔ̃]) is a commune in the Meuse department in Grand Est in north-eastern France. It is built near an ancient town and archaeological site

== See also ==
- Communes of the Meuse department
