= X'baatún =

Archaeological site and ancient Maya city in Yucatán, Mexico

- Location within Mexico Location within Yucatán (state)
- Type: Ancient Maya city
- Periods: Preclassic - Classic
- Cultures: Maya civilization
- Location: Mexico
- Region: Yucatán

History
- Built: 300 BC - 1000 AD
- Abandoned: 1000 AD

Site notes
- Architectural style: Megalithic

X'baatún is an archaeological site and ancient Maya city built around a jungle lagoon of the state of Yucatán in Mexico, its initial settlement began around 300 BC during the Preclassic period of the Maya civilization and its development extended until the end of the late Classic period between 800 and 1000 AD. The site is near the Maya city of Izamal and includes large megalithic style ceremonial and residential buildings with walled structures.

== Location ==
X'baatún is located between lagoons and a cenote in the jungle of eastern Yucatán in the municipality of Tekal de Venegas inside the Oxwatz natural park, about 70 km from the city of Mérida and 10 km of the Maya site of Izamal.

== Architecture ==
The archaeological site of X'baatún is conformed by numerous megalithic style buildings, one of the main structures is a pyramid of up to 15 meters high and 50 meters wide, there have also been identified temples, palaces, ceremonial structures, large residential platforms and a ball court. The archaeological research works have identified buildings with features and architectural elements similar to the structures of the near Maya city of Izamal and its characteristic architectural style known as megalithic, this could show that X'baatún was under the influence of Izamal, Puuc style elements have also been identified in the columns of a large residential palace complex that is believed to have belonged to a ruler of the site. In a complex of the site, many ritual structures have been found, including a ceremonial platform on top of a chultun with access to water, which according with the ancient Maya mythology had great significance. In 2025, the Instituto Nacional de Antropología e Historia reported on the results of a mapping project that uncovered the lay-out of X'baatún`s core area.
