= Tekal de Venegas Municipality =

Municipality in the Mexican state of Yucatán

Tekal de Venegas
- Municipality
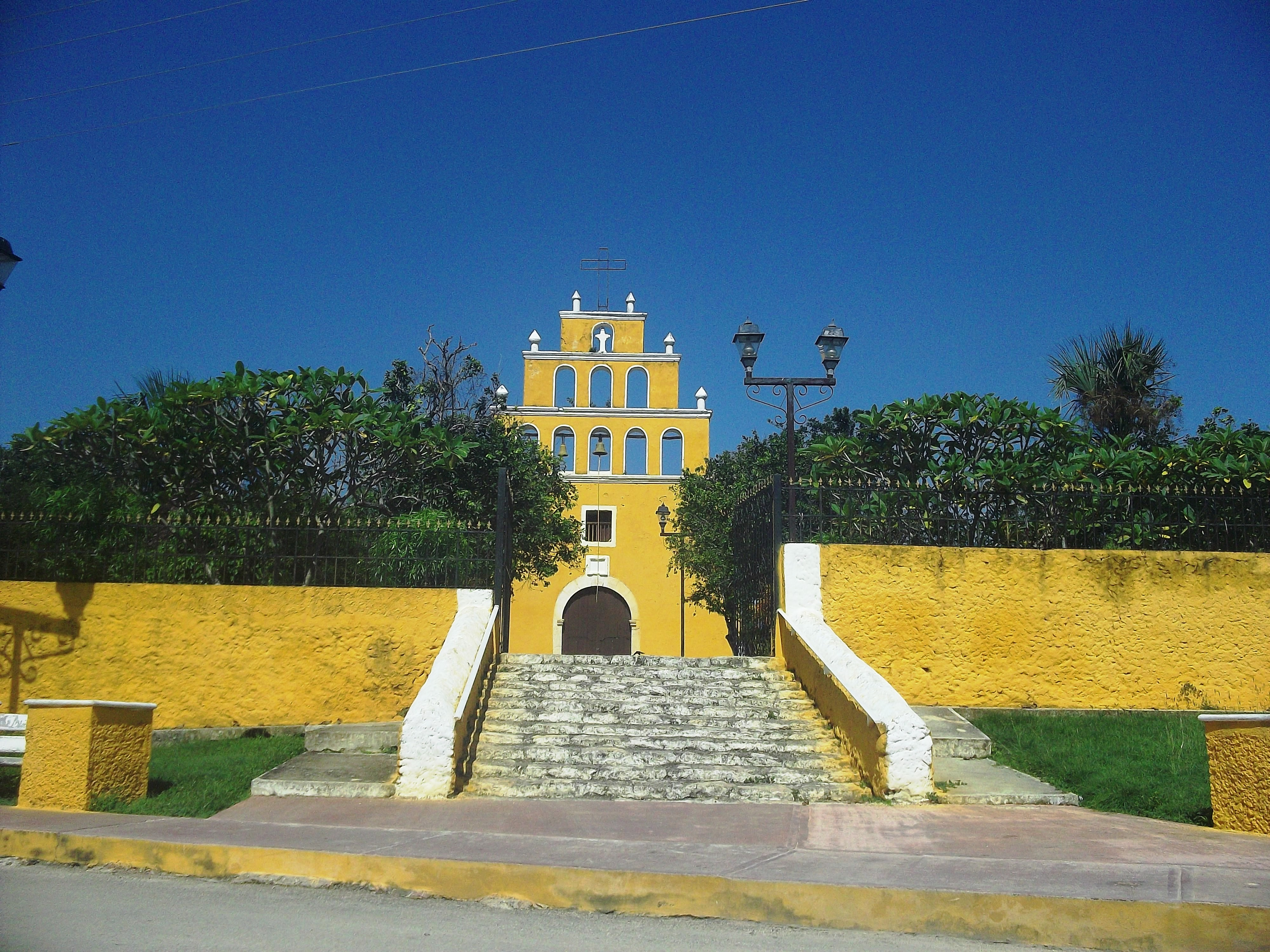
- Principal Church of Tekal de Venegas, Yucatán

- Region 3 Centro #077

- Location of the Municipality in Mexico
- Coordinates: 21°00′45″N 88°56′52″W
- Country: Mexico
- State: Yucatán

Government
  - Type: 2012–2015
  - Municipal President: José Antonio Aragón Uicab

Area
  - Total: 95.80 km^{2} (36.99 sq mi)
- Elevation: 10 m (33 ft)

Population (2010)
  - Total: 2,606
- Time zone: UTC-6 (Central Standard Time)
- INEGI Code: 009
- Major Airport: Merida (Manuel Crescencio Rejón) International Airport
- IATA Code: MID
- ICAO Code: MMMD

Tekal de Venegas Municipality (In the Yucatec Maya Language: “place of imprisonment” combined with the surname of a Spanish soldier who kept the city from destruction during the Caste War of Yucatán) is a municipality in the Mexican state of Yucatán containing 95.80 km^{2} of land and located roughly 80 km east of the city of Mérida.

== History ==
During pre-Hispanic times, the area was part of the chieftainship of Ah-Kin-Chel. After the conquest the area became part of the encomienda system with Diego Brizeño as the encomendero in 1576. Subsequent holders of the trusteeship were María de Mena y Ontivero, who in 1698 had charge of 208 Indians and García Rejón, who was in charge of 965 Indians in 1756.

Yucatán declared its independence from the Spanish Crown in 1821 and in 1825, the area was assigned to the Coast region with its headquarters in the Izamal Municipality. In 1930, it became part of the Temax Municipality, before becoming head of its own municipality.

== Governance ==
The municipal president is elected for a three year term. The town council has four councilpersons, who serve as Secretary and councilors of Public works, sports, ecology and public monuments.

The Municipal Council administers the business of the municipality. It is responsible for budgeting and expenditures and producing all required reports for all branches of the municipal administration. Annually it determines educational standards for schools.

The Police Commissioners ensure public order and safety. They are tasked with enforcing regulations, distributing materials and administering rulings of general compliance issued by the council.

== Communities ==
The head of the municipality is Tekal de Venegas, Yucatán. The other populated areas are El Ancla, Chahchac, Kuncheilá, Monil, Oxozua, San Felipe, Hacienda Santa Cruz, Thohobkú, Tixcancal, and Xpichi. The significant populations are shown below:

| Community | Population |
|---|---|
| Entire Municipality (2010) | 2,606 |
| San Felipe | 30 in 2005 |
| Tekal de Venegas | 2420 in 2005 |

== Local festivals ==
Every year from 28 to 31 January is held a celebration in honor of the Virgin of Candelaria and from 15 to 19 April a festival honors Saint Peter.

== Tourist attractions ==
- Church of San Román
- Church of Saint Peter
- Hacienda Tohopkú
