= Sistrum =

Musical instrument

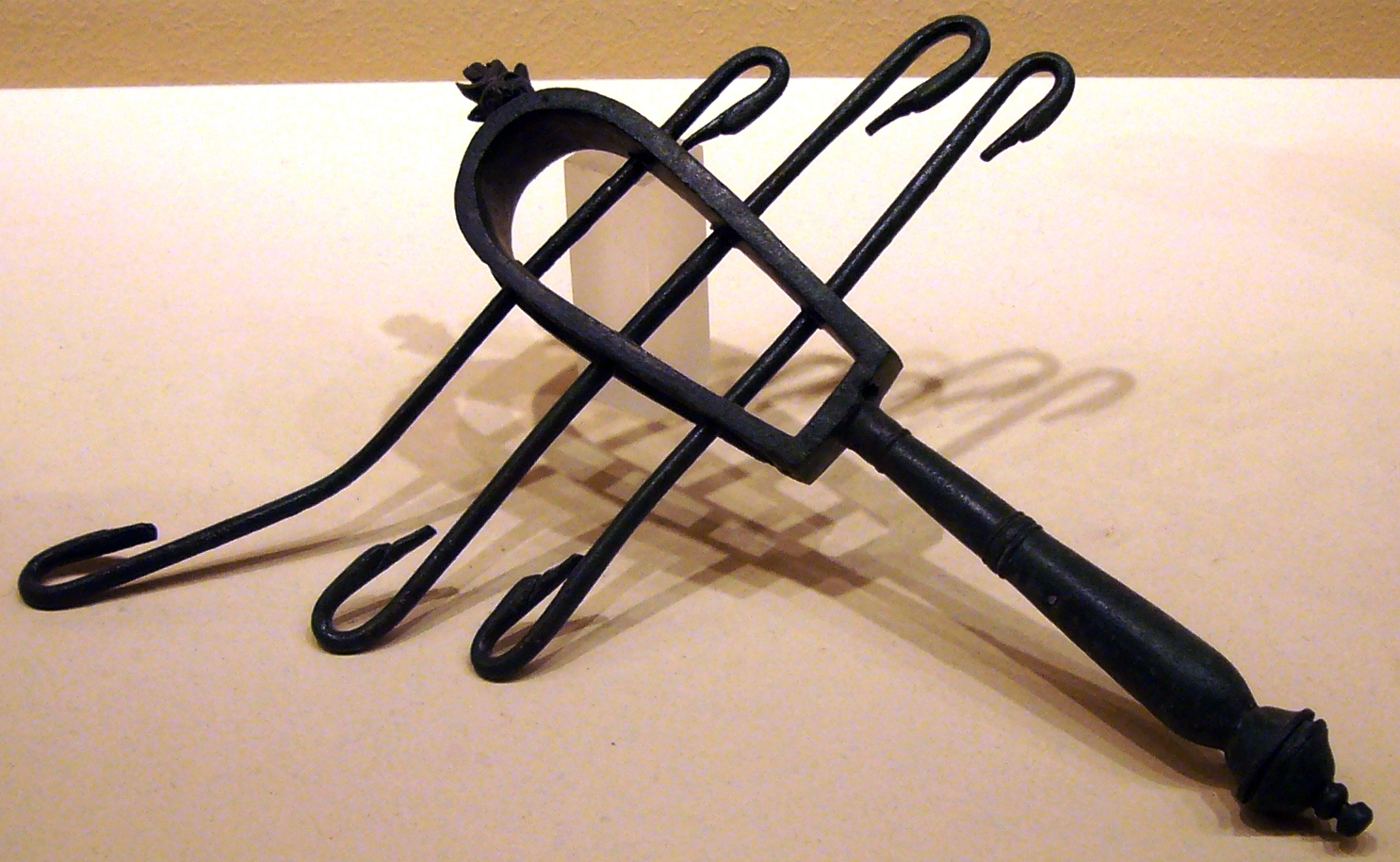
A sekhem-style sistrum

Y8
Sistrum
in hieroglyphs

A sistrum (plural: sistra; from Latin sistrum, from Greek σεῖστρον seistron of the same meaning; literally "that which is being shaken", from σείειν seiein, "to shake") is a musical instrument of the percussion family, a form of rattle, used most notably by the ancient Egyptians. It consists of a handle and a U-shaped metal frame, made of brass or bronze and ranging from 30 to 76 cm (12–30 in) in width. The frame supports sliding metal cross-bars, which may hold metal rings. When shaken, the small rings or loops of thin metal on its movable crossbars produce a sound that can vary from a soft clank to a loud jangling. Its name in the ancient Egyptian language was sekhem (sḫm) or sesheshet (sššt) because of the sound it made when it rattled. (Note: "In the ancient Egyptian language this instrument's name was sesheshet (sššt), an onomatopoeic word derived from the sounds of the instrument — that is, a soft jangling sound that resembles a breeze rustling/blowing through papyrus.") The ancient Egyptian sistrum had important associations with religious and ritualistic practices concerning various musical and joyful deities.

A sekhem is the simpler, hoop-like sistrum, while a sesheshet (an onomatopoeic word) is the naos-shaped one.

The English language has adopted the name sistrum to refer to modern-day West African disc-rattle instruments.

== Egyptian sistrum ==
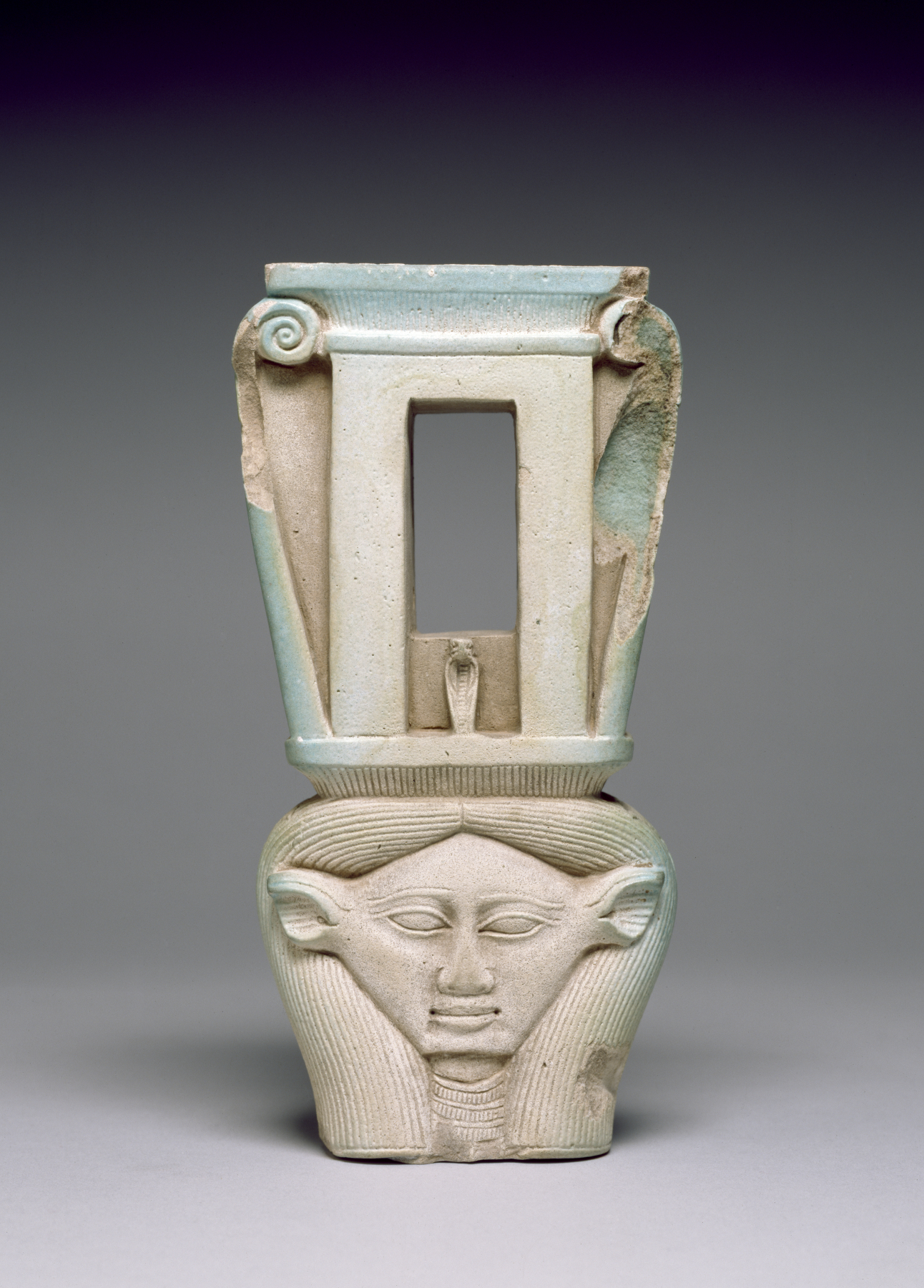
A sesheshet-type sistrum, shaped like a naos, Twenty-sixth Dynasty (ca. 580–525 BCE)

The sistrum was a sacred instrument in ancient Egypt. Perhaps originating in the worship of the goddess Bat, it was used in dances and religious ceremonies, particularly in the worship of the goddess Hathor, with the U-shape of the sistrum's handle and frame seen as resembling the face and horns of the cow goddess. Another type of sistrum used during the worship of Hathor is naos-shaped: a small temple with an elaboratly adorned handle with the head of Hathor on top of it. The sistrum was exclusively carried by women or musical priestesses for ritualistic practices, except for festivals when the king would use the sistrum in order to present something to Hathor. The sounds made by the percussive instrument along with the rhythm of the music was largely important for calling upon deities, the repetitive sound thought to aid in ritual healing and alter reality. The sistrum was also used outside of religious contexts for other types of music, dancing, and merrymaking until the 18th dynasty, when the use of the sistrum became increasingly more restricted, until it was only used for religious purposes. It also was shaken to avert the flooding of the Nile and to frighten away Set.

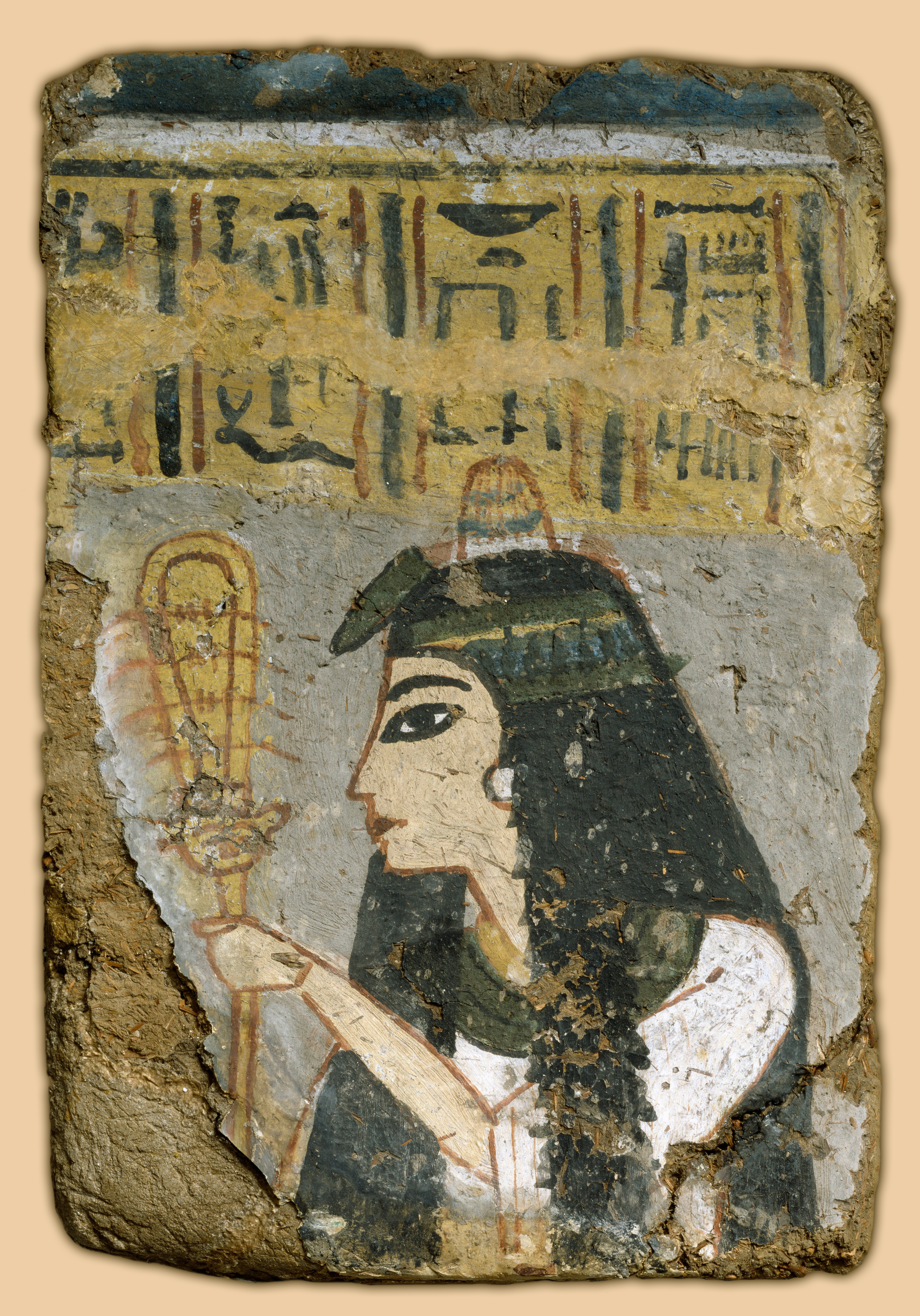
Ancient Relief of Woman Holding a Sistrum

Isis in her role as mother and creator was depicted holding a pail, symbolizing the flooding of the Nile, in one hand and a sistrum in the other. The goddess Bast often is depicted holding a sistrum also, with it symbolizing her role as a goddess of dance, joy, and festivity.

Sistra are still used in the Alexandrian Rite and Ethiopic Rite. Besides the depiction in Egyptian art with dancing and expressions of joy, the sistrum was also mentioned in Egyptian literature. The hieroglyph for the sistrum is shown.

== Minoan sistrum ==
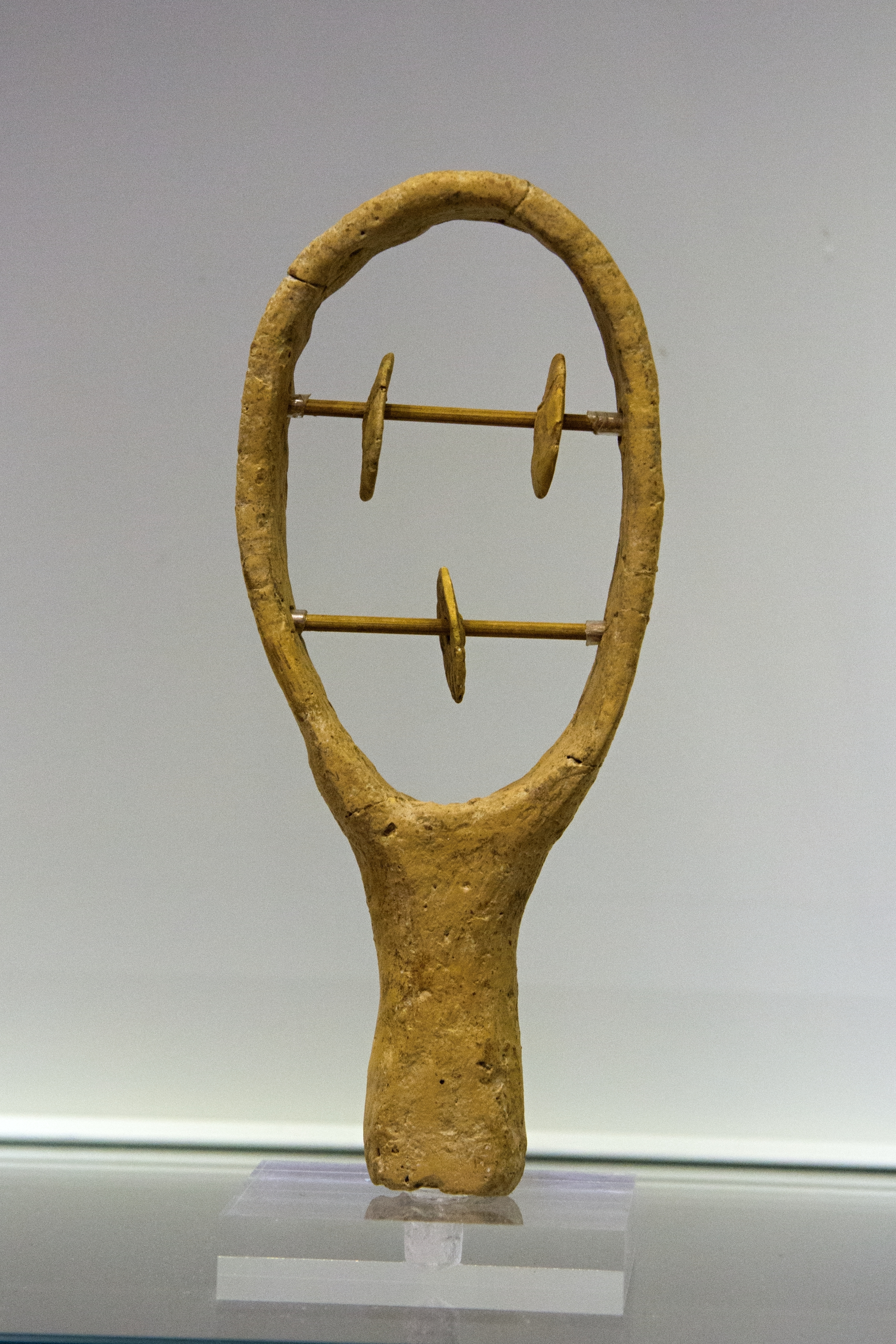
Minoan clay sistrum found in Archanes, Crete

The ancient Minoans also used the sistrum, and a number of examples made of local clay have been found on the island of Crete. Five of these are displayed at the Archaeological Museum of Agios Nikolaos. A sistrum is also depicted on the Harvester Vase, an artifact found at the site of Hagia Triada.

Minoans use of the sistrum perhaps also centered around Hathor in rituals involving fertility, entertainment aspects like music and dancing, as well as indulgence. Sistrums used by ancient Minoans show overlaps with ancient Egyptian usage through their similar use during funerary contexts. Evidence of two bronze Minoan sistra suggests that they were created by separately molding the arch and handle, joining the two together with rivets later in the process.

Researchers are not sure yet whether the clay sistra were actual instruments that were used to provide music or instead were models with only symbolic significance. But experiments with a ceramic replica show that a satisfactory clacking sound is produced by such a design in clay, so a use in rituals is probably to be preferred.

== Later use ==
The senasel (sistrum) and later crotalus remained a liturgical instrument in the Ethiopian Orthodox Church throughout the centuries and is played today during the dance performed by the debtera (cantors) on important church festivals. It is also occasionally found in Neopagan worship and ritual.

The sistrum was occasionally revived in 19th century Western orchestral music, appearing most prominently in Act 1 of the opera Les Troyens (1856–1858) by the French composer Hector Berlioz. Nowadays, however, it is replaced by its close modern equivalent, the tambourine. The effect produced by the sistrum in music – when shaken in short, sharp, rhythmic pulses – is to arouse movement and activity. The rhythmical shaking of the sistrum, like the tambourine, is associated with religious or ecstatic events, whether shaken as a sacred rattle in the worship of Hathor of ancient Egypt, or in the strident jangling of the tambourine in modern-day Evangelicalism, in Romani song and dance, on stage at a rock concert, or to heighten a large-scale orchestral tutti.

Classical composer Hans Werner Henze (1926–2012) calls for the flautist to play two sistra in his 1988 work Sonate für sechs Spieler (Sonata for six players).

=== West Africa ===
Various modern West African and Gabon rattle instruments are also called sistra (plural of sistrum): the calabash sistrum, the West Africa sistrum or disc rattle (n'goso m'bara) also called Wasamba or Wassahouba rattle. It typically consists of a V-shaped branch with some or many concave calabash discs attached, which can be decorated.

== Gallery ==
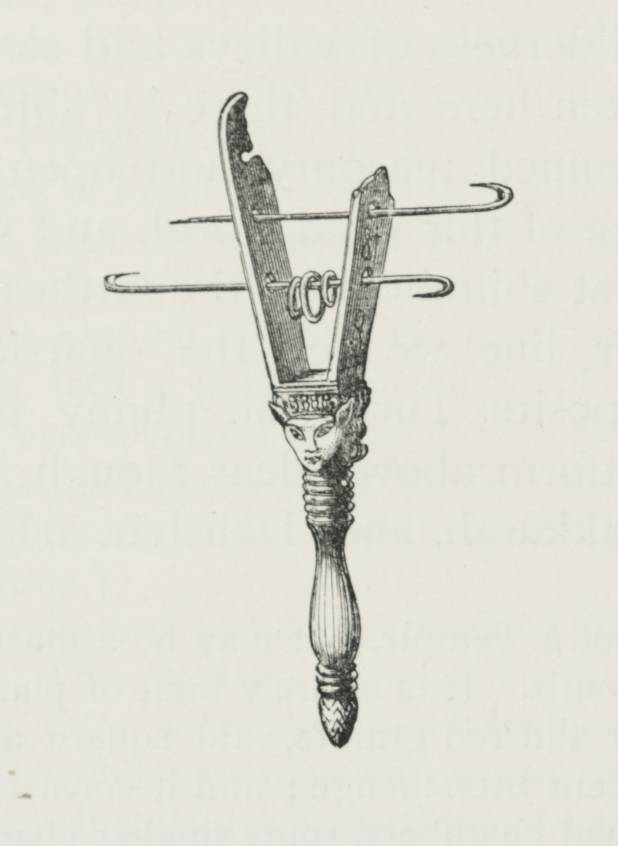
Broken Egyptian Sistrum

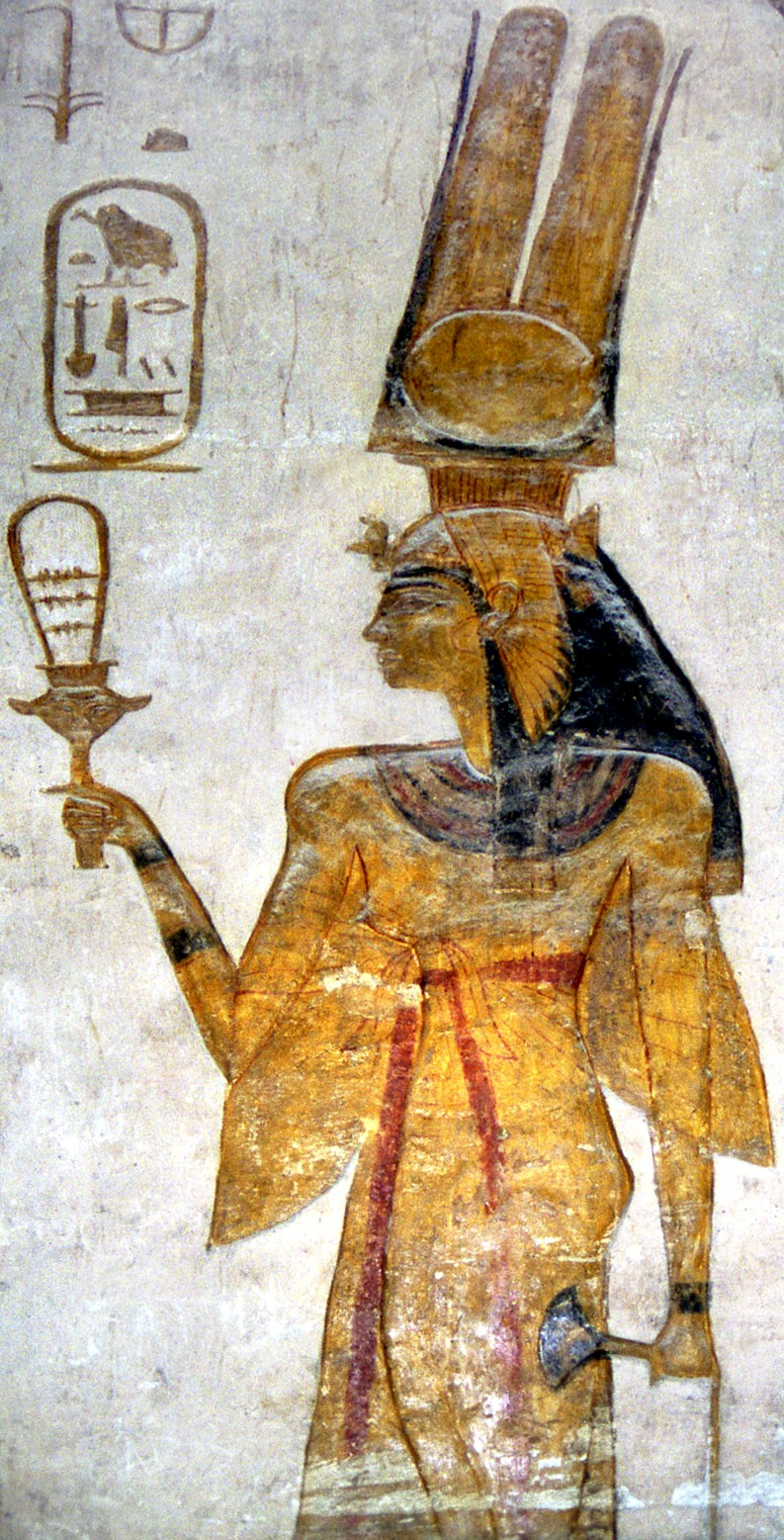
Nefertari, wife of Ramesses II, holding a sekhem-type sistrum

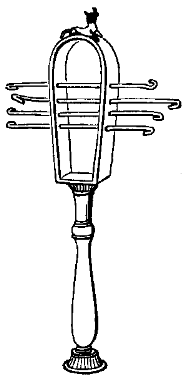
Egyptian Sistrum

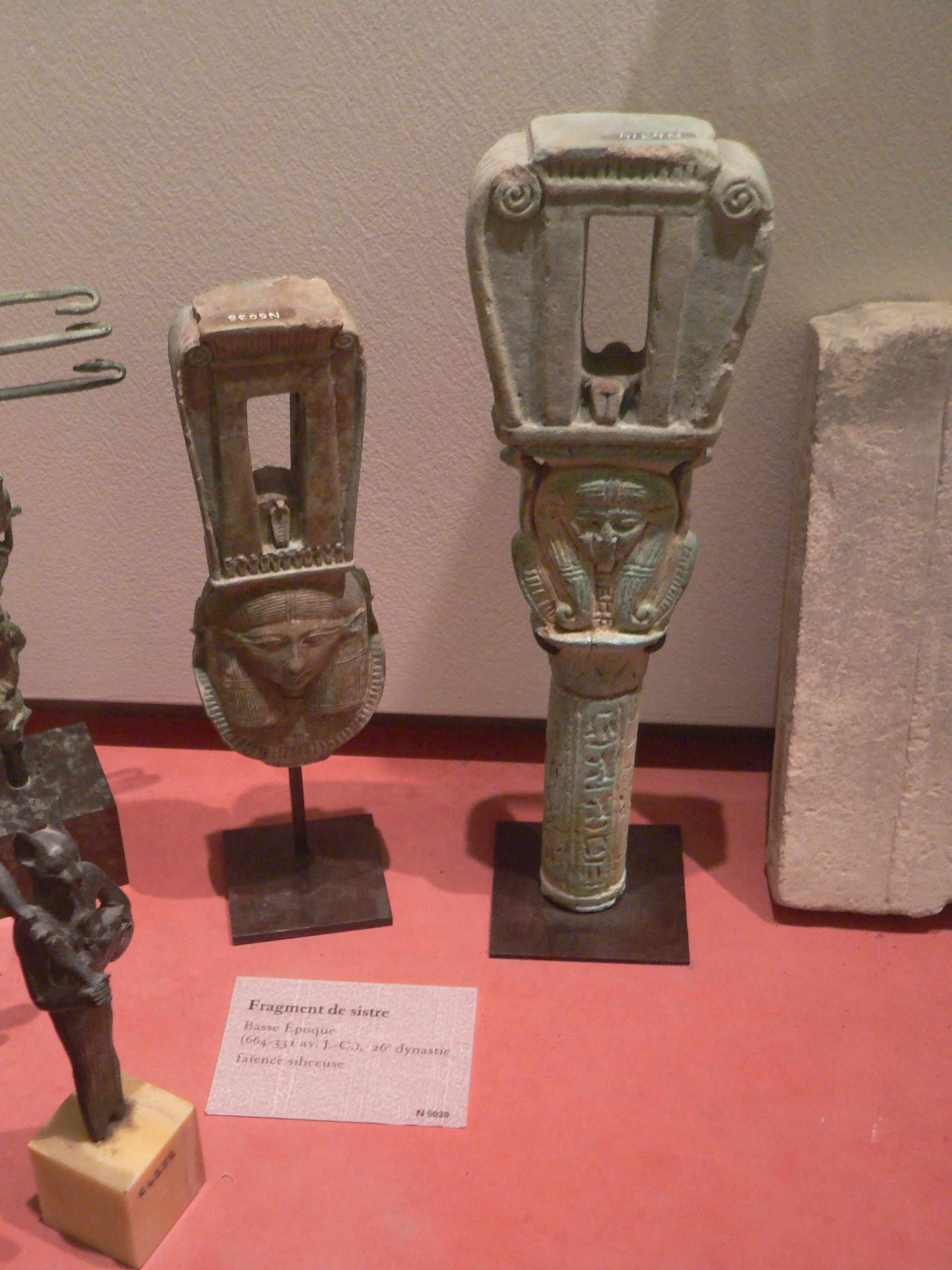
Collection of sistrums at the Louvre

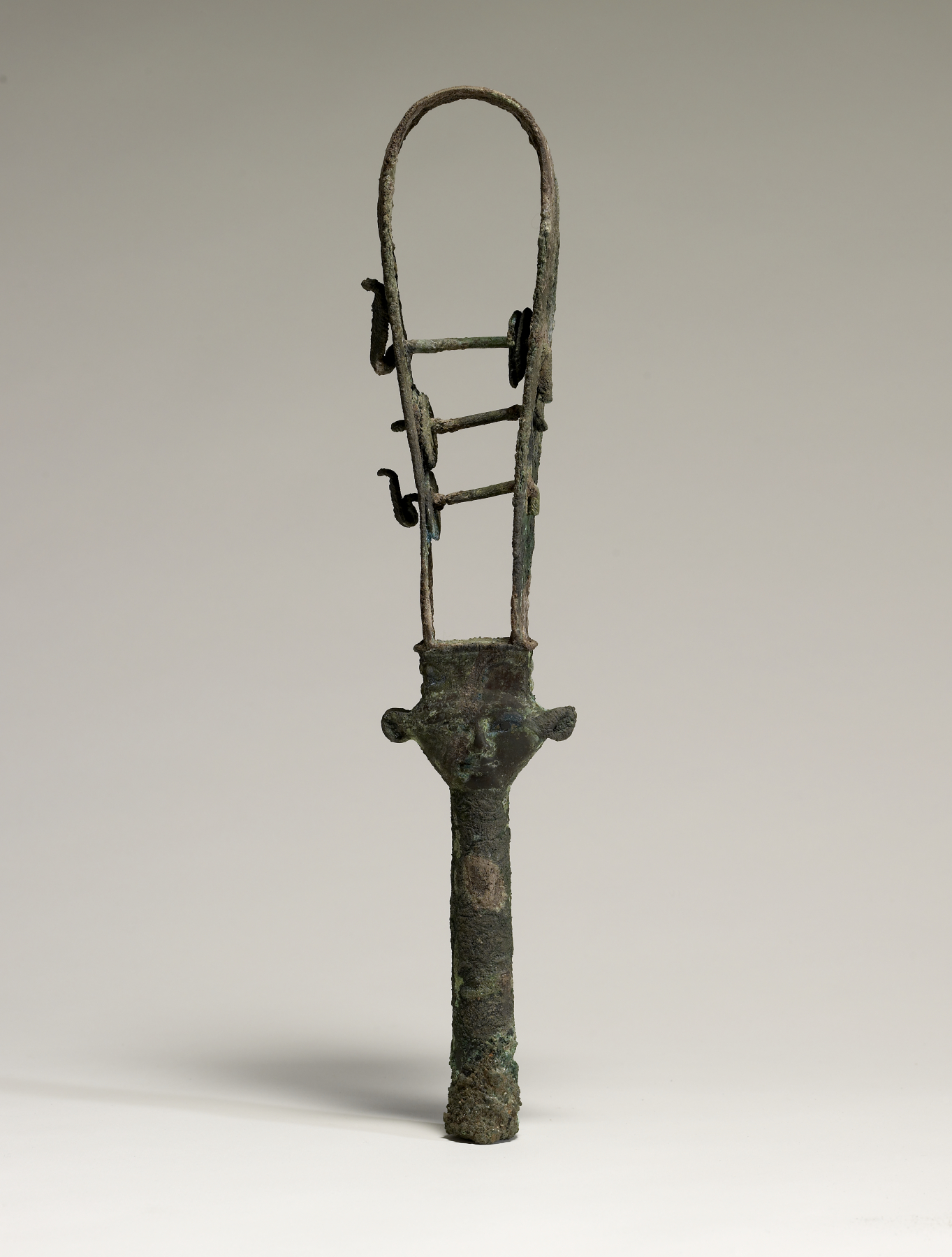
Walters Art Museum, ca. 380–250 BCE

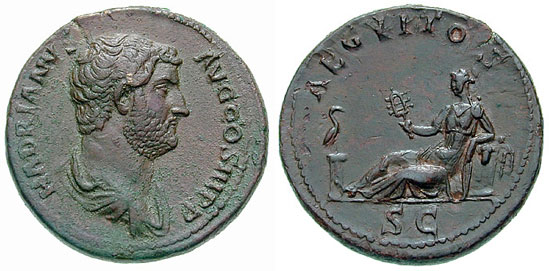
Seated woman with sistrum on a coin issued under Hadrian

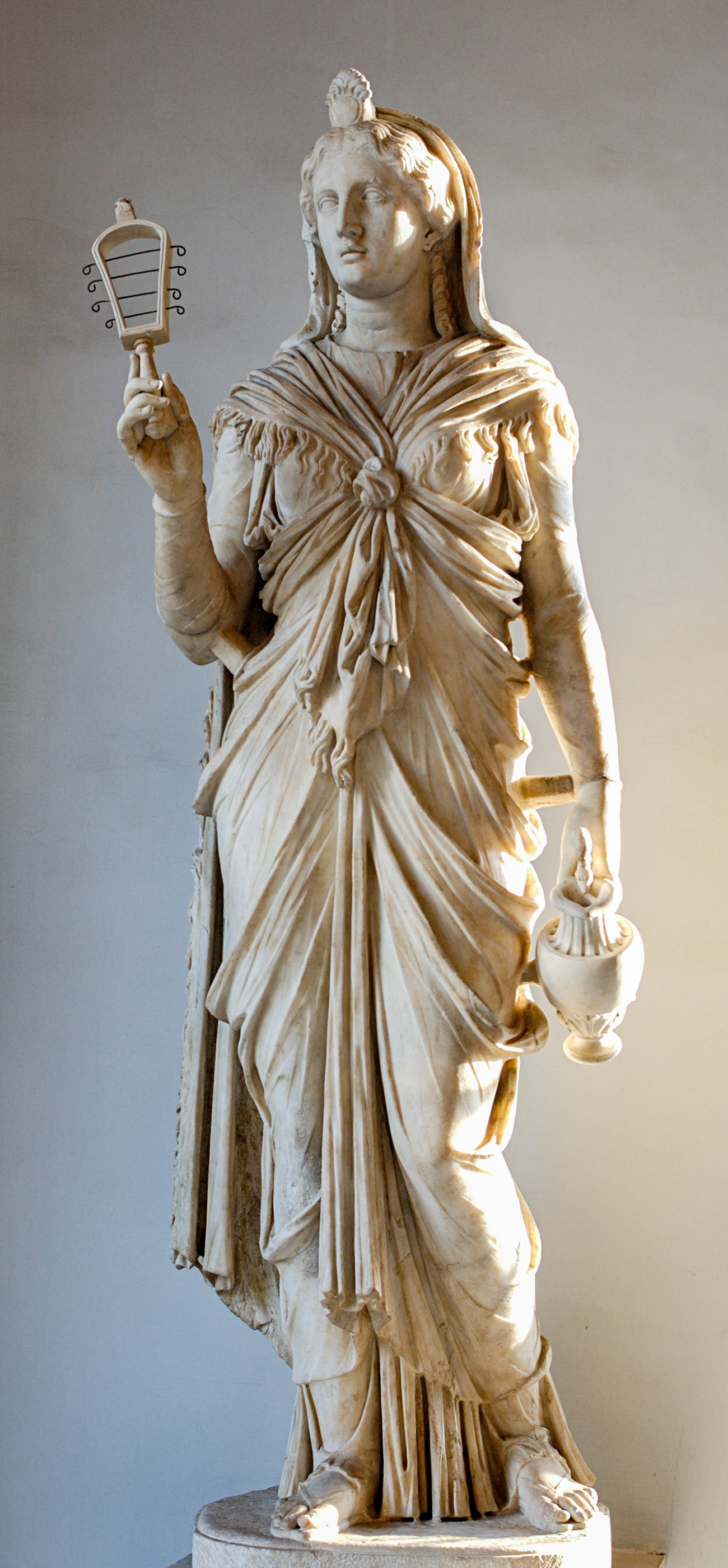
Romanized Isis holding a sistrum, also from the time of Hadrian

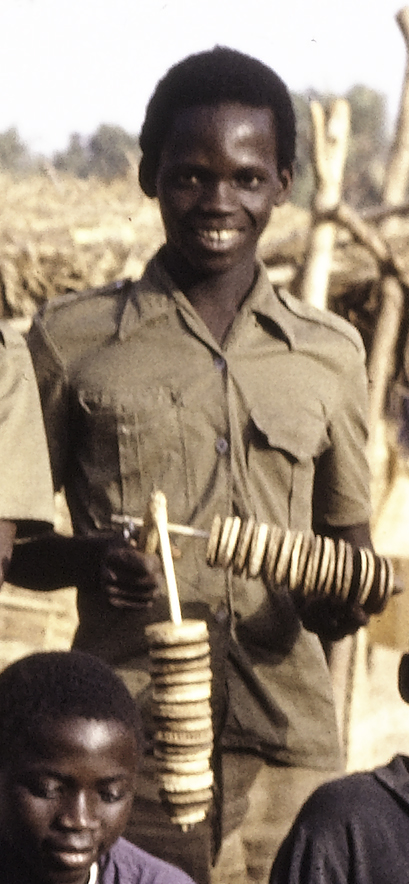
School band player holding two disc rattles (sistra), Ziguinchor, Senegal, 1973

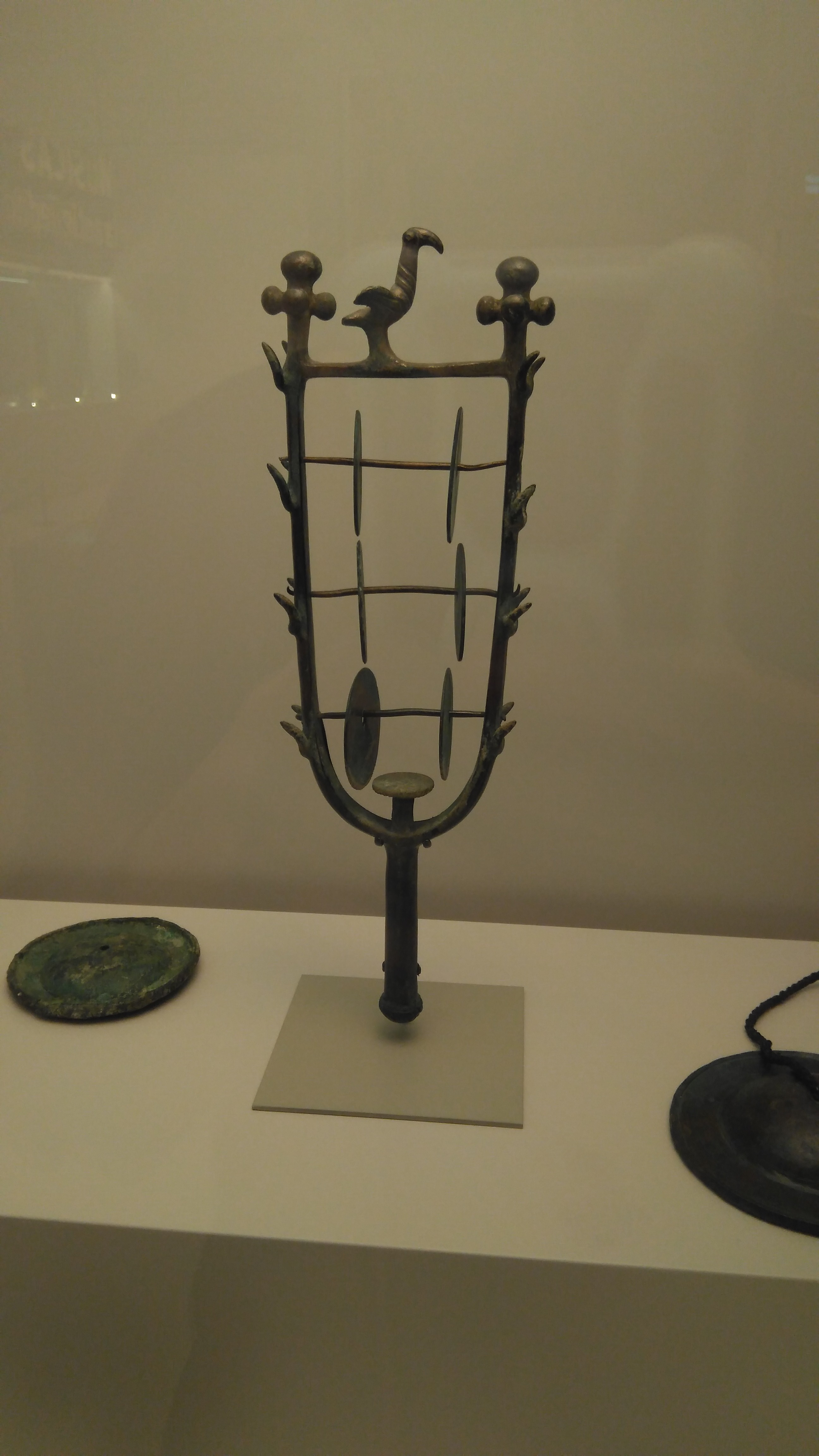
2300–2000 BC, Anatolia (Turkey), made in copper alloy.

== See also ==
- Kagura suzu (Shinto)
