= Ancient Senon =

Senon is the modern name for an ancient town and archaeological site in Roman Gaul located near the modern-day town of Senon in France, thought to have been inhabited by the Mediomatrici. The site is estimated to have been settled during the middle of the La Tène culture at the earliest and the beginning of Rome's occupation of Gaul at the latest.

Multiple jars were found containing tens of thousands of coins dated to between the years of 280 and 310. Around this time, a portion of the city was destroyed in a fire. It was abandoned in the decades following.
