= Melsonby Hoard =

Items from the Iron Age in Melsonby, England

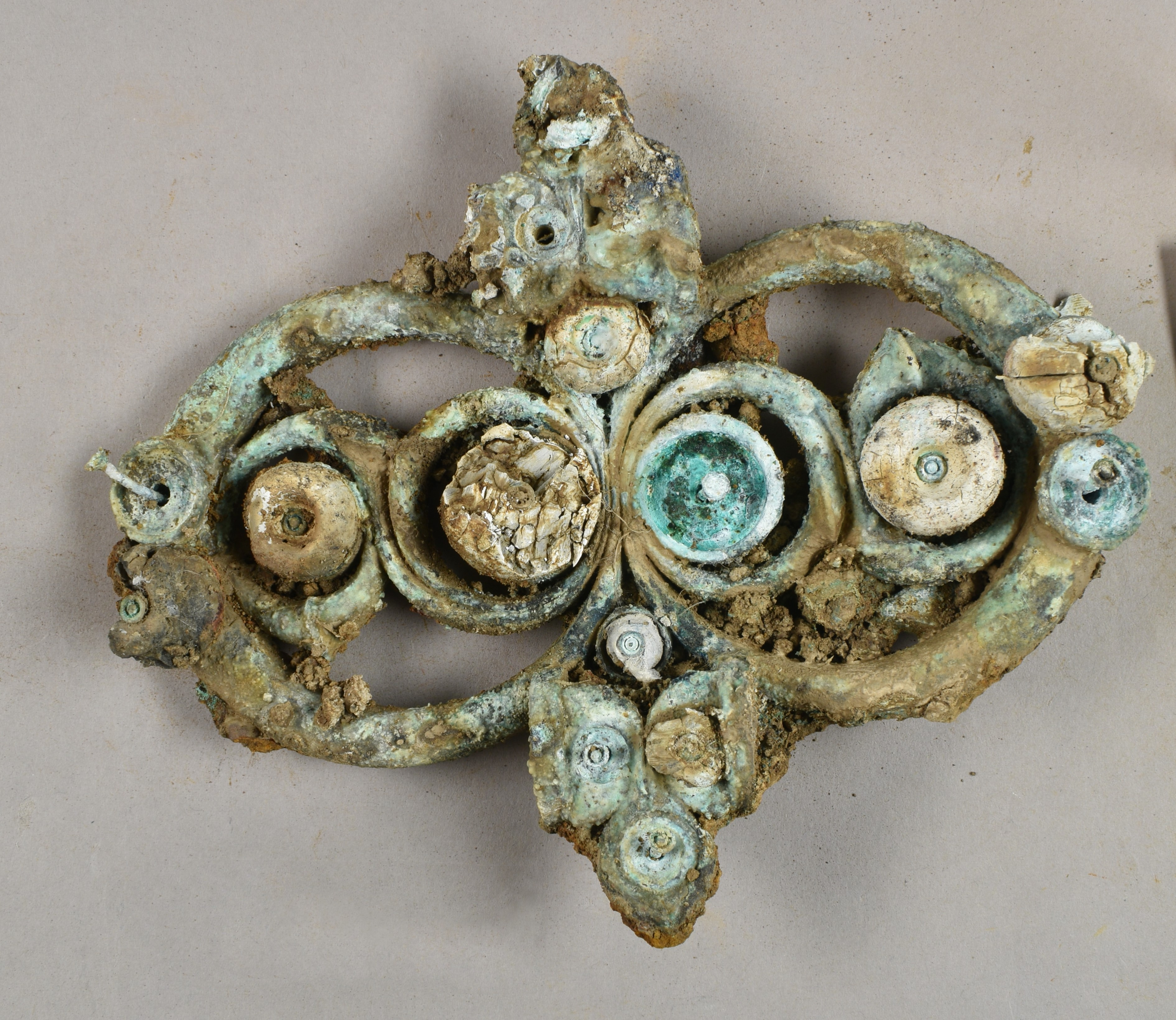
- A strap junction from the hoard
- Created: late 1st century BC - mid 1st century AD
- Period/culture: Late Iron Age (British Iron Age)
- Discovered: December 2021; Melsonby, North Yorkshire, England
- Identification: YORYM-0E157E

The Melsonby Hoard is a hoard of Iron Age items found buried in a field near the village of Melsonby in North Yorkshire, England, by Peter Heads, an amateur metal-detectorist, in December 2021. Archaeologists from Durham University excavated the site in 2022 with funding from Historic England. The artefacts are from the time of the Roman Empire, and show pottery, weaponry, use of the wheel, metallurgy and status symbolism. The find was publicised in March 2025, coinciding with the temporary display of a number of the items at the Yorkshire Museum in York.

== Discovery ==
The hoard was found in a field near the village of Melsonby in North Yorkshire, England, by Peter Heads, an amateur metal-detectorist, in December 2021. It was immediately designated treasure under the Treasure Act 1996. Heads reported his discovery, which led to archaeologists from Durham University excavating the site in 2022. The excavations were assisted by advice from the British Museum and funding from Historic England. The University of Southampton also contributed, providing sensing instruments which enabled the researchers to avoid damaging the delicate artefacts.

== Significance ==
Participating scientists described the hoard as internationally important and the largest hoard of Iron Age metalwork yet found in Britain. The hoard was deposited approximately when the Romans conquered southern Britain in the first century AD. The find spot is close to the Stanwick Iron Age Fortifications, a Celtic hillfort from the first century AD.

By March 2025 over 900 items had been discovered within the hoard spanning two separate deposits. The artefacts included adornments, a mirror made of iron, 14 elaborate pony harnesses, horse bits, three decorative spears, and two cauldrons. One cauldron, possibly a lidded wine-mixing bowl, shows a blend of Iron Age and Mediterranean styles. 28 iron tyres provided evidence for the use of four-wheeled wagons as well as two-wheeled chariots, at least seven vehicles in total. A further 88 objects were corroded together into a large mass, and are yet to be separated and examined. Materials used in the artefacts include copper alloy, iron and Mediterranean coral.

Many items were made colourful with glass and enamel. To demonstrate the high status of their owner, these luxury goods were deliberately damaged before burial, probably on a pyre albeit without bodies. The discovery called into question the old idea that southern British elites were more powerful than northern ones, and how money and power were displayed in the Iron Age. This aristocracy had connections not just across Britain but also Europe and the Roman world. The find is considered exceptional, "once-in-a-lifetime" and of an unprecedented number and diversity for the British Iron Age.

The excavation of the hoard was awarded the 2026 'Rescue project of the year' award at the Current Archaeology awards.

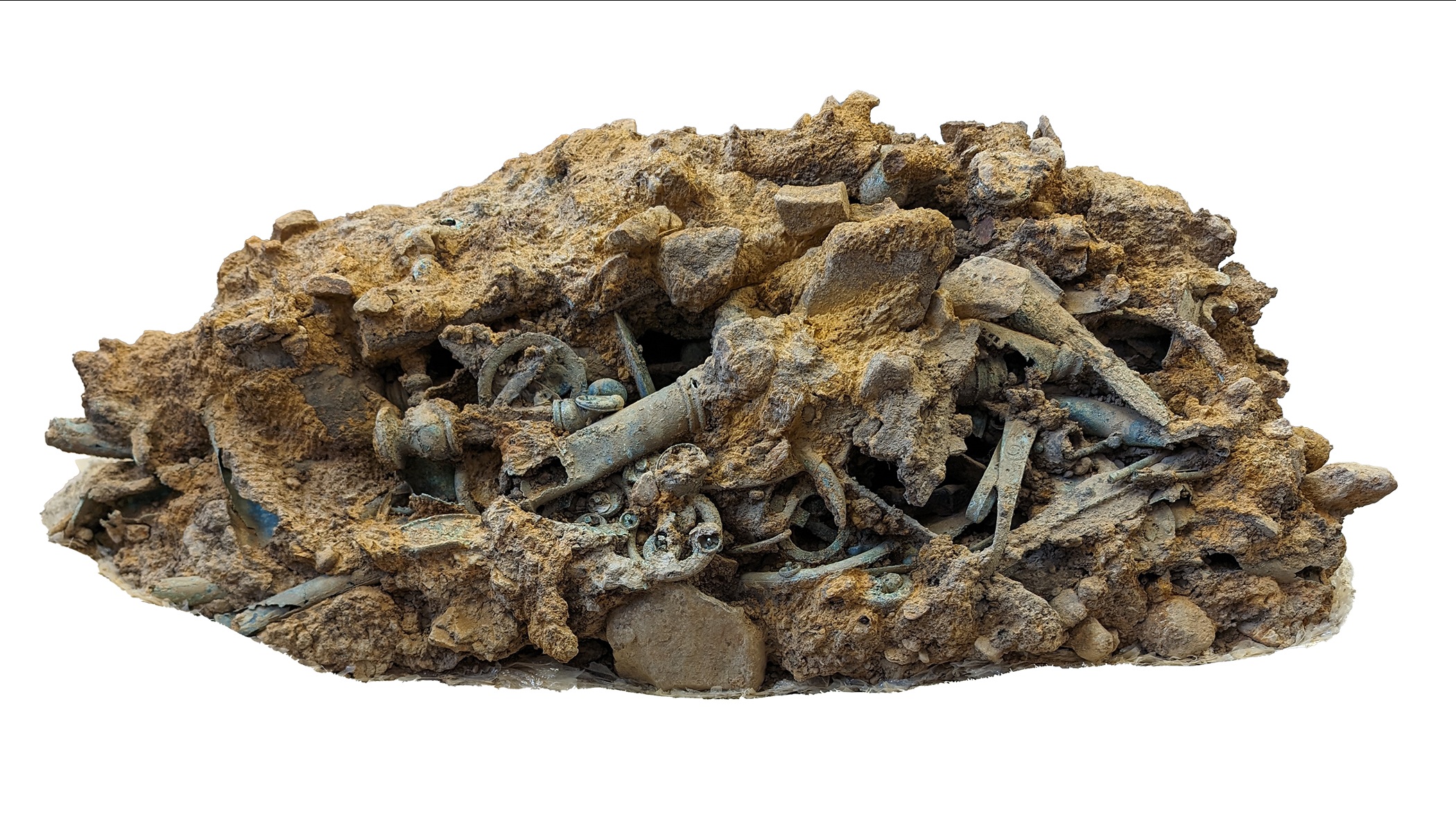

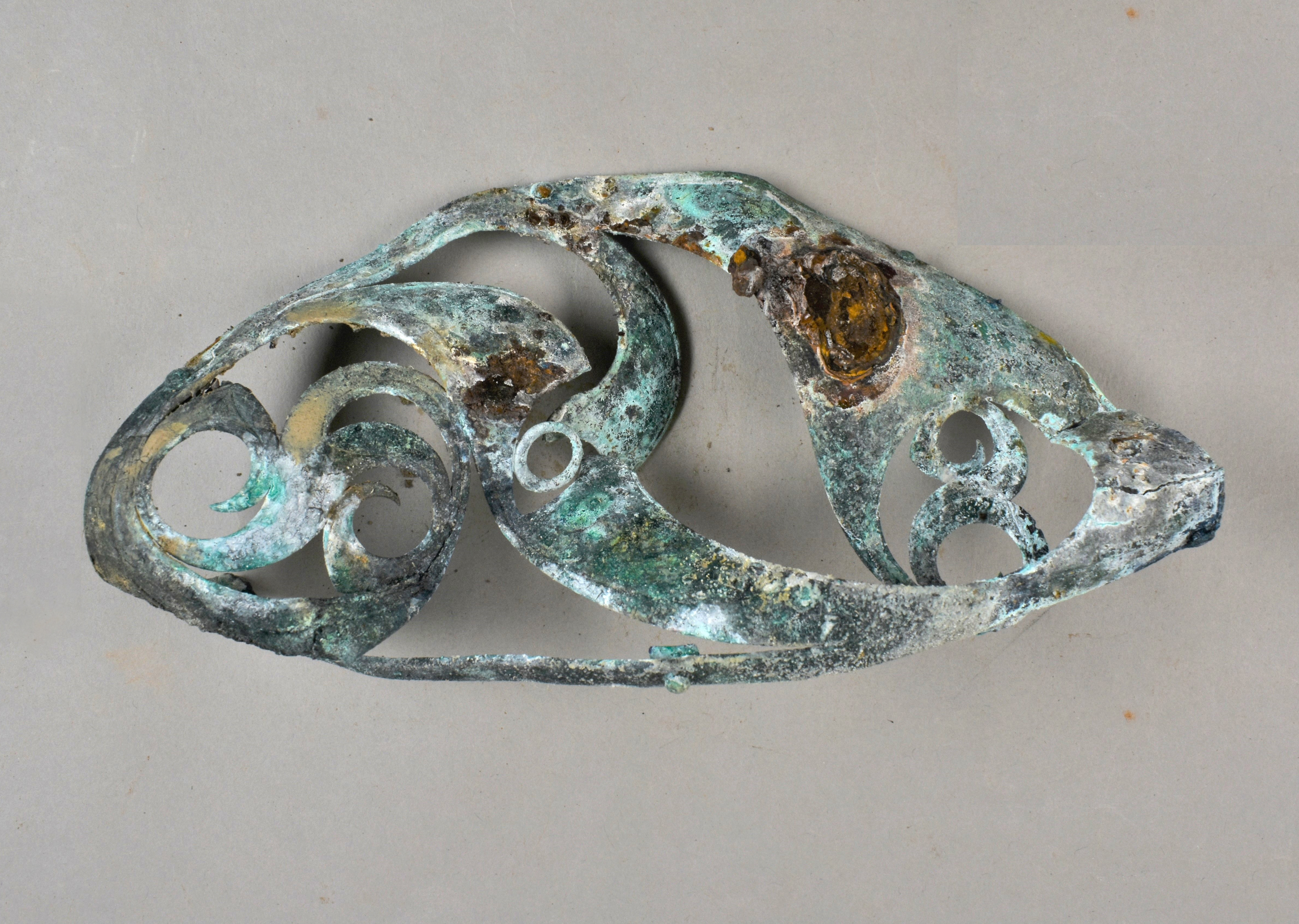

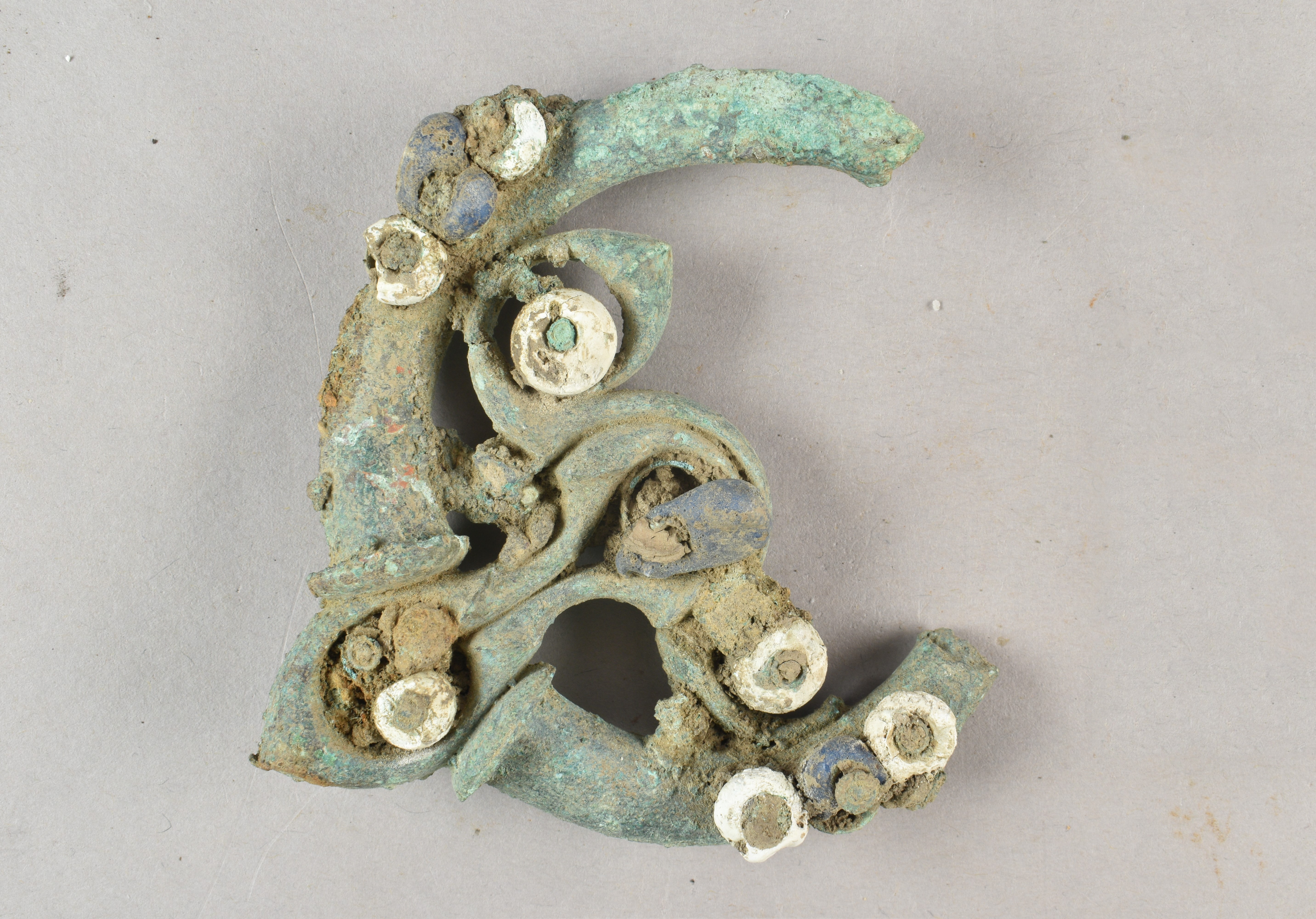

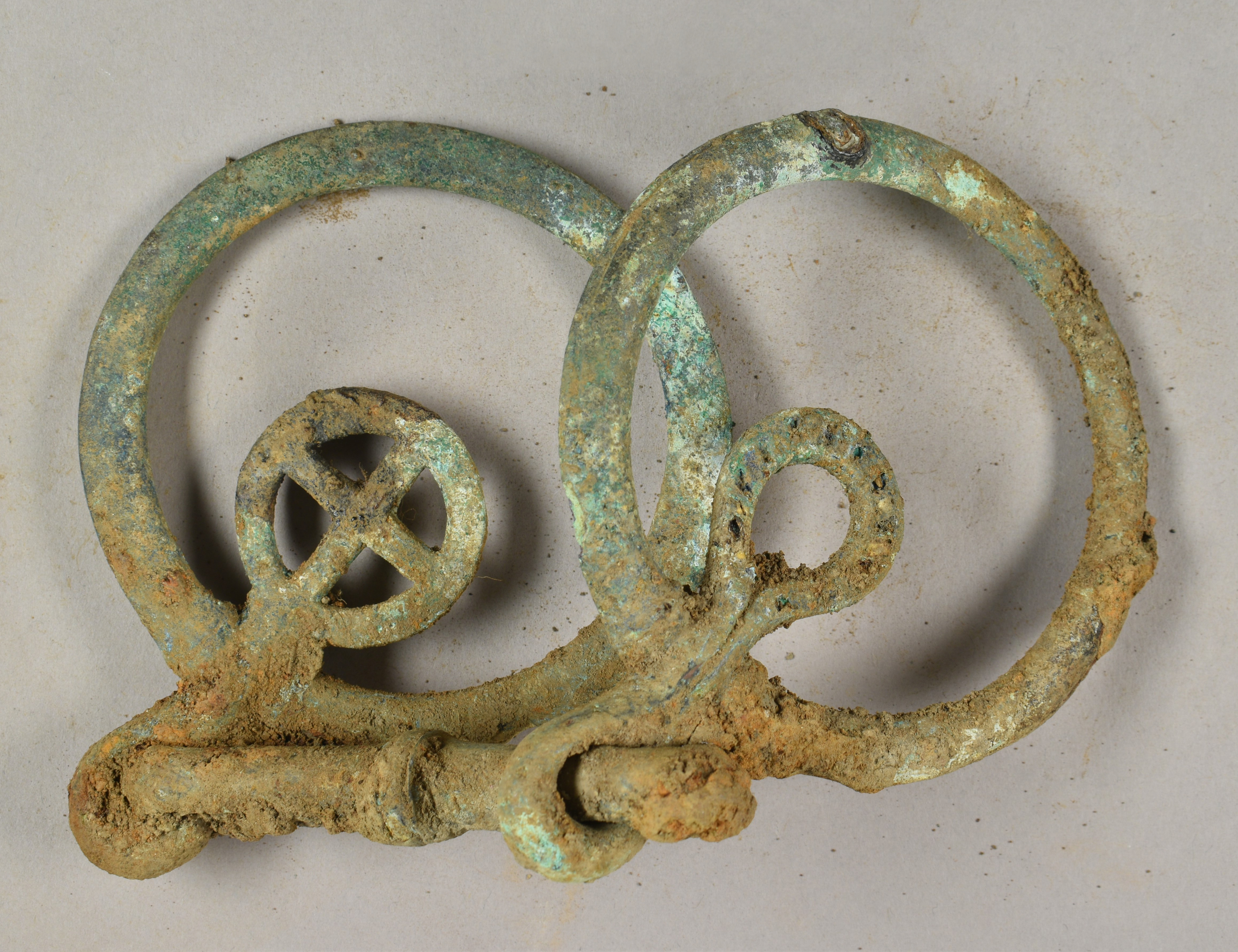

== Fundraising and display ==
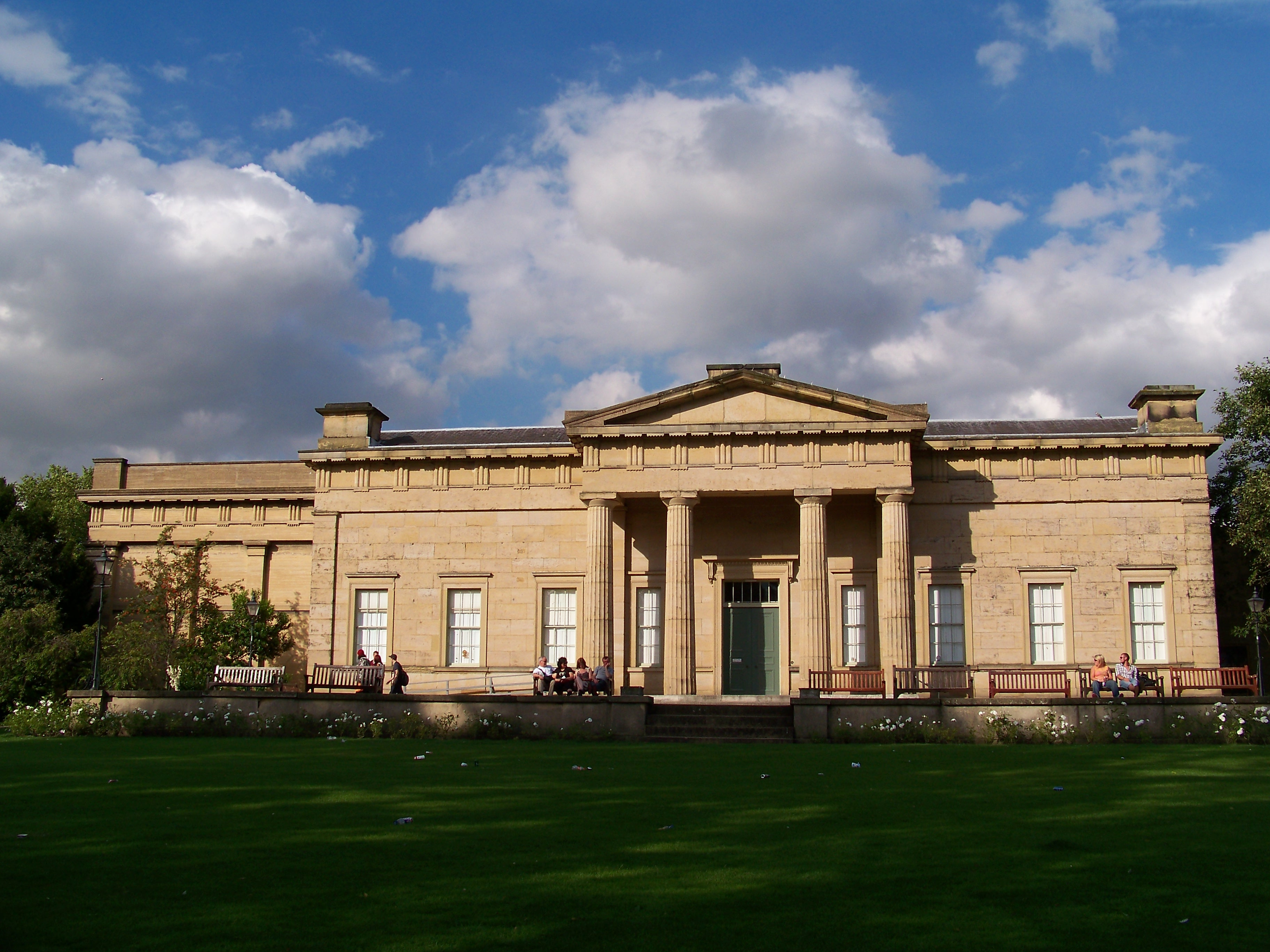
The Yorkshire Museum, where some of the hoard has been housed

A public appeal was launched by the Yorkshire Museum in March 2025 to raise £500,000 for the museum to acquire and conserve the hoard. It has been assessed to be worth £254,000, and under the Treasure Act 1996 the museum has the opportunity to acquire it for that price. If it cannot raise the funds the hoard may be sold and perhaps split up or moved overseas. Conservation of the hoard is estimated to cost a further £250,000. The museum started showing some items from the hoard on 25 March.

In July 2025, it was confirmed that the hoard would be acquired by the Yorkshire Museum following a successful public fundraising campaign and grant aid from the National Heritage Memorial Fund. The first public exhibition of the hoard was announced in February 2026. The exhibition 'Chariots, Treasure and Power: Secrets of the Melsonby Hoard' was opened on 15 May 2026 and is expected to run until Summer 2027.

== See also ==
- Stanwick Hoard – a similar Iron Age find in Melsonby from 1845.
