= Gnezdilovo =

Gnezdilovo Гнездилово
- Selo
- Location within Vladimir Oblast Location within Russia
- Coordinates: 56°21′N 40°22′E
- Country: Russia
- Region: Vladimir Oblast
- District: Suzdalsky District
- Time zone: UTC+3:00

Gnezdilovo (Russian: Гнезди́лово) is a rural locality (a selo) in Seletskoye Rural Settlement, Suzdalsky District, Vladimir Oblast, in European Russia. The population was 31 as of 2010.

== Geography ==
Gnezdilovo is located 11 km southwest of Suzdal (the district's administrative centre) by road. Chernizh is the nearest rural locality.
