= Ceyrançöl =

Village in Azerbaijan

Coordinates: 41°18′N 45°28′E

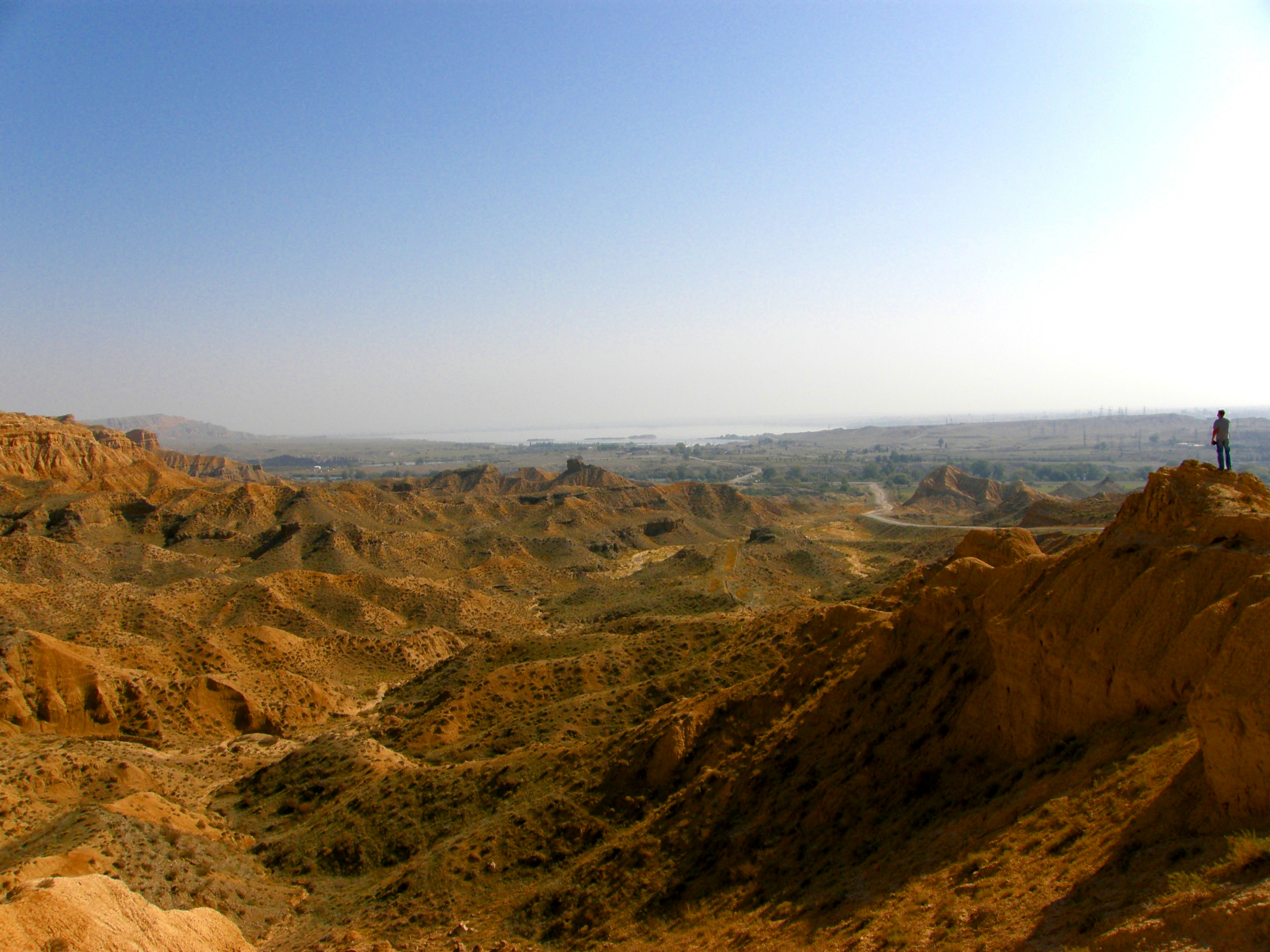
Ceyrançöl

Ceyrançöl (also, Jeyranchol) is a village in the municipality of Saloghlu in the Aghstafa District of Azerbaijan.
