= Saint Titus Cathedral =

Cathedral of Heraklion, Crete

- Καθεδρικός Ναός Αγίου Τίτου
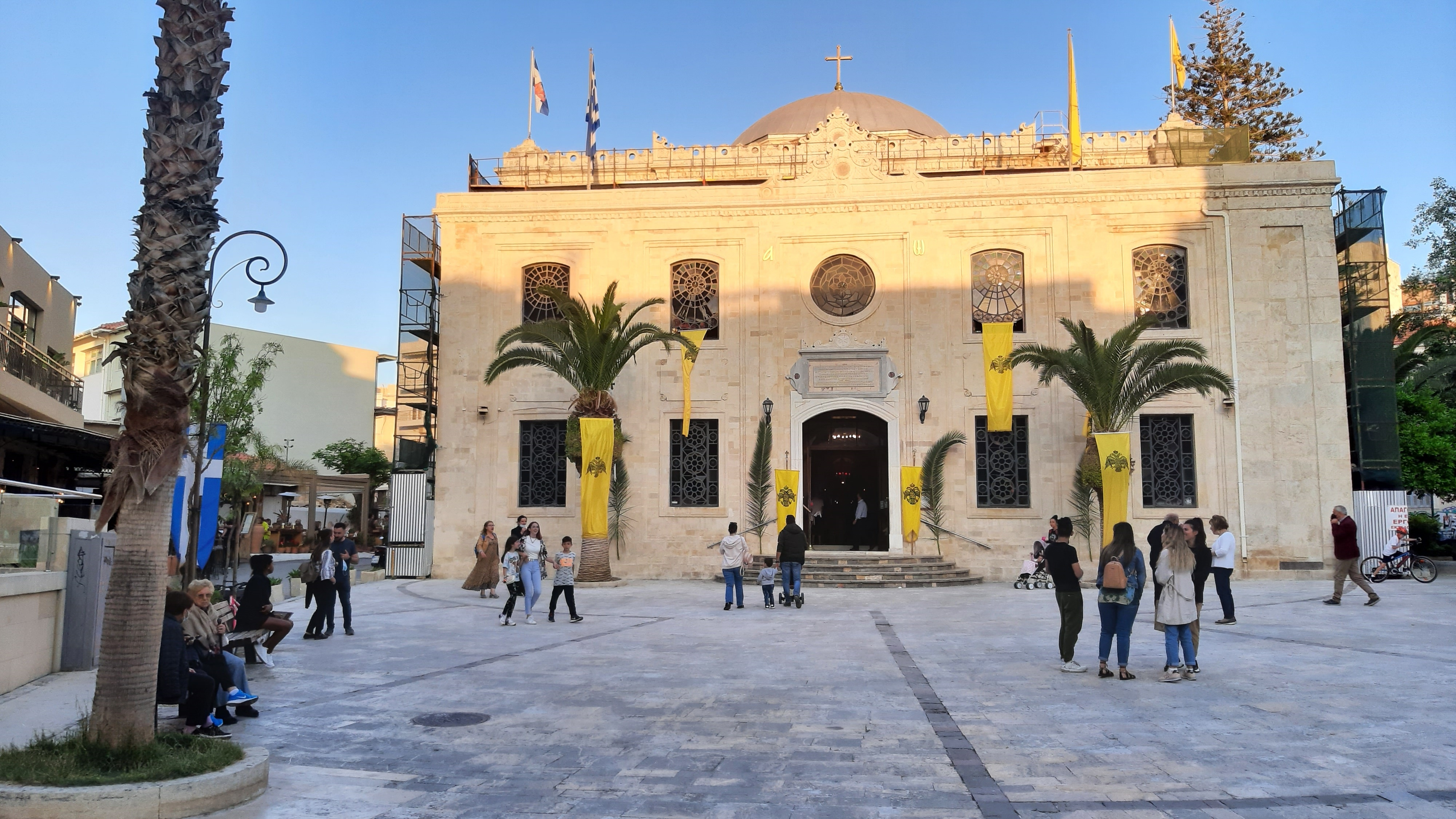

- Location of the cathedral on Crete
- Saint Titus Cathedral
- 35°20′24″N 25°08′05″E
- Location: Heraklion, Crete
- Country: Greece
- Language: Greek
- Denomination: Greek Orthodox
- Previous denomination: Islam (1869–1925)
- Website: agiostitos.gr (in Greek)

History
- Former name(s): New Mosque (Turkish: Yeni Cami)
- Status: Mosque (1869–1925); Church (1925–2013); Cathedral (since 2013– )
- Dedication: Saint Titus
- Dedicated: May 3, 1925

Architecture
- Functional status: Active
- Architect: Athanasios Mousis
- Architectural type: Mosque (1869)
- Style: Eclectic
- Completed: 1869 (as a mosque)

Specifications
- Materials: Stone

Administration
- Archdiocese: Crete

Clergy
- Archbishop: Eugenios II (Antonopoulos)

The Cathedral of Saint Titus (Greek: Καθεδρικός Ναός Αγίου Τίτου, romanized: Kathedrikos Naos Agiou Titou) is a Greek Orthodox church in the city of Heraklion, on the island of Crete, Greece. dedicated to Saint Titus. The current church was built in 1869 as a mosque, called the Yeni Cami ("New Mosque"), after the previous building was destroyed by the earthquake of 1856. In 1925 it was converted to Christian worship. The church was declared a cathedral of the archdiocese of Crete in 2013. The church is an eclectic style square temple with a dome. The exterior of the temple is dominated by vertical elements, while at the top there is a stone-carved apse.

== History ==
=== Previous church ===
After the reconquest of Crete by the Byzantines in 961, the episcopal seat of Crete was moved from Gortyn to Chandax (later Candia, modern Heraklion), which became the capital of the island. A new metropolitan church was built in Chandax, dedicated to the apostle Titus, the first bishop of Crete. That church was a single-aisled building. Various relics were brought to the church, among which the Holy Head of Titus and the icon of Virgin Mary Mesopanditissa. In 1210, Crete came under the control of the Venetians and a Roman Catholic archbishop was installed in the church. It underwent some modifications, such as the opening of a circular skylight and the construction of a bell tower. This first building was destroyed before the middle of the 15th century.

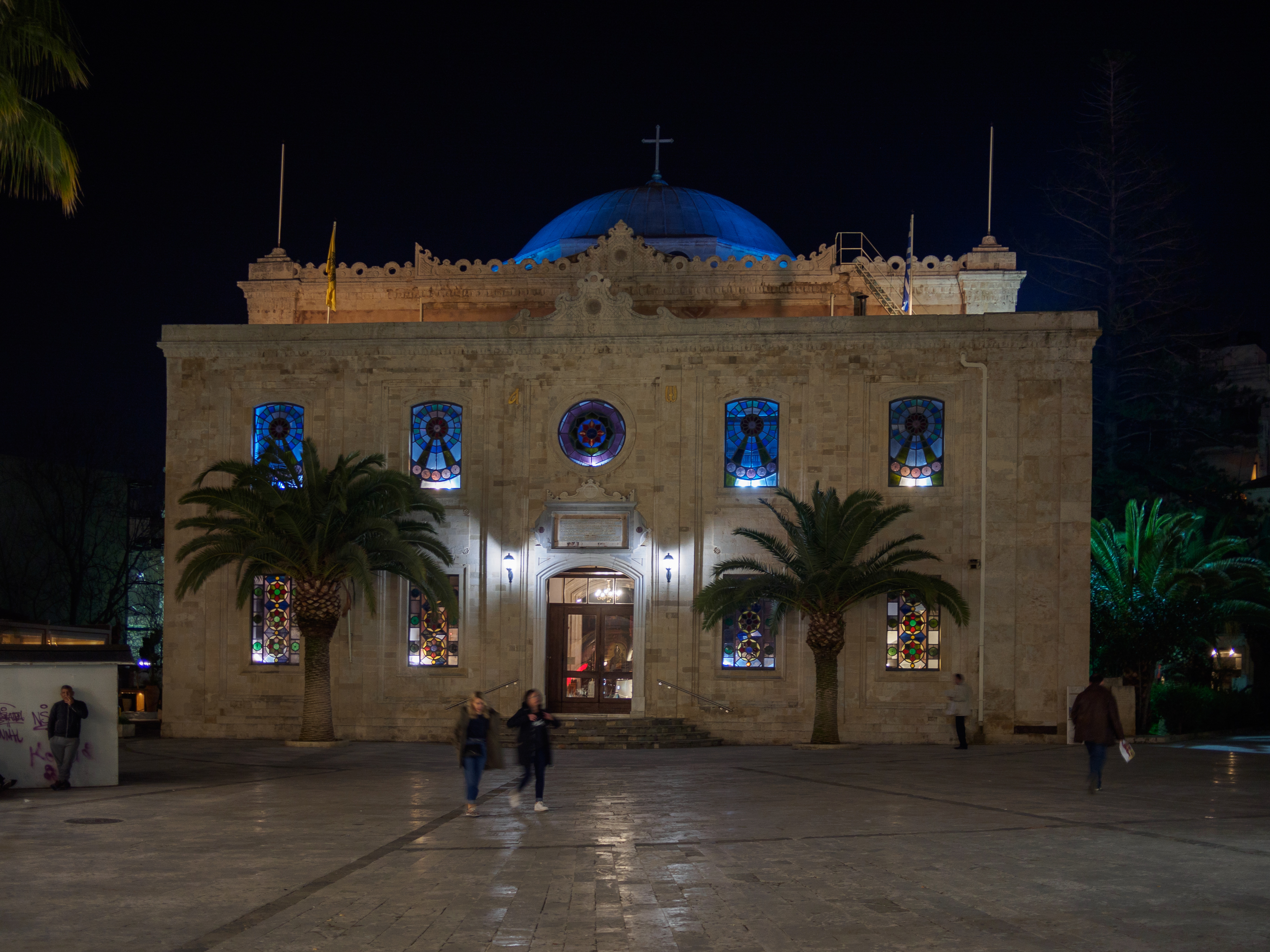
Saint Titus at night

The church was then rebuilt in the style of a three-aisled basilica and was inaugurated on January 3, 1446 by the archbishop of Crete, Fantino Dandolo. It was slightly damaged by the earthquake of 1508, and was destroyed by a fire on April 3, 1544, although the relics of the church were saved. The church was rebuilt in the same style in 1557.

After the fall of Candia to the Ottoman Turks in 1669, the relics and icon Panagia Mesopantitisa were moved to Venice and the church was converted into a Muslim mosque, dedicated to Köprülüzade Fazıl Ahmed Pasha, the conqueror of Crete and Candia. The mosque was also known as the Vizier Mosque. That building was destroyed by the earthquake of 1856.

=== Current building ===
Construction of the current building commenced in 1869 based on plans by Athanasios Moussis, who also designed, among others, the metropolitan church of Saint Menas. This new mosque building became known as the New Mosque (Turkish: Yeni Cami), although it retained its old name. After the integration of Crete into Greece and the exchange of Balkan Muslim populations for Anatolian Christian ones, the building was repaired by the Church of Crete and dedicated to Orthodox Christian worship on May 3, 1925. The minaret of the mosque was demolished. On May 15, 1966, the head of Saint Titus was returned to the church by the city of Venice.

Between 1974 and 1988, the church was renovated and restored.

In 2013, the church of Saint Titus was made cathedral of the Archdiocese of Crete by Archbishop Irenaeus.

== See also ==
- Church of Crete
- List of former mosques in Greece
- Ottoman Crete
- Ottoman architecture in the 19th–20th centuries
