= August 25 (Eastern Orthodox liturgics) =

Day in the Eastern Orthodox liturgical calendar

Eastern Orthodox liturgical calendar
August 24	August 25	August 26
August 25 O.S. ≍ September 7 N.S. August 25 N.S ≍ August 12 O.S.

An Eastern Orthodox cross

August 25 in Eastern Orthodox liturgical calendars is a feast day and a day of commemoration of saints and martyrs. Although some Orthodox churches use the Revised Julian Calendar and others use the traditional Julian calendar, the fixed commemorations for their respective August 25 are broadly the same, no matter which calendar is used. (Note: Despite the dates being the same, the days to which they refer typically differ by 13 days. The notation Old Style or O.S. is sometimes used to indicate a date in the traditional Julian Calendar (the "Old Calendar"). The notation New Style or N.S. indicates a date in the Revised Julian calendar (the "New Calendar").)

== Saints ==
- Apostle Titus of the Seventy Disciples, first Bishop of Crete (1st century) (Note: Name days celebrated today include: Titus (Τίτος).)
- Saints Barses (378) and Eulogius (c. 386), Bishops of Edessa, and St. Protogenes, Bishop of Carrhae (c. 387), Confessors.
- Saints John the Cappadocian (520) and Epiphanius (535), Patriarchs of Constantinople.
- Saint Menas, Patriarch of Constantinople (552)
- Saint John, Bishop of Karpathos (7th century) (Note: Little is known about his life. He probably lived in the 7th century AD. In the churches of the island Karpathos there are many murals and Icons of John as a saint. He was officially ranked to the Orthodox Hagiologion on 20 August 1985. He is said to be the author of the following work, which is contained in the Philokalia: "For the Encouragement of the Monks in India who had Written to Him, One Hundred Texts"; (in Greek) «Πρὸς τοὺς ἀπὸ τῆς Ἰνδίας προτρέψαντας μοναχοὺς παρακλητικός, 100 κεφάλαια».; See also: (in Greek) Άγιος Ιωάννης ο Καρπάθιος. Βικιπαίδεια. (Greek Wikipedia).)
- Synaxis of Hierarchs of Crete, Bishops of Gortyna:

- Cyril (c. 303)
- Eumenius (7th century) (see also: September 18)
- Andrew of Crete, Archbishop (740)

== Pre-Schism Western saints ==
- Saint Geruntius of Italica, a missionary in Spain in the Apostolic Age, Bishop of Talco (Italica, near Seville) and martyr (c. 100) (Note: "At Italica, in Spain, St. Gerontius, a bishop, who preached the Gospel in that country in apostolic times, and after many labors died in prison.")
- Martyrs Eusebius, Pontian, Vincent and Peregrinus, in Rome (c. 192) (Note: "At Rome, in the time of the emperor Commodus, the holy martyrs Eusebius, Pontian, Vincent, and Peregrinus, who were first racked, distended by ropes, then beaten with rods and burned on their sides. As they continued faithfully to praise Christ, they were scourged with leaded whips until they expired.")
- Saints Nemesius and Lucilla, a deacon, and his daughter martyred in Rome under Valerian (c. 260) (Note: The translation of their relics is observed on October 31.)
- Saint Genesius of Rome (Genesius the Actor), an actor in Rome who took part in a satire on Orthodox baptism, was suddenly converted and martyred (c. 286 or c. 303) (Note: "Also, at Rome, St. Genesius, martyr, who embraced the profession of actor while he was yet a Pagan. One day he was deriding the Christian mysteries in the theatre in the presence of the emperor Diocletian; but by the inspiration of God he was suddenly converted to the faith and baptized. By the command of the emperor, he was forthwith most cruelly beaten with rods, then racked, and a long time lacerated with iron hooks, and burned with fire-brands. As he remained firm in the faith of Christ, and said: "There is no king besides Christ. Should you kill me a thousand times, you shall not be able to take Him from my lips or my heart," he was beheaded, and thus merited the palm of martyrdom.")
- Saint Genesius of Arles (Genès), martyr (303) (Note: A notary in Arles in France who refused to put on record an imperial decree against Orthodox Christians and declared that he himself believed in Christ. He was martyred under Maximian Herculeus.) (Note: "At Aries, in France, another blessed Genesius, who, filling the office of notary, and refusing to record the impious edicts by which Christians were commanded to be punished, threw away his tablets publicly, and declared himself a Christian. He was seized and beheaded, and thus attained to the glory of martyrdom through baptism in his blood.")
- Saint Maginus (Magí), martyr (304) (Note: Born in Tarragona in Spain, he enlightened the people near his native town and was finally beheaded under Diocletian.)
- Saint Marcian of Saignon, founder of the monastery of St Eusebius in Apt (485)
- Saint Aredius of Limousin (Yrieix, Yriez), Gaul (591) (Note: Born in Limoges in France, he founded Atane in the Limousin, which was later called after him, as also was the village of Saint Yrieux which grew up around the monastery.)
- Saint Patricia of Naples, virgin (c. 665) (Note: Born in Constantinople and related to the imperial family, in order to escape marriage she went on a pilgrimage to Jerusalem and then to Rome, where she became a nun. She died in Naples in Italy where she is one of the patron-saints.)
- Saint Ebba the Elder, Abbess of Coldingham, Northumbria (683) (Note: Sister of Sts Oswald and Oswy, Kings of Northumbria, she became a nun at Lindisfarne. Having founded the convent of Coldingham, now in Scotland, she became abbess there.)
- Saint Hunegund (c. 690) (Note: Forced to marry against her will, she persuaded her bridegroom to accompany her to Rome, where she became a nun. They returned to France and Hunegund entered the convent of Homblières, while her betrothed became a priest.)
- Saint Warinus (Guarinus, Warren), son of St Sigrada, martyred in France by the tyrant Ebroin who was at war with his brother St Leodegarius (7th century)
- Saint Gregory of Utrecht, Abbot of St. Martin Monastery in Utrecht (775) (Note: Born in Trier in Germany, he met St Boniface when still a child and later became a monk. He became Abbot of St Martin's at Utrecht in the Netherlands and then Bishop of the same city for twenty-two years. St Martin's was a seedbed of saints.)

== Post-Schism Orthodox saints ==
- Venerable Gennadius Scholarius, Patriarch of Constantinople (c. 1473)

=== New martyrs and confessors ===
- New Hieromartyr Moses (Kozhin), Hieromonk of Solovki Monastery (1931) (Note: See: (in Russian) Моисей (Кожин). Википедии. (Russian Wikipedia).)
- New Hieromartyr Vladimir Moschansky, Priest (1938)

== Other commemorations ==
- Translation of the relics (580) of Apostle Bartholomew (1st century) from Anastasiopolis to Lipari.
- Translation of the relics (580?) of Martyr Sabbas of Venethalon (Venetalus) (1st century) (Note: He is unknown in the Synaxaria and the Menaia. His memory is recorded in the Sinaitic Codex 631 (10th-11th centuries) as follows (translation): "... ...are deposited the relics of (Apostle) Bartholomew in Lipari and of the Holy Martyr Saba Venethalon".; (in Greek) «Τίτου καὶ κατάθεσις λειψάνου Βαρθολομαίου ἐν Σηκῷ τῆς Λιπάρεως καὶ τοῦ Ἁγίου Μάρτυρος Σάβα Βενεθάλων».)
- Translation of the relics (c. 860) of St. Hilda of Whitby (680)
- Repose of Abbess Magdalene of Sevsk Convent (1848)
- Repose of Monk Benjamin of Valaam (1848)
- Repose of Abbot Nikon (Vorobiev) of Gzhatsk (1963) (Note: See: (in Russian) Никон (Воробьёв). Википедии. (Russian Wikipedia).)

== Icon gallery ==
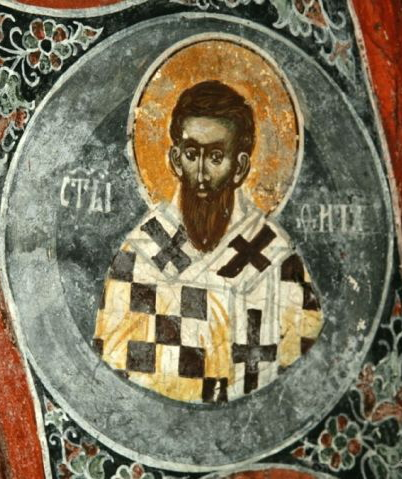
Apostle Titus, first Bishop of Crete.

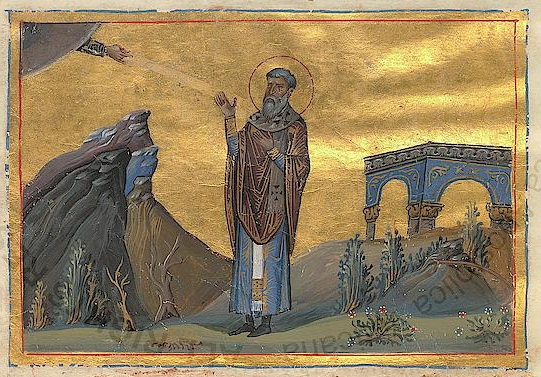
Saint Eumenes, Bishop of Gortyna

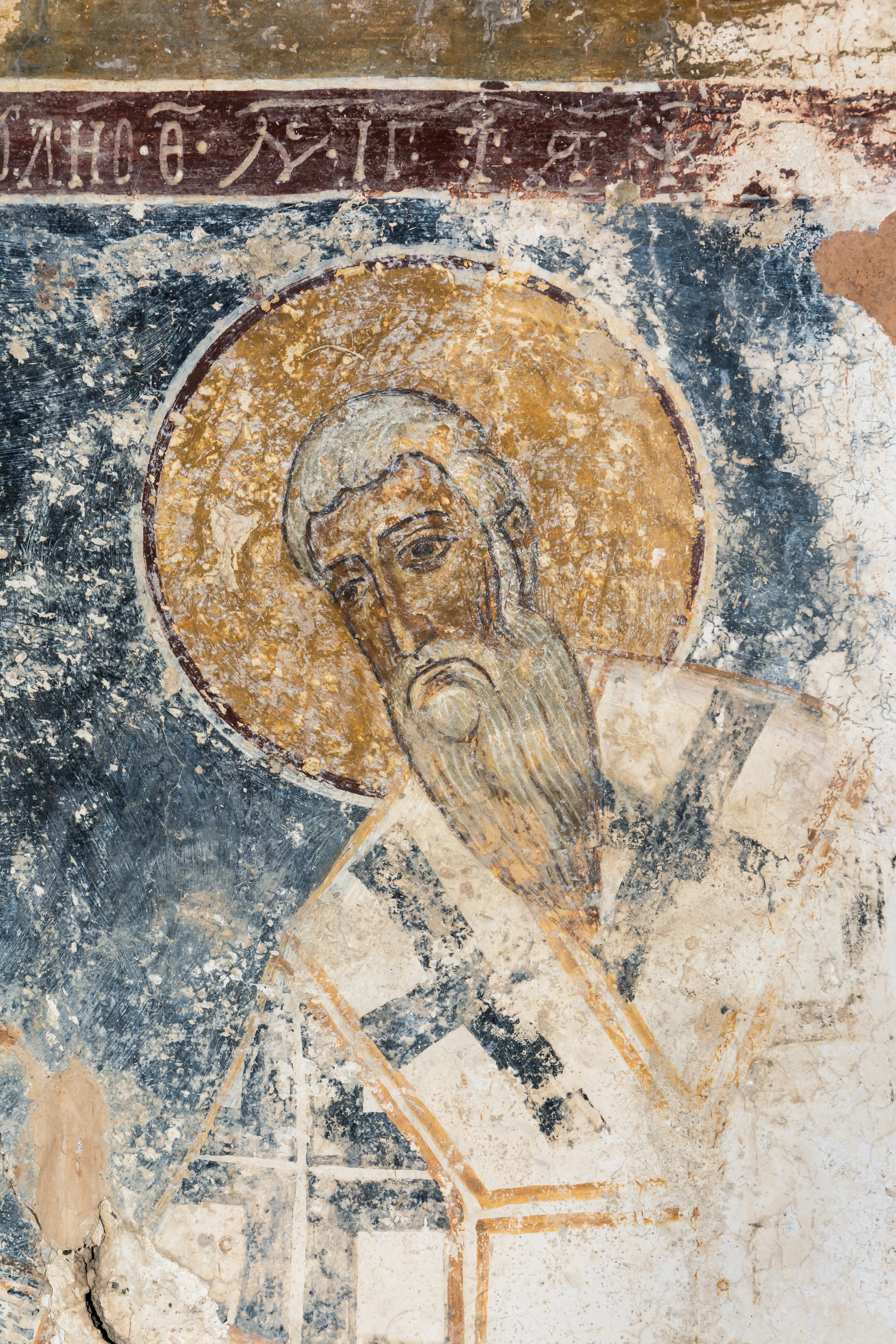
Saint Andrew, Archbishop of Crete

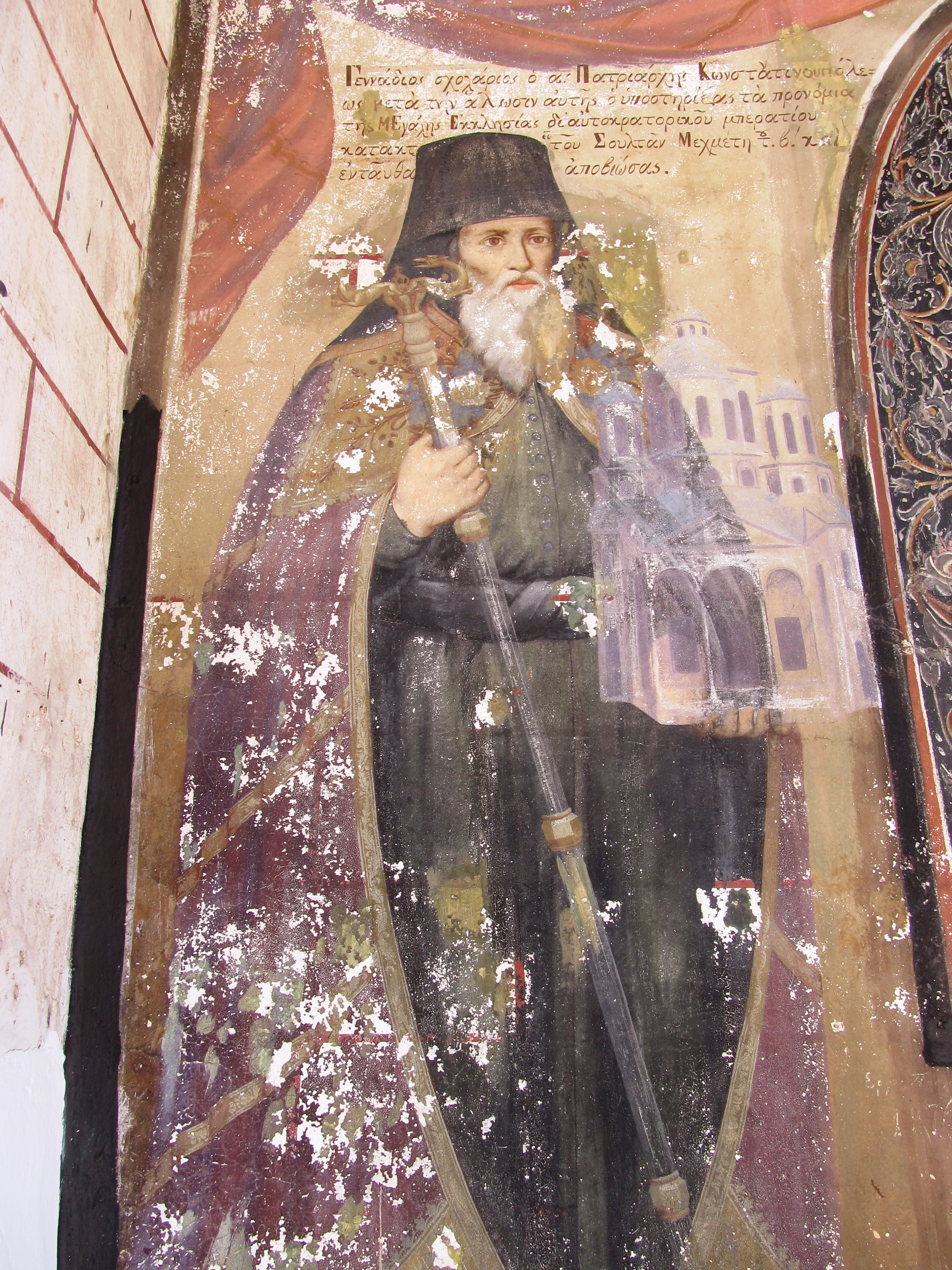
Saint Gennadius Scholarius, Ecumenical Patriarch of Constantinople

== Sources ==
- August 25 / September 7. Orthodox Calendar (PRAVOSLAVIE.RU).
- September 7 / August 25. Holy Trinity Russian Orthodox Church (A parish of the Patriarchate of Moscow).
- August 25. OCA - The Lives of the Saints.
- The Autonomous Orthodox Metropolia of Western Europe and the Americas (ROCOR). St. Hilarion Calendar of Saints for the year of our Lord 2004. St. Hilarion Press (Austin, TX). p. 63.
- The Twenty-Fourth Day of the Month of August. Orthodoxy in China.
- August 25. Latin Saints of the Orthodox Patriarchate of Rome.
- The Roman Martyrology. Transl. by the Archbishop of Baltimore. Last Edition, According to the Copy Printed at Rome in 1914. Revised Edition, with the Imprimatur of His Eminence Cardinal Gibbons. Baltimore: John Murphy Company, 1916. pp. 257–258.
- Rev. Richard Stanton. A Menology of England and Wales, or, Brief Memorials of the Ancient British and English Saints Arranged According to the Calendar, Together with the Martyrs of the 16th and 17th Centuries. London: Burns & Oates, 1892. pp. 411–413.

Greek Sources

- Great Synaxaristes: (in Greek) 25 ΑΥΓΟΥΣΤΟΥ. ΜΕΓΑΣ ΣΥΝΑΞΑΡΙΣΤΗΣ.
- (in Greek) Συναξαριστής. 25 Αυγούστου. ECCLESIA.GR. (H ΕΚΚΛΗΣΙΑ ΤΗΣ ΕΛΛΑΔΟΣ).

Russian Sources

- (in Russian) 7 сентября (25 августа). Православная Энциклопедия под редакцией Патриарха Московского и всея Руси Кирилла (электронная версия). (Orthodox Encyclopedia - Pravenc.ru).
