= Metallum =

Metallum is the Latin word for "metal". It may refer to:

- Matalia, a town of ancient Crete also known as Metallum
- Metallum Martis, a 1665 book by Dud Dudley
- Encyclopaedia Metallum, an online encyclopedia of heavy metal bands and musicians
- Metallum Nostrum, a cover album by German power metal band Powerwolf
