= Pyranthus (Crete) =

Coordinates: 35°06′08″N 25°11′33″E

Pyranthus or Pyranthos (Ancient Greek: Πύρανθος) was a small town in ancient Crete, near Gortyna.

Its site is located near modern Trokhales, Pyrathi.
