= Eumenes (disambiguation) =

Eumenes /ˈjuːmɪniːz/ may refer to:

- Eumenes of Cardia (c. 362 BC - 316 BC), a general and scholar in Ancient Greece
- Several members of the ruling Attalid dynasty of Pergamon
  - Eumenes I (ruled 263 BC - 241 BC)
  - Eumenes II (ruled 197 BC - 160 BC)
  - Eumenes III (died 129 BC), illegitimate son of Eumenes II and pretender to the throne
- Eumenes, a late third century BC sculptor of the Pergamene school
- Eumenes of Bactria, an associate king of Antimachus I of Baktria
- Saint Eumenes, a 7th-century bishop of Gortyna
- Eumenes (wasp), a genus of potter wasps
