= Pylorus (Crete) =

Town of ancient Crete

Coordinates: 35°00′13″N 24°56′27″E

Pylorus or Pyloros was a town of ancient Crete, south of Gortyna.

Its site is located near modern Plora.
