= Metallon =

Metallon may refer to:

- Metallon (Crete), a town of ancient Crete, Greece
- Metallon Corporation, a gold mining company
