= September 18 (Eastern Orthodox liturgics) =

Day in the Eastern Orthodox liturgical calendar

Eastern Orthodox liturgical calendar
September 17	September 18	September 19
September 18 O.S. ≍ October 1 N.S. September 18 N.S ≍ September 5 O.S.

An Eastern Orthodox cross

September 18 in Eastern Orthodox liturgical calendars is a feast day and a day of commemoration of saints and martyrs. Although some Orthodox churches use the Revised Julian Calendar and others use the traditional Julian calendar, the fixed commemorations for their respective September 18 are broadly the same, no matter which calendar is used. (Note: Despite the dates being the same, the days to which they refer typically differ by 13 days. The notation Old Style or O.S. is sometimes used to indicate a date in the traditional Julian Calendar (the "Old Calendar"). The notation New Style or N.S. indicates a date in the Revised Julian calendar (the "New Calendar").)

== Feasts ==
- Afterfeast of the Exaltation of the Cross.

== Saints ==
- Martyr Ariadne of Phrygia (c. 117-139) (Note: Name days celebrated today include: Ariadne, Arianna (Ἀριάδνη).)
- Martyrs Sophia and Irene, of Egypt, by the sword (3rd century) (see also: August 28)
- Martyr Castor of Alexandria.
- Venerable Eumenius, Bishop of Gortyna on Crete, Wonderworker (7th century) (Note: "At Gortyna, in Crete, St. Eumenus, bishop and confessor.") (see also: August 25)

== Pre-Schism Western saints ==
- Martyr Ferreolus, an army officer, he was martyred in Vienne in France under Diocletian (3rd century) (Note: "In the diocese of Vienne, the holy martyr Ferreol, a tribune, who was arrested by order of the impious governor Crispinus, most cruelly scourged, then loaded with heavy chains, and cast into a dark dungeon. A miracle having broken his bonds, and opened the doors of the prison, he made his escape, but being taken again by his pursuers, he received the palm of martyrdom by being beheaded.")
- Saint Eustorgius I, Bishop of Milan (c. 331) (Note: A Greek by birth, in 315 he became Bishop of Milan in Italy, where he exerted his influence against the Arians.) (Note: "At Milan, St. Eustorgius, first bishop of that city, highly commended by blessed Ambrose.")
- Saint Ferreolus, fifth Bishop of Limoges in France (c. 591)
- Saint Richardis, Holy Roman Empress as the wife of Charles the Fat, and was the first abbess of Andlau Abbey (c. 895) (Note: Married at the age of twenty-two to the Frankish Emperor Charles the Fat, after nineteen years of married life she was accused of unfaithfulness. Her innocence was established, but she became a nun at the convent of Andlau which she had founded.)

== Post-Schism Orthodox saints ==
- Saint Arcadius, Bishop of Novgorod (1162)
- Venerable Romilus the Sinaite, of Ravanica (1375)
- Martyrs Bidzina, Elizbar, and Shalva, Princes of Ksani, Georgia (1660)
- Venerable Hilarion, Elder, of Optina Monastery (1873)

=== New martyrs and confessors ===
- New Hieromartyrs Alexis Kuznetsov and Peter Dyakonov, Priests (1918)
- New Hieromartyr Amphilochius (Skvortsov), Bishop of Krasnoyarsk (1937) (Note: See: (in Russian) Амфилохий (Скворцов). Википедии. (Russian Wikipedia).)
- New Hieromartyrs John Vasiliev, Boris Bogolepov, Michael Skobelev, Vladimir Chekalov, Benjamin Blagonadezdin, Constantine Tverdyslov, Priests (1937)
- New Martyr Sergius Vedernikov (1937)
- New Hieromartyr Ilarion Felea, Priest, theology professor in Arad (1961)

== Icons ==
- Icon of the Mother of God of Molchensk (1405)
- Icon of the Mother of God "the Healer" (18th century))
- Translation of the Icon of the Mother of God in Triumph to Russia (returned to Staraya Russa in 1888) (Note: See: (in Russian) Старорусская икона Божией Матери. Википедии. (Russian Wikipedia).) (see also: May 4)

== Other commemorations ==
- Glorification (1698) of Venerable Euphrosyne, nun, of Suzdal (1250)
- Repose of Blessed Irene of Zelenogorsk Monastery (Green Hill Monastery) (18th century)

== Icon gallery ==
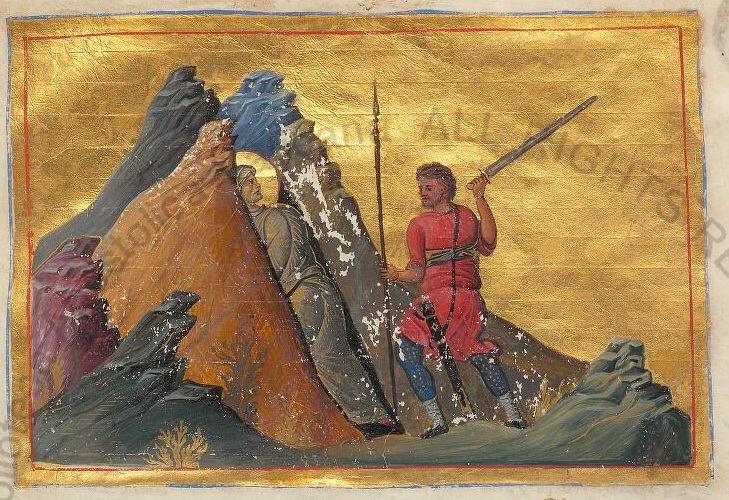
St. Ariadne of Phrygia.
(Menologion of Basil II, 10th century).

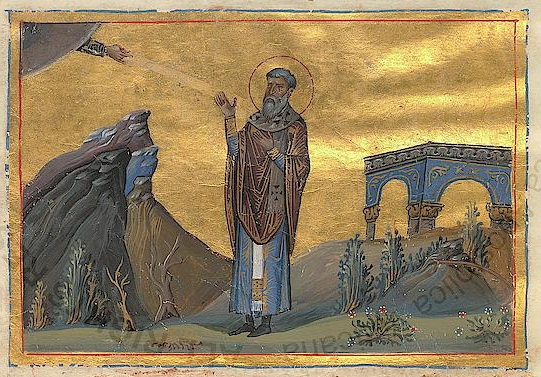
St. Eumenius, Bishop of Gortyna.
(Menologion of Basil II, 10th century).

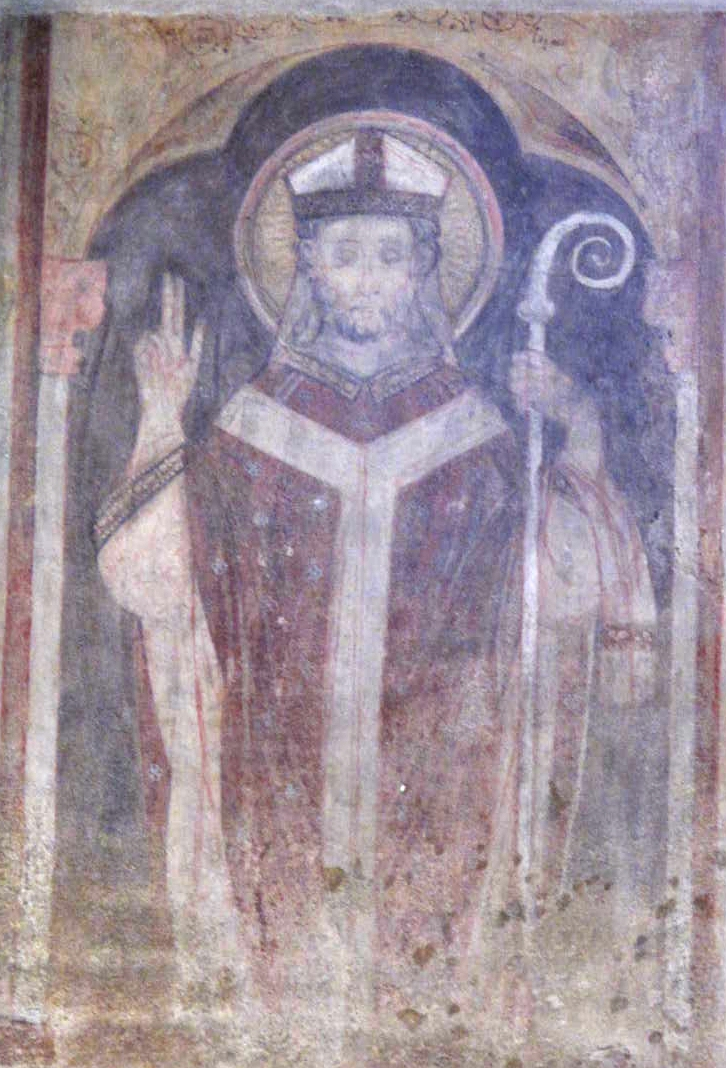
St. Eustorgius of Milan.

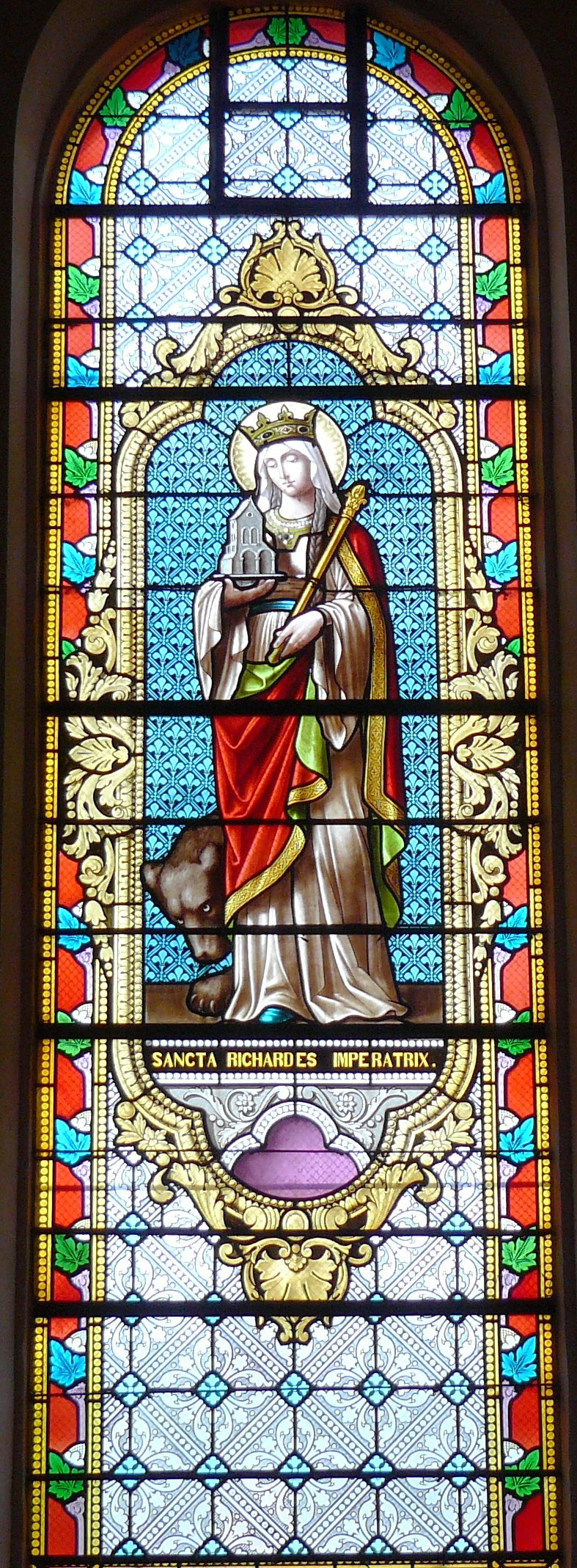
St. Richardis, Holy Roman Empress and first abbess of Andlau Abbey.

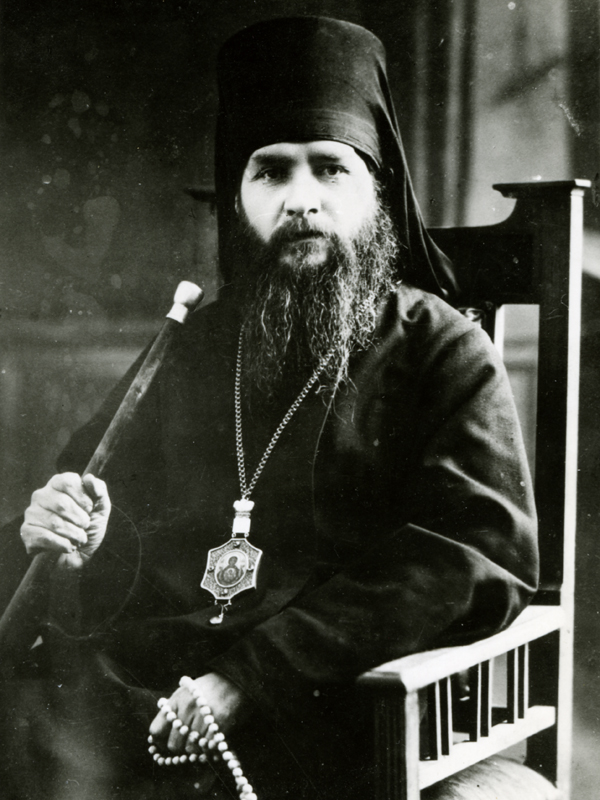
New Hieromartyr Amphilochius (Skvortsov), Bishop of Krasnoyarsk.

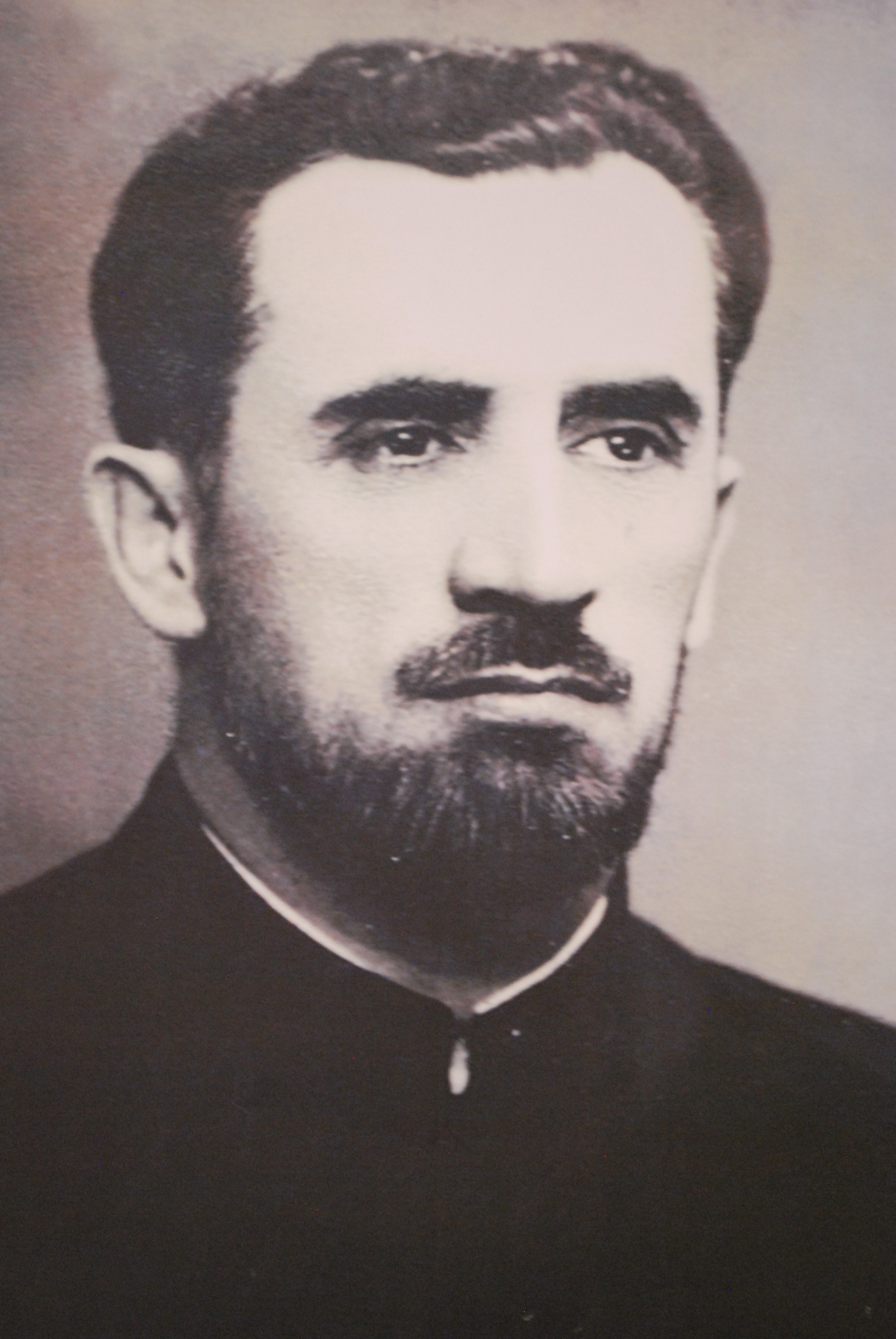
New Hieromartyr Ilarion Felea.

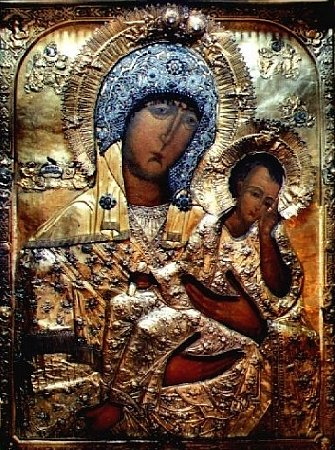
The Starorussk Icon of the Mother of God.

== Sources ==
- September 18/October 1. Orthodox Calendar (PRAVOSLAVIE.RU).
- October 1 / September 18. HOLY TRINITY RUSSIAN ORTHODOX CHURCH (A parish of the Patriarchate of Moscow).
- September 18. OCA - The Lives of the Saints.
- The Autonomous Orthodox Metropolia of Western Europe and the Americas (ROCOR). St. Hilarion Calendar of Saints for the year of our Lord 2004. St. Hilarion Press (Austin, TX). p. 70.
- The Eighteenth Day of the Month of September. Orthodoxy in China.
- September 18. Latin Saints of the Orthodox Patriarchate of Rome.
- The Roman Martyrology. Transl. by the Archbishop of Baltimore. Last Edition, According to the Copy Printed at Rome in 1914. Revised Edition, with the Imprimatur of His Eminence Cardinal Gibbons. Baltimore: John Murphy Company, 1916. p. 288.
- Rev. Richard Stanton. A Menology of England and Wales, or, Brief Memorials of the Ancient British and English Saints Arranged According to the Calendar, Together with the Martyrs of the 16th and 17th Centuries. London: Burns & Oates, 1892. pp. 451–452.

Greek Sources

- Great Synaxaristes: (in Greek) 18 ΣΕΠΤΕΜΒΡΙΟΥ. ΜΕΓΑΣ ΣΥΝΑΞΑΡΙΣΤΗΣ.
- (in Greek) Συναξαριστής. 18 Σεπτεμβρίου. ECCLESIA.GR. (H ΕΚΚΛΗΣΙΑ ΤΗΣ ΕΛΛΑΔΟΣ).
- (in Greek) 18/09/2026. Ορθόδοξος Συναξαριστής.

Russian Sources

- (in Russian) 1 октября (18 сентября). Православная Энциклопедия под редакцией Патриарха Московского и всея Руси Кирилла (электронная версия). (Orthodox Encyclopedia - Pravenc.ru).
- (in Russian) 18 сентября по старому стилю / 1 октября по новому стилю. Русская Православная Церковь - Православный церковный календарь на 2026 год.
