= Agioi Deka =

Agioi Deka Άγιοι Δέκα
- Community
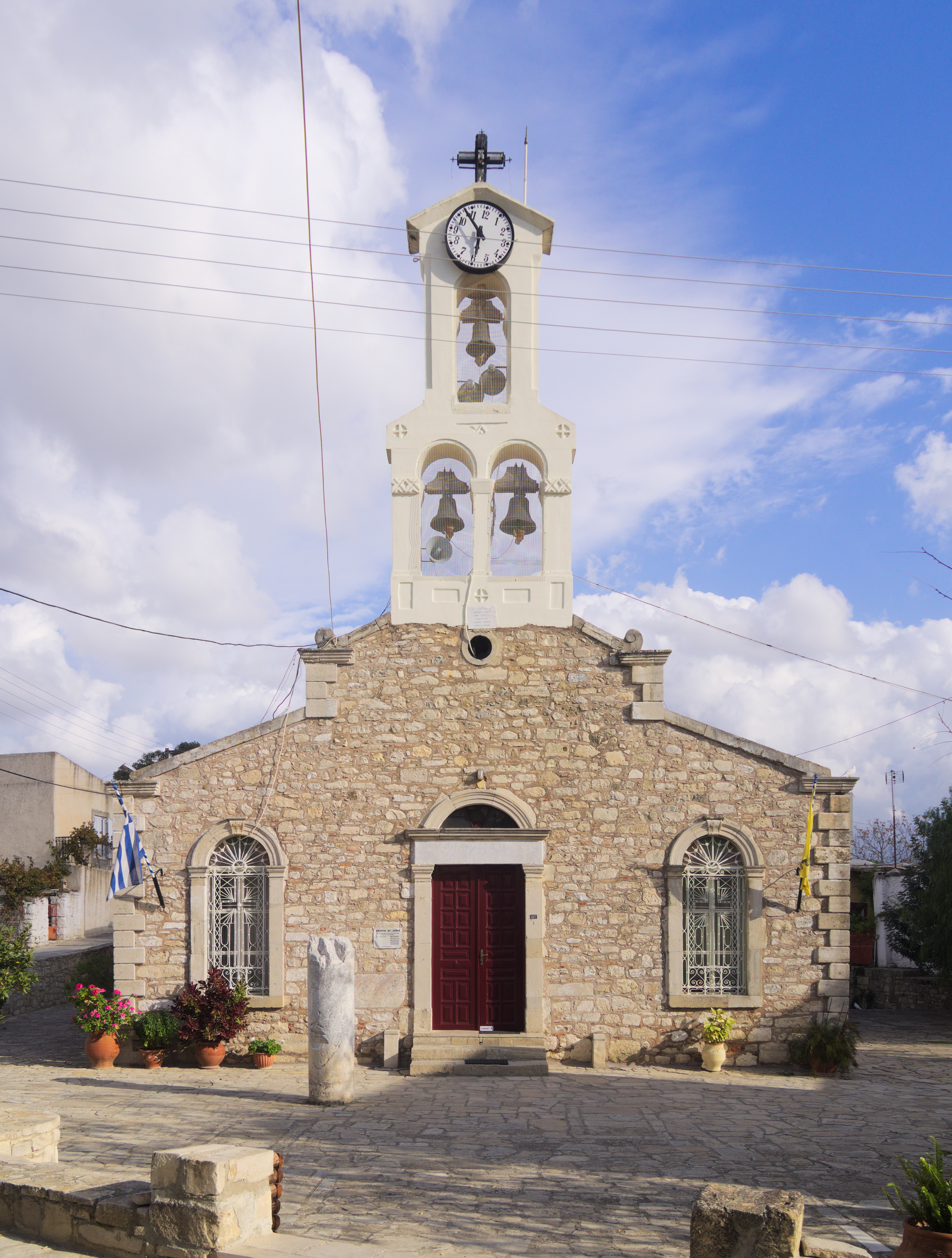
- The church of Ten Saints

- Location within Greece
- Coordinates: 35°03′N 24°57′E
- Country: Greece
- Administrative region: Crete
- Regional unit: Heraklion
- Municipality: Gortyna

Population (2021)
  - Community: 785
- Time zone: UTC+2 (EET)
  - Summer (DST): UTC+3 (EEST)
- Postal code: 70012
- Area code: 28920
- Vehicle registration: HK, HP

Agioi Deka (Greek: Άγιοι Δέκα, "Holy Ten") is a village in the Heraklion regional unit, Greece, with 785 inhabitants (2021 census). It is located in the 44th km of the Heraklion-Tympaki national road and it is the centre of the municipality of Gortyna (Δήμος Γόρτυνας).

The village is built on the feet of a green hill with view to the plain of Messara, at altitude of 170 meters, over the remains of ancient Gortys. It is supposed that the cemetery of Gortys was located in this area, and many of the old houses are built using recycled material from the ruins of Gortys. There is a local archaeological museum containing finds from the area. Other archaeological remains include the Praetorium located between Agioi Deka and Gortys, the tombs of Agioi Deka and the old church in the centre of the old village.

== Name ==
The name of the village means Ten Saints, referring to the ten Martyrs of Crete (Agathopus, Basilides, Gelasius, Evaristus, Eunician, Euporus, Zoticus, Theodulus, Saturninus, and either Cleomenes or Mobius or Pompeius) who martyred there in 250 AD during the religious persecutions of the Roman emperor Decius. At the site of their martyrdom stands a 12th-century church.
