= List of archbishops of Crete =

Archbishop of Crete
- Archbishopric

Orthodox
- Incumbent: Eugenios II (Antonopoulos) since 11 January 2022

Location
- Country: Greece
- Territory: Island of Crete

Information
- First holder: Apostle Titus
- Formation: 64
- Denomination: Eastern Orthodox
- Sui iuris church: Greek Orthodox Church (current)
- Cathedral: Agios Minas Cathedral
- Language: Koine Greek
- Calendar: Revised Julian

Current leadership
- Pope: Leo XIV
- Patriarch: Bartholomew I of Constantinople

Website
- iak.gr (in Greek)

This is a list of archbishops of Crete. The Church of Crete was created by St Titus in 64 AD. Being made Bishop of Crete by St Paul himself, Titus later chose other bishops to rule the Church outside Gortyn, dividing the island into dioceses and thus becoming Archbishop of Crete. Later, the See was transferred to Heraklion, where it stands today.

== First Roman period ==
- Saint Titus 55/64 - 105 ?
- Saint Artemas
- Saint Philip (160/170 – 180/192)
- Dioscorus
- Cresces (fl. 256)
- Saint Cyril (d. 304?)
- Saint Myron (d. 350?)
- Saint Peter
- Paul I
- Iconius (fl. 431)
- Martyrius (fl. 449–457/8)
- (Menas, 5th–8th century, known from a seal)
- (Synesius, 5th–6th century, known from a seal)
- Theodore (fl. 536–553)
- John I (fl. 597–599)
- (Ecclesiodorus, 6th–7th century, known from an inscription)
- Paul II (fl. 655–667/8)
- Saint Eumenius (667/8–680)
- Basil I (fl. 680–692)
- (Stephen, early 8th century, known from a seal)
- Saint Andrew (711–740)
- (George, 8th century, known from a seal)
- Elias I (fl. 787)

== Arab period ==
- Basil II (before 858), transferred to Thessaloniki
- Basil III (fl. 879), possibly successor of prec.
- John II (fl. 961?)

== Second Roman (Byzantine) period ==
- (John, successor of prec.)
- Stephen II (fl. in 1027–1030)
- Niketas I, successor of prec.
- Niketas II, successor of prec.
- Basil, successor of prec.
- Niketas III, successor of prec.
- John III (before 1084 – at least 1089), successor of prec.
- Leo, successor of prec.
- Michael (late 11th century), successor of prec.
- Constantine I (11th–12th century), successor of prec.
- Elias III (fl. 1120?), successor of prec.
- Basil IV, successor of prec.
- Constantine II, successor of prec.
- Nicholas, successor of prec.
- John (fl. 1166–1172), successor of prec.
- Manuel Limas, successor of prec.
- Manuel, successor of prec.
- Nicholas I (1195–1204)

== Venetian period ==
- John IV (?)
- Manuel I (?)
- Manuel II (?)
- Nicholas II (?)
- Nikephoros I Moschopoulos (1285–1322)
- Makarios (c.1357)
- Anthimos the Confessor (c.1371)
- Ignatios (c.1381)
- Prochoros (c.1410)
- Paisios (c.1439)
- Belisarios (c.1499)

== Ottoman period ==
- Neophytos Patellaros (1646–1679)
- Nikephoros II Skotakis (1679–1683)
- Kallinikos I (1683–1685?)
- Arsenios I (1687–1688)
- Athanasios Kallipolitis (1688–1697)
- Kallinikos II (1697–1702)
- Arsenios II (1702–1704)
- Ioasaph (1704–1711)
- Constantine III (1711–1716)
- Gerasimos I (1716–1718)
- Constantine III (7 December 1718–1722), again
- Daniel (1722–1725)
- Gerasimos II (1725–2 January 1756)
- (Anthimos II 2 January 1756–6 February 1756)
- Gerasimos III (6 February 1756–July 1769)
- Zacharias (July 1769–May 1786)
- Maximos (19 May 1786–4 May 1800)
- Gerasimos IV (1800–6 July 1821)
- Methodios (1823)
- Kallinikos III (March/April 1823–1830)
- Meletios I (January/February 1831–1839)
- Porphyrios (August/September 1839–21 September 1839)
- Kallinikos IV (September/October 1839–24 February 1842)
- Kallinikos V (13 March 1842–1843)
- Chrysanthos (December 1843/January 1844–5 September 1850)
- Sophronios I (5 September 1850–December 1850/January 1851)
- Dionysios I (December 1850/January 1851–9 September 1856)
- Ioannikios (9 September 1856–1858)
- Dionysios II (7 August 1858–28 November 1868)
- Meletios II (28 November 1868–5 December 1874)
- Sophronios II (5 December 1874–21 June 1877)
- Meletios II (21 June 1877–25 August 1882), again
- Timotheos I (2 October 1882–2 March 1897)

== Greek period ==
- Evmenios II (24 May 1898–14 April 1920)
- Titos II (7 March 1922–25 April 1933)
- Timotheos II (22 July 1933–January 1941)
- Vasilios V (8 April 1941–January 1950)
- Evgenios (23 May 1950–7 February 1978), from 28 February 1967 archbishop, no longer metropolitan
- Timotheos III Papoutsakis (10 March 1978–26 July 2006)
- Irinaios Athanasiadis (30 August 2006–11 January 2022)
- Eugenios II (11 January 2022- present)

== Bibliography ==
- Kiminas, Demetrius (2009). The Ecumenical Patriarchate: A History of Its Metropolitanates with Annotated Hierarch Catalogs. Wildside Press LLC. ISBN 9781434458766.
- Tsougarakis, Dimitris (1988). Byzantine Crete: From the 5th Century to the Venetian Conquest. Athens: Historical Publications St. D. Basilopoulos.
