= Philip of Gortyna =

Saint Philip of Gortyna

Apologist and Bishop of Gortyna
- Died: 180
- Venerated in: Eastern Orthodox Church; Roman Catholic Church
- Canonized: pre-congregation
- Feast: 11 April; 8 October (Church of Crete)

Saint Philip of Gortyna (Greek: Φίλιππος; died 180) was Bishop of Gortyna on Crete. Little is known about him except for his authorship of a now lost treatise against the Gnostics. An early Christian Apologist, he wrote in the time of Marcus Aurelius against Marcion. He was mentioned with great praise by Dionysius of Corinth in one of his letters to the Christian Community in Gortyna. He is generally commemorated with a feast day on 11 April, however in the Church of Crete his feast day is on 8 October.

== Bibliography ==
- Eusebius, Hist. eccl., IV., xxiii. 5; Eng. transl., NPNF, 2 ser., i. 201
- New Schaff-Herzog Encyclopedia of Religious Knowledge, Vol. IX: Petri – Reuchlin
