= Saint Eumenes =

Eumenes
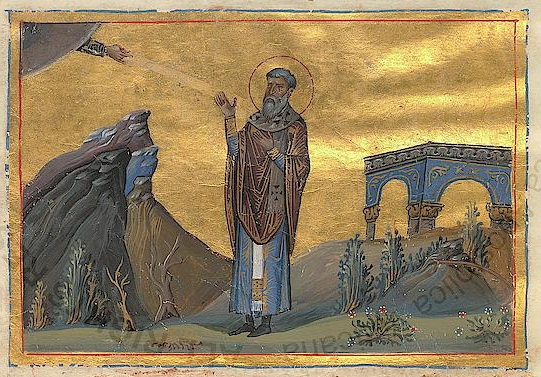

Archbishop of Crete
- Born: 3rd-7th Century
- Residence: Crete
- Died: Thebaid
- Feast: 18 September
- Major works: Killed a venomous snake, drove out demons, and healed the sick

Saint Eumenes (or Eumenius) (Greek: Άγιος Εύμένης) was a bishop of Gortyna in Crete during the 7th century (some sources say 3rd century). His feast day is 18 September. He gave up his wealth as a young man and was chosen as bishop of Gortyna. Many miracles are attributed to him: he killed a venomous snake, drove out demons, and healed the sick. He is said to have performed miracles at Gortyna, Rome, and in the Thebaid. He died in exile in the Thebaid.
