= Agios Minas Cathedral =

Greek cathedral in Heraklion, Crete, Greece

- ῾Ιερός Μητροπολιτικός Ναός ῾Αγίου Μηνᾶ
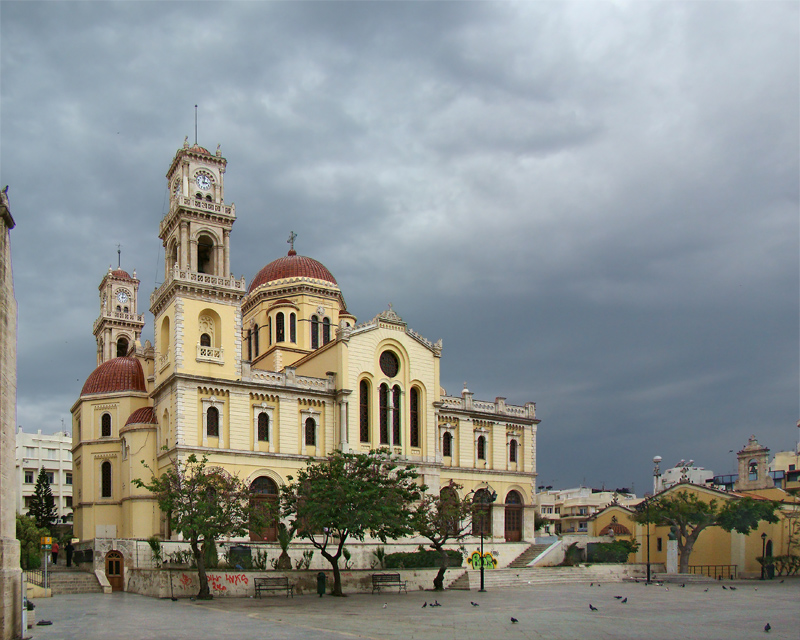

- Location of the cathedral on Crete
- Agios Minas Cathedral
- 35°20′15″N 25°07′51″E
- Location: Heraklion, Crete
- Country: Greece
- Language: Greek
- Denomination: Greek Orthodox

History
- Status: Cathedral
- Dedication: Saint Menas

Architecture
- Architect: Athanasios Mousis
- Architectural type: Basilica
- Groundbreaking: 1862
- Completed: 1895

Specifications
- Length: 43 m (141 ft)
- Width: 29.5 m (97 ft)
- Materials: Stone; marble; timber

Administration
- Archdiocese: Crete

Clergy
- Archbishop: Eugenios II (Antonopoulos)

The Agios Minas Cathedral (Greek: ῾Ιερός Μητροπολιτικός Ναός ῾Αγίου Μηνᾶ, lit. 'Saint Menas' Cathedral') is a Greek Orthodox cathedral in Heraklion, on the island of Crete, Greece, serving as the seat of the Archbishop of Crete. Ιt is dedicated to Saint Menas, the martyr and wonderworker (285-309 A.D.), who is the patron saint of Heraklion.

== History ==
Prior to its construction, the small church of Agios Minas, erected in 1735, did not meet the religious needs of the growing Christian community. The small and old church, within close proximity of the cathedral, remains extant, referred to by locals as the little Agios Minas.

The site chosen for the construction of the cathedral was a garden that was purchased from a Turk. Designed by Athanasios Moussis, the foundation stone was laid in 1862. The construction was interrupted during the Cretan Revolution of 1866–1869, was resumed in 1883, and completed in 1895.

== Architecture ==
The cathedral has a cruciform structure with a central dome based on a high spandrel, while internally there are also elements of a three-aisle basilica. It has two bell towers, one each in the northeastern and southeastern corners. The exterior floor plan of the cathedral is 43.2 metres (142 ft) long and 29.5 metres (97 ft) wide, with an interior area of 1,350 square metres (14,500 sq ft).

The right aisle is dedicated to Apostle Titos and the left aisle to the Ten Martyrs of Crete. The inside of the church has gone through many changes with new additions. With plans of the architect Anastasios Orlandos the woodcut icon screen was replaced by another one made of marble, the same happened with the bishop's seat. The religious painting of the church was assigned to Saint Kartakis, who followed the principles of Byzantine iconography.

It is the largest cathedral in Crete and one of the largest in Greece.

== Gallery ==
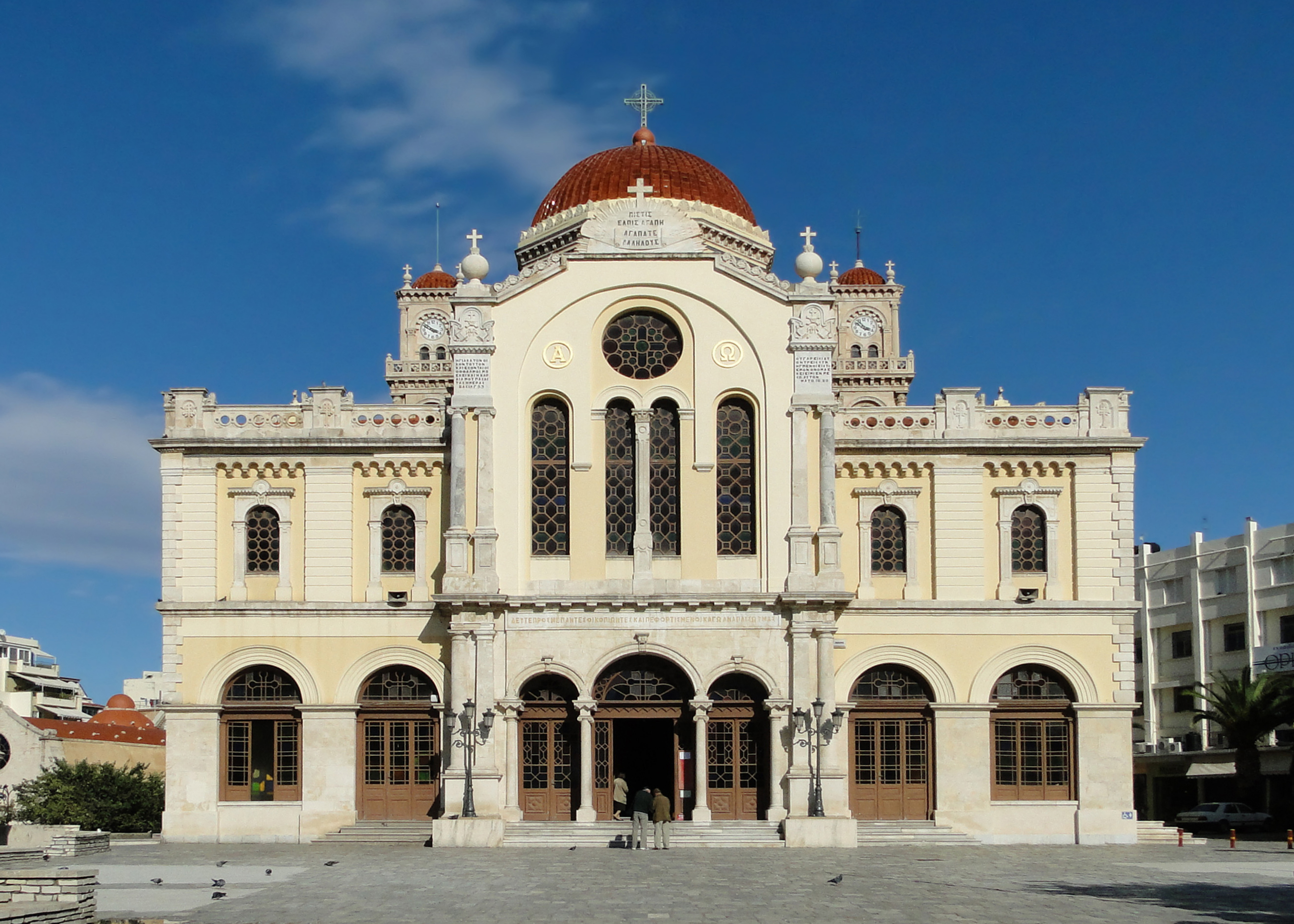
Front view of the cathedral

The south-west facade with tower and dome

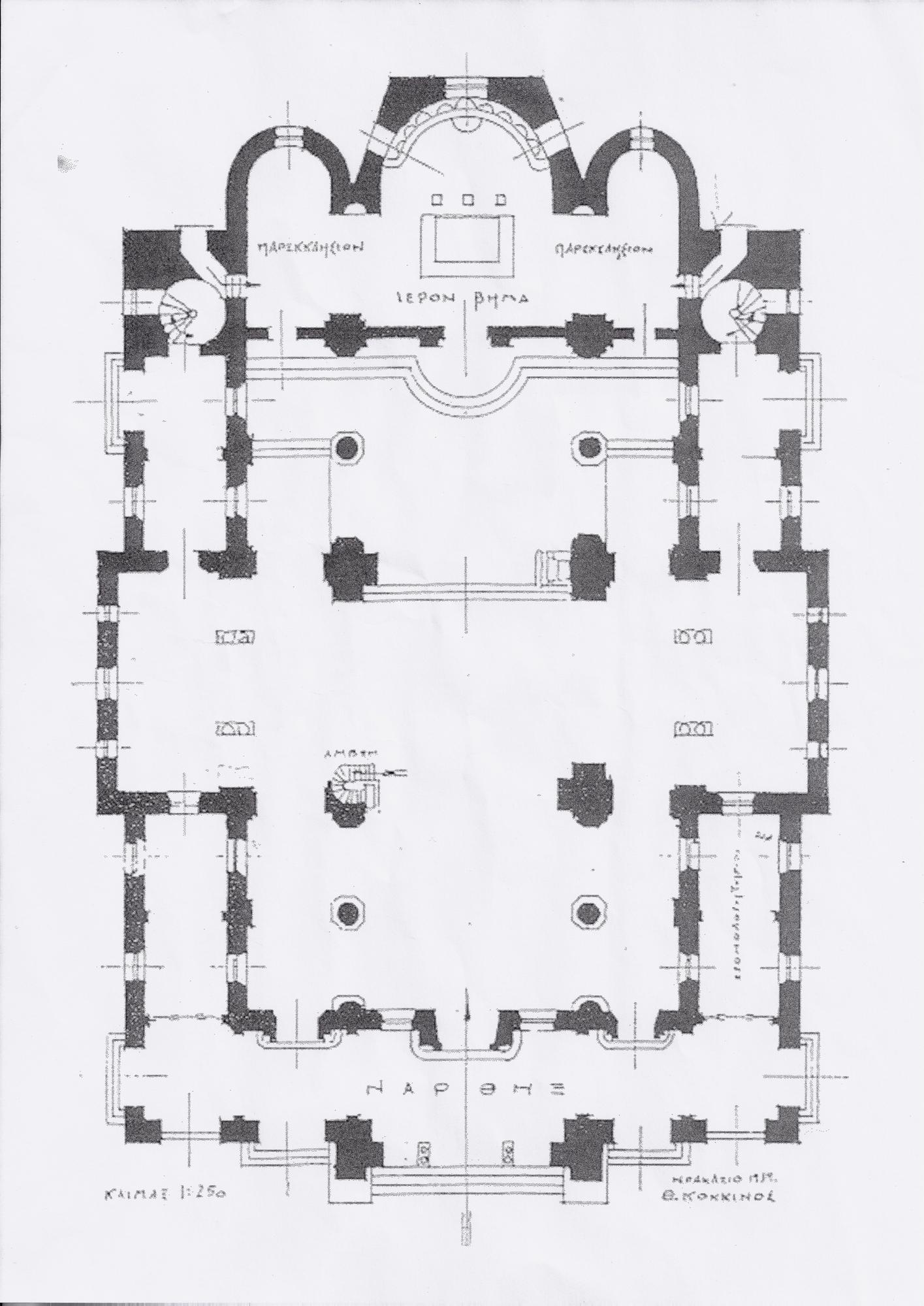
The cathedral floor plan

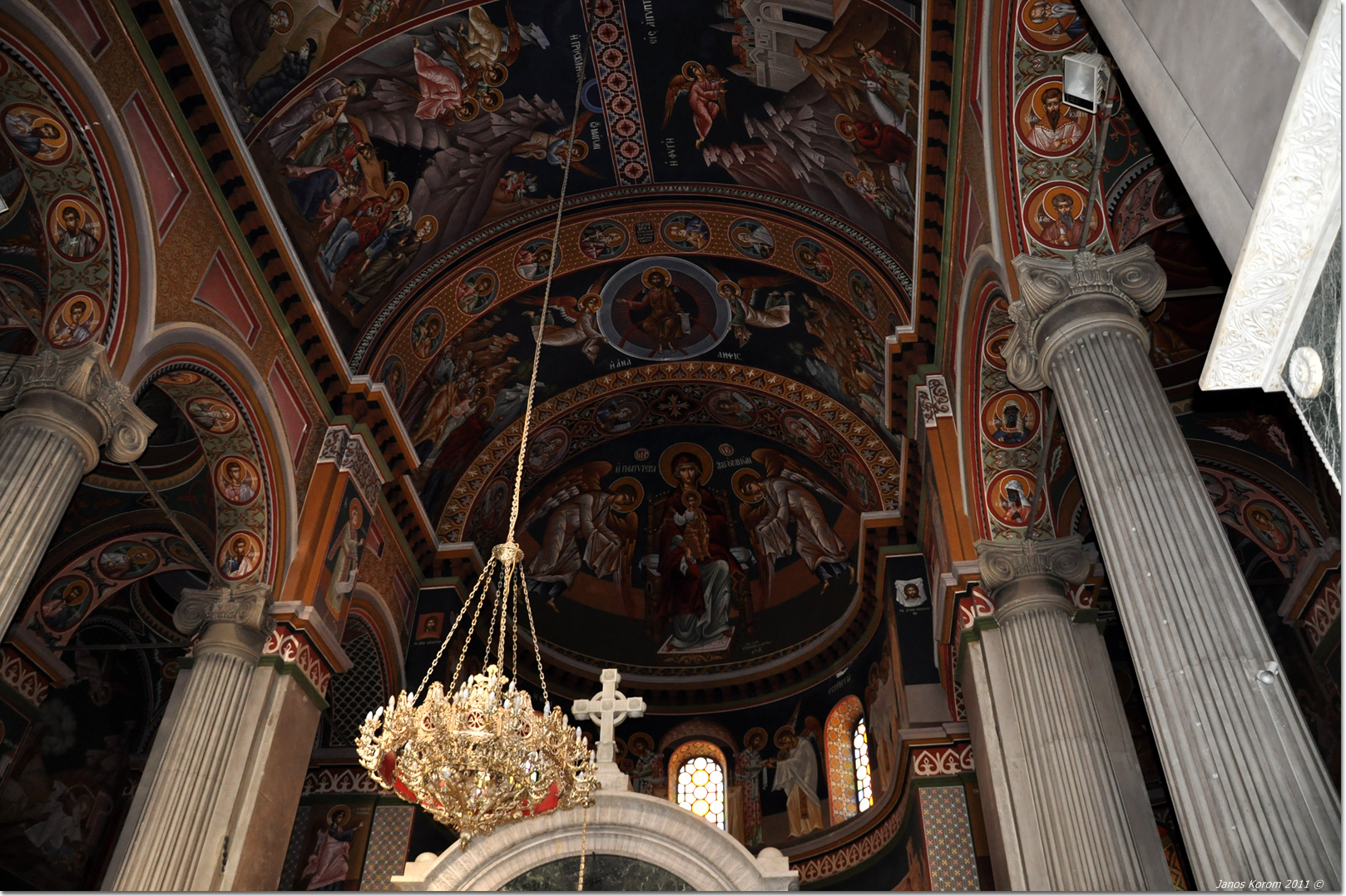
Interior view of the cathedral

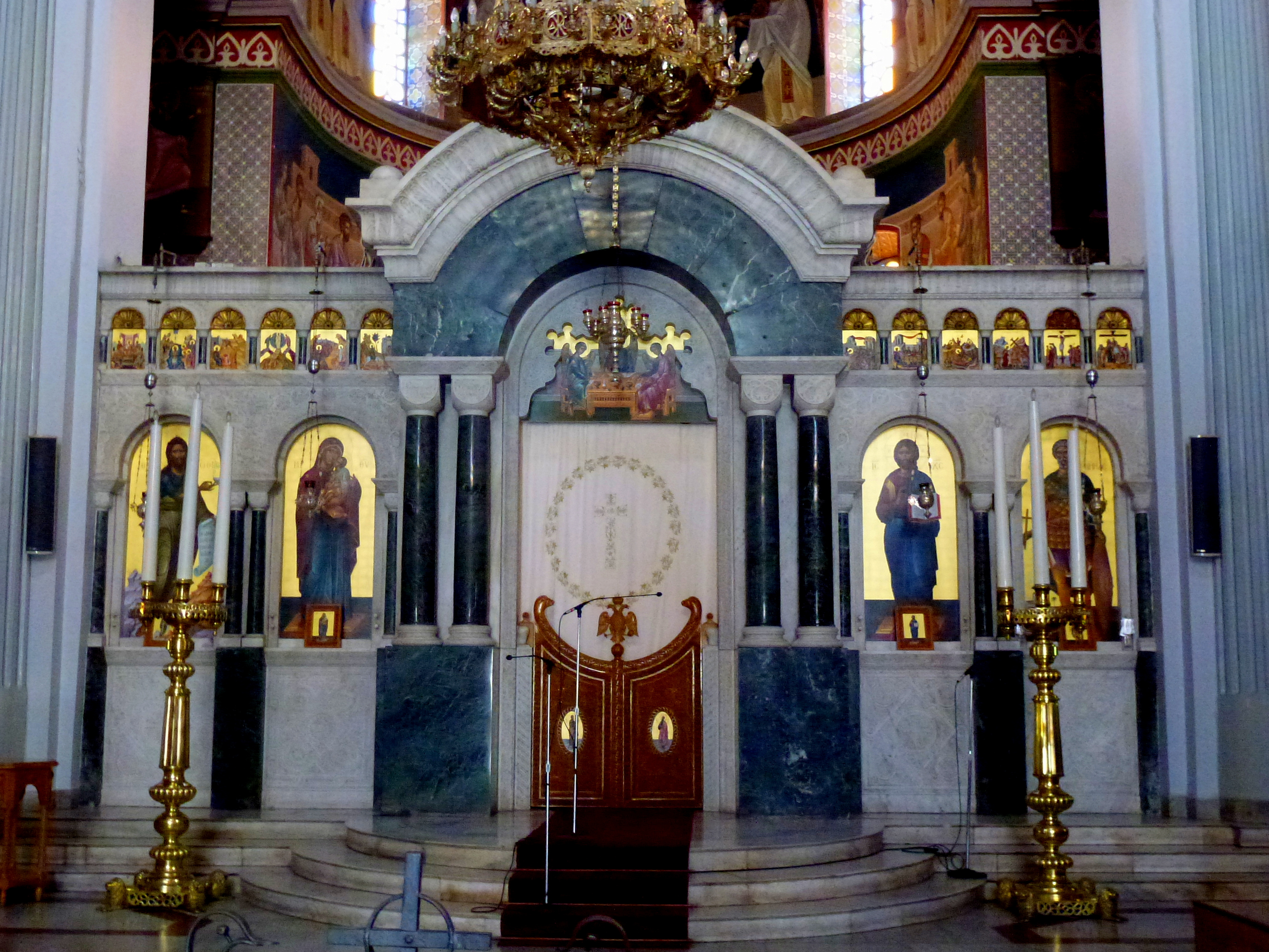
A view of the templon

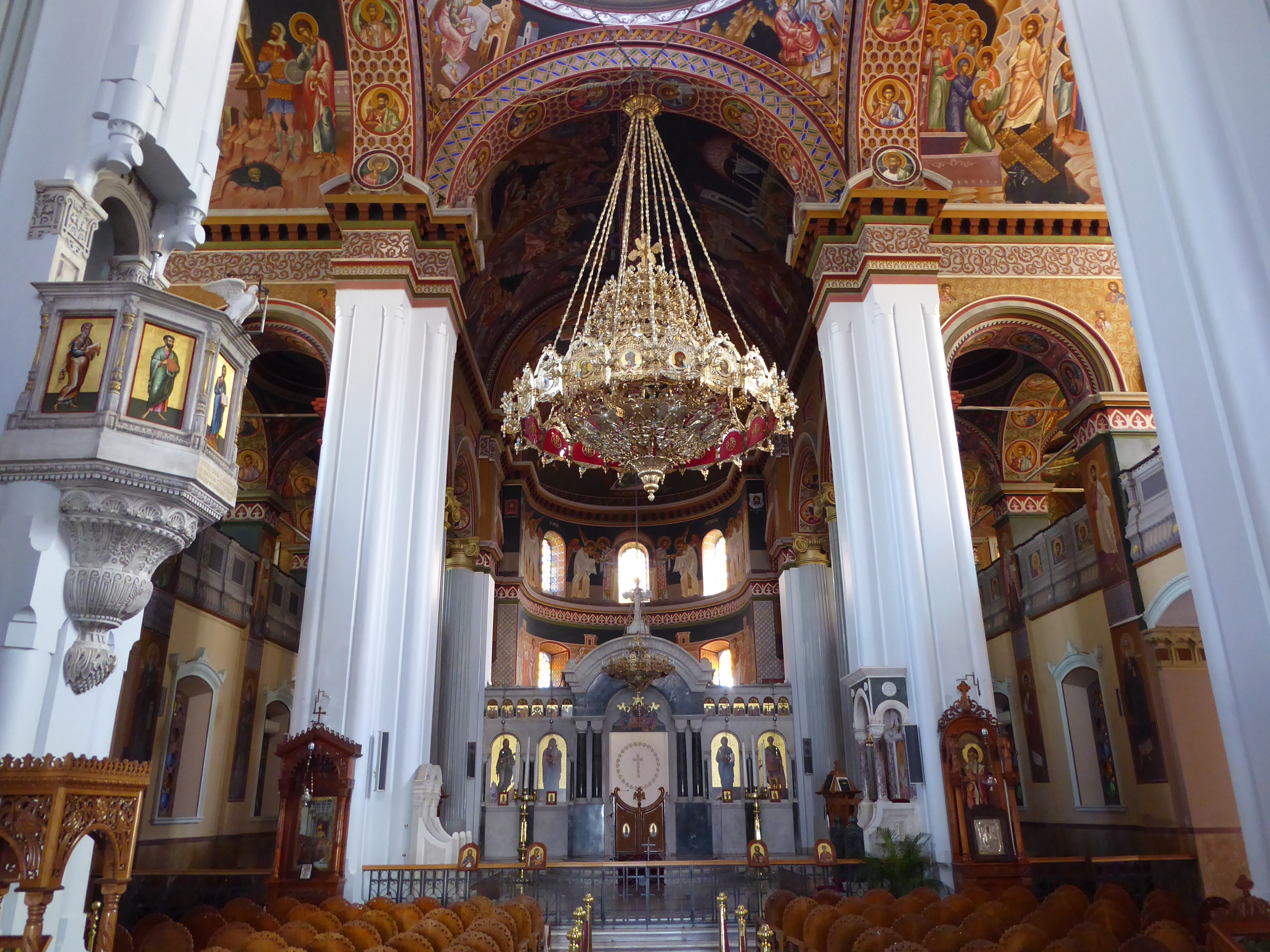
Interior view of the cathedral

Interior dome fresco of Christ Pantocrator

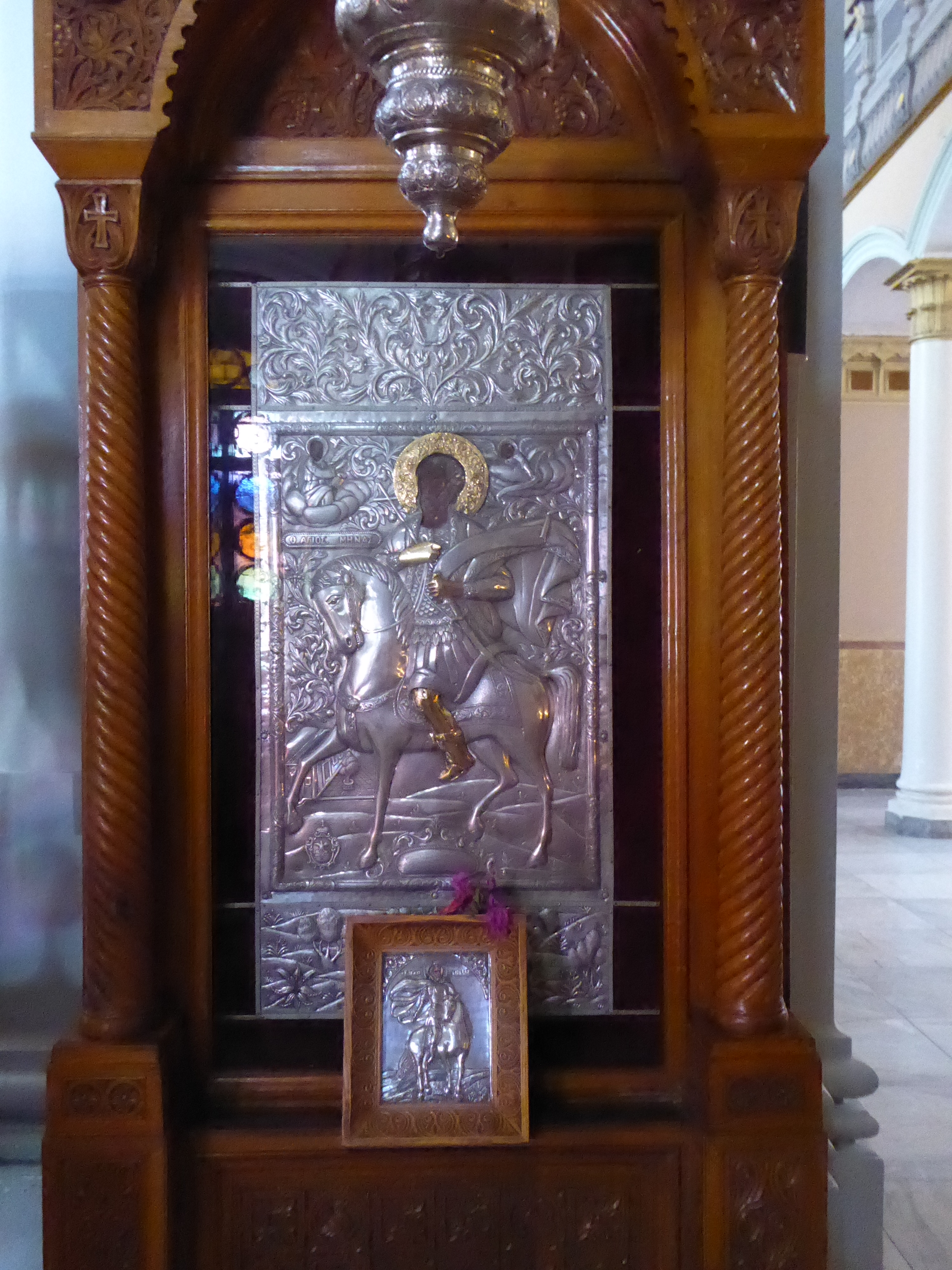
Icon of Saint Menas

== See also ==
- Church of Crete
- List of largest Eastern Orthodox church buildings
- Ottoman Crete
