= Church of Crete =

Semi-autonomous Eastern Orthodox Church on Crete in Greece

Coordinates: 35°20′15″N 25°07′51″E

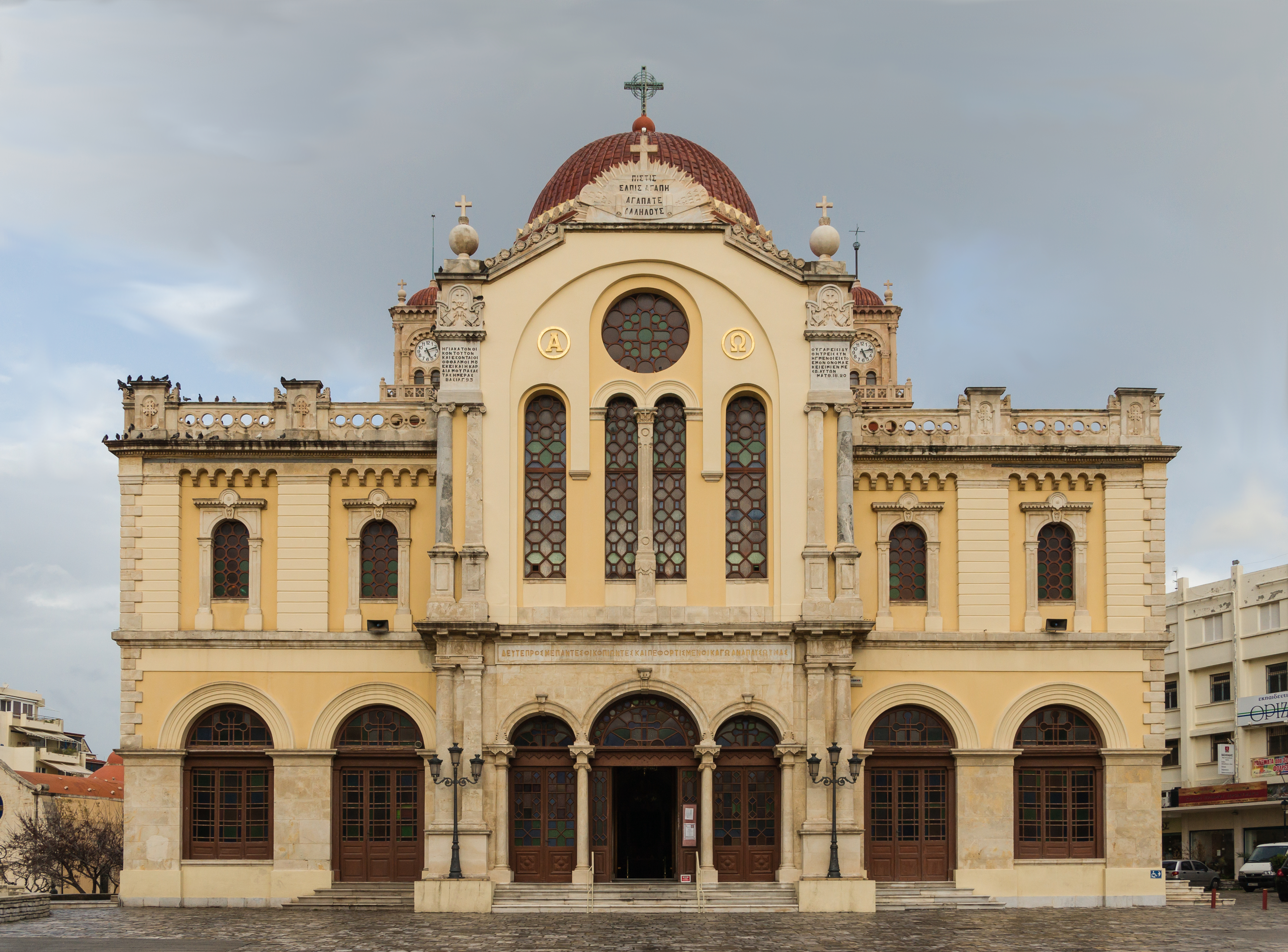
- The Agios Minas Cathedral, see of the Archbishop of Crete
- Language: Greek
- Headquarters: Crete, Greece
- Territory: Crete
- Possessions: Crete

The Church of Crete (Greek: Εκκλησία της Κρήτης) is an Eastern Orthodox church, comprising the island of Crete in Greece. The Church of Crete is semi-autonomous (self-governing) under the jurisdiction of the Ecumenical Patriarchate of Constantinople. The current archbishop of Crete is Eugenios II.

== Overview ==
The Church of Crete has been self-governing since late Ottoman times. The charter of the church was recognized by law (Law 4149/1961) by the Greek state in 1961, some 50 years after the island's incorporation into Greece. In 1962, the Ecumenical Patriarchate elevated the island's bishoprics to metropolises, and in 1967, the Metropolitan of Crete was promoted to Archbishop. The patriarchate nominates the island's presiding bishop from a list of three Cretan bishops prepared by the Greek Ministry of National Education and Religious Affairs, but the church's affairs, including the nomination of the other bishops, are otherwise handled by the Holy Provincial Synod of Crete. The link with the Patriarchate ensures less opposition to ecumenism than generally expressed in the mainland Church of Greece.

The Church of Crete is composed of:

- the Archbishopric of Crete, based at Heraklion
- the Metropolis of Gortyn and Arkadia, based at Moires
- the Metropolis of Rethymno and Mylopotamos, based at Rethymno
- the Metropolis of Kydonia and Apokoronas, based at Chania
- the Metropolis of Lampi, Syvritos and Sfakia, based at Spili
- the Metropolis of Hierapytna and Siteia, based at Ierapetra
- the Metropolis of Petra and Hersonissos, based at Neapoli
- the Metropolis of Kissamos and Selino, based at Kastelli Kissamou
- the Metropolis of Arkalochori, Kastelli and Viannos, based at Arkalochori.

== See also ==
- List of Archbishops of Crete

== Bibliography ==
- Kiminas, Demetrius (2009). The Ecumenical Patriarchate: A History of Its Metropolitanates with Annotated Hierarch Catalogs. Wildside Press LLC. ISBN 978-1-4344-5876-6.
