= Matalia =

Coordinates: 34°59′44″N 24°45′00″E

Matalia (Ancient Greek: Ματαλία) was a town of ancient Crete near the headland of Matala (Μάταλα), and probably the same place as the port and naval arsenal of Gortyna called Metallum or Metallon (Μέταλλον) by Strabo.

Its site is located near modern Matala.
