= Gortyn =

Gortyn Γόρτυνα
- Municipality
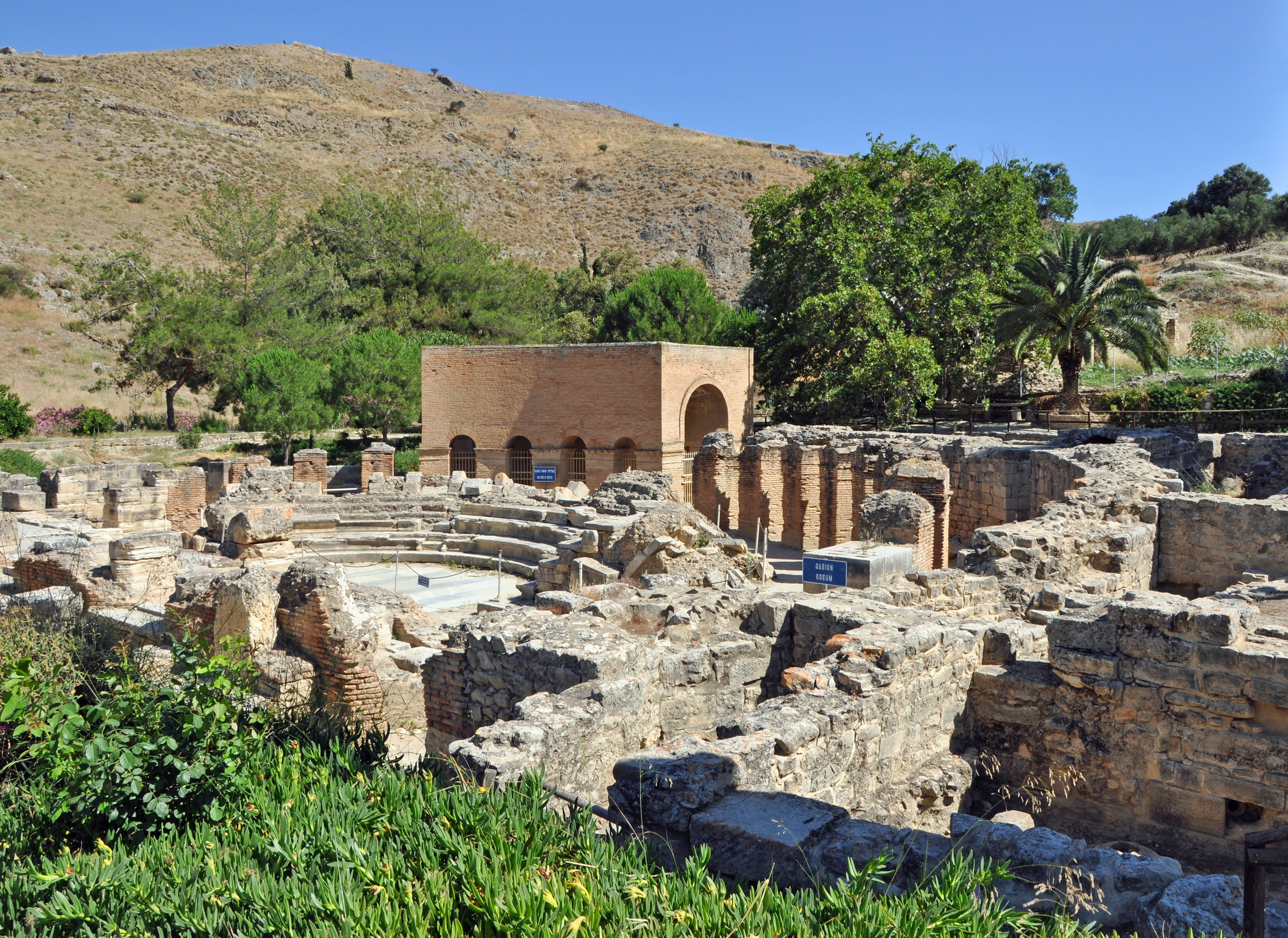

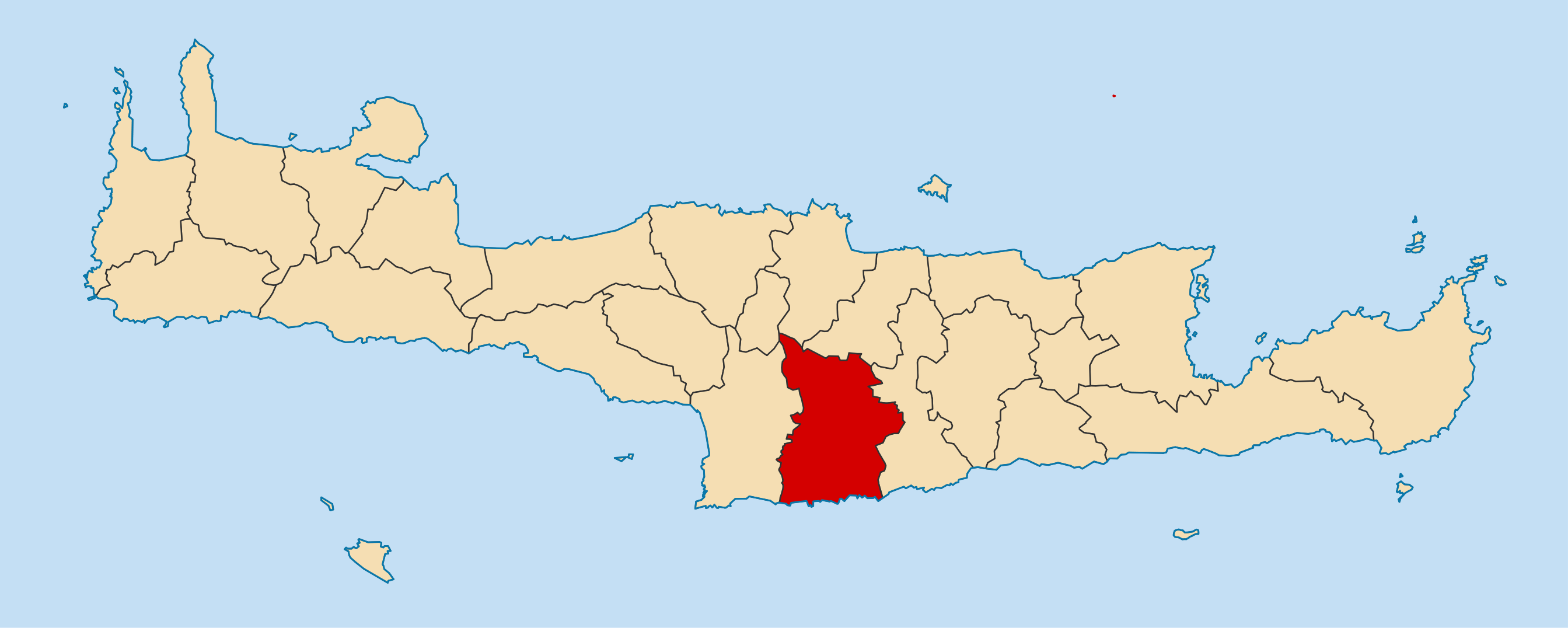

- Location within Greece
- Coordinates: 35°03′47″N 24°56′49″E
- Country: Greece
- Administrative region: Crete
- Regional unit: Heraklion
- Seat: Agioi Deka

Area
  - Municipality: 464.8 km^{2} (179.5 sq mi)
  - Municipal unit: 158.3 km^{2} (61.1 sq mi)

Population (2021)
  - Municipality: 14,167
  - Density: 30.48/km^{2} (78.94/sq mi)
  - Municipal unit: 4,137
  - Municipal unit density: 26.13/km^{2} (67.69/sq mi)
- Time zone: UTC+2 (EET)
  - Summer (DST): UTC+3 (EEST)

Gortyn, Gortys or Gortyna (Greek: Γόρτυν, Γόρτυς, or Γόρτυνα, pronounced [ˈɣortina]) is a municipality, and an archaeological site, on the Mediterranean island of Crete 45 km (28 mi) away from the island's capital, Heraklion. The seat of the municipality is the village Agioi Deka. Gortyn was the Roman capital of Creta et Cyrenaica. The area was first inhabited around 7000 BC.

It is located in the valley of Messara in the south of the Psiloritis mountain, in the current position of the settlements of Metropolis and Agioi Deka, and near the Libyan Sea.

== Municipality ==
The municipality Gortyna was formed as part of Greece's 2011 local government reform by merging the following four former municipalities, each of which became municipal units:

- Agia Varvara
- Gortyna
- Kofinas
- Rouvas

The municipality has an area of 464.841 km^{2} (179 sq mi), the municipal unit 158.310 km^{2} (61 sq mi).

== Geography ==
=== Climate ===
Climate data for Gortyn, Greece
Month	Jan	Feb	Mar	Apr	May	Jun	Jul	Aug	Sep	Oct	Nov	Dec	Year
Mean daily maximum °C (°F)	15.0 (59.0)	15.10 (59.18)	16.5 (61.7)	20.0 (68.0)	23.40 (74.12)	27.10 (80.78)	28.5 (83.3)	28.20 (82.76)	26.40 (79.52)	23.40 (74.12)	19.60 (67.28)	16.60 (61.88)	21.65 (70.97)
Mean daily minimum °C (°F)	9.10 (48.38)	9.0 (48.2)	9.60 (49.28)	12.10 (53.78)	15.30 (59.54)	19.20 (66.56)	21.90 (71.42)	22.0 (71.6)	19.60 (67.28)	16.70 (62.06)	13.40 (56.12)	10.70 (51.26)	14.88 (58.79)

== History ==
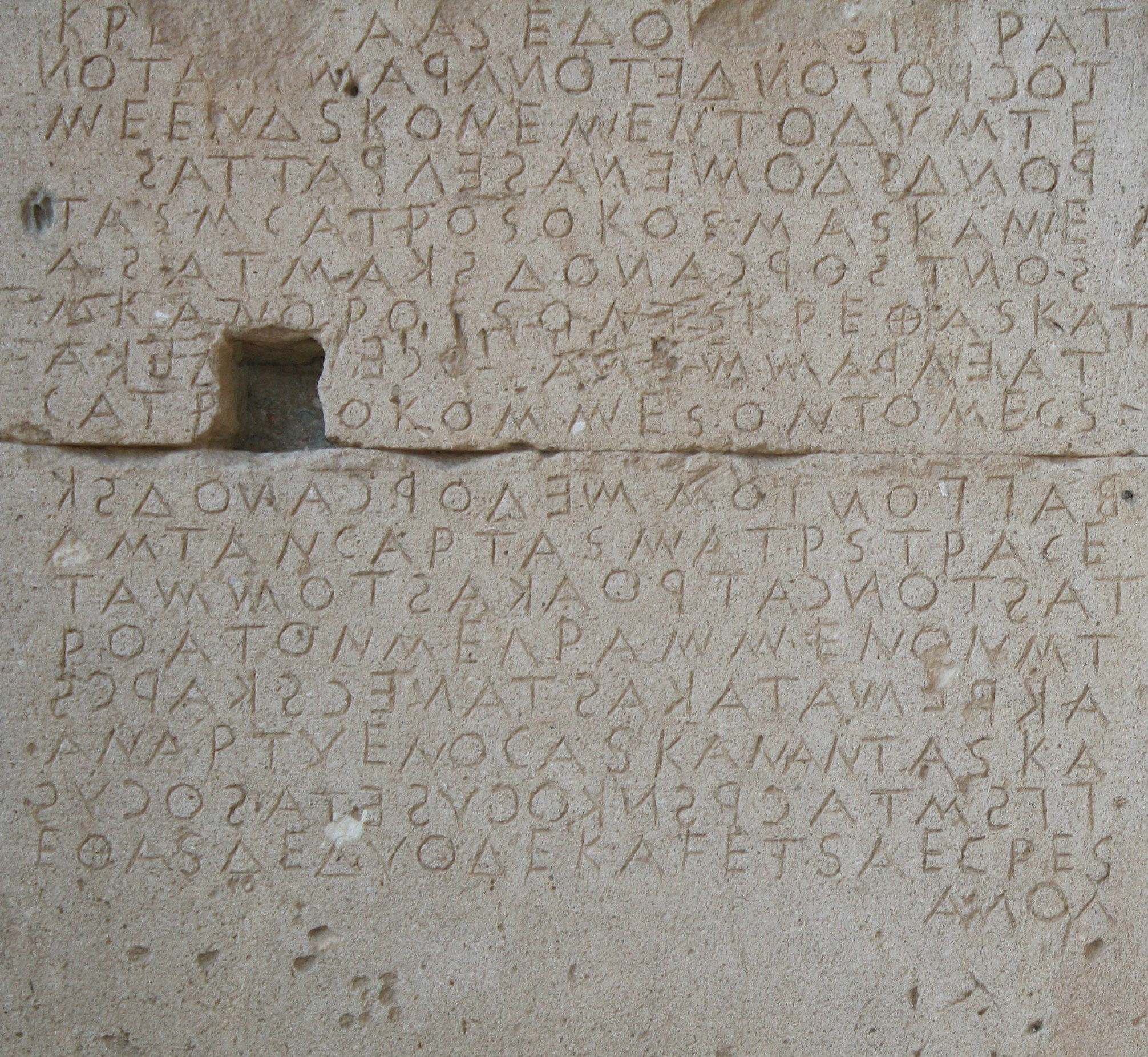
Fragmentary boustrophedon inscription (code of law) in the agora of Gortyn

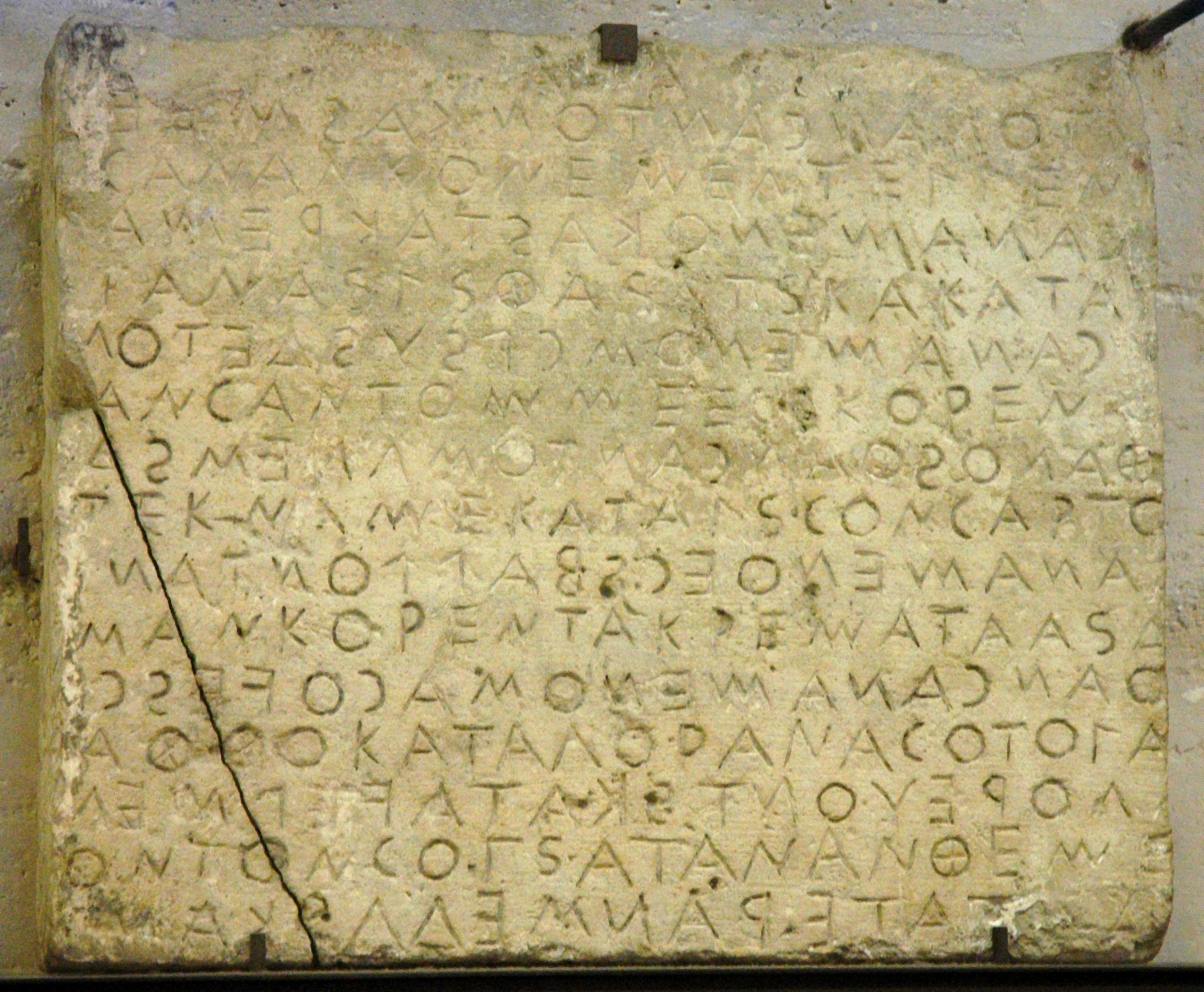
Inheritance regulations, fragment of the 11th column of the Law Code of Gortyn, Louvre

There is evidence of human occupation in Gortyn as far back as the Neolithic era (7000 BC). Many artifacts have been found from the Minoan period (2600–1100 BC) as well as some from the Early Iron Age (c. 1100 BC).

The city's period of greatest prosperity was the Hellenistic era. Gortyn was the most powerful and prosperous city of Crete and took hegemony of the island, dominating the entire valley from Messara to Levina.

During the Lyttian War in 220 BC the Gortynians were divided by civil strife. The elder Gortynians remained loyal to their traditional ally Knossos, while the younger favoured the Lyttians. Reinforced by a contingent of Aetolians, the Knossians marched to Gortys and the elders there led them to occupy their citadel. Then they resolved to kill or expel their younger opponents. The young Gortynians took refuge in the port of Phaistos and some time later they launched an attack against the port of Gortys, which they occupied in order to besiege their opponents in the citadel of Gortys.

Later in the 2nd century, after the destruction of Phaistos, Gortyn extended its power to Matala. Gortyn had excellent relations with Ptolemy IV of Egypt, and experienced a new period of prosperity during the Roman period. As it had allied with the Romans, it avoided the disaster that happened to many other Cretan cities, when invaded by Quintus Caecilius Metellus Creticus in 68 BC.

Gortyn continued to rise under Roman rule, and became the capital of the joint province of Creta et Cyrenaica. From the 4th century it was the capital of a separate province of Crete. The city was destroyed in ca. AD 828 by invading Arabs, who established their own state on the island. One of the first Christian churches was built here and the remains of an important Christian cathedral of Crete can still be seen today. This cathedral, dedicated to St. Titus, the first Bishop of Crete, was erected in the 6th century AD. Built with large isodomic stones, this cathedral keeps its intended height only in the areas of the Holy Bema and in pastophoria. The church structure is a cruciform with a dome which is based on four pillars.

== Archaeology ==
Excavations of Gortyn were begun in 1884 by the Italian School of Archaeology at Athens. The excavations showed that Gortyn was inhabited from the Neolithic age. Ruins of a settlement on the citadel of Gortyn, were discovered and dated back to 1050 BC, their collapse dating to the seventh century BC. Later the area was fortified with a wall. At the top of the hill in the citadel a temple was found dating to the 7th century BC. In this area two embossed plates were found, along with several other sculptures and paintings. Daedalic plastic and many other clay figurines, black and red figure paintings and plenty of pottery, especially the type called kernos, were found in the temple. Graves dating to the geometric age were found on the south side of the citadel. Regarding the lower town, the excavation uncovered the position of the Agora (market) and the temple of Pythian Apollo, which is 600 meters from the Agora. At the foot of Prophet Elias are traces of a sanctuary of Demeter. 35°3′48″N 24°56′49″E

== Monuments ==
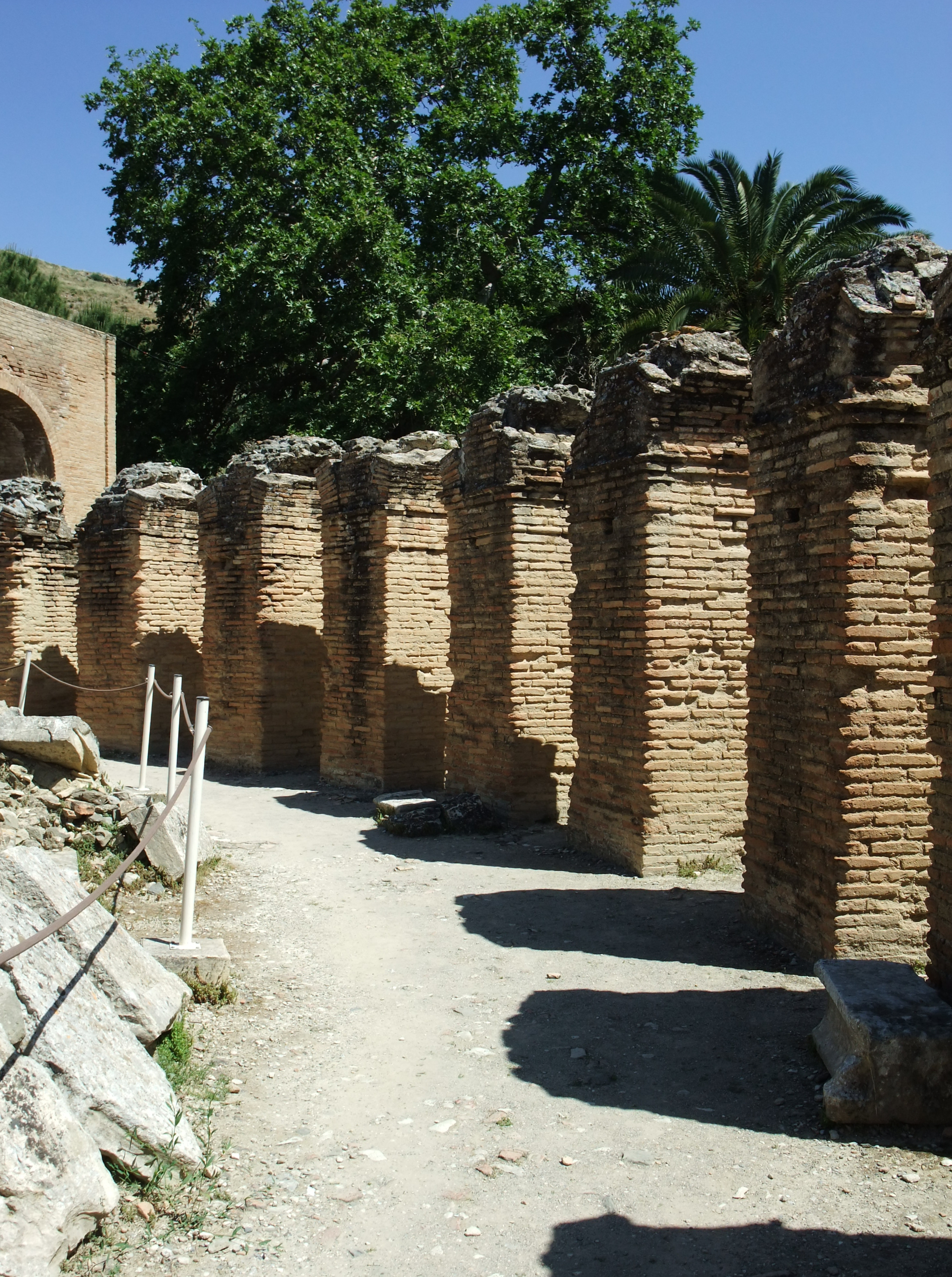
Detail of the ancient Odeon

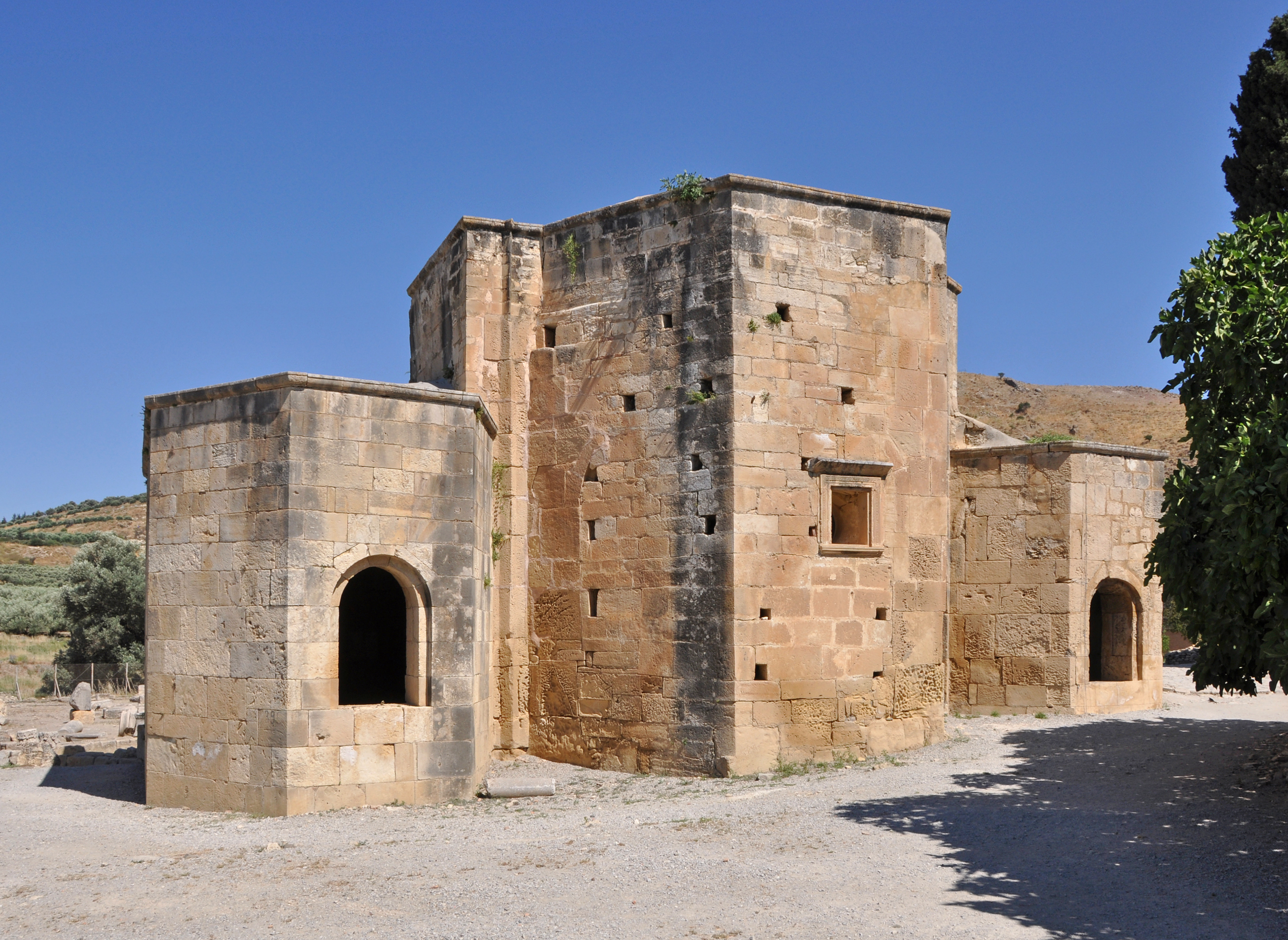
Saint Titus Basilica

The heart of Roman Gortyn is the Praetorium, the seat of the Roman Governor of Crete. The Praetorium was built in the 1st century AD, but it was altered significantly over the next eight centuries. In the same area, between the Agora and the temple of Apollo are the ruins of the Roman baths (thermae), as well as the temple of Apollo, an honorary arch, and the temple of the Egyptian deities with the worship statues of Isis, Serapis and Anubis. Parts of the Roman settlement, such as the theater (2nd century AD), have been unearthed during excavations. The theater has two entrances and a half-circular orchestra, the outline of which may still be seen today. Behind the Roman Theater are what has been called the "Queen of the Inscriptions". These inscriptions are the laws of the city of Gortyn, which are inscribed in the Dorian dialect on large stone slabs and are still plainly visible.

== Law code ==
Among archaeologists, ancient historians, and classicists Gortyn is known today primarily because of the 1884 discovery of the Gortyn Code which is both the oldest and most complete known example of a code of ancient Greek law. The code was discovered on the site of a structure built by the Roman emperor Trajan, the Odeon, which for the second time, reused stones from an inscription-bearing wall that also had been incorporated into the foundation of an earlier Hellenistic structure. Although portions of the inscriptions have been placed in museums such as the Louvre in Paris, a modern structure at the site of the mostly ruined Odeon now houses many of the stones bearing the famous law code.

A copy of the code has been returned to Athens by the Italian Museum in Taranto and is now housed in the Greek Bouli.

== Myth of Europa and Zeus ==
Classical Greek mythology has it that Gortyn was the site of one of Zeus' many affairs. This myth features the princess Europa, whose name has been applied to the continent, Europe. Disguised as a bull, Zeus abducted Europa from Lebanon and they had an affair under a plane tree (platanus), a tree that may be seen today in Gortys. Following this affair three children were born, Minos, Rhadamanthys and Sarpedon, who became the kings of the three Minoan Palaces in Crete. The identification of Europa in this myth gives weight to the claim that the civilization of the European continent was born on the island of Crete. A colossal statue of Europa sitting on the back of a bull was discovered at the amphitheatre in Gortyn in the nineteenth century and is now in the collections of the British Museum. Many coins were found with Europa representations on the back, showing that the people honored Europa as a great goddess.

== The Odyssey ==
According to Book III of Homer's The Odyssey, Menelaus and his fleet of ships, returning home from the Trojan War, were blown off course to the Gortyn coastline. Homer describes stormy seas that pushed the ships against a sharp reef, ultimately destroying many of the vessels but sparing the crew.

== Notable people ==
- Thaletas (7th century BC), musician
- Saint Titus (d.107), Bishop of Crete and saint
- Philip of Gortyna (d.180), Bishop of Gortyn and saint
