= Vincenzo La Rosa =

Italian archaeologist (1941–2014)

- Born: October 21, 1941; Noto, Italy
- Died: November 5, 2014 (aged 72–73); Catania, Italy
- Known for: Excavation of Milena, Centuripe, Haghia Triada, and Phaistos
- Scientific career
- Fields: Archaeology

Vincenzo La Rosa (October 21, 1941 – November 5, 2014) was a distinguished Italian archaeologist known for his significant contributions to the study of prehistoric and Aegean civilizations, stemming from his archaeological work in Crete and Sicily.

== Early life ==
Vincenzo La Rosa was born in Noto, in the province of Syracuse, Sicily and graduated in 1964 from the University of Catania. He then continued his studies at the Italian Archaeological School in Athens.

== Career ==
Vincenzo La Rosa's academic career was marked by his archaeological work in Crete and Sicily, where he led pivotal excavations that deepened understanding of Minoan and indigenous Sicilian cultures. His excavation projects included significant sites such as Haghia Triada and Phaistos in Crete, and Milena and Centuripe in Sicily. His research provided critical insights into the Minoan civilization and the prehistoric cultures of Sicily.

In 1965, Vincenzo La Rosa was posted to Messara as an assistant to Doro Levi. Between 1968 and 1974, he excavated at Centuripe and ancient Noto. Later (1978-1992), he devoted his efforts to the site of Milena, in the valley of the Platani river, which was little known archaeologically before his research. However, it was in Crete that La Rosa reached his ultimate scientific destination, first in the excavations of Phaistos, then as director of the excavations of Seli in Kamilari (1973-76), Prinias and above all of Haghia Triada (from 1977) and Phaistos (1994, 2000-2004), summoned by Di Vita who was then director of the Italian Archaeological School of Athens.

Since 1975, La Rosa was a tenured professor of Indigenous Civilizations of Sicily and Aegean Archaeology at the University of Catania. He also served as the director of the Greek Archaeology Studies Center at the CNR in Catania and was vice-director of the Italian Archaeological School in Athens. Additionally, he founded and directed the Center for Cretan Archaeology, fostering international scholarly collaboration and directed the Creta Antica journal.

He was particularly popular with the local residents of Messara who affectionately called him Nikos and owned a home in Kamilari.

== Legacy ==
In recognition of his legacy, the University of Catania commemorated La Rosa with a two-day event titled Una lezione per il futuro (A Lesson for the Future) in November 2015. This event included the dedication of the Aula Magna at Palazzo Ingrassia in his honor and featured a conference at the Monastery of the Benedectines in Catania, attended by prominent scholars and former students.

For a comprehensive overview of his life and work, the volume Vincenzo La Rosa (1941–2014): Un archeologo tra Sicilia e Egeo, edited by Lucia Arcifa and Pietro Militello, offers detailed insights into his archaeological endeavors and academic contributions.

== Honors ==
- Honorary citizen of Kamilari, Crete (1996)
- Cross of St. Paul and St. Titus by the Church of Crete (2011)
- Honorary citizen of Milena, Italy (2014)

== See also ==
- Hagia Triada
- Phaistos
- Minoan civilization
