= Kamilari =

Village and archaeological site on Crete

Kamilari Καμηλάρι
- Community
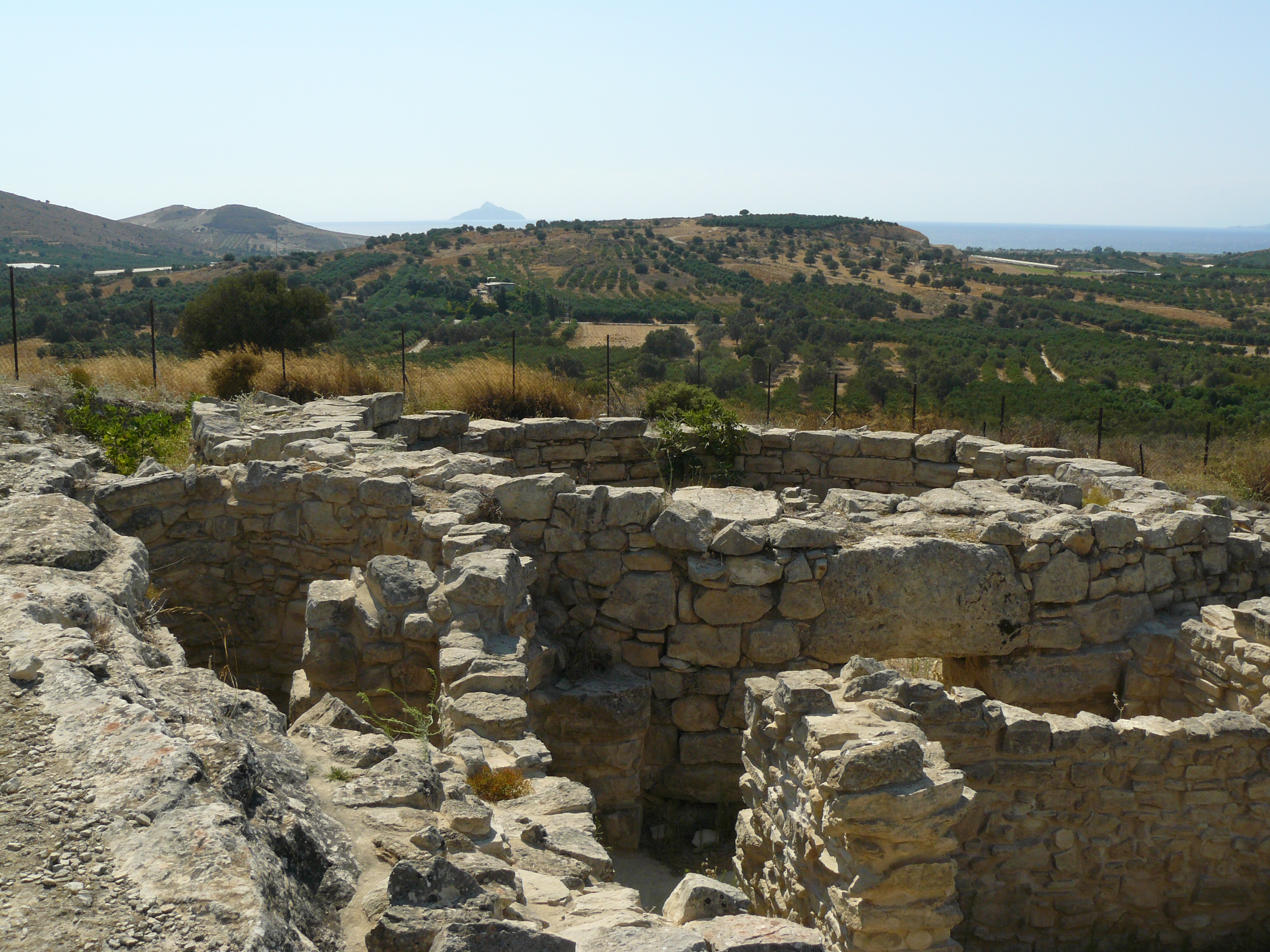
- Tholos tomb near Kamilari

- Location within Greece
- Coordinates: 35°01′59″N 24°47′24″E
- Country: Greece
- Administrative region: Crete
- Regional unit: Heraklion
- Municipality: Faistos
- Municipal unit: Tympaki

Population (2021)
  - Community: 795
- Time zone: UTC+2 (EET)
  - Summer (DST): UTC+3 (EEST)

Kamilari (Greek: Καμηλάρι) is a village on the island of Crete, Greece. There is an archaeological site of an ancient Minoan cemetery nearby, the Kamilari Minoan Tholos tomb and a Roman graveyard at the slopes of the Ovgora hill.

The origin of the name "Kamilari" is Byzantine. It is derived from the word kamilaris or '‘Καμηλάρης’' meaning "the one who rides a camel"

Kamilari is built atop three hills:

- Ovgora, meaning "good view", is the highest, with an altitude of 100 metres (330 ft),
- Goulas, atop which are an old school and Hellenistic archaeological remains
- Alevrota

== Archaeology ==
The Minoan tholos tomb is on a low hill 1.9 kilometres (1.2 mi) southwest of Hagia Triada. East of the tomb were five rooms, probably added during Middle Minoan IIIA, and an area for offerings north of these rooms. Here, 500 vases were found upside down. Another 250 vases were found inside the tomb.

Three clay models were found in the Late Minoan IIIA burials. One is of a group of dancers, another is two people standing in front of four seated people, and the third is of a banquet including the Minoan horns "of consecration" and doves. These artifacts are on display at the Heraklion Archaeological Museum.

== Village ==
Fairs are held in the village during the feast-days of the village on 27 July and 6 August.
