= Kalyvia Analipseos =

Kalyvia Analipseos Καλύβια Αναλήψεως
- Settlement
- Location within Greece
- Coordinates: 39°50.1′N 22°1.5′E
- Country: Greece
- Administrative region: Thessaly
- Regional unit: Larissa
- Municipality: Elassona
- Municipal unit: Potamia
- Community: Sykia
- Elevation: 250 m (820 ft)

Population (2021)
  - Total: 89
- Time zone: UTC+2 (EET)
  - Summer (DST): UTC+3 (EEST)
- Postal code: 402 00
- Area code: +30-2493
- Vehicle registration: PI

Kalyvia Analipseos (Greek: Καλύβια Αναλήψεως, Greek pronunciation: [ka'livʝa ana'lipseos]) is a village of the Elassona municipality. Before the 2011 local government reform, it was a part of the municipality of Potamia. The 2021 census recorded 89 inhabitants in the village. Kalyvia Analipseos is a part of the community of Sykia.

== See also ==
- List of settlements in the Larissa regional unit
