= Sykia, Larissa =

Sykia Συκιά
- Community
- Location within Greece
- Coordinates: 39°49.8′N 22°3.2′E
- Country: Greece
- Administrative region: Thessaly
- Regional unit: Larissa
- Municipality: Elassona
- Municipal unit: Potamia

Area
  - Community: 36.806 km^{2} (14.211 sq mi)
- Elevation: 199 m (653 ft)

Population (2021)
  - Community: 497
  - Density: 13.5/km^{2} (35.0/sq mi)
- Time zone: UTC+2 (EET)
  - Summer (DST): UTC+3 (EEST)
- Postal code: 402 00
- Area code: +30-2493
- Vehicle registration: PI

Sykia (Greek: Συκιά, Greek pronunciation: [si'ca]) is a village and a community of the Elassona municipality. Before the 2011 local government reform it was a part of the municipality of Potamia, of which it was a municipal district. The community of Sykia covers an area of 36.806 km^{2}.

== Administrative division ==
The community of Sykia consists of two settlements:

- Kalyvia Analipseos and
- Sykia.

== Economy ==
The population of Sykia is occupied in animal husbandry and agriculture (tobacco, viticulture and olivess).

== Population ==
Historical population
Year	Pop.	±%
2001	805	—
2011	624	−22.5%
2021	497	−20.4%

== See also ==
- List of settlements in the Larissa regional unit
