= Linear A =

Undeciphered writing system of ancient Crete

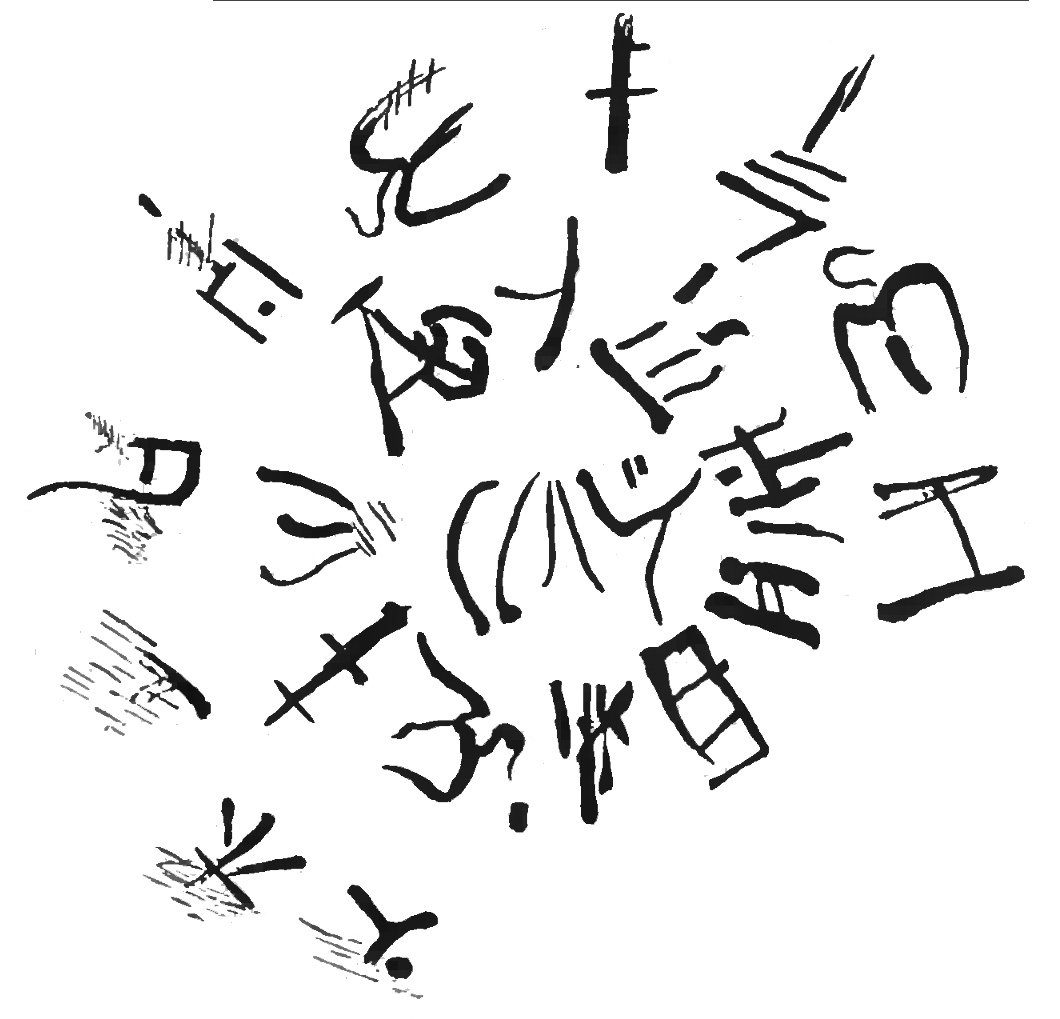
- Linear A inscription on a cup
- Script type: Undeciphered presumed logosyllabic (syllabic and ideographic)
- Period: MM IB to LM IIIA 1800–1450 BC
- Status: Extinct
- Direction: Left-to-right
- Languages: 'Minoan' (unknown)

Related scripts
- Child systems: Linear B, Cypro-Minoan syllabary
- Sister systems: Cretan hieroglyphs

ISO 15924
- ISO 15924: Lina (400), Linear A

Unicode
- Unicode alias: Linear A
- Unicode range: "U+10600–U+1077F" (PDF). "Final Accepted Script Proposal" (PDF).

Linear A is a writing system that was used by the Minoans of Crete from 1800 BC to 1450 BC. Linear A was the primary script used in palace and religious writings of the Minoan civilization. It was adapted into Linear B, which was used by the Mycenaeans to write an early form of Greek. Since its modern rediscovery in 1900, no texts in the script have yet been deciphered. Archaeologist Sir Arthur Evans named the script "Linear" because its characters consisted simply of lines inscribed in clay, in contrast to the more pictographic characters in Cretan hieroglyphs – likewise undeciphered – that were used during the same period.

Linear A belongs to a group of scripts that evolved independently of the Egyptian and Mesopotamian systems. During the second millennium BC, there were four major branches of this group: Linear A, Linear B, Cypro-Minoan, and Cretan hieroglyphic. In the 1950s, Linear B was deciphered and its underlying language was found to be Mycenaean Greek. Linear A shares many glyphs and alloglyphs with Linear B, and the syllabic glyphs are thought to notate similar syllabic values, but none of the proposed readings lead to a language that scholars can understand.

== Script ==
Linear A consists of over 300 signs including regional variants and ones which occur only once. Among these, a core group of 90 occur with some frequency throughout the script's geographic and chronological extent.

The complex sign in the top row is formed out of the two on the bottom row.

As a logosyllabic writing system, Linear A includes signs which stand for syllables as well as others standing for words or concepts, and signs could be combined via ligature to form complex ones. Complex signs usually behave as ideograms and most are hapax legomena, meaning that they occur only once in the surviving corpus. Linear A signs are divided into four categories:

1. syllabic signs
2. ligatures and composite signs
3. ideograms
4. numerals and metrical signs

Linear A was usually written left-to-right, but a handful of documents were written right-to-left or boustrophedon.

=== Signary ===
Linear A: signary and numbering according to Emmett Bennett
*01–*20	*21–*30	*31–*53	*54–*74	*76–*122	*123–*306
*01	*21	*31	*54	*76	*123
*02	*21	*34	*55	*77	*131a
*03	*21	*37	*56	*78	*131b
*04	*22	*38	*57	*79	*131c
*05	*22	*39	*58	*80	*164
*06	*22	*40	*59	*81	*171
*07	*23	*41	*60	*82	*180
*08	*23	*44	*61	*85	*188
*09	*24	*45	*65	*86	*191
*10	*26	*46	*66	*87	*301
*11	*27	*47	*67	*100/ *102	*302
*13	*28	*49	*69	*118	*303
*16	*28b	*50	*70	*120	*304
*17	*29	*51	*73	*120b	*305
*20	*30	*53	*74	*122	*306

=== Special signs ===
Furthermore, the following ‘supplementary’ syllabograms for more complex syllables can be identified (where in some cases the exact pronunciation is or used to be unknown even for Linear B, hence the use of subscript numbers):

Special signs
Character	𐘒	𐙄	𐘩	𐘰	𐘜	𐘽	𐘷	𐙆
Transcription	pi_{2}	au	nwa	pa_{2}	pu_{2}	ra_{2} (rya)	ta_{2} (tya)	twe
Bennett's number	*22	*85	*48	*56	*29	*76	*66	*87

=== Ideograms ===
The following list contains some frequent ideograms/logograms whose meaning is known and uncontroversial and almost all of which are preserved in Linear B. The meaning of many others is debated. Note that some of the ideograms are also used as syllabograms; in such cases, the sound value is indicated in the table before the Bennett number.

Glyph	Code point	Bennett	Conventional Latin name	meaning
People and animals
𐙇	U+10647	*100/102	VIR vir	person, man
𐘏	U+1060F	QI *21	OVIS ovis	sheep
𐘐	U+10610	*21F	OVIS^{f}	ewe
𐘑	U+10611	*21M	OVIS^{m}	ram
𐘒	U+10612	PI_{2} *22	CAP capra	goat
𐘓	U+10613	*22F	CAP^{f}	she-goat
𐘔	U+10614	*22M	CAP^{m}	he-goat
𐙄	U+10644	AU *85	SUS sūs	pig
𐘕	U+10615	MU *23	BOS bōs	bovine
𐘖	U+10616	*23M	BOS^{m}	ox/bull
Dry products
𐙉	U+10649	*120	GRA grānum	wheat
𐙊	U+1064A	*120B	GRA grānum	wheat
𐙋	U+1064B	*122	OLIV olīva	olives
𐘝	U+1061D	NI *30	FIC fīcus	figs
𐙗	U+10657	*303	CYP	cyperus
𐘮	U+1062E	WA *54	TELA tēla	cloth
Liquids
𐙖	U+10095	*302	OLE ŏlĕum	oil
𐙍	U+1064D	*131A	VIN vīnum	wine
𐙎	U+1064E	*131B	VIN vīnum	wine
𐙏	U+1064F	*131C	VIN vīnum	wine
Vessels
𐚠	U+106A0	*400-VAS	VAS vās	–
𐚡	U+106A1	*401-VAS	VAS vās	–
𐚢	U+106A2	*402-VAS	VAS vās	–
𐚣	U+106A3	*403-VAS	VAS vās	–
𐚤	U+106A4	*404-VAS	VAS vās	–
𐚥	U+106A5	*405-VAS	VAS vās	–
𐚦	U+106A6	*406-VAS	VAS vās	–
𐚧	U+106A7	*407-VAS	VAS vās	–
𐚨	U+106A8	*408-VAS	VAS vās	–
𐚩	U+106A9	*409-VAS	VAS vās	–
𐚪	U+106AA	*410-VAS	VAS vās	–
𐚫	U+106AB	*411-VAS	VAS vās	–
𐚬	U+106AC	*412-VAS	VAS vās	–
𐚭	U+106AD	*413-VAS	VAS vās	–
𐚮	U+106AE	*414-VAS	VAS vās	–
𐚯	U+106AF	*415-VAS	VAS vās	–
𐚰	U+106B0	*416-VAS	VAS vās	–
𐚱	U+106B1	*417-VAS	VAS vās	–
𐚲	U+106B2	*418-VAS	VAS vās	–
Other
𐙔	U+10654	*191	GAL galea	helmet

== Numerals ==
These numerals follow a decimal system: units are represented by vertical dashes, tens by horizontal dashes, hundreds by circles, and thousands by circles with rays. There are special symbols to indicate fractions and weights. Specific signs that coincide with numerals are regarded as fractions; these sign combinations are known as klasmatograms.

Integers can be read and the operations of addition, subtraction, multiplication, and division are quite straightforward, similarly to Roman numerals.

Aegean numerals
1	2	3	4	5	6	7	8	9
1	2	3	4	5	6	7	8	9
10	20	30	40	50	60	70	80	90
10	20	30	40	50	60	70	80	90
100	200	300	400	500	600	700	800	900
100	200	300	400	500	600	700	800	900

=== Fractions ===
There is a lack of scholarly agreement about signs, generally called klasmatograms, for Linear A fractions. In 2021 Corazza et al. proposed the following values, most of which had been previously suggested:

Proposed values of fraction glyphs
Symbol	Glyph	Value
J		1/2
E		1/4
B		1/5
D		1/6
F		1/8
K		1/10
H		1/16?
L^{2}		1/20
A		1/24?
L^{3}		1/30
L^{4}		1/40
L^{6}		1/60
W		= BB? (2/5)
X		= AA? (1/12)
Y		?
Ω		?

Other fractions are composed by addition: the common JE and DD are 3/4 and 1/3 (2/6), BB = 2/5, EF = 3/8, etc. (and indeed B 1/5 looks as though it may derive from KK 2/10). L, Y, and Ω are hapax legomena (only occur once) and it has been proposed that glyph L is spurious.

Several of these values are supported by Linear B. Although Linear B used a different numbering system, several of the Linear A fractions were adopted as fractional units of measurement. For example, Linear B DD and (presumably AA) are 1/3 and 1/12 of a lana, while K is 1/10 of the main unit for dry weight.

== Corpus ==
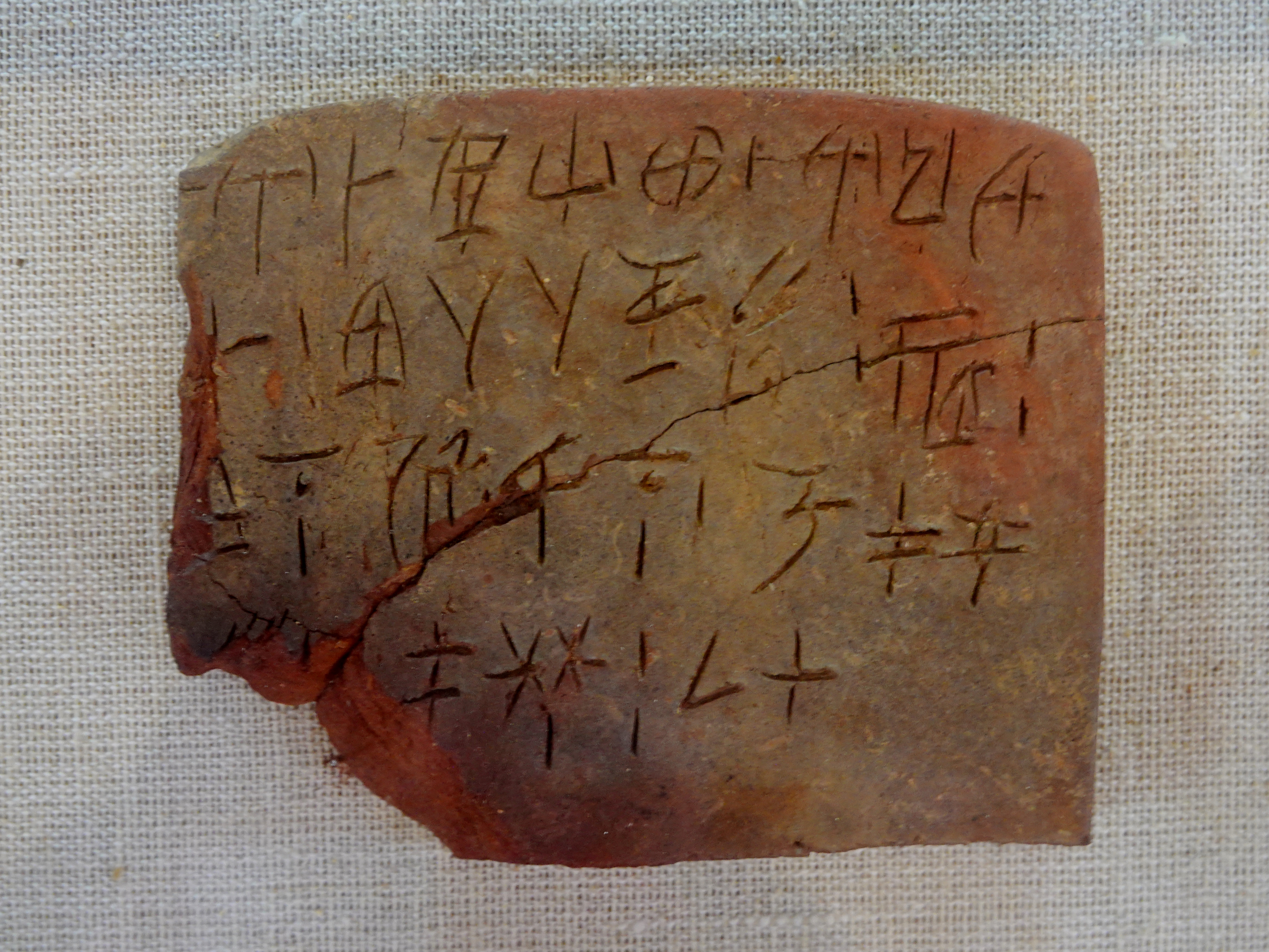
Linear A tablet, Chania Archaeological Museum

The Linear A corpus consists of roughly 1400 inscriptions, amounting to 7400 sign tokens. An additional 1100 objects have been found with apparent Linear A inscriptions, but are not counted as part of the corpus because they are too poorly preserved to be readable. The readable corpus is notably smaller than those for other ancient writing systems such as cuneiform or the later Linear B, a fact that has hindered decipherment attempts. As observed by archaeologist John Younger, the entire Linear A corpus takes up only 1.84 pages of letter paper when typeset in 12 point font and 1-inch margins.

Linear A has been found chiefly on Crete and the Aegean islands, but some also at some mainland Greek sites such as Mycenae and Argos and at Miletus in Western Anatolia. Inscriptions found at Troy and Tel Haror may be Linear A, but are too fragmentary for definitive classification. Roughly half of the known inscriptions were found at the site of Hagia Triada in southern Crete, which has yielded 1269 Linear A objects with Linear A writing. An additional 595 come from the eastern Cretan site of Zakros, 313 from Khania, 65 from Phaistos, 32 from Knossos, 23 from Palaikastro, with all other sites yielding less than 20.

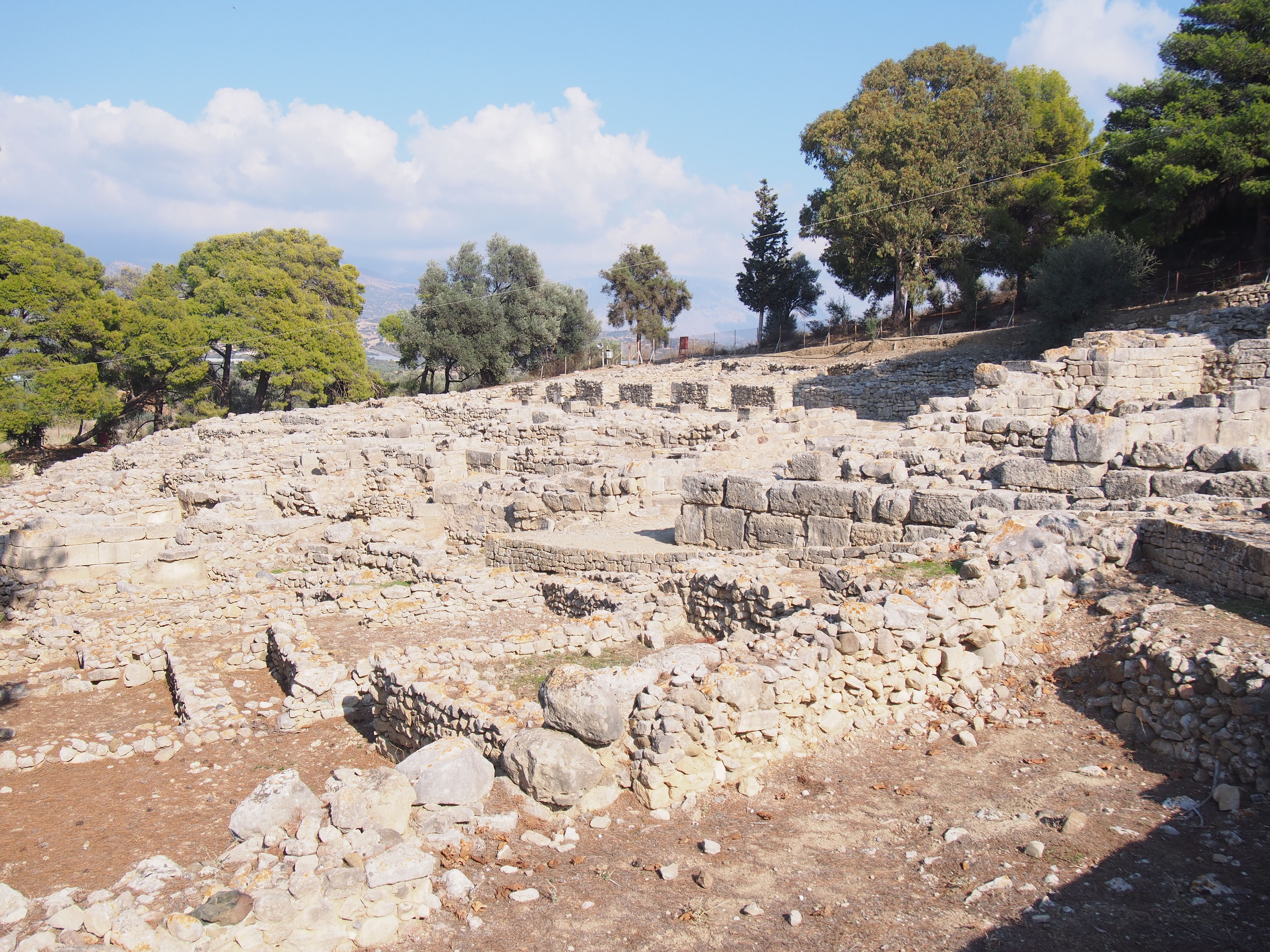
The Minoan site of Hagia Triada, where roughly half of the known Linear A inscriptions were excavated.

Linear A texts often come from administrative contexts such as Minoan palaces, though the script was also widely used for other functions such as inscriptions on ritual objects. Linear A was written on various media, such as clay tablets, stone offering tables and vessels, gold and silver hairpins, roundels, and pottery.

The first comprehensive compendium of Linear A inscriptions sometimes referred to as GORILA (from Godart Olivier Recueil des inscriptions en lineaire A) was produced by Louis Godart and Jean-Pierre Olivier in multiple volumes between 1976 and 1985. In 2011 work began on a supplement to that compendium. In 2020 a project was begun, called SigLA, to put all the known Linear A inscriptions online at a single site.

=== Tablets ===
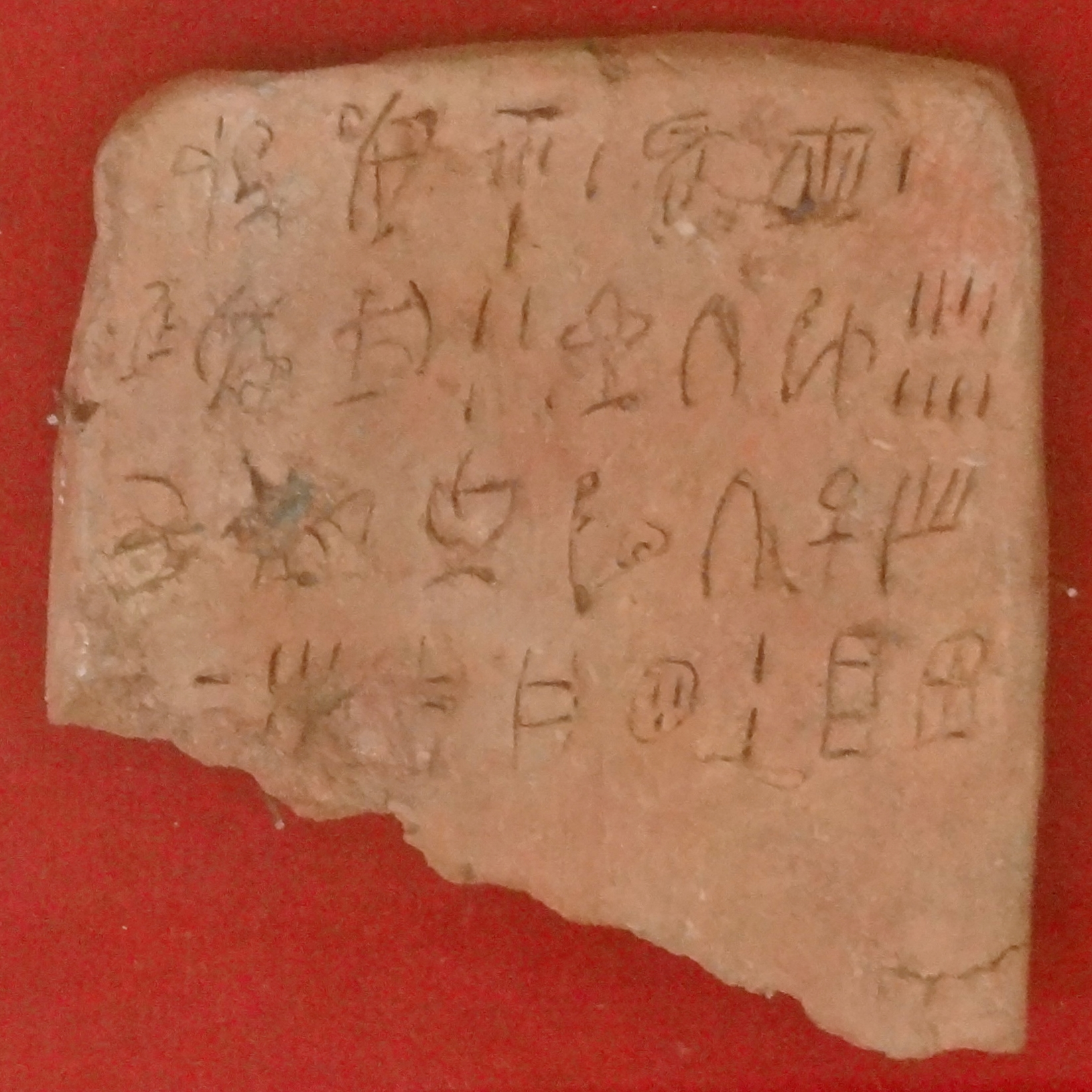
Linear A tablet from the palace of Zakros, Archeological Museum of Sitia

Almost all Linear A tablets, most in a fragmentary condition, have been found on the island of Crete, dated to the Neopalatial Period. At that time Crete was divided by mountains and other geographic features into a number of polities, each with its own urban center. These tablets have been found at Hagia Triada (147 tablets), Petras (2 tablets), Phaistos (26 tablets), Knossos (6 tablets), Archanes (7 tablets), Myrtos Pyrgos (2 tablets), Palaikastro (2 tablets), Zakros (31 tablets), Tylissos (2 tablets), Malia (6 tablets), Gournia (1 tablet), and Khania (99 tablets). One Linear A tablet was found on Kea in the Cyclades. Three tablet fragments were found on the island of Santorini (Thera). The handful of known Cretan Hieroglyphs tablets (with relatively few signs) were also found on Crete at Malia and Kato Symi.

=== Sealed documents ===
Seals and clay sealings served the same role of inventory control and ownership as in the ancient Near East and Egypt. Large numbers of sealings have been found, primarily on Crete and in the Late Minoan IB period. The primary sources of sealed documents come from Haghia Triada (1103), Zakros (560), Khania (210), Knossos (125), Phaistos (35), Malia (6), and Tylissos (5). It is not clear what was commonly used to impress the sealing as only a few Linear A inscribed "seal stones" have been found. In other regions cylinder seals and stamp seals fulfilled this role.

Sealed documents are divided by archaeologists into four classes:

- Roundels – disks of clay with sealing on the edges
- Hanging nodules – sealed lumps of clay originally attached to string
- Parcel nodules – lumps of clay with sealing on back
- Noduli – clay lumps like hanging nodules but not formerly string attached

=== Libation tables ===
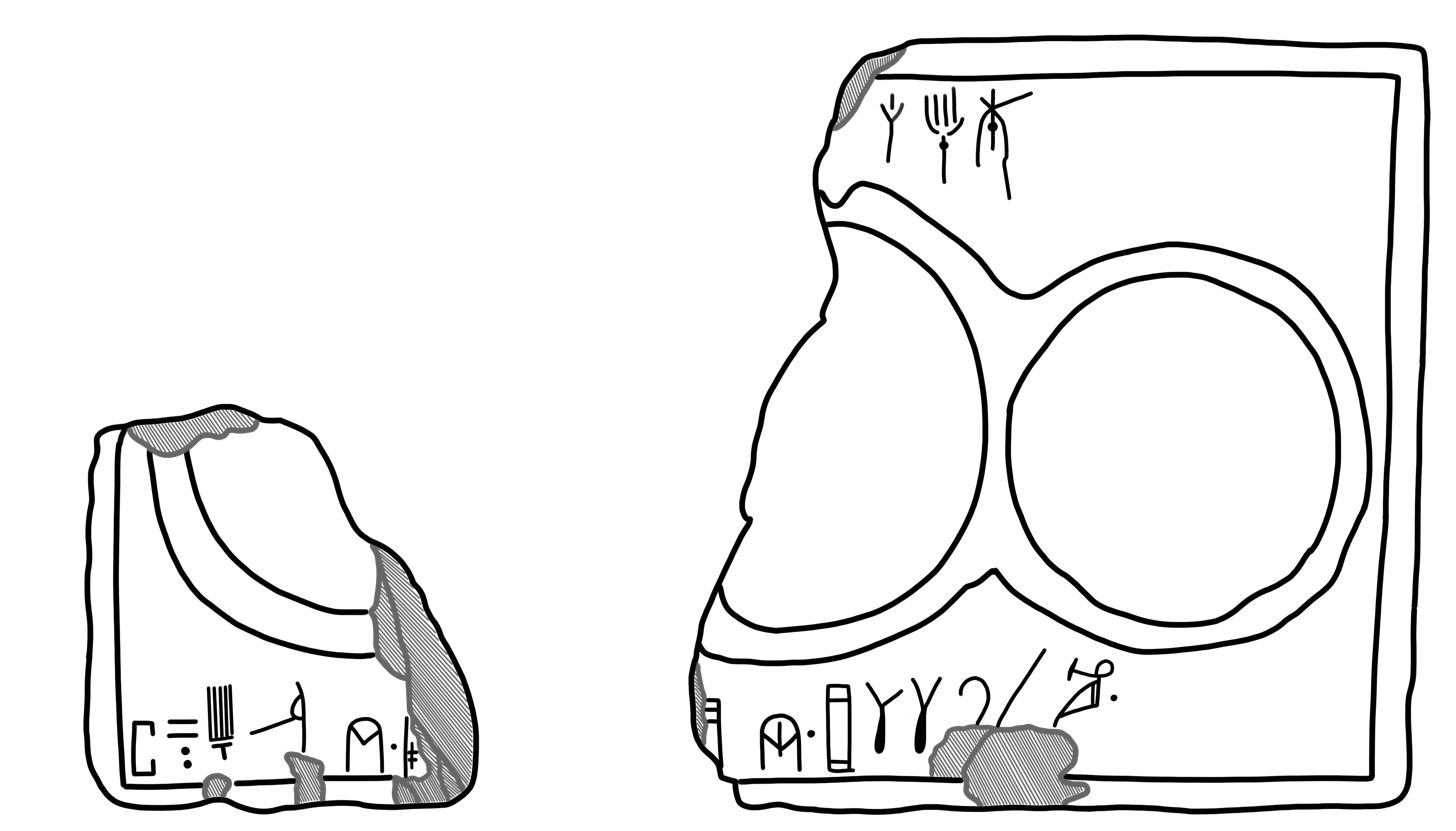
A partially preserved libation table from Psykhro.

A group of Minoan finds, usually from sanctuaries, have traditionally been called libation tables. They come in full sized and miniature versions, usually of stone. Because of the findspots, at cultic sites like Mount Juktas, they are usually assumed to be religious in nature though that is not certain. So far about 1000 libation tables have been recovered at 27 different sites on Crete, of which 41 have Linear A inscriptions. These inscriptions follow a standardized "libation formula", a formula also found on a few other objects, primarily vessels.

The "libation formula" has been much studied. A similar construct in Cretan Hieroglyphs, the "Archanes Formula", is the main proposed link to Linear A.

=== Other sources ===
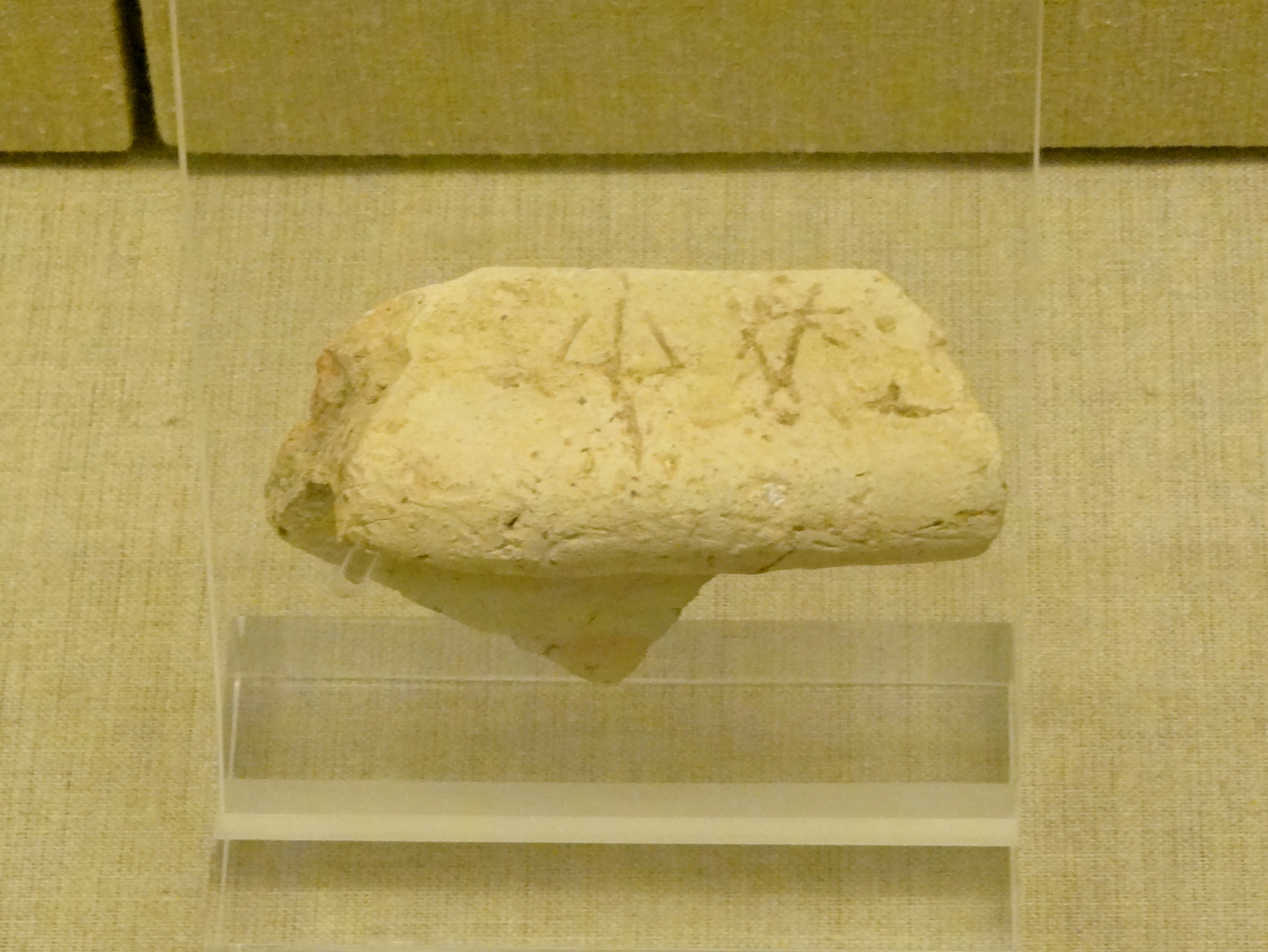
Linear A inscription at the Museum of Prehistory, in Thera

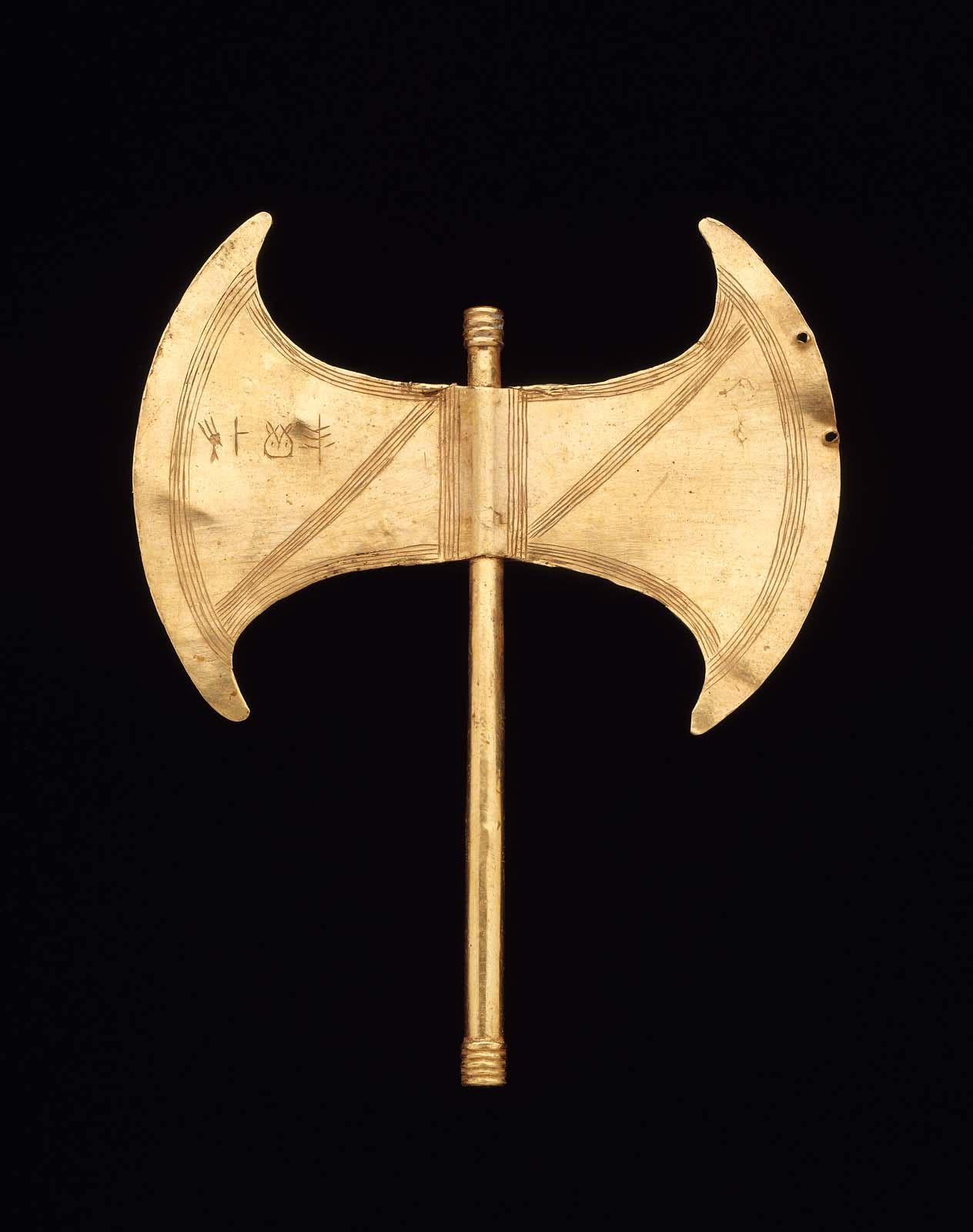
Minoan gold votive double axe or labrys, less than 4 inches tall. On the left blade is an inscription in Linear A, possibly an invocation to the goddess Demeter.

While most of the recovered Linear A signs have come from tablets, sealed documents, libation tables and related ritual objects, a number of very short Linear A inscriptions have been found in the Minoan area of operation, primarily in the form of potmarks and mason's marks. A problem is that it can be difficult to tell if a single-sign (or even doubleton) is Linear A, Linear B, or Cretan Hieroglyphs because of the overlap in sign use. Vessel sherds were found at Traostalos, bearing three signs in total. Four vase sherds were found at Thera with signs, as well as a ostrakon with one sign. A vessel fragment was found at Miletus. Two pithoi with very fragmentary inscriptions were found at Pseira. Graffiti has been found at places like Hagia Triada. A small clay ball with three Linear A signs was found at Mikro Vouni on the island of Samothrace. A small stone tab with two signs was excavated in Ayios Stephanos, Laconia. A silver hair pin and a gold ring, both with fairly long Linear A inscriptions, were found at Mavro Spelio in Knossos. At Armenoi a stone amulet was found in a tholos grave from the Linear Minoan IB period inscribed with a combination of two Linear A ideograms.

A Linear A inscription was said to have been found in southeast Bulgaria. Another, somewhat more solid, find was at Tel Lachish. A Minoan graffito found at Tel Haror on a vessel fragment is either Linear A or Cretan hieroglyphs. Several tablets inscribed in signs similar to Linear A were found at Troy in northwestern Anatolia. While their status is disputed, they may be imports, as there is no evidence of Minoan presence in the Troad. Classification of these signs as a unique Trojan script (proposed by contemporary Russian linguist Nikolai Kazansky) is not accepted by other linguists. Two Linear A inscribed clay spindle whorls were also found at Troy.

A rescue excavation in the modern village of Knossos produced what is described as the longest known Linear A inscription. The object is a "sceptre" made out of elephant ivory with a handle and a ring. The ivory is inscribed with Linear A characters and other images. The excavators described it as the "first Linear A economic document coming from a cult building". Found in a number of fragments which had to be joined and some of the surfaces have been degraded by time.

== Chronology ==
Linear A was in use from roughly 1800 BC to 1450 BC, spanning the periods known as Middle Minoan II to Late Minoan IB. The origin of the script is unclear. It has been hypothesized that Linear A is a daughter script of Cretan Hieroglyphic, which appears somewhat earlier in the surviving record and was eventually replaced by it. However, the two scripts remained in use alongside one another for much of the Middle Minoan period, with Cretan hieroglyphs favored at sites on the northern coast such as Knossos, and Linear A spreading outward from southern sites such as Phaistos. A number of early inscriptions could be read either as Cretan hieroglyphic or as an early form of Linear A.

During the Late Minoan I period (c. 1700 BC to 1450 BC), Linear A became the chief Minoan script, replacing Cretan hieroglyphic throughout Crete. During this period, the related Cypro-Minoan syllabary appears on Cyprus and at sites with trading links to Cyprus. Much of the surviving Linear A corpus comes from the final decades of the Late Minoan IB period, when fiery destructions of Minoan towns and administrative centers baked clay tablets that would otherwise have been erased and reused, inadvertently preserving them for posterity.

The Late Minoan IB destructions (c. 1450 BC) brought about the end of the Neopalatial Minoan social order, and Linear A was never again used for administration. After a gap of 50–75 years, a new administrative system arose which instead used Linear B, an adaptation of Linear A used to write the Mycenaean Greek language. However, there are scattered examples of later Linear A writing in non-administrative contexts such as painted inscriptions on cups and figurines, attesting to some amount of continuity between the two writing systems.

The sequence and the geographical spread of Cretan hieroglyphs, Linear A, and Linear B, the three overlapping but distinct writing systems on Bronze Age Crete and the Greek mainland, can be summarized as follows:

Writing system	Geographical area	Time span
Cretan Hieroglyphic	Crete, Samothrace	c. 2100–1700 BC
Linear A	Crete, Aegean islands (Kea, Kythera, Melos, Thera), and Greek mainland (Laconia)	c. 1800–1450 BC
Cypro-Minoan	Cyprus and trading partners, Ugarit	c. 1550–1050 BC
Linear B	Crete (Knossos), and mainland (Pylos, Mycenae, Thebes, Tiryns)	c. 1450–1200 BC

== Decipherment ==
Linear A has not been fully deciphered. However, researchers are reasonably confident in the approximate sound values of most syllabic signs and are able to make inferences about the meanings of some texts; the language thus is sometimes described as "partially deciphered".

=== Challenges to decipherment ===
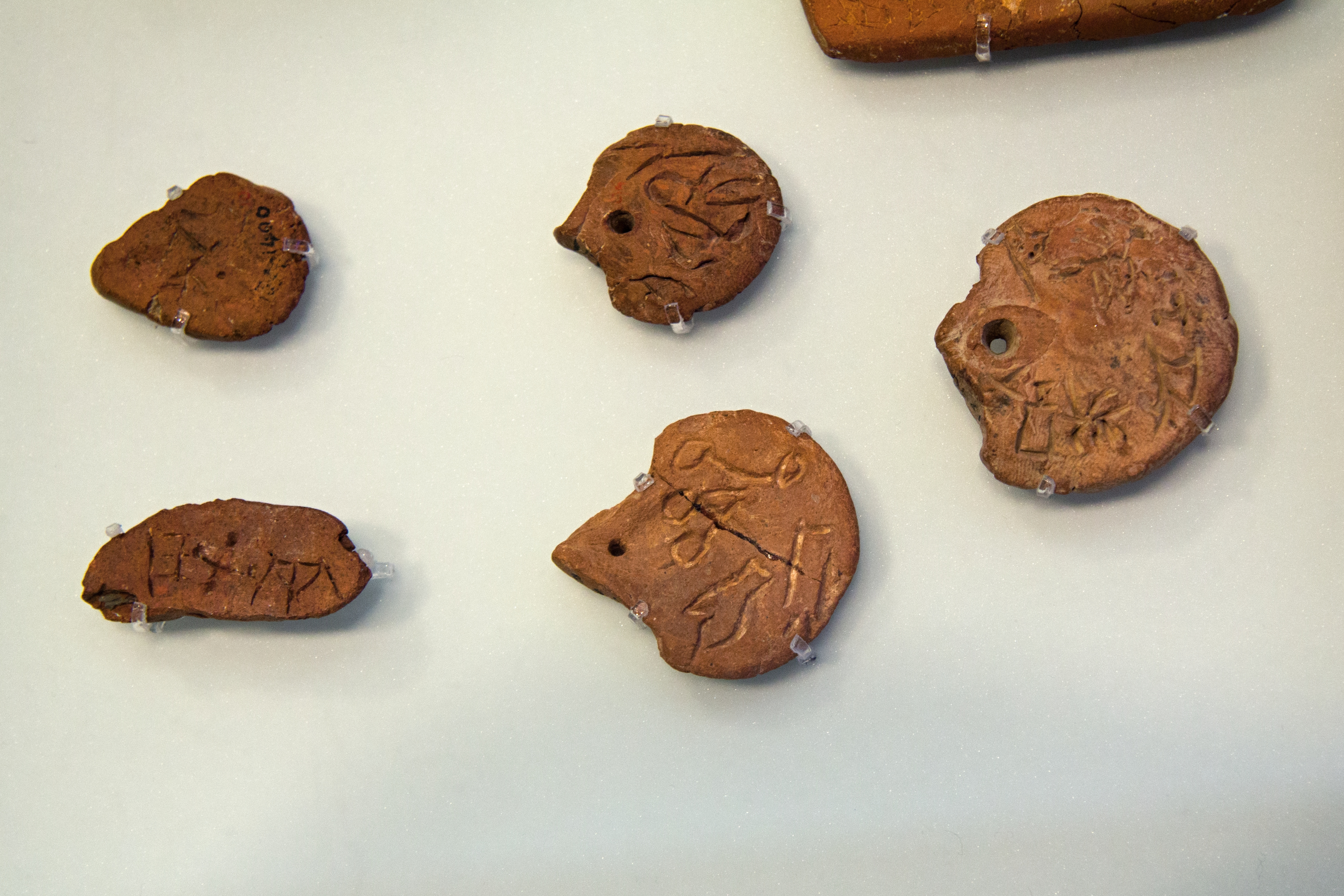
Linear A inscriptions are often brief, fragmentary, and hard to read.

One major barrier to its decipherment is the limited surviving corpus. Only around 1400 Linear A inscriptions survive, in contrast to the 6000 available for Linear B. As a result, researchers are stuck with limited sample sizes, making it difficult to reliably detect patterns. Similarly, Linear A inscriptions are often fragmentary, damaged, or otherwise hard to read. It can be difficult to individuate particular signs and to distinguish separate signs from handwriting variants. Finally, Linear A inscriptions tend to be brief and repetitive. Rather than complete sentences, many are lists where each entry consists of a toponym or personal name followed by a logogram and then a numeral. Thus, the surviving corpus contains few spelled-out words and limited evidence of the grammatical structure.

A second barrier is the scarcity of external evidence. No bilingual inscriptions have been found, preventing the script from being deciphered in the manner that Egyptian hieroglyphs were deciphered using the Rosetta Stone. The underlying language of Linear A has not been determined, and it is not clear that the same language was used for its entire period of use. The grammatical evidence that can be gleaned from the surviving corpus suggests that it was not a close relative of any known language.

=== Phonetic values ===
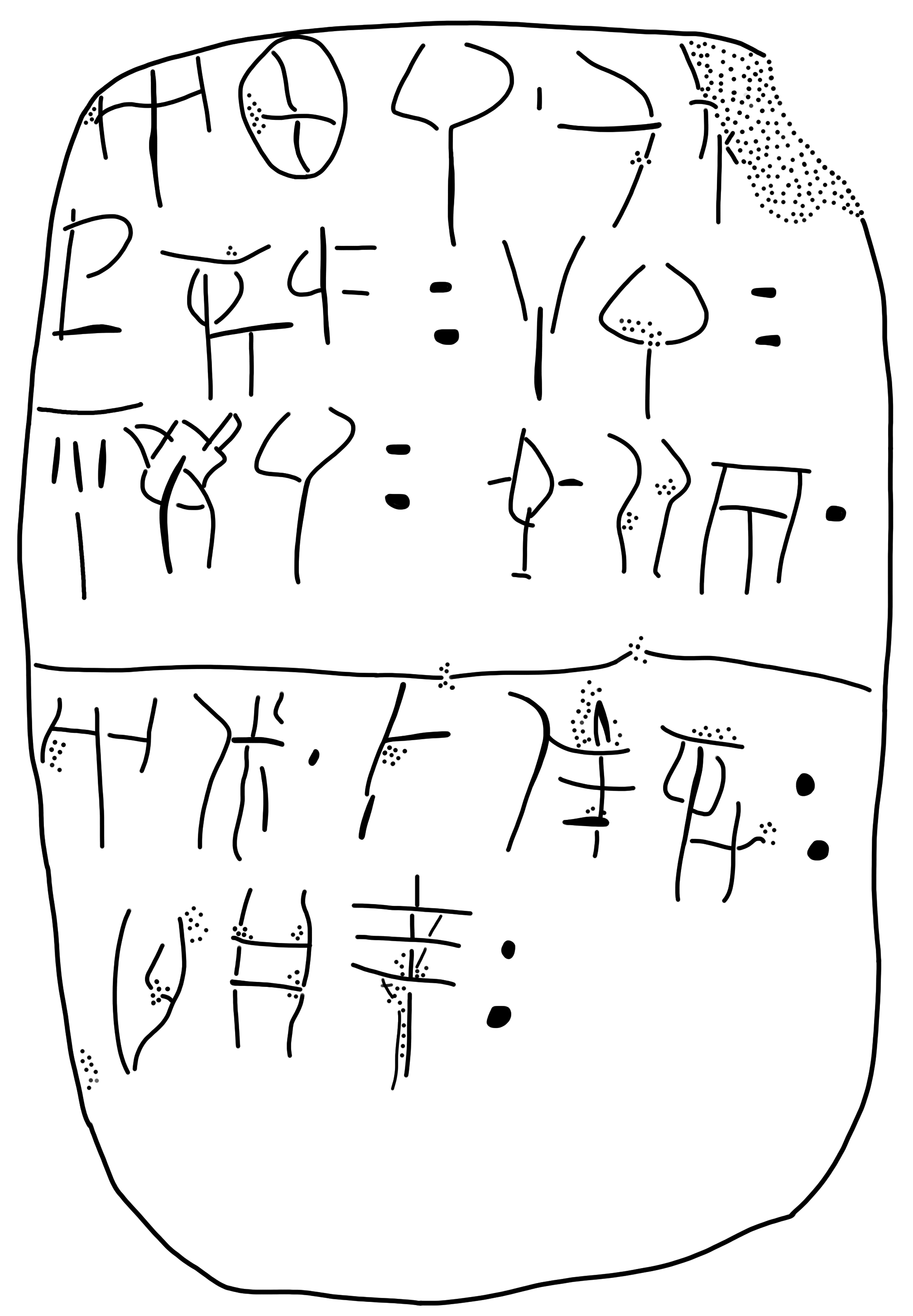
This Linear A tablet from Hagia Triada contains several sign sequences that appear to correspond to personal names attested in later Linear B texts.

For most of Linear A's syllabic signs, approximate sound values can be inferred based on the values of corresponding signs in Linear B. These sound values are widely accepted by current researchers, though they are not considered incontrovertible and many details remain up for debate. This does not amount to a complete decipherment, since it results in words that are uninterpretable.

These values are based on the homomorphy-homophony principle which states that in related writing systems, signs with similar forms will generally have similar phonetic values. Although this principle is not reliable across the board, there are a number of reasons why scholars have concluded that it does generally hold between Linear A and Linear B.

One reason is that it is already known to hold in many cases between Linear B and the Cypriot syllabary, another script which descends from Linear A. This fact is taken as evidence that these signs were inherited by both scripts along with their Linear A phonetic values. For example, the Linear B 𐀮 and Cypriot 𐠩 both have the sound value "se", suggesting that the homomorphic Linear A sign 𐘈 had the same sound value. Similarly, since Linear B 𐀞 and Cypriot 𐠞 were both pronounced "pa", the homomorphic Linear A sign 𐘂 is likely to have had a similar pronunciation. Among the core syllabic signs, roughly 10 show clear signs of such parallels across the scripts, though additional correspondences have been proposed on the basis of less secure paleographic evidence.

Another reason is that many Linear B sign sequences that denote toponyms and personal names appear in Linear A documents as well. This fact would be explained if these sign sequences were pronounced similarly. For example, the Linear A toponym 𐘂𐘚𐘄 would be read as pa-i-to, corresponding to the placename Phaistos attested in Linear B as 𐀞𐀂𐀵 Pa-i-to. Similar instances have been found for Linear A toponyms such as 𐘈𐘄𐘚𐘱 (SE-TO-I-JA) and 𐘲𐘸𐘭𐘳 (SU-KI-RI-TA), and for personal names such as 𐘀𐘚𐘢𐘳 (DA-I-PI-TA) and 𐘂𐘴𐘗 (PA-RA-NE). In some cases, Linear A names appear in Linear B with Greek case endings, for instance Linear A 𐘌𐘌𐘘 (QA-QA-RU) corresponding to Linear B 𐀣𐀣𐀫 (qa-qa-ro) and Linear A 𐘆𐘦𐘘 (DI-DE-RU to Linear B 𐀇𐀆𐀫 (di-de-ro). These shared words have been taken as evidence for shared sound values of the signs that appear in them.

Another reason is that Linear A words sometimes come in multiple variants whose differences would be phonologically motivated if Linear B sound values are assumed. For example, the Linear A word 𐘇𐘞𐘞𐘴𐘋 also comes in the variant 𐘱𐘞𐘞𐘴𐘋, differing only in its initial sign. The alternation between the initial signs would be explained if these signs had a systematic phonological relationship, similar to the method used by Alice Kober which led to the decipherment of Linear B. Such a relationship would exist if the Linear A signs 𐘇 and 𐘱 were pronounced as /a/ and /ja/ respectively, just like the homomorphic Linear B signs 𐀀 and 𐘱. In this case, the words would differ only in the presence of a /j-/ prefix, while the /a/ vowel would be preserved. Similar arguments have been made based on other seemingly morphologically related pairs.

However, in particular cases scholars have identified reasons to expect divergence in pronunciation between Linear A and Linear B. Some scholars have argued that Minoan did not really have the vowel /o/ as a phoneme, that it may not have had the labialised velars that the /q/-signs express in Mycenaean, and that the only apparent voiced stop, /d/, was really a dental fricative in Minoan. The latter note is further supported by the principle that if a voicing contrast is used at all in a language, it normally runs right across the various categories of consonants.

The following table shows signs that are known to be syllabograms and for which provisional and approximate sound values are assumed primarily based on the known pronunciations of identical or similar signs in Linear B.

Syllabic signs of shape V, CV
	-a		-e		-i		-o		-u	
	𐘇	a *08	𐘡	e *38	𐘚	i *28	𐘵	o *61	𐘉	u *10
d-	𐘀	da *01	𐘦	de *45	𐘆	di *07	Disputed.𐙀? ?	do -*79?	𐘬	du *51
j-	𐘱	ja *57	𐘧	je *46	–	–	Disputed.	jo	Disputed.	ju
k-	𐘾	ka *77	𐘥	ke *44	𐘸	ki *67	𐘺	ko *70	𐙂	ku *81
m-	𐙁	ma *80	𐘋	me *13	𐘻	mi *73	Disputed. 𐙗? ?	mo *303?	𐘕	mu *23
n-	𐘅	na *06	𐘗	ne *24	𐘝	ni *30	Disputed. , ?	no *28,28B?	𐘯	nu *55
p-	𐘂	pa *03	-	–	𐘢	pi *39	𐘊	po *11	𐘫	pu *50
q-	𐘌	qa *16	𐘿	qe *78	𐘏	qi *21	-	–	-	–
r-	𐘴	ra *60	𐘙	re *27	𐘭	ri *53	𐘁	ro *02	𐘘	ru *26
s-	𐘞	sa *31	𐘈	se *09	𐘤	si *41	Disputed.	so	𐘲	su *58
t-	𐘳	ta *59	𐘃	te *04	𐘠	ti *37	𐘄	to *05	𐘹	tu *69
w-	𐘮	wa *54	Disputed.	–	𐘣	wi *40	Disputed.	wo	-	-
z-	𐘍	za *17	𐘼	ze *74	–	–	𐘎	zo *20	Disputed. 𐙀? ?	zu *79

While many of those assumed to be syllabic signs are similar to ones in Linear B, approximately 80% of Linear A's logograms are unique; the difference in sound values between Linear A and Linear B signs ranges from 9% to 13%.

=== Underlying language ===
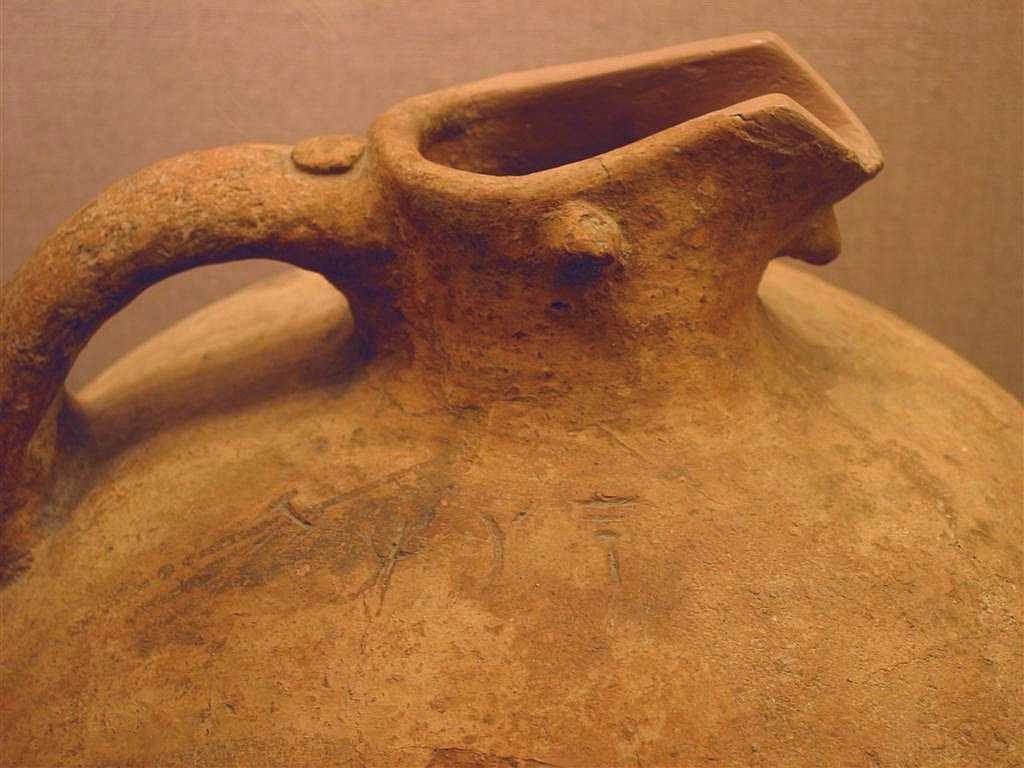
Linear A incised on a jug, also found in Akrotiri

Linear A does not encode any known language. The placeholder term Minoan language is often used, though it is not certain that the texts are all in the same language.

Although an approximate phoneme inventory for Minoan can be inferred from the Linear A sign inventory, the phonology of the language has been subject to debate, and one scholar refers to its reconstruction as "the thirteenth Labour of Herakles". In older work, Minoan was often regarded as having a three vowel system, since Linear A shares Linear B's /i/, /u/, and /a/ series, but not all of the /o/ and /e/ signs, and those it does have occur much less frequently. However, more recent work has questioned this assumption, noting that Linear A sound values involving /o/ and /e/ are supported by comparative evidence from Cypriot and also from their occurrence in shared placenames such as Pa-i-to and Se-to-i-ja.

Similarly, in older work, Minoan was assumed to have a predominantly open syllable structure and few consonant clusters, reflecting the inventory of syllables available in Linear A. This view was based on the assumption that Linear A would have been developed in order to closely match Minoan phonology, and that the defectiveness of Linear B would have resulted from the process of adapting the script to write Greek. However, more recent work has questioned this assumption based on precedents from other defective scripts as well as potential evidence of partial or plene spelling in Linear A itself, such as the placename 𐘂𐘚𐘄 (PA-I-TO) which would likely have contained an unwritten /s/ sound as in its later pronunciation as "Phaistos".

By identifying systematic patterns of similarities and variations across inscriptions, scholars have been able to make inferences about the syntax and morphology of the Minoan language. Comparison of formulaic inscriptions on libation vessels suggests that the language had Verb Subject Object word order. Minoan appears to have been an agglutinative language, making copious use of prefixes and suffixes. Among these, the suffixes -RU and -RE appear to be case markers, while J- is a prefix meaning something like "from" or "of", and -JA appears to be a derivational suffix used to form adjectives.

Internal analysis of texts has been used to identify approximate meanings of certain words. Among these, the most secure is the word 𐙂𐘘 (KU-RO) meaning "total". The meaning of this word was inferred much as 𐀵𐀰/𐀵𐀭 (to-so/to-sa) was for Linear B, from the fact that it regularly occurs at the ends of tallied lists, preceding a numeral representing the sum of the tallies in the list. Similarly, the word stem 𐘚𐝥 (I-*301) is believed to mean "to give" or "to dedicate" based on its use across variants of the Libation Formula. In some cases, additional inferences can be made based on parallels between internal evidence from Linear A and loanwords in later Greek. For instance, the Linear A logogram for wool 𐛢 is a composite of the syllabic signs 𐙁 (MA) and 𐘘 (RU), a fact which on its own would suggest "maru" or "malu" as a potential Minoan word for wool. This inference is regarded as more secure because this term seems to appear as a loanword in Greek as μαλλός (mallos). Moreover, the same sign appears in Linear B, though it is sometimes written as a composite of 𐀔 ("ma") and 𐀫 ("ro") instead, seemingly reflecting an adaptation of the word to Greek phonology.

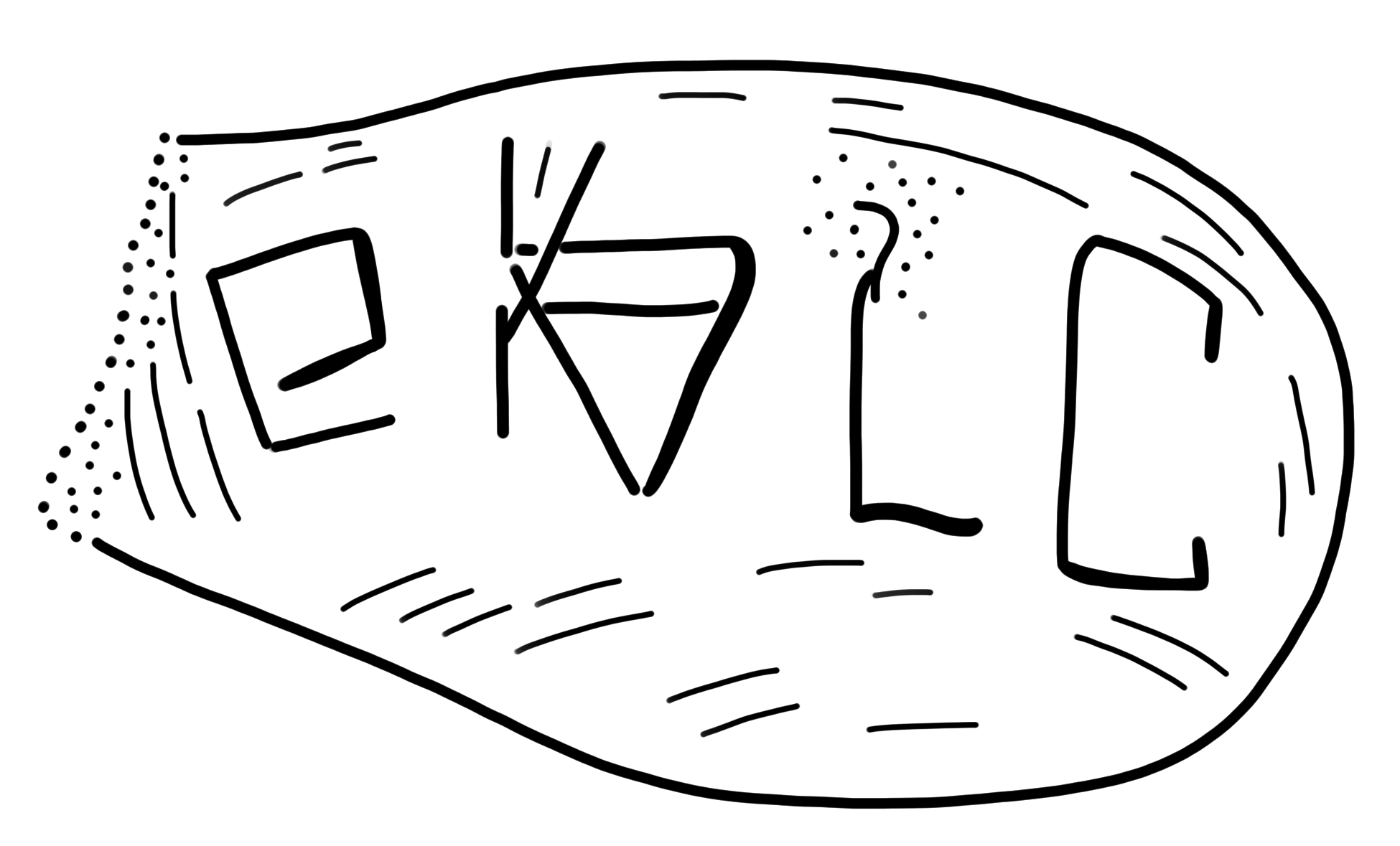
A clay nodule from Phaistos inscribed with the toponym SU-KI-RI-TA, also known from later Linear B texts.

Given what is known about the language, Minoan does not appear to be a member of any recognized known language family. Some scholars have explored potential parallels with Anatolian languages such as Luwian and Lycian, as well as with Semitic languages such as Phoenician and Ugaritic. However, even if these connections are not coincidental, it would be unclear whether Minoan is related to one of these languages or if the parallels arose through language contact.

== Unicode ==
The Linear A alphabet (U+10600–U+1077F) was added to the Unicode Standard in June 2014 with the release of version 7.0. Current as of the latest Unicode version, 15.1.

Linear A^{[1]}^{[2]} Official Unicode Consortium code chart (PDF)
	0	1	2	3	4	5	6	7	8	9	A	B	C	D	E	F
U+1060x	𐘀	𐘁	𐘂	𐘃	𐘄	𐘅	𐘆	𐘇	𐘈	𐘉	𐘊	𐘋	𐘌	𐘍	𐘎	𐘏
U+1061x	𐘐	𐘑	𐘒	𐘓	𐘔	𐘕	𐘖	𐘗	𐘘	𐘙	𐘚	𐘛	𐘜	𐘝	𐘞	𐘟
U+1062x	𐘠	𐘡	𐘢	𐘣	𐘤	𐘥	𐘦	𐘧	𐘨	𐘩	𐘪	𐘫	𐘬	𐘭	𐘮	𐘯
U+1063x	𐘰	𐘱	𐘲	𐘳	𐘴	𐘵	𐘶	𐘷	𐘸	𐘹	𐘺	𐘻	𐘼	𐘽	𐘾	𐘿
U+1064x	𐙀	𐙁	𐙂	𐙃	𐙄	𐙅	𐙆	𐙇	𐙈	𐙉	𐙊	𐙋	𐙌	𐙍	𐙎	𐙏
U+1065x	𐙐	𐙑	𐙒	𐙓	𐙔	𐙕	𐙖	𐙗	𐙘	𐙙	𐙚	𐙛	𐙜	𐙝	𐙞	𐙟
U+1066x	𐙠	𐙡	𐙢	𐙣	𐙤	𐙥	𐙦	𐙧	𐙨	𐙩	𐙪	𐙫	𐙬	𐙭	𐙮	𐙯
U+1067x	𐙰	𐙱	𐙲	𐙳	𐙴	𐙵	𐙶	𐙷	𐙸	𐙹	𐙺	𐙻	𐙼	𐙽	𐙾	𐙿
U+1068x	𐚀	𐚁	𐚂	𐚃	𐚄	𐚅	𐚆	𐚇	𐚈	𐚉	𐚊	𐚋	𐚌	𐚍	𐚎	𐚏
U+1069x	𐚐	𐚑	𐚒	𐚓	𐚔	𐚕	𐚖	𐚗	𐚘	𐚙	𐚚	𐚛	𐚜	𐚝	𐚞	𐚟
U+106Ax	𐚠	𐚡	𐚢	𐚣	𐚤	𐚥	𐚦	𐚧	𐚨	𐚩	𐚪	𐚫	𐚬	𐚭	𐚮	𐚯
U+106Bx	𐚰	𐚱	𐚲	𐚳	𐚴	𐚵	𐚶	𐚷	𐚸	𐚹	𐚺	𐚻	𐚼	𐚽	𐚾	𐚿
U+106Cx	𐛀	𐛁	𐛂	𐛃	𐛄	𐛅	𐛆	𐛇	𐛈	𐛉	𐛊	𐛋	𐛌	𐛍	𐛎	𐛏
U+106Dx	𐛐	𐛑	𐛒	𐛓	𐛔	𐛕	𐛖	𐛗	𐛘	𐛙	𐛚	𐛛	𐛜	𐛝	𐛞	𐛟
U+106Ex	𐛠	𐛡	𐛢	𐛣	𐛤	𐛥	𐛦	𐛧	𐛨	𐛩	𐛪	𐛫	𐛬	𐛭	𐛮	𐛯
U+106Fx	𐛰	𐛱	𐛲	𐛳	𐛴	𐛵	𐛶	𐛷	𐛸	𐛹	𐛺	𐛻	𐛼	𐛽	𐛾	𐛿
U+1070x	𐜀	𐜁	𐜂	𐜃	𐜄	𐜅	𐜆	𐜇	𐜈	𐜉	𐜊	𐜋	𐜌	𐜍	𐜎	𐜏
U+1071x	𐜐	𐜑	𐜒	𐜓	𐜔	𐜕	𐜖	𐜗	𐜘	𐜙	𐜚	𐜛	𐜜	𐜝	𐜞	𐜟
U+1072x	𐜠	𐜡	𐜢	𐜣	𐜤	𐜥	𐜦	𐜧	𐜨	𐜩	𐜪	𐜫	𐜬	𐜭	𐜮	𐜯
U+1073x	𐜰	𐜱	𐜲	𐜳	𐜴	𐜵	𐜶									
U+1074x	𐝀	𐝁	𐝂	𐝃	𐝄	𐝅	𐝆	𐝇	𐝈	𐝉	𐝊	𐝋	𐝌	𐝍	𐝎	𐝏
U+1075x	𐝐	𐝑	𐝒	𐝓	𐝔	𐝕										
U+1076x	𐝠	𐝡	𐝢	𐝣	𐝤	𐝥	𐝦	𐝧								
U+1077x																
Notes 1.As of Unicode version 18.0 2.Grey areas indicate non-assigned code points

== See also ==
- Aegean numerals
- Cypro-Minoan syllabary
- Phaistos Disc
- Arkalochori Axe
