= Phaistos =

Ancient Greek city in Crete

- Φαιστός (Greek); Pa-i-to
- Phaestus
- 35°03′05″N 24°48′49″E
- Type: Minoan palace and city
- Periods: Late Neolithic to Late Bronze Age
- Cultures: Minoan
- Location: Faistos, Heraklion, Crete, Greece
- Region: The eastern point of a ridge overlooking Messara Plain to the east

History
- Built: First settlement dates to about 3000 BCE. First palace dates to about 1850 BCE. New palace dates to around 1700 BCE

Site notes
- Material: Trimmed blocks of limestone and alabaster, mudbrick, rubble, wood
- Area: 8,400 m^{2} (90,000 sq ft) for the palace. The city extended a few km into the valley below.
- Excavation dates: 1894, 1900–1920, 1950–1966, 2000–2004, 2007–present
- Archaeologists: Antonio Taramelli, Federico Halbherr, Luigi Pernier, Antonio Minto, Doro Levi, Vincenzo La Rosa, Fausto Longo
- Condition: Tamped soil, stone walkways, hand rails, lightly roofed areas
- Management: 23rd Ephorate of Prehistoric and Classical Antiquities
- Public access: Yes

UNESCO World Heritage Site
- Part of: Minoan Palatial Centres
- Criteria: Cultural: ii, iii, iv, vi
- Reference: 1733-002
- Inscription: 2025 (47th Session)

Phaistos (Greek: Φαιστός, pronounced [feˈstos]; Ancient Greek: Φαιστός, pronounced [pʰai̯stós], Linear B: 𐀞𐀂𐀵 Pa-i-to; Linear A: 𐘂𐘚𐘄 Pa-i-to), also transliterated as Phaestos, Festos and Latin Phaestus, is a Bronze Age archaeological site at modern Faistos, a municipality in south central Crete. It is notable for the remains of a Minoan palace and the surrounding town.

Ancient Phaistos was located about 5.6 km (3.5 mi) east of the Mediterranean Sea and 62 km (39 mi) south of Heraklion. Phaistos was one of the largest cities of Minoan Crete. The name Phaistos survives from ancient Greek references to a city on Crete of that name at or near the current ruins.

== History ==
=== Bronze Age ===
Phaistos was first inhabited around 3600 BCE, slightly later than other early sites such as Knossos. During the Early Minoan period, the site's hills were terraced and monumental buildings were constructed on them. Like other large Minoan cities, there was a palace that was built in an area that had been used earlier for communal feasting. The palace was built on a hill in the East and an acropolis was built on a hill in the West. The first palace was built in the Middle Minoan IB period, around 2000 BCE. The initial palace was destroyed and rebuilt three times in a period of about three centuries. The palace history is divided into three construction phases because of its reconstructions. The palace was destroyed around 1400 BCE and not rebuilt. This destruction may have been caused by a large earthquake.

Phaistos was interconnected to various other residences, most notably Hagia Triada and Gortyn. Hagia Triada has a smaller palace which may have been connected to the rulers of Phaistos as a vacation residence. Hagia Triada's port and relative closeness to Phaistos may have allowed for long distance trade and shared economic and political activity. Phaistos was one of the 3 largest cities of Minoan Crete along with Knossos and Malia. A road system connects the cities and the road from Phaistos to Knossos seems to be the most prominent. This indicates that trade and transportation between the two cities was important, and that Phaistos was a valuable trade partner.

Several artifacts with Linear A inscriptions were excavated at this site. The name of the site also appears in partially deciphered Linear A texts and may be similar to Mycenaean 'PA-I-TO' as written on 62 Linear B tablets found at Knossos. Several kouloura structures (subsurface pits) have been found at Phaistos. Pottery has been recovered at Phaistos from in the Middle and Late Minoan periods. Bronze Age works from Phaistos include bridge spouted bowls, eggshell cups, tall jars and large pithoi. Grape pips have been found in storage vessels at Phaistos, indicating the production of wine.

=== Classical and Roman era ===
The site was reinhabited during the Geometric Age (8th century BCE). Phaistos had its own currency, the stater. The city also created an alliance with other autonomous Cretan cities, and with the king of Pergamon Eumenes II. Around the end of the 3rd century BCE, Phaistos was destroyed by the Gortynians and since then has not been present in the history of Crete. Scotia Aphrodite and goddess Leto, who was also called Phytia, were worshiped there. Epimenides, the wise man invited by the Athenians to clean the city after the Cylonian affair (Cyloneio agos) in the 6th century BCE, was a Cretan who may have descended from the people of Phaistos.

=== Contemporary period ===
In 2025, the site was designated as a World Heritage Site by UNESCO.

== Palace ==
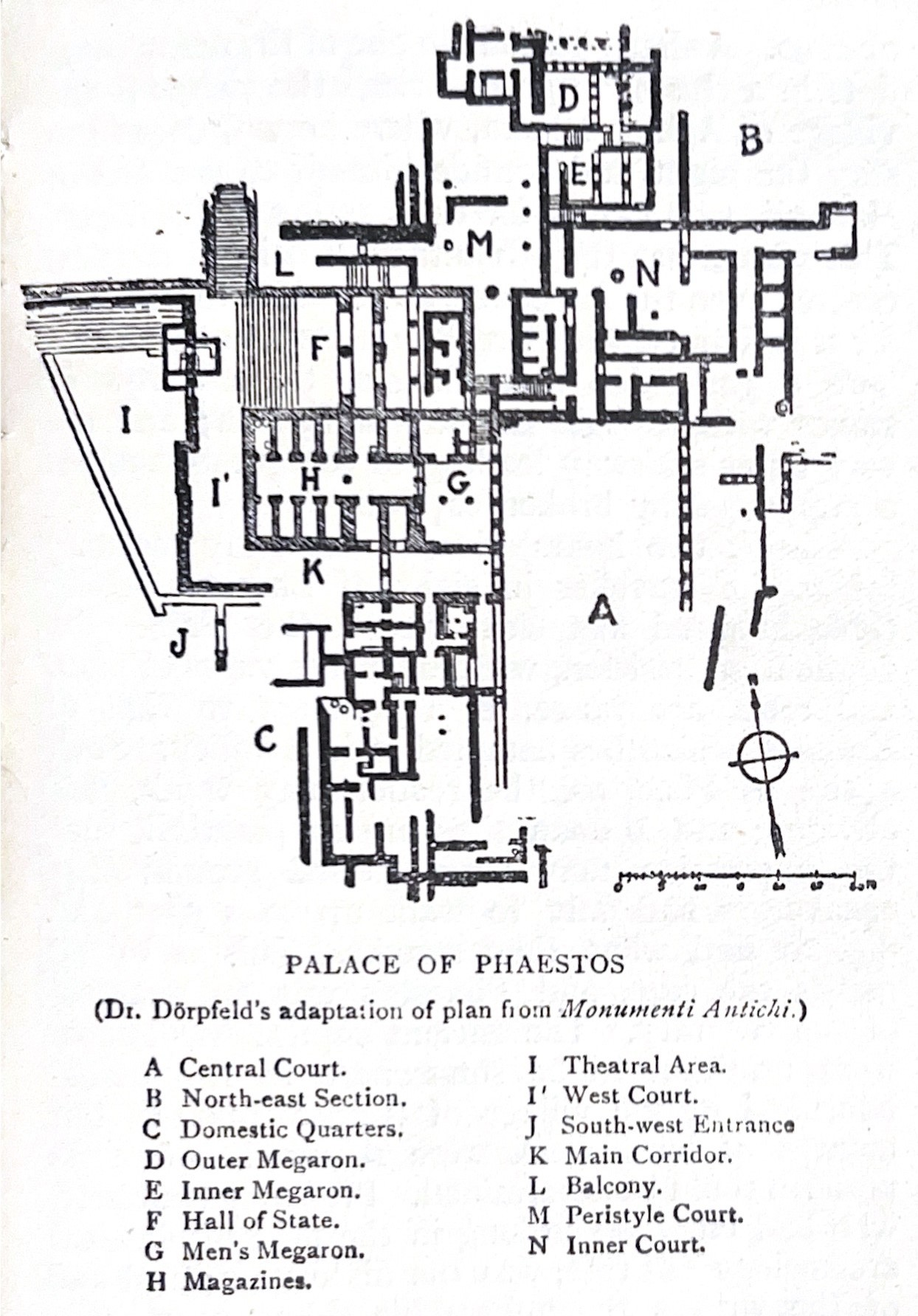
A layout of the palace with descriptors. Further excavation has revealed more of the site to the South and East.

Phaistos is home to one of the structures commonly known as a Minoan Palace. The structure of Minoan palaces differs from actual palaces and have been proven to serve more purposes, but the name has stuck. These structures are complex buildings that have multiple uses. The palace at Phaistos seemed to have religious and political purposes as well as sections for storage, housing, and a theater.

The Minoan Palace at Phaistos was destroyed and rebuilt multiple times. The earliest iteration of the palace was used as a foundation for the newer reconstructions. The new reconstructions of the palace shifted around slightly eastward of the original palace. The reconstructions of the palace expanded on the first build and were made on multiple vertical levels that were interconnected by halls and stairs. The palace was around 2/3 as large as the palace at Knossos. The first level contained the theater area and some shrines. The theater was larger than the one at Knossos. The second level consisted of servant and guest rooms as well as the commissariat quarter. Above this was the primary royal apartments. The fourth and final level was made up of the Hall of the State and balconies that overlooked the palace and its exterior.

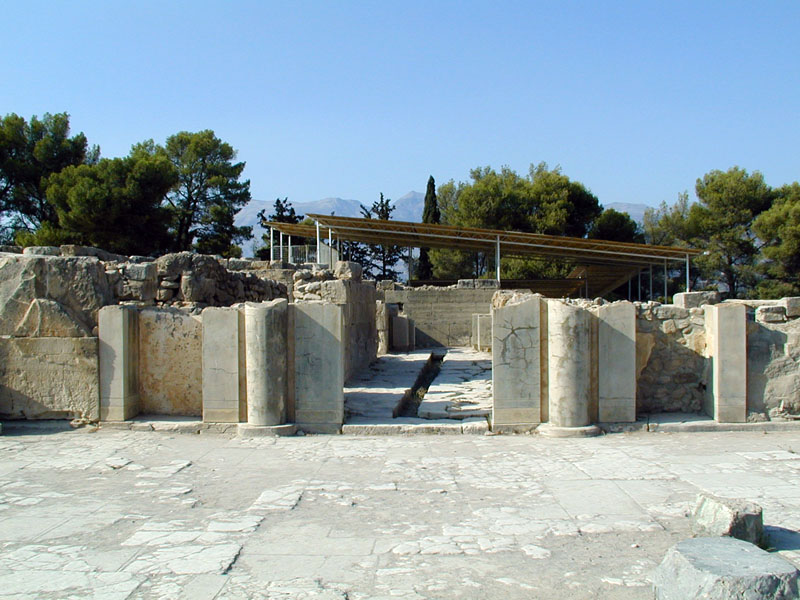
View of the entrance to the main section of the Phaistos palace.

The levels of the theater area, in conjunction with two staircases, gave access to the main hall of the propylaea through large doors. A twin gate led directly to the central courtyard through a wide street. The floors and walls of the interior rooms were decorated with plates of sand and white gypsum stone. The upper floors of the west sector had spacious ceremonial rooms.

The entrance from the central courtyard led to the royal apartments in the northern section of the palace, with a view of the tops of Psiloritis (Mount Ida). The rooms were constructed from alabaster and other materials. The rooms for princes were smaller and less luxurious than the rooms of the royal departments.

A temple to Rhea was found in the palace. The temple is located in the Southern section of the palace. This temple was connected with the ekdysia, which is a ritual practiced in Phaistos. The temple was built after the Geometric age.

== Excavation ==
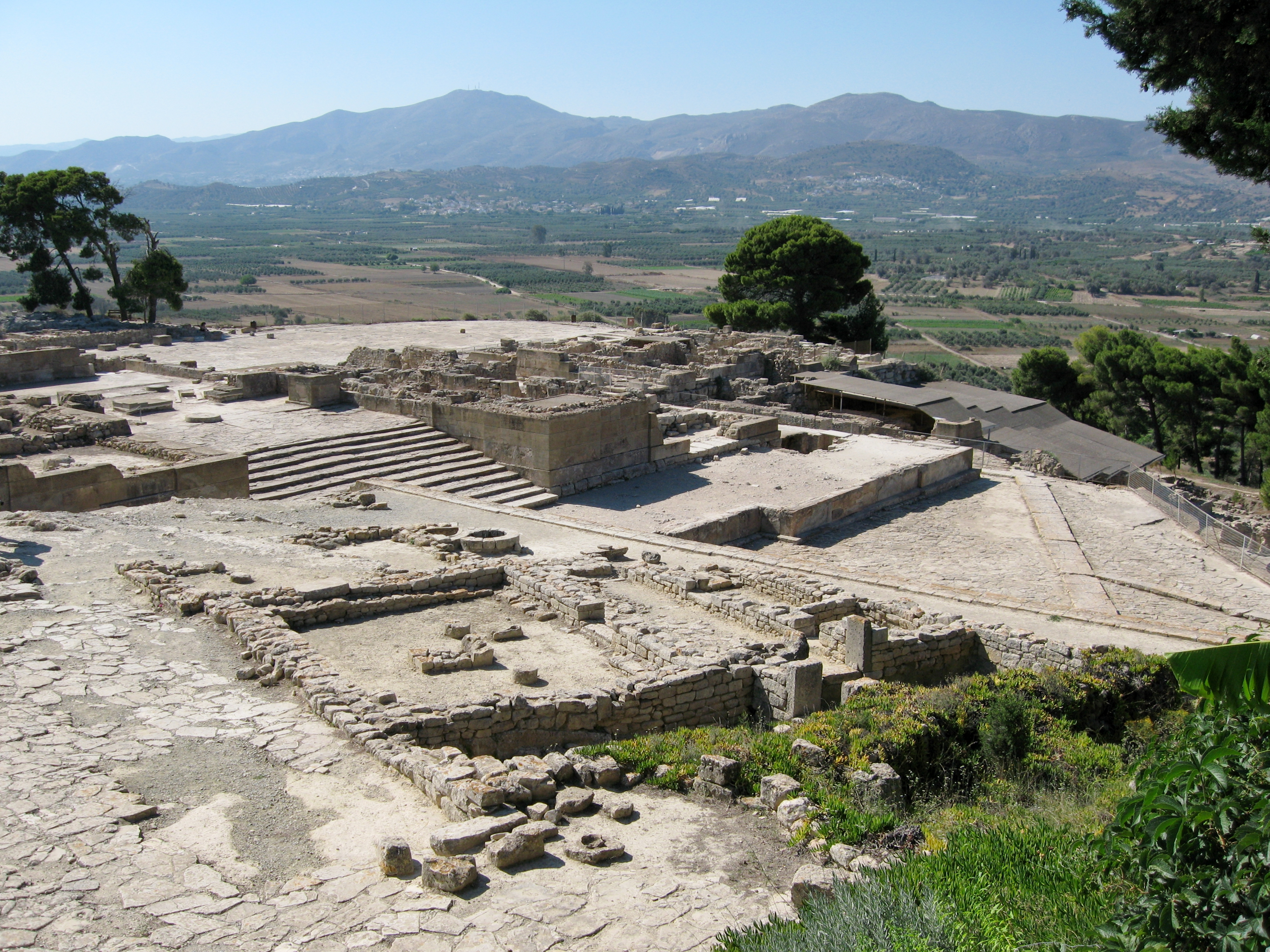
View of Phaistos palace section showing a portion of the excavated area.

Phaistos was located in 1853 by Thomas Abel Brimage Spratt, a ship captain who surveyed sites around the Mediterranean. Spratt triangulated the location of Phaistos to a hill then known as Kastri ("fort", "small castle") using the locations or Gortyn, Matala, and the coast. A village of 16 houses remained on the ridge, but the vestiges of fortification walls indicated that a city had existed there.

In 1894, Antonio Taramelli excavated pottery at Phaistos at the behest of Federico Halbherr. Seal stones and cylinder seals were also found. From 1900 to 1904 Federico Halbherr and his student Luigi Pernier excavated at Phaistos. Occasional work continued at Phaistos until 1908 while Halbherr and Pernier excavated at the Minoan site of Hagia Triada, located about 3 kilometers away. Between 1909 and 1922 Antonio Minto excavated on the hill of Christos Effendi, especially the fortification walls there.

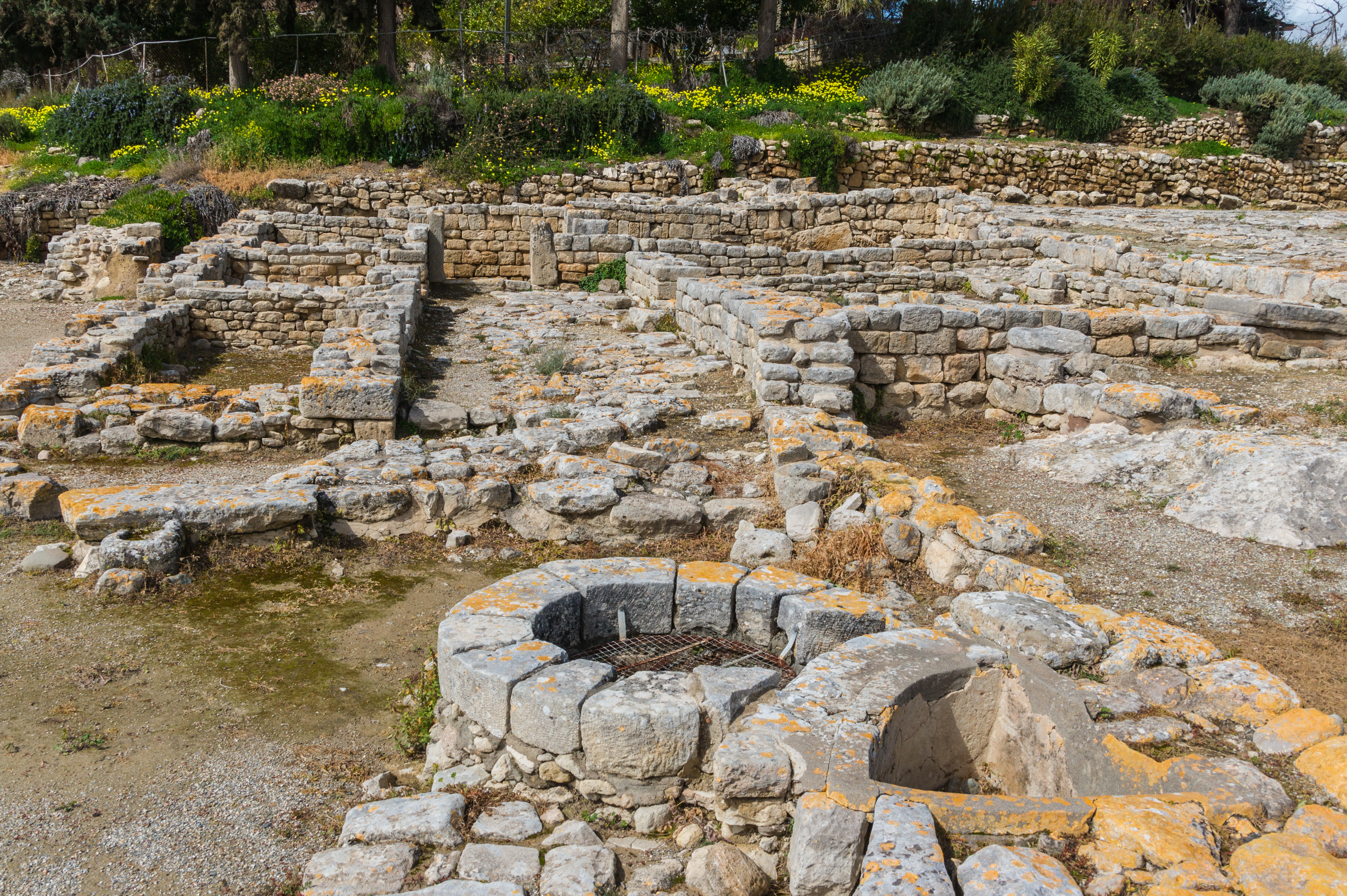
Excavated section of the Phaistos ruins

Between 1950 and 1966 an Italian School of Archaeology at Athens team led by Doro Levi worked at Phaistos. From 2000 to 2004 the effort was led by Vincenzo La Rosa. Beginning in 2007 the Phaistos Project (also Progetto festos), led by Fausto Longo, under the aegis of the Italian Archaeological School of Athens has worked at the site, mainly conducting surveys, restorations, and targeted excavations. To date 61 Linear A inscribed items have been found at Phaistos (26 tablets, 35 sealed documents). Also found were 12 sealed roundels (9 inscribed with Linear A characters) and thousands of sealings (including nodules).

In 1908, the Phaistos Disc was found in a basement room (Room 101), along with a Linear A tablet, on the northern side of the palace in a Middle Minoan IIIb level. The disc was found with assorted pottery that dates to approximately 1800 BCE, which was around when the palace could have been reconstructed. Finding artifacts in Phaistos is difficult because the Minoans thoroughly cleaned the original palace ruins before beginning the later iterations. This left few archaeological remains to be found in the palace.

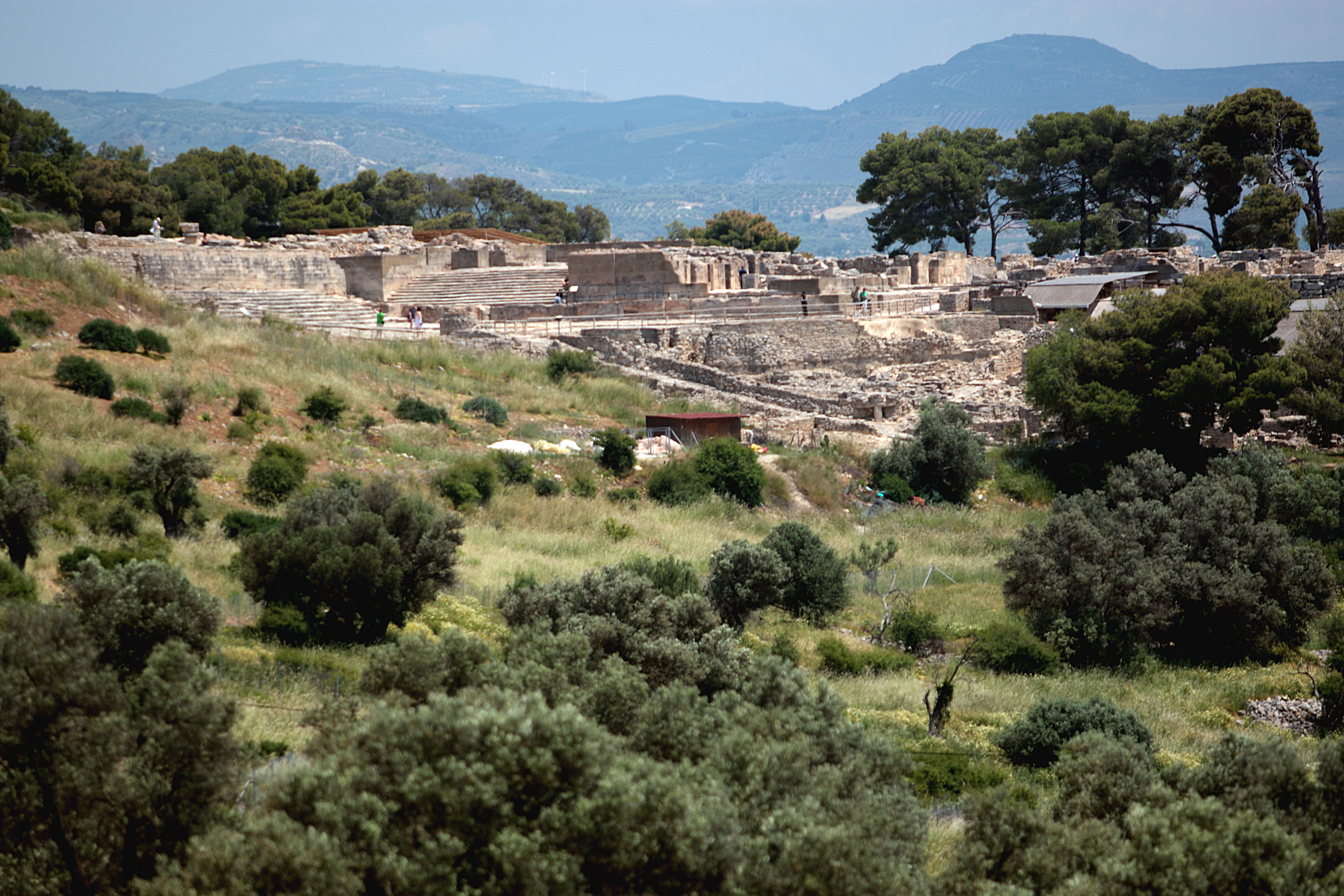
Bronze Age Phaistos viewed from south of the ridge

The tombs of the rulers of Phaistos were found in a cemetery near the palace remains. To the southwest of Phaistos, tholos tombs have been found and cemeteries were found to the northwest. Some items found in tombs at Phaistos have been declared as bronze armor scraps. Originally, tombs were built for communal use but after the 400 BCE, the use of small group and family tombs became common practice. A clay model found at one of the larger tombs depicts couples at altars with offerings. The details of this model have been likened to the Hagia Triada sarcophagus.

Pottery including polychrome items and embossing in imitation of metal work has been found at Phaistos. This imitation came in the form of making pottery extremely thin, being likened to eggshell. This pottery also mimicked the shapes that metal items were made in. Many of the pottery items had fluting or embossments. This metallurgy replication was mostly found in small vases and cups. Minoan pottery quality changed around 1800 BCE, and shiny vibrant colors were replaced by multiple dull colors.

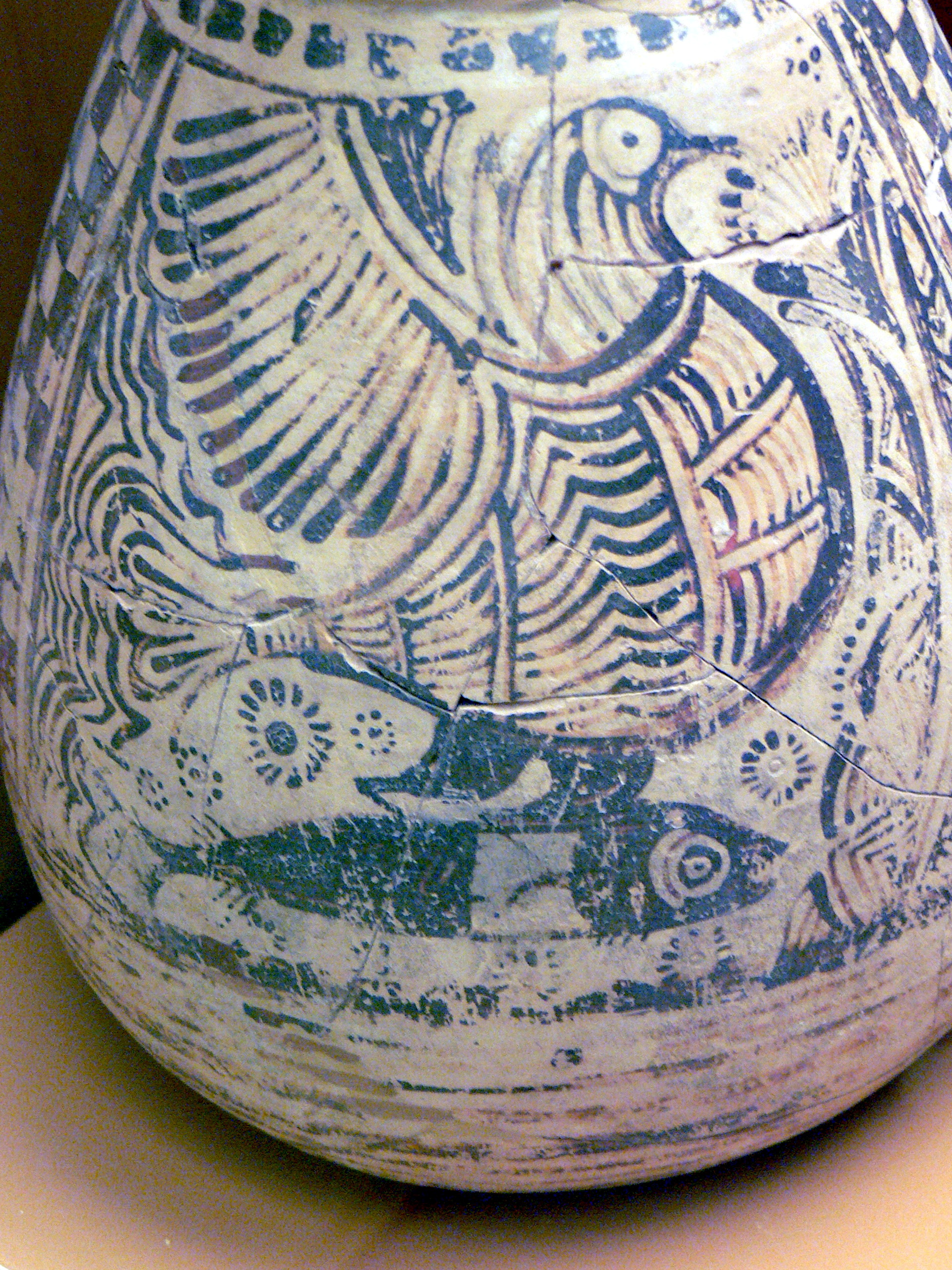
Bird clasping a fish. Decoration of a clay alabastron from Kalyvia, Phaistos, Crete. Early postpalatial period
(1350–1300 BCE)

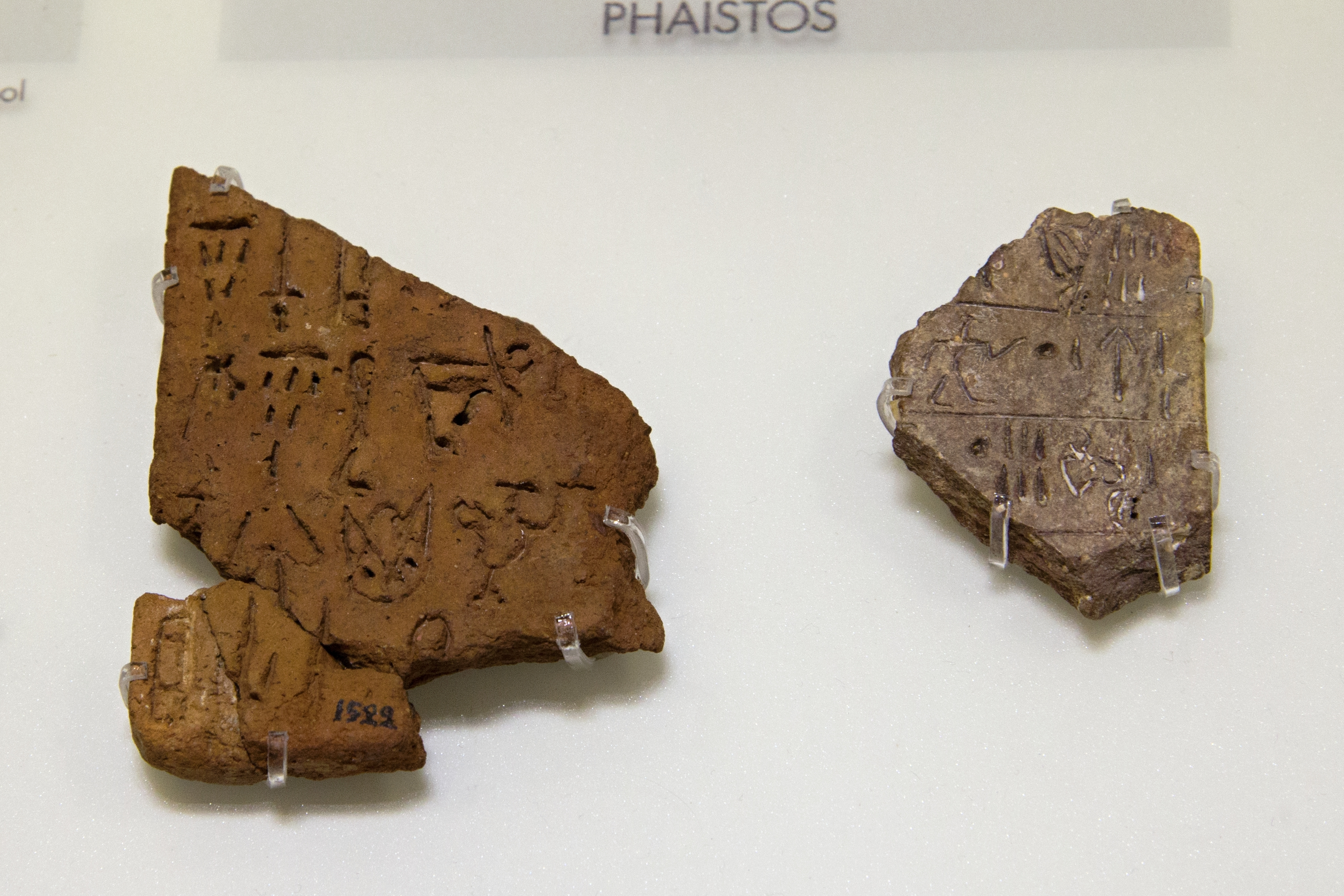
Fragments from Phaistos showing Linear A script (1850-1450 BCE)

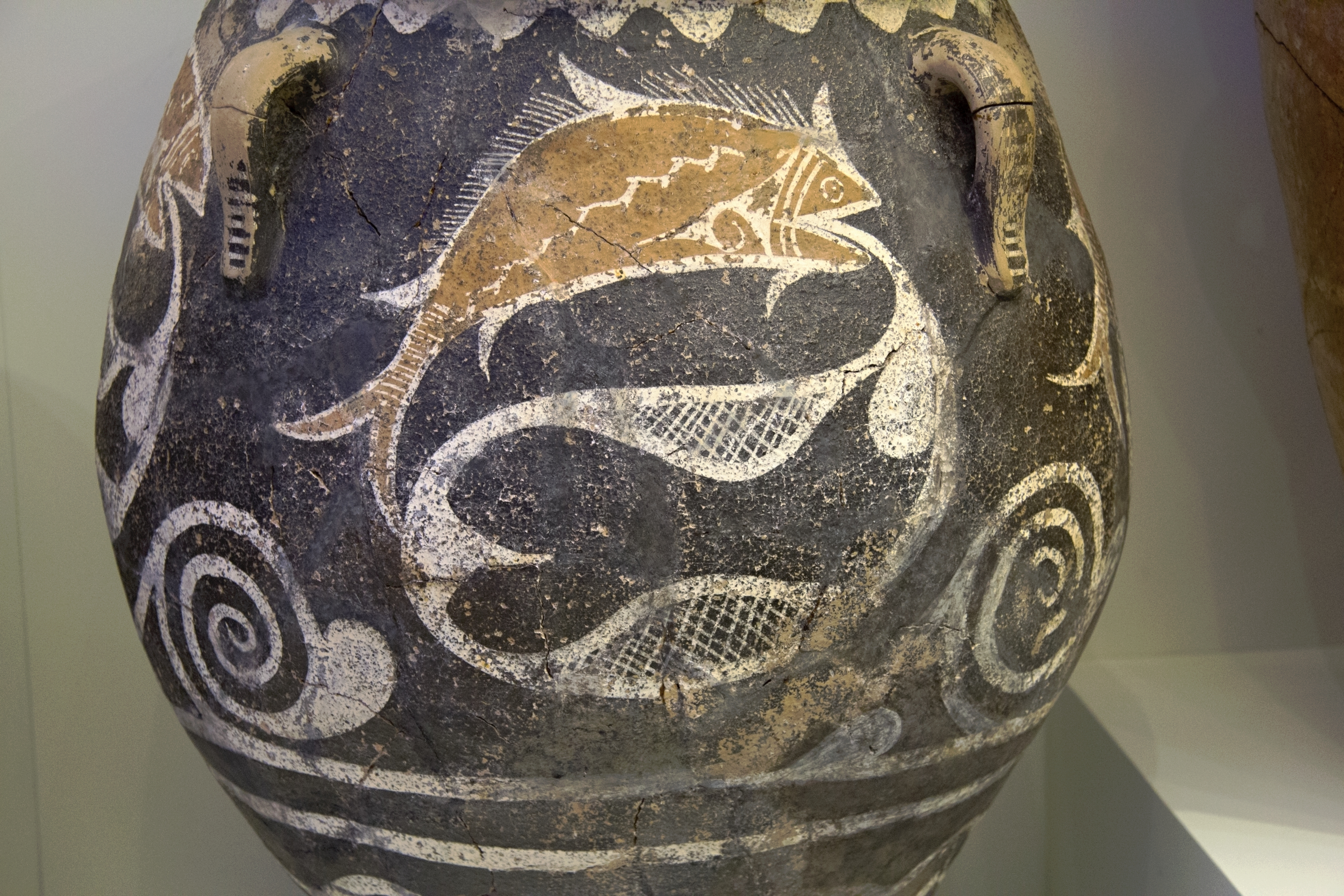
Pithos from Phaistos depicting fish (1800-1700 BCE)

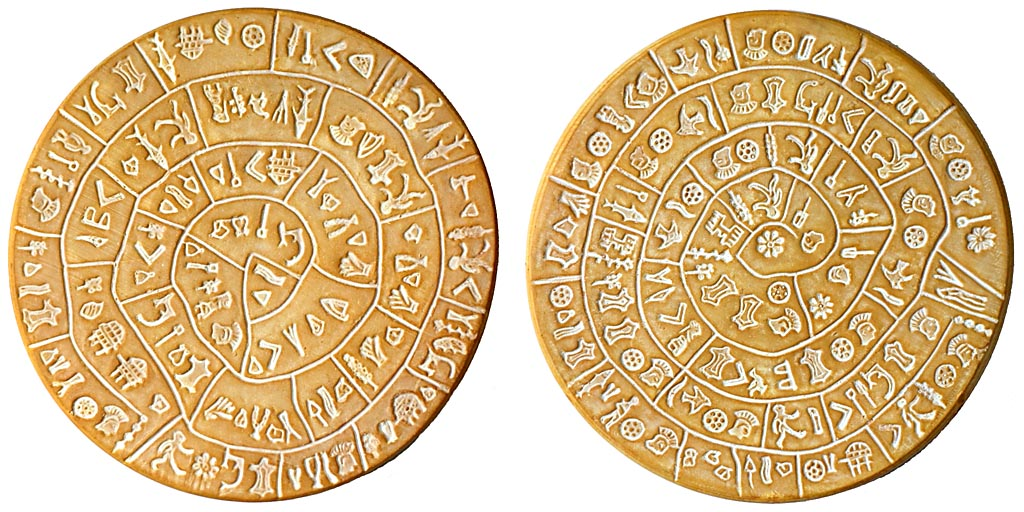
Both sides of the Phaistos disc

== In literature and myth ==
References to Phaistos in ancient Greek literature are quite infrequent. Phaistos is referenced by Homer, in the Iliad, as "well populated", and the Homeric epics indicate its participation in the Trojan War. The historian Diodorus Siculus indicates that Phaistos, as well as Knossos and Kydonia, are the three towns founded by King Minos on Crete. However, Pausanias and Stephanus of Byzantium indicate that the founder of the city was Phaestos, son of Hercules or Ropalus. The city of Phaistos is associated with the mythical king of Crete Rhadamanthys.

== See also ==
- Amari Valley
- Hagia Triada
- Kamares Cave
- Kommos
- Monastiraki, Crete
- Gortyn
