= Italian School of Archaeology at Athens =

Archaeological institute operating in Athens, Greece

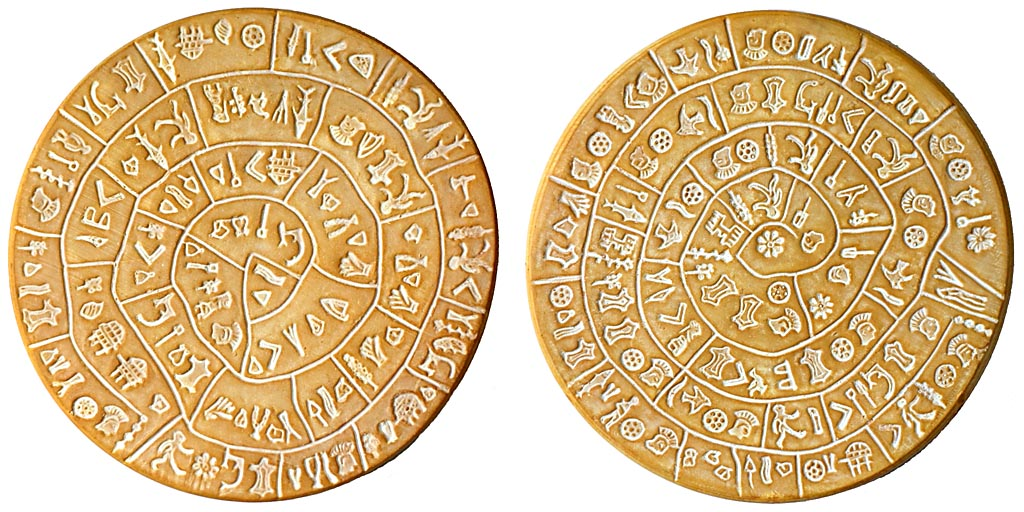
The Phaistos Disk, found during the Italian excavations at the Minoan Palace.

The Italian School of Archaeology at Athens (Italian: Scuola Archeologica Italiana di Atene (SAIA); Greek: Ἰταλικὴ Ἀρχαιολογικὴ Σχολὴ Ἀθηνῶν) is one of the 20 foreign archaeological institutes headquartered in Athens, Greece, with branch offices in Crete, Limnos and Rome.

Following earlier Italian research in Greece (as an archaeological "expedition" or "mission"), the School was established in 1909. The School operates a sizeable library in Athens. It has conducted archaeological surveys in Aigialeia (Arcadia) and Thouria (Messenia), and excavations on Lemnos at Poliochne, Hephaistia, and Chloe, as well as on Crete, at the Minoan Palace at Phaistos and the nearby Minoan town of Agia Triada, and also in the Archaic through Roman city of Gortyn.

== History ==
In 1884, when students of the third year of the Specialization School of Rome had already been conducting research in Greece, Federico Halbherr, a student of Domenico Comparetti, initiated the first modern Italian archaeological season in Greece with the discovery of the Gortyn Code. So on May 9, 1909, the Italian parliament approved the R.D. n. 373, according which "An Italian Institute of Archeology is established in Greece, with headquarters in Athens, with the name of «R. Italian archaeological school of Athens»" (Official Gazette 30 June 1909, n. 151). It replaced the previous Italian archaeological mission of Crete established ten years earlier. The first director was Halbherr's pupil, Luigi Pernier. The first works of the School focused on Crete, and above all on Gortyna, Priniàs, Festòs and Aghia Triada.

== Bibliography ==
- E. Korka et al. (eds.): Foreign Archaeological Schools in Greece, 160 Years, Athens, Hellenic Ministry of Culture, 2006.
