= Doro Levi =

Italian archaeologist (1898–1991)

Teodoro "Doro" Levi (1 June 1899 – 3 July 1991) was an Italian archaeologist who practiced in the Mediterranean countries in the 20th century. Specifically, Levi conducted excavations in Italy, Greece, and Turkey. From 1938 to 1945, Levi was a member of the Institute for Advanced Study in Princeton, New Jersey. Levi has published a number of technical manuscripts on archaeology such as Festos e la Civiltà Minoica, tavole I published in 1976. Some of Levi's most significant work was a long term excavation at Minoan Phaistos, which site is the second most significant Minoan settlement (following Knossos) and which has yielded important finds such as the Phaistos Disk and extensive Bronze Age pottery.
