= Messara Plain =

Alluvial plain in Southern Crete

Coordinates: 35°02′14″N 24°50′46″E

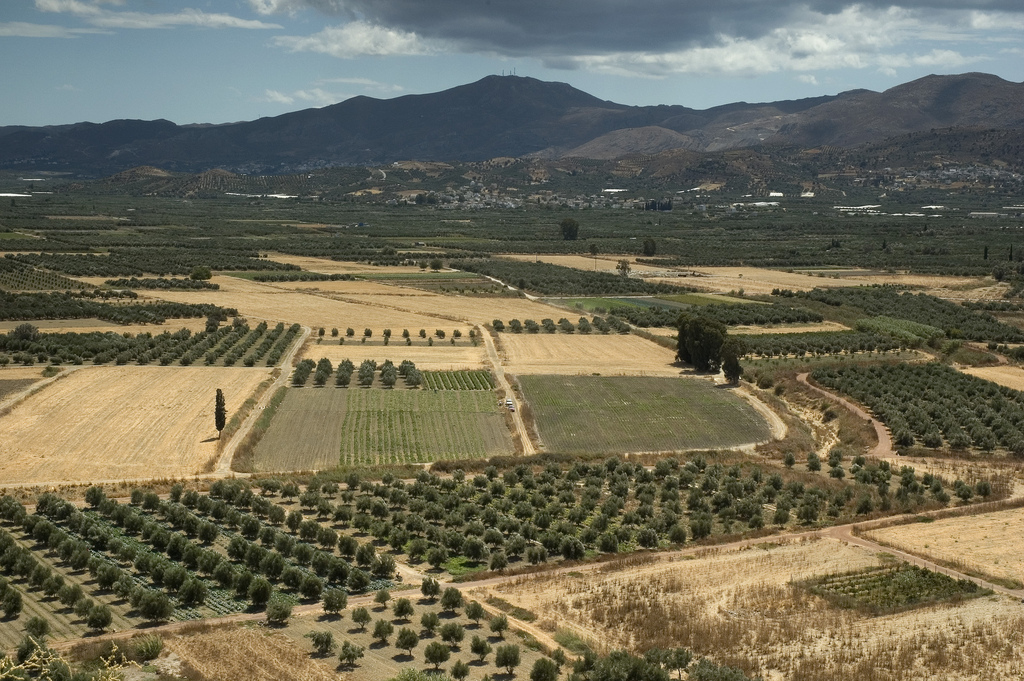
View of Messara from the hill of Phaestus

The Messara Plain or simply Messara (Greek: Μεσσαρά) is an alluvial plain in southern Crete, stretching about 50 km west-to-east and 7 km north-to-south, making it the largest plain in Crete.

On a hill at its west end are the ruins of Phaistos and Hagia Triada, near the middle are the ruins of the ancient city of Gortys.

Since 1500 BC the plain has extended by up to 6 km due to a buildup of alluvial sediment. Clays from Messara have been found to be the source of significant amounts of Minoan pottery; soil and rock types from the fringes of Messara, particularly the foothills of the Asterousia Mountains at the south and the foothills to the north within the Psiloritis Mountains.

In the Messara, olive trees, vineyards and horticultural crops are grown. Part of the products grown here are placed on the domestic market. Α substantial part of the produced olive oil is then exported to European markets. The Messara Plain is also home to the indigenous Messara horse.

== See also ==
- Early and simple domes
