= Hagia Triada =

Archaeological site in Greece

- 35°03′32″N 24°47′33″E
- Type: Minoan town and "palace"
- Cultures: Minoan
- Location: Faistos, Heraklion, Crete, Greece
- Region: Messara Plain

Site notes
- Excavation dates: 1902-1914, 1934-1936, 1939, 1950, 1977-present
- Archaeologists: Federico Halbherr, Luigi Pernier et al.
- Management: State
- Public access: Yes

Hagia Triada (also Haghia Triada, Hagia Triadha, Ayia Triada, Agia Triada), (Greek: [aˈʝia triˈaða]) is a Minoan archaeological site in Crete. The site includes the remains of an extensive settlement noted for its monumental NeoPalatial and PostPalatial period buildings especially the large Royal Villa. It is located in the Mesara Plain about three kilometers from the larger Palace of Phaistos, with which it appears to have had close political and economic ties. It is also nearby the Minoan harbor site of Kommos. Excavations at Hagia Triada have provided crucial evidence concerning Minoan everyday life.

Notable finds include the Hagia Triada sarcophagus and the "Harvester Vase". About 150 Linear A tablets were found, the largest cache at any Minoan site. Twenty three roundels (circular lumps of clay sealed on the edge) and a large number of nodules (clay lumps with 3 faces of which two had small inscriptions and one face a seal) were also found. All of the Linear A finds date to the Late Minoan IB period, before the site was destroyed by fire and then rebuilt.

After being found on 54 Linear B tablets (dated LM IIIA1 to LM IIIB) at Knossos, the name "pa-i-to" has been proposed for the ancient name of the nearby site of Phaistos. It has also been proposed that this name encompassed Haghia Triada as well. The ancient name of Hagia Triada is not yet known though "da-wo" has been proposed. The toponym "da-wo" appears on 46 Linear B tablets (dated LM IIIA1 to LM IIIB) at Knossos. It has been proposed as the name of Haghia Triada based on the large amount of grain storage shown which matches that excavated at the site. Scheria from the writing of Homer has also been suggested.

== History ==
Minoan chronology
Timespan	Period	
3100–2650 BC	EM I	Prepalatial
2650–2200 BC	EM II	Prepalatial
2200–2100 BC	EM III	Prepalatial
2100–1925 BC	MM IA	Prepalatial
1925–1875 BC	MM IB	Protopalatial
1875–1750 BC	MM II	Protopalatial
1750–1700 BC	MM III	Neopalatial
1700–1625 BC	LM IA	Neopalatial
1625–1470 BC	LM IB	Neopalatial
1470–1420 BC	LM II	Postpalatial
1420–1330 BC	LM IIIA	Postpalatial
1330–1200 BC	LM IIIB	Postpalatial
1200–1075 BC	LM IIIC	Postpalatial

The site was founded in the Early Minoan I (EM I) period. By the Middle Minoan IA (MM IA) period it is known to have had a cemetery with a large circular "tholos" tomb. The site grew rapidly during the MM IB to MM IIB period. With the Protopolatial period (c. 1925 BC) an extensive building program began which continued through the NeoPalatial period. Toward the end of the LM IB period (c. 1625–1470 BC) the site was destroyed by fire. It has been suggested that this destruction resulted from a series of large earthquakes. After that destruction monumental rebuilding occurred on a large scale. By sometime in the Late Minoan III (LM III) period the site came under Mycenae control. In the 13th century BC the site of Haghia Triada was destroyed and abandoned.

In the Mycenae Protogeometric period (c. 1050-900 BC) a sanctuary was established in the Regione dei Sacelli area, primarily at the Piazzale dei Sacelli. Numerous votive figurines were found there. After an occupation gap of three centuries the site came back into use in the Hellenistic period (323-30 BC) with several shrines being built. At that time the site was under the control of nearby Phaistos. The site was then abandoned in the 2nd century BC after Phaistos was destroyed by Gortyn. Later, after the island was conquered by Rome in 69 BC, a Roman villa was built at the site.

Nearby are two chapels: Hagia Triada in the deserted village and Hagios Georgios, built during the Venetian period.

== Archaeology ==
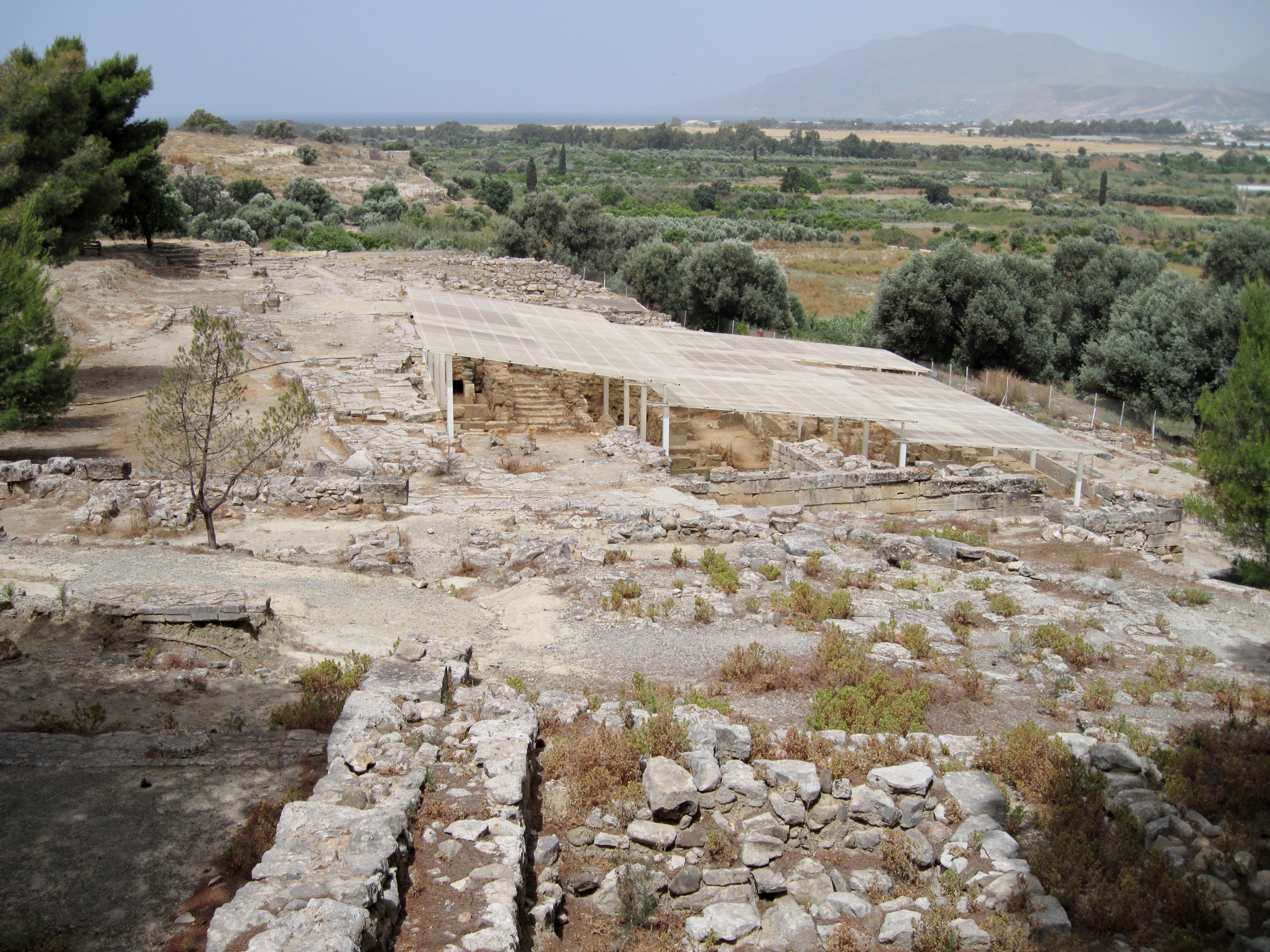
Archaeological site of Agia Triada

Hagia Triada is in south central Crete, 30–40 meters above sea level. It lies four kilometres west of Phaistos, which is situated at the western end of the Mesara Plain. The site was not a Minoan palace but an upscale town with some kind of local administration center. Though occupied earlier, most of the structural remains date to the Late Minoan period. The site is traditionally divided into a "Villa" (administrative center) and a "Village" area, at both of which Linear A inscriptions were found (all dated to the site's destruction by fire in Late Minoan IB). The site included three large storage magazines, which is taken to suggest trade. Linear A tablet find spots in the Villa were at northwest corner, southwest corner, and in two of the magazines (in one case found inside two pithoi and in the Village at the "Casa del Lebete". Although the site was partially rebuilt after the LM IB fire there was no evidence of administration from that point on.

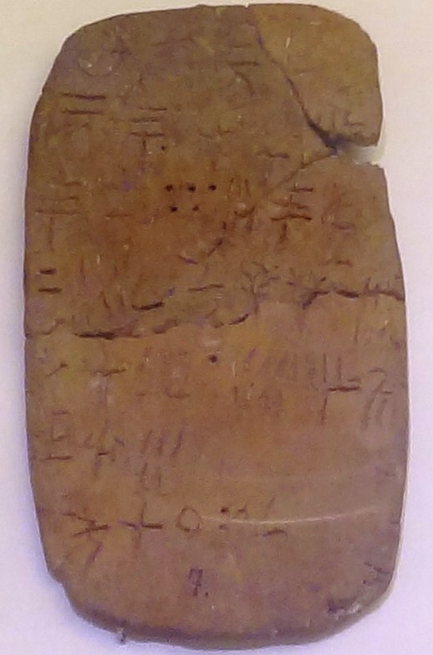
Linear A inscription on a clay tablet from Hagia Triada

The site was first identified in June 1900 by Luigi Pernier who was excavating at Phaistos at that time. While work proceeded at nearby Phaistos, Hagia Triada was excavated from 1902 to 1908 by a group from the Italian Scuola Archeologica Italiana di Atene, directed by Federico Halbherr and Luigi Pernier. The site includes a town and a miniature "palace", an ancient drainage system servicing both, and Early Minoan tholos tombs. The settlement was in use, in various forms, from Early Minoan I until the site's destruction by fire in Late Minoan IB.

Excavation resumed between 1910 and 1914, with the addition of Gaetano De Sanctis though the work from this effort is largely unpublished. In 1938 and 1959 Luisa Banti carried out limited excavation at the site. From 1970 until 1976 the site was excavated by Doro Levi and Clelia Laviosa. All of these excavations remain thinly published.

From 1977 to 2012 a team from the Italian Archaeological School at Athens led by Vincenzo La Rosa excavated at the site. Finds included a Late Minoan I kiln. Publication of this excavation, which focused on the ProtoPalatial levels, is in progress.

During the long course of excavation innumerable small finds have been collected. These include a large bronze cauldron, loom weights, obsidian tools, oil lamps, bronze bowls, 16 copper ingots and large quantities of jugs and drinking cups. For the early excavations the specific find spot is not always clear.

=== Hagia Triada sarcophagus ===
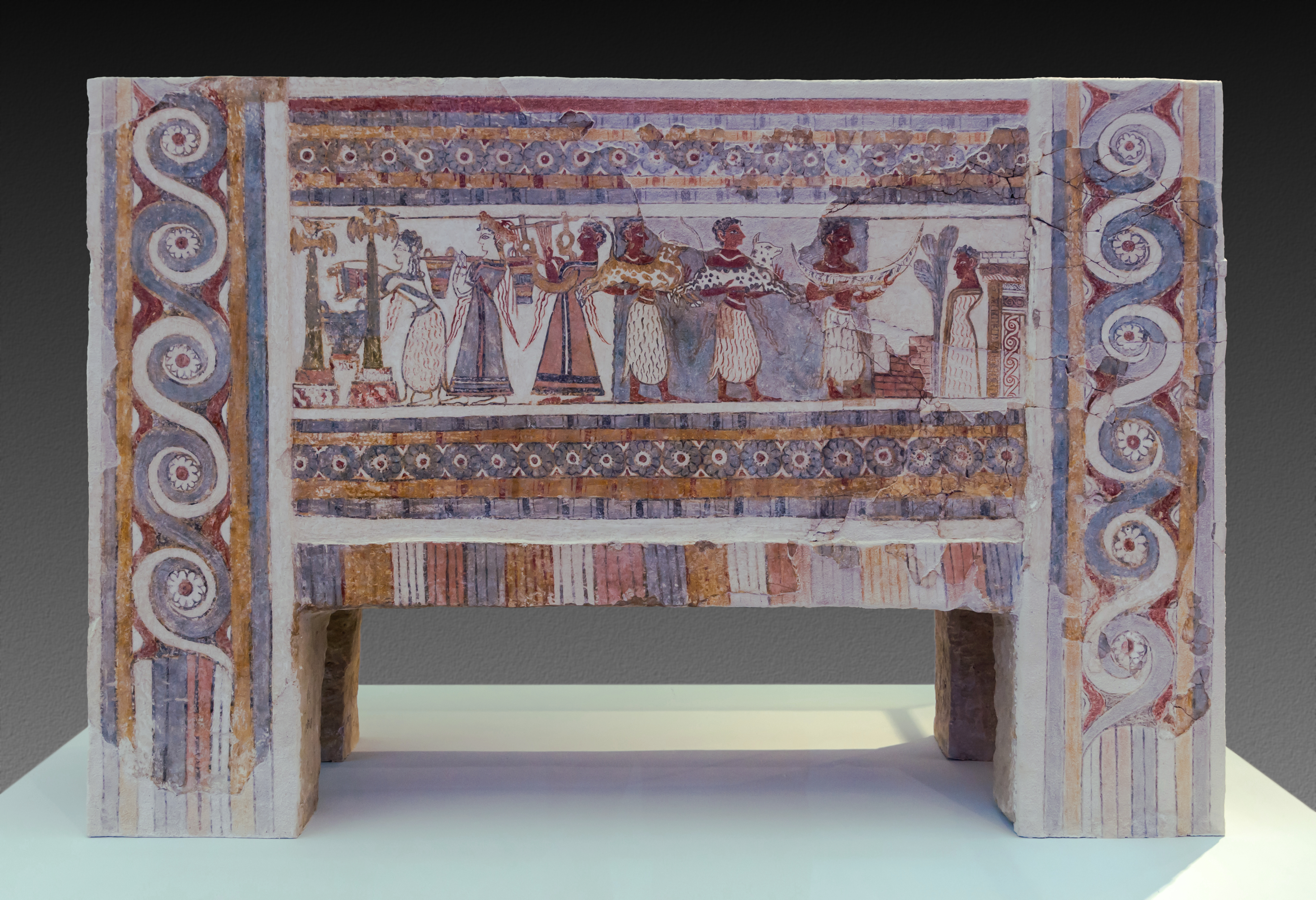
The famous Hagia Triada sarcophagus

In 1903 archaeologists unearthed the Hagia Triada sarcophagus painted with illuminating scenes of funerary rituals. It was found in a 3.8 meter by 4.2 meter tomb (Tomb 4) dated to the LM III period and contained two skulls. The tomb is also known as the Tomb of the Painted Sarcophagus and contained a 2nd, clay, sarcophagus (Larnax) and a stone and clay cup, two bronze razors, a clay figurine, and two seals. It has been suggested that a number of grave goods found in the nearby Tomba degli Ori originally resided in this tomb. In 1956 a complete cleaning and restoration of the sarcophagus was completed. It is the only limestone sarcophagus of its era discovered to date and the only sarcophagus with a series of narrative scenes of Minoan funerary ritual. The sarcophagus has fresco painting on all four sides. On the short sides there is a scene of goats (earlier identified as horses or griffin) drawing a chariot, led by a female figure.

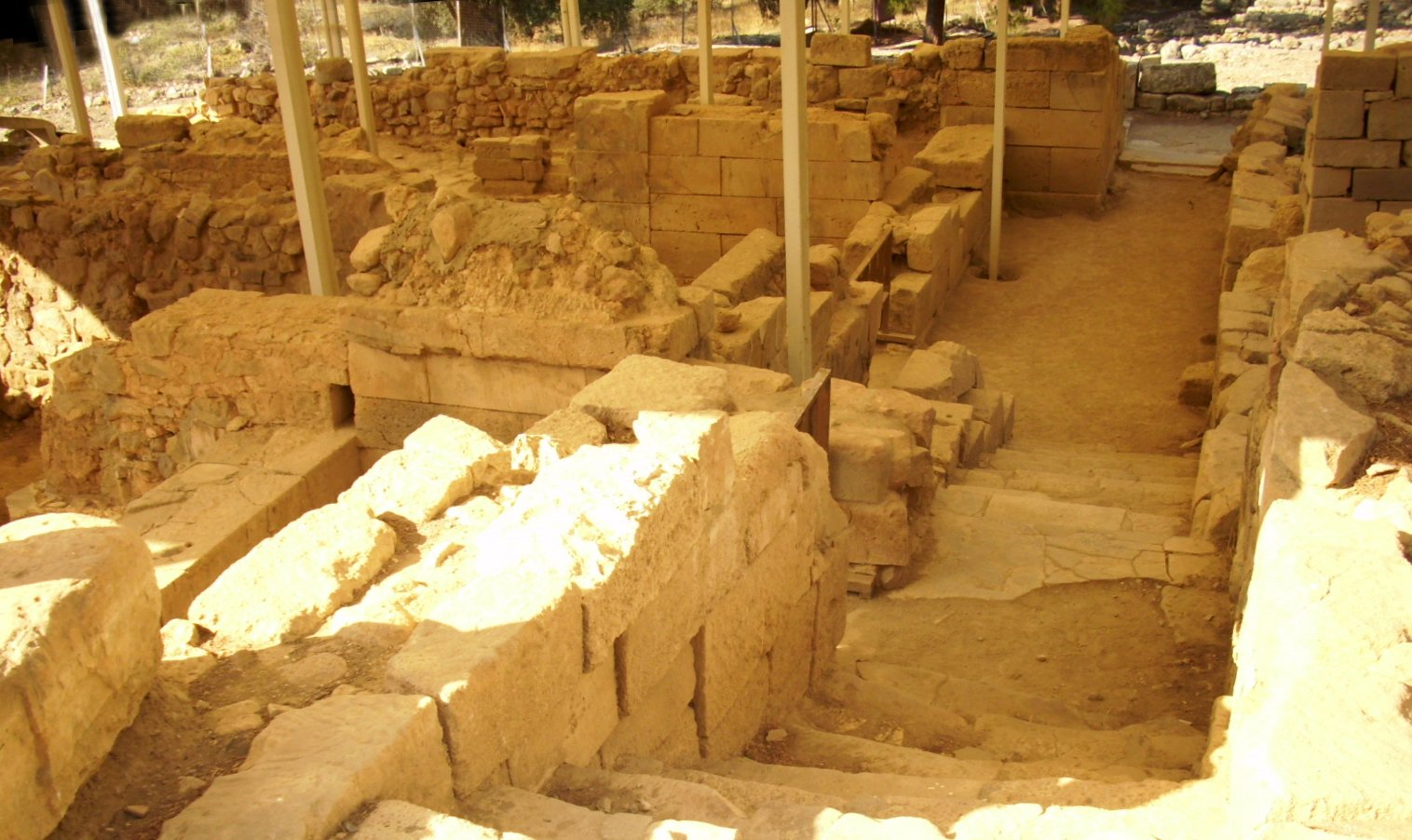
Excavation at Hagia Triada

In the center of one of the long sides of the sarcophagus is the scene of a bull lying on a table which has two goats squatting underneath. A man, playing an aulos flute and wearing a phorbeia faces the table and is followed in procession by four women.

The second long side, generally called the North or Front (because it faced the door of the tomb), is divided into four directional zones. In the rightmost zone there is a structure with three stairs and a spiral border holding a leafless tree. Next to the left an armless figure (speculated to be a god, statue, or deceased man) faces left. In the next leftward zone three men in procession face the armless figure bearing two bulls and a crescent shaped white boat. In the leftmost zone a man dressed in a long robe is playing a seven-stringed lyre (Phorminx) preceded by a woman who is wearing a crown and carrying two baskets. She in turn is preceded by a woman offering a libation to an altar. The altar is decorated with double axes and two yellow and red birds.

=== Harvester Vase ===
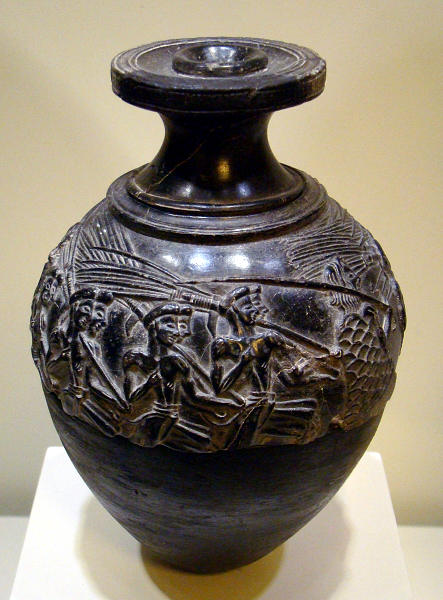
Harvester Vase Heraklion Archaeological Museum

An agrarian procession is depicted on the black steatite "Harvester Vase" which was found in Hagia Triada along with the Chieftain Cup. The lower portion was not preserved. The date of the vase is in some dispute. The range of Middle Minoan III to Late Minoan I had been proposed. An alternative proposal is to the last phase of the NeoPalatial period (Late Minoan II). Men are walking in twos with rods on their shoulders. The leader is dressed in a priestly robe with a fringe and is carrying a stick. A group of musicians accompany with song, and one of them holds a sistrum. Other interpretations of the procession have been proposed.

=== Chieftain's Cup ===
The Chieftain Cup is a serpentine footed conical cup or chalice measuring 11.5 centimetres high and with a diameter of 9.9 centimetres. It depicts five males, three with "hides" and two facing each other. The rightmost facing figure stands in front of a pillar and wears three necklaces, several arm bands and bracelets, and a belted short kilt with dagger. The other is holding a sword in one hand and an object in the other thought to be a ritual "sprinkler" and also wears a short kilt. On the back only the heads of the three ox-hide bearing figures are seen. There have been a variety of possible explanations for the scene on the Chieftain's Cup.

== See also ==
- Kommos
- Minoan pottery
- Minoan chronology
- Minoan art
- Minoan religion
- Minoan eruption
