= Malia, Crete =

Malia Μάλια
- Municipal unit
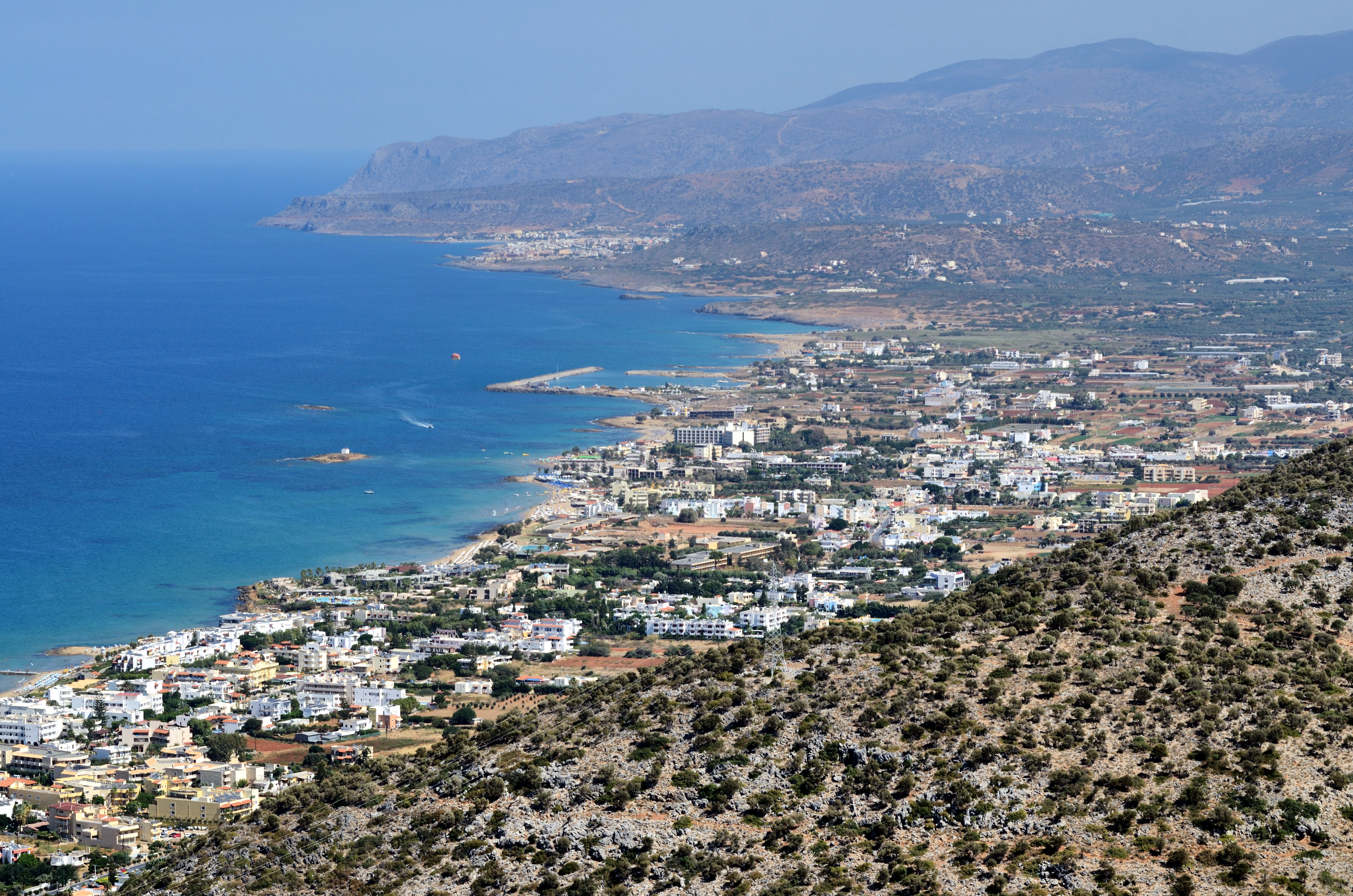
- Malia and bay of Malia

- Location within the regional unit

- Location within Greece
- Coordinates: 35°17′00″N 25°27′53″E
- Country: Greece
- Administrative region: Crete
- Regional unit: Heraklion
- Municipality: Hersonissos

Area
  - Municipal unit: 60.720 km^{2} (23.444 sq mi)
- Elevation: 20 m (66 ft)

Population (2021)
  - Municipal unit: 5,501
  - Municipal unit density: 90.60/km^{2} (234.6/sq mi)
  - Community: 3,522
- Time zone: UTC+2 (EET)
  - Summer (DST): UTC+3 (EEST)

Malia (Greek: Μάλια) is a coastal town and municipal unit situated in the northeast corner of the Heraklion region of Crete, Greece. It is part of the municipality of Hersonissos and is located approximately 34 kilometers (21 miles) east of Heraklion. As of 2021, the population of the municipal unit was 5,501. The area also encompasses the villages of Mochos (Greek: Μοχός), Krasi (Greek: Κράσι), and Stalida (Greek: Σταλίδα), covering a total area of 60.720 square kilometers (23.444 sq mi). Malia is known as a prominent tourist destination, in part owing to its nightlife scene and beaches. Additionally, the town is home to Minoan ruins located three kilometers to the east of the city centre, spanning an area of approximately 1 square kilometer (0.4 sq mi).

== Palace of Malia ==
Close to the modern town lies an archaeological site housing the remains of a Minoan palace and an associated settlement. Dating back to the Middle Bronze Age, the palace suffered destruction from an earthquake during the Late Bronze Age, a fate shared by Knossos and other contemporaneous sites. Subsequently, the palace underwent reconstruction in the latter part of the Late Bronze Age, with the majority of the visible ruins dating from this period. The palace notably includes a central courtyard measuring 48m x 23m. Positioned on the southern side are two sets of ascending steps, alongside a network of small chambers. The premises also features a carved stone known as a kernos stone, resembling a millstone with an attached cup. On the northern side of the courtyard, storage rooms containing large earthenware pithos jars, some reaching heights of up to two meters. These vessels were utilized for storing various commodities such as grain and olive oil, with the rooms featuring a sophisticated drainage system designed to manage spilled liquids.

The palace of Malia was initially uncovered in 1915 by Greek archaeologist Joseph Hadzidakis. Subsequent excavation work commenced in 1922 under the auspices of the French School at Athens in collaboration with Greek scholars. Jean Charbonneaux oversaw the excavation of the Central Court starting in 1921. Following World War I, Fernand Chapouthier and Pierre Demargne resumed excavations, unearthing the palace and its residential neighborhood. In the 1950s, further excavation efforts were led by Micheline and Henri van Effenterre, Andre Dessene, Olivier Pelon, and Jean-Claude Poursat, who explored different sections of the site. Pascal and Claude Darcque Bourrain conducted additional investigations in 1981, focusing on the northwest corner of the palace. Soundings conducted by Olivier Pelon in 1981 and 1982 provided new insights into the palace's precursors. Since 1988, Alexandre Farnoux and Jan Driessen have continued excavation work at the site.

The Palace of Malia covers a floor area of 7,500 square meters and is aligned along a north-south axis, consistent with other Minoan palaces. In terms of architectural design and amenities, it is comparatively smaller and less elaborate than palaces like Knossos and Phaestos.

The Palace of Malia exhibits distinctive features that set it apart from other Minoan palaces. These include the presence of eight kouloures or silos located in the southwest corner, an oblique building situated in the north court, and an altar positioned in the Central Court.

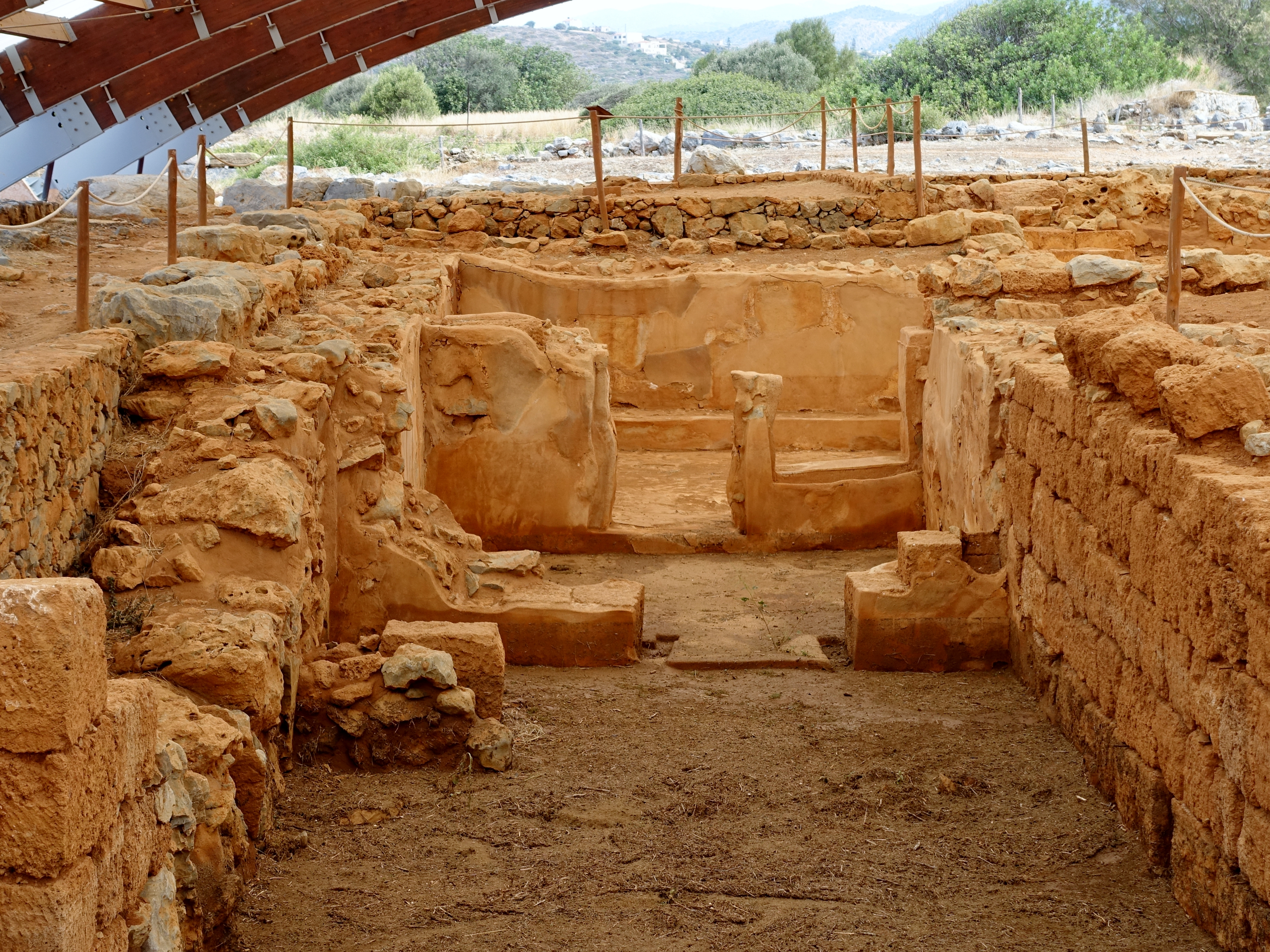
Excavation site of the pillar crypt in the Palace of Malia

== Tourism ==
Malia has undergone transformation into prominent holiday destination, especially for European tourists, since the 1990s. The town's economy is increasingly tourism-centered, focusing on hotels, restaurants, gift shops, bars, and nightclubs. Malia has emerged as a top tourist hub in Crete and Europe, drawing comparisons to destinations like Ibiza and Magaluf. The tourist-focused economy is largely dormant in the winter months, with many restaurants and nightlife spots closed until the influx of foreign tourists begins in spring.

Malia's 6 kilometer-long coastline features sandy beach stretching from the base of the strip and extending eastward toward the vicinity of the Minoan palace. The seaside Dimokratias Street (Malia Beach Road) is the main thoroughfare in the newer part of the town, along which many bars, restaurants, and nightlife venues are located.

Malia gained prominence as the setting for the 2011 British comedy film, The Inbetweeners Movie, depicting a lads' holiday adventure of the main characters. Independent reviews of booking data from various travel agents indicated Malia as the favored destination among young adults in 2013. Over the years, Malia has witnessed growing popularity, with the number of visitors surpassing other Eastern Mediterranean holiday destinations like Ayia Napa and Zante. The town is particularly popular with British holidaymakers aged 18–30 for party and leisure-themed vacations. An accompanying rise in rowdy behaviour led to 95% of Malia's hotels outlawing this type of package tourism in 2017, which accounted for a 30% drop in tourism to the town in the following years. The 2023 movie How to Have Sex was filmed in Malia.

== Villages in Municipal Unit of Malia ==
=== Krasi village ===
Krasi village is situated approximately 46.3 kilometers southeast of Heraklion, the capital of Crete, and 6 kilometers south of Malia town, nestled inland within Hersonissos Municipality, at an elevation of 600 m. It is situated at the northwest slope of Mount Selena (1,559 meters elevation). Krasi's local economy is focused on agriculture, particularly olive cultivation and livestock farming. The southern side village features the "Megalh Vrish- Ydragogio" fountain, which serves as a source for local agricultural irrigation. The village has a church, Metamorphosis Sotiros, which features frescoes and a wooden temple. Also located within the village is the Protominoikos Tomb, an archeological finding predating the Minoan era that was unearthed in 1929 by Spyridon Marinatos. Krasi is also associated by locals with a tradition of music and dance.

=== Mochos ===
The village of Mochos (alternatively transliterated as Mohos) is situated in the mountainous interior, about 45 kilometers southeast of Heraklion, within the Hersonissos Municipality, and at an elevation of 400 meters. It is renowned for its preservation of 16th-century architecture, which is present in the central village square. Each year on the night between 14 and 15 August, a celebration of the Virgin Mary is held in the village, which includes traditional Cretan food, music and dance. The village is home to the Folklore Museum of Mochos, which depicts traditional Cretan life, including the reconstruction of a standard Cretan house and a collection of tools and objects associated with traditional work occupations on the island.

=== Stalida ===
The seaside village of Stalida (also known as Stalis) is situated 31 kilometers east of Heraklion, 3 kilometers east of Hersonissos and 3 kilometers west of Malia. Stalida's economy is centred around tourism, offers amenities including shops, restaurants, and accommodation options. The village is perceived as a more tourist friendly location to families, in contrast to Malia's reputation centered around young, single partygoers.
