= Lustral basin =

Structure in Minoan architecture

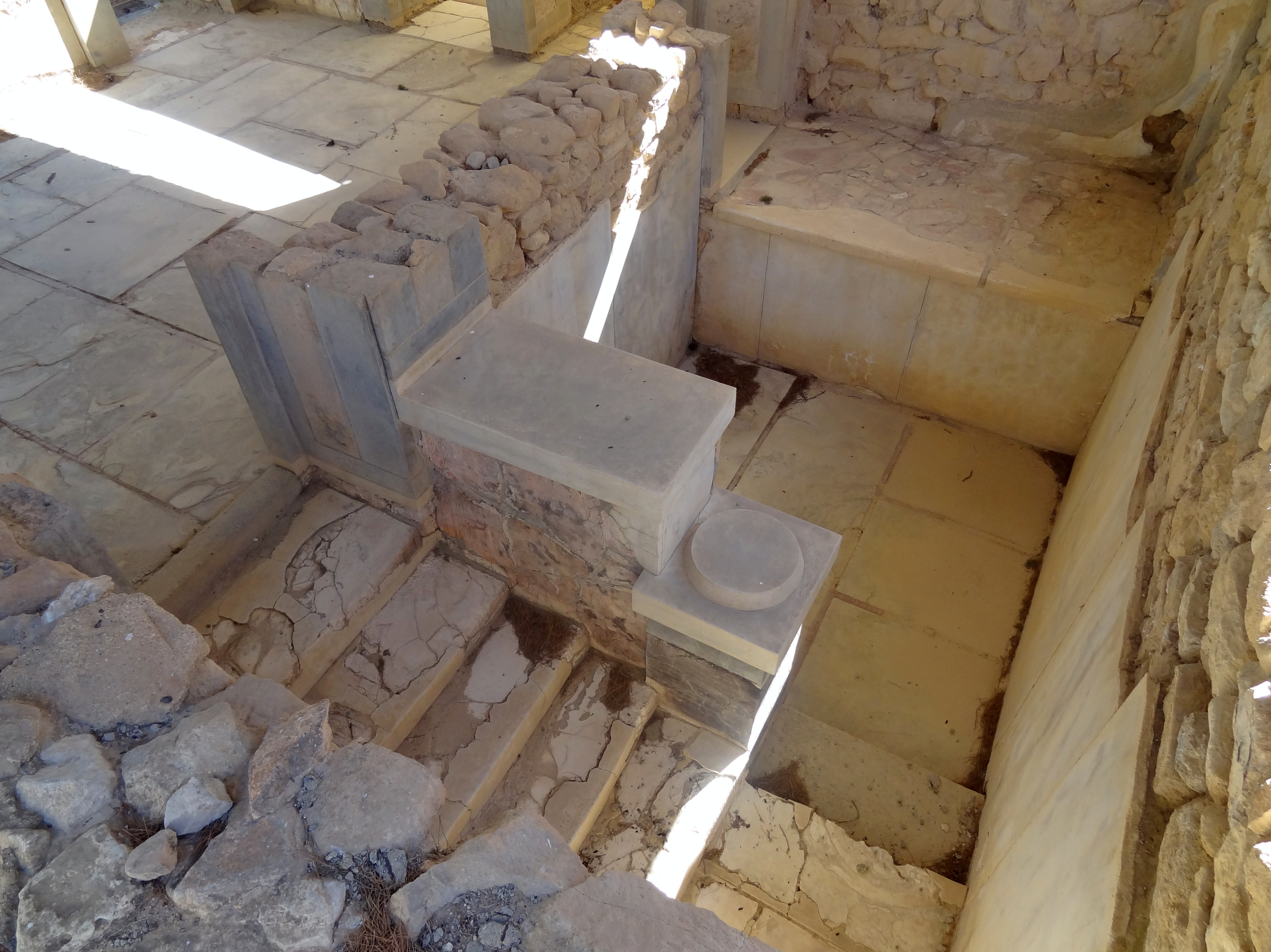
A lustral basin in the West Wing of the Palace of Phaistos.

The lustral basin is an architectural form used in Minoan architecture. Consisting of a small sunken room reached by a staircase, they are characteristic of elite architecture of the Neopalatial period (c. 1750-1470 BC).

They are hypothesized to have been used either as shrines, baths, or as part of an initiation ritual. The term was coined by Sir Arthur Evans, who hypothesized that they were used for lustration.

== Description ==
Lustral basins are small square chambers sunk into the floor of the surrounding room. They are entered via a descending L-shaped staircase and are open at the top, allowing their occupants to be viewed from above.

Lustral basins are found at sites throughout Crete as well as at Akrotiri in the Cyclades. However, no examples have been found on the mainland.

Lustral basins were common in elite buildings such as Minoan palaces and villas. Each palace had at least one lustral basin, with Phaistos having four of them. At Knossos, one is adjacent to the throne room, while another is located near the north entrance. Although they are commonly associated with palaces, lustral basins were common in other elite buildings. Known examples include the Villa of the Lilies at Amnisos, two houses at Tylissos, and several of the houses surrounding the palace of Knossos.

Lustral basins at various sites
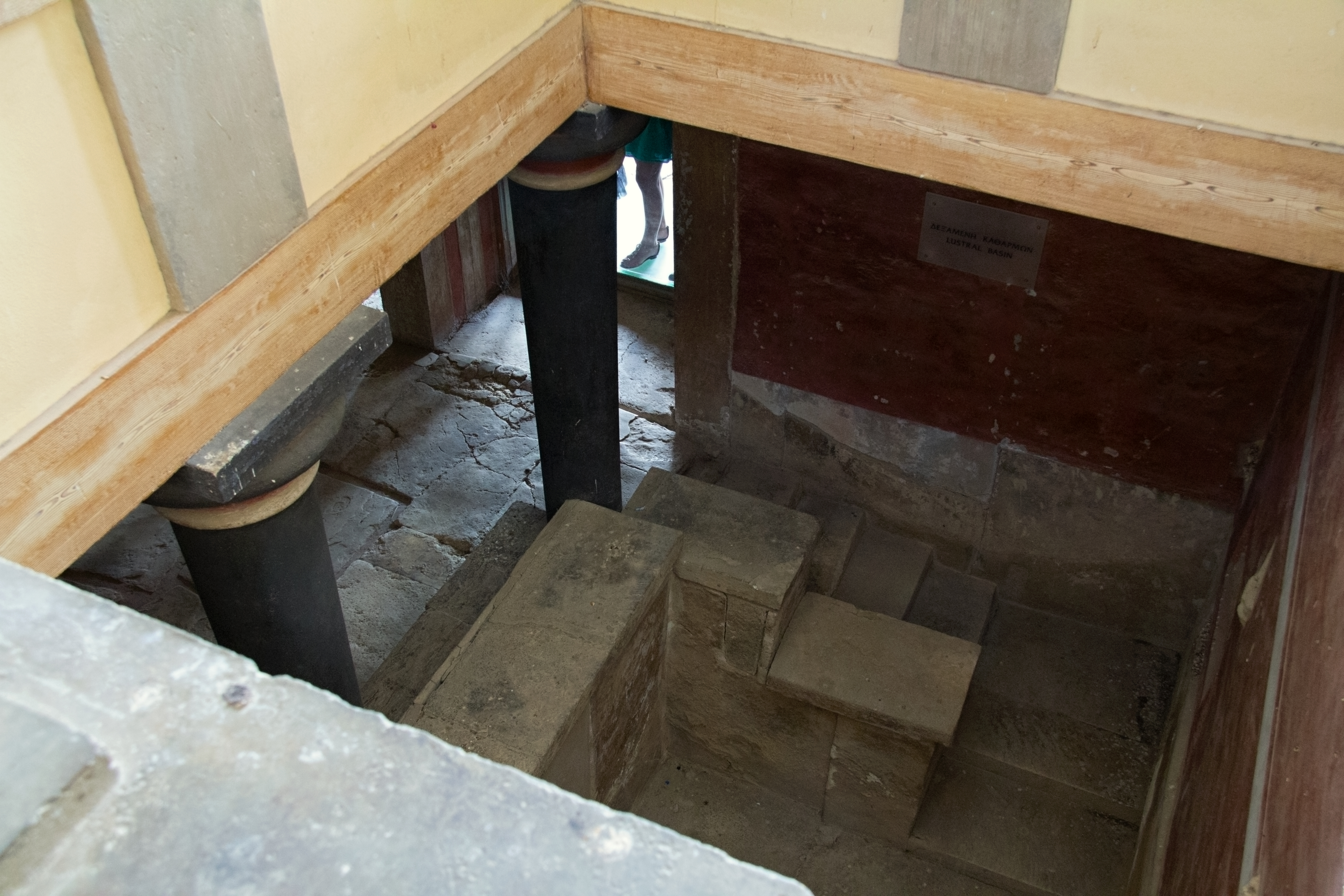
Lustral basin at the Throne Room, Knossos

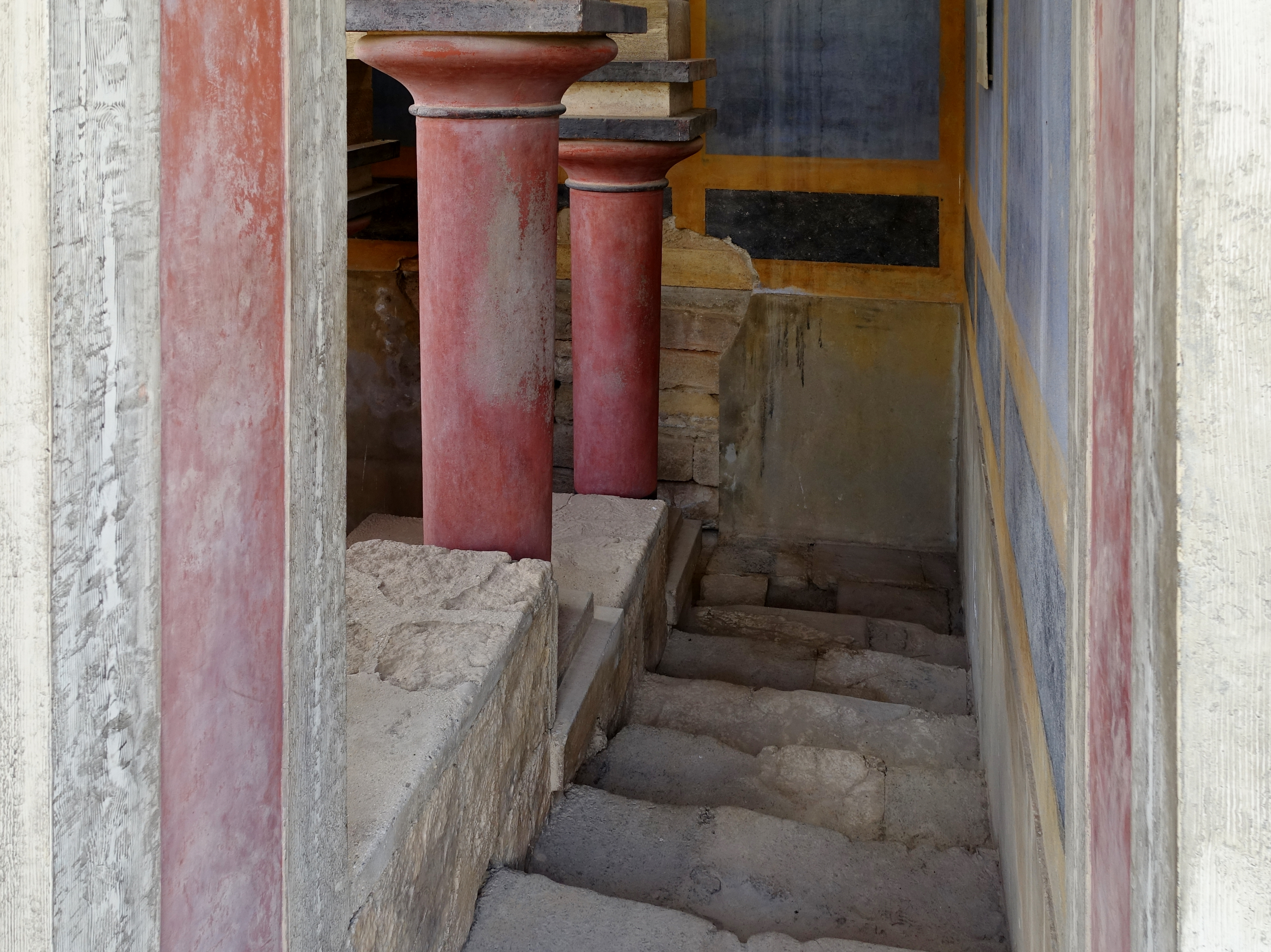
North Lustral Basin, Knossos

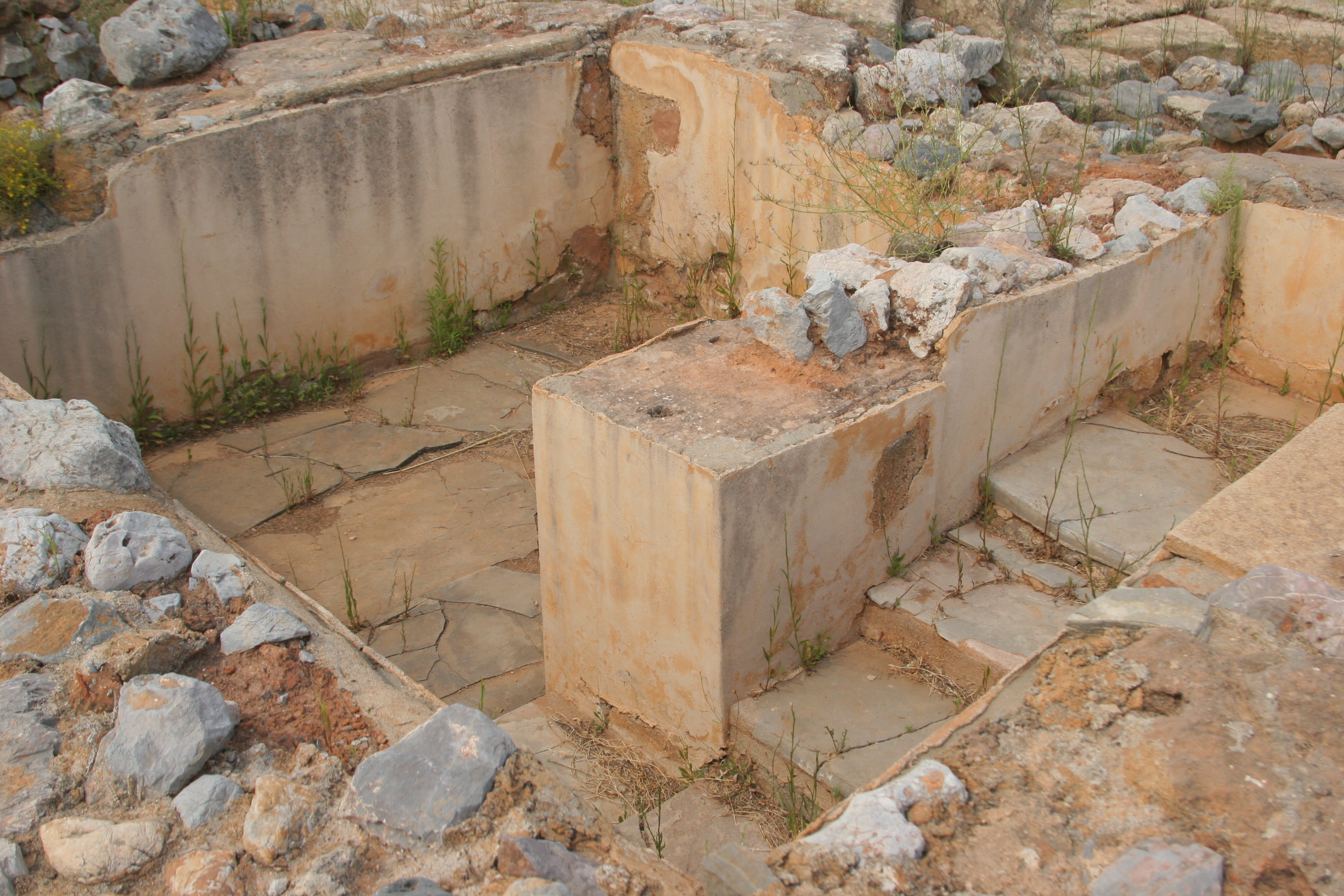
Palace at Malia

== History ==
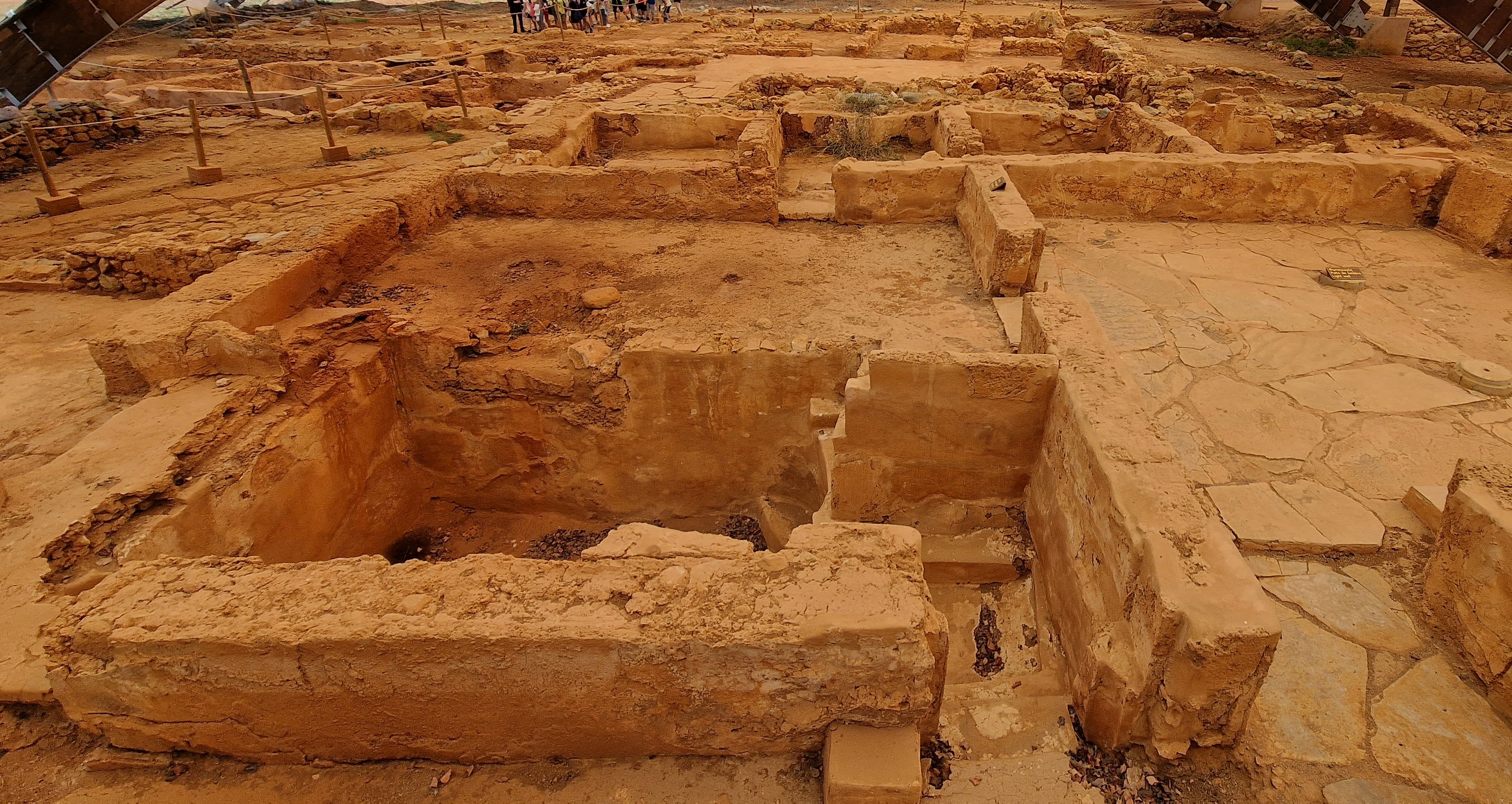
The earliest example of a lustral basin, from Quartier Mu at Malia

Lustral basins are first documented for the final phase of the Protopalatial period but they are especially characteristic of the Neopalatial period. One earlier example from the Protopalatial period is known from Building A in Quartier Mu at Malia. This building contains early antecedents of other architectural forms that would become standard in elite architecture of the Neopalatial period.

Lustral basins were added to the palaces during the renovations that marked the beginning of the Neopalatial period (MM III, c. 1750–1700 BC).

Lustral basins fell out of use and were filled in during the LM IB period (c. 1625–1470 BC), simultaneous with an island-wide change in religious practice that also saw the abandonment of peak sanctuaries. In some instances, it is not clear whether an old lustral basin was filled in or whether the level-floor lustral basin had become an architectural feature in its own right. Examples include a putative filled-in in the villa at Nirou Khani as well as one adjacent to the Queen's Megaron at Knossos.

Filled-in lustral basins
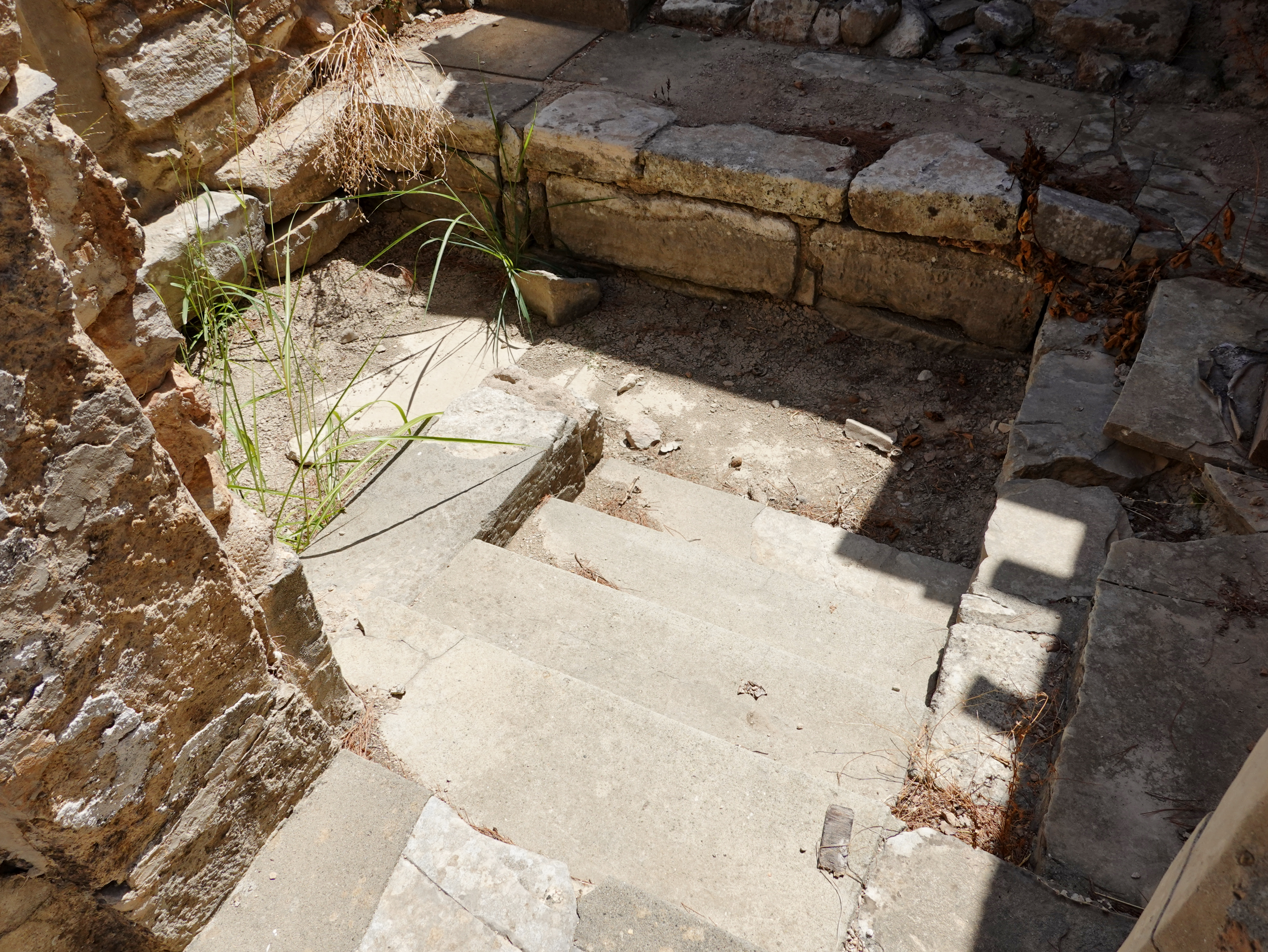
House C, Tylissos

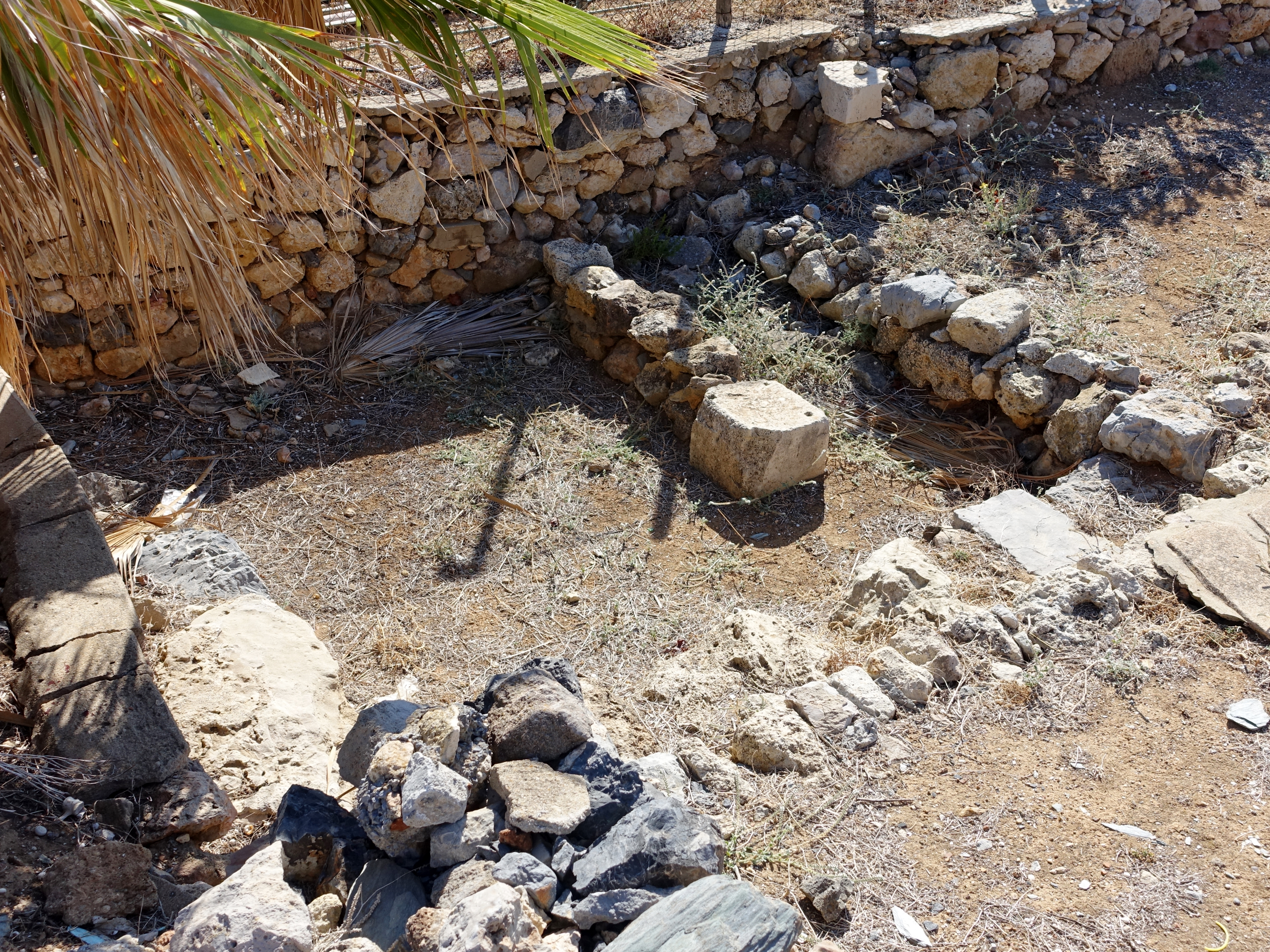
Villa of the Lilies, Amnisos

== Function ==
What lustral basins were used for is unknown. They are presumed to have been used for rituals, in particular given that at least some were decorated with religious-themed frescoes. However, their exact function is unknown. The term "lustral basin" was coined by Arthur Evans, who found unguent flasks in a lustral basin at Knossos and inferred that it had been used for anointing rituals. Subsequent researchers have interpreted them as forerunners of the classical-era adyton or as the locus of an initiation ritual. An alternate hypothesis regards them as baths, though they lack drains and show no signs of water weathering.

When Evans excavated the Throne Room Lustral Basin at Knossos, he initially mistook it for an impluvium and then for a culinary fishtank. Given local aquaculture, he speculated that during its time of use, the lustral basin was full of eels.

== See also ==
- Kouloura

== Bibliography ==
- Günkel-Maschek, Ute (2020). Minoische Bild-Räume: Neue Untersuchungen zu den Wandbildern des spätbronzezeitlichen Palastes von Knossos [Minoan image-spaces: New investigations into the wall paintings of the Late Bronze Age palace of Knossos]. Heidelberg: Heidelberg University Publishing. (on Lustral basins especially the summary on pp. 419–424).
