= Minoan palaces =

Ancient Minoan buildings in Crete

Minoan Palatial Centres
UNESCO World Heritage Site
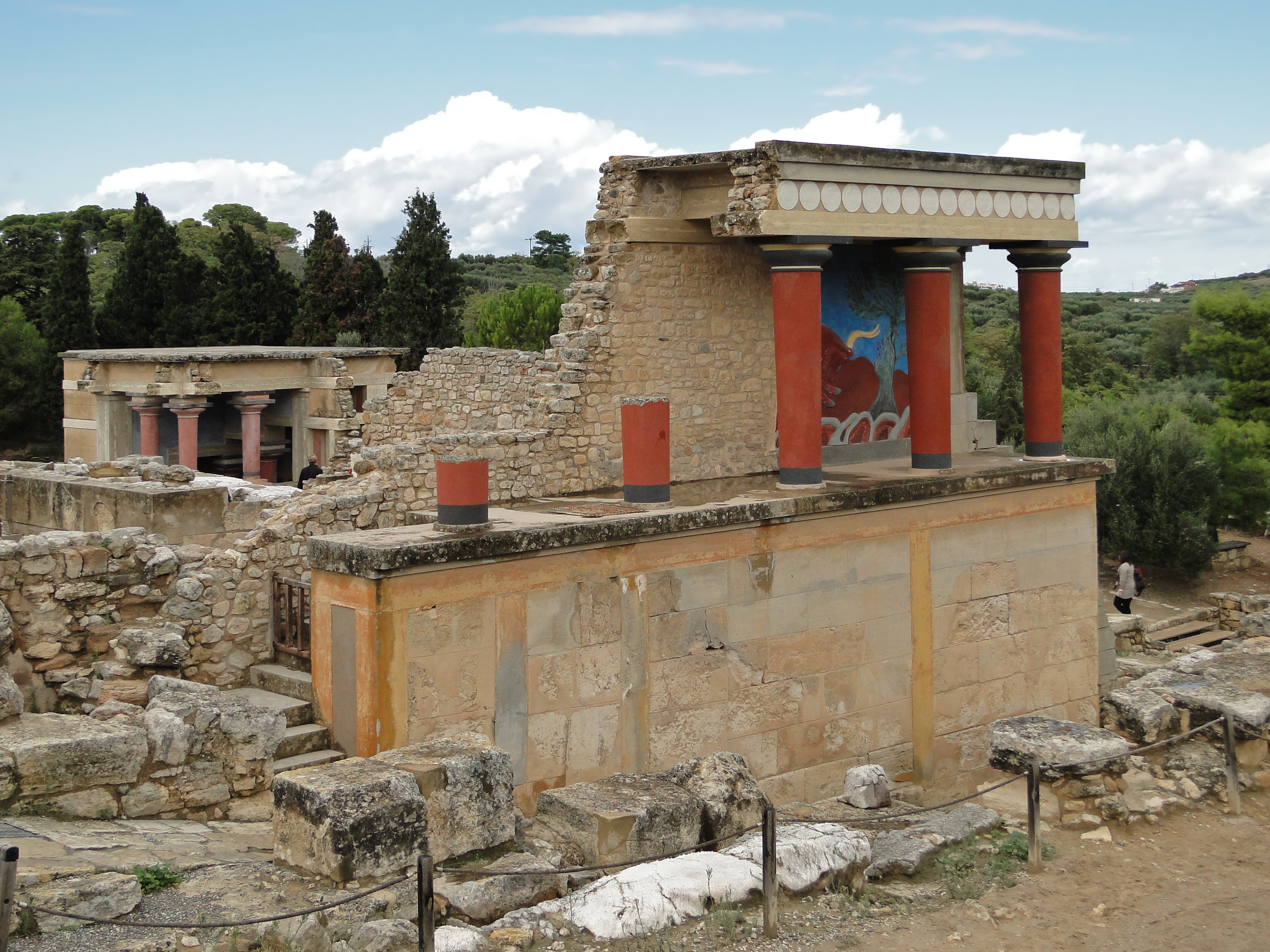
- Part of the palace at Knossos, as reconstructed by Sir Arthur Evans

- Location within Greece
- Location: Crete, Greece
- Criteria: ii, iii, iv, vi
- Reference: 1733
- Inscription: 2025 (47th Session)
- Coordinates: 35.248°N 24.887°E

Minoan palaces were massive building complexes built on Crete during the Bronze Age. They are often considered emblematic of the Minoan civilization and are modern tourist destinations. Archaeologists generally recognize five structures as palaces, namely those at Knossos, Phaistos, Malia, Galatas, and Zakros. Minoan palaces consisted of multistory wings surrounding an open rectangular central court. They shared a common architectural vocabulary and organization, including distinctive room types such as the lustral basin and the pillar crypt. However, each palace was unique, and their appearances changed dramatically as they were continually remodeled throughout their lifespans.

The palaces' function is a topic of continuing debate in Minoan archaeology. Despite the modern term "palace", it is generally agreed that they did not primarily serve as royal residences. They are known to have contained shrines, open areas for communal festivals, industrial workshops, as well as storage magazines for large agricultural surpluses. Archives of Linear A and Linear B tablets suggest that they served in part as local administrative centers.

The first palaces were constructed around 1900 BC, as the culmination of longer-term social and architectural trends. These initial palaces were destroyed by earthquakes around 1700 BC but were rebuilt on a grander scale, with new palaces appearing at other sites. Around 1450 BC, a wave of violent destructions destroyed all of the palaces except for Knossos, which was itself destroyed roughly a century later.

== Definition and terminology ==
The term "palace" was introduced by Arthur Evans, who had interpreted Knossos as the residence of a "Priest-King". The term has generally been retained despite subsequent researchers largely rejecting Evans's interpretation. However, alternative terms have been proposed including “court building” and “court-centered building”, which characterize the buildings in terms of their form while remaining neutral as to their function. Numerous other terms from Minoan archaeology carry similar caveats. For instance, the term "Lustral Basin" is often used to refer to a particular architectural feature even by scholars who do not regard them as having been used for lustration.

== Architecture ==
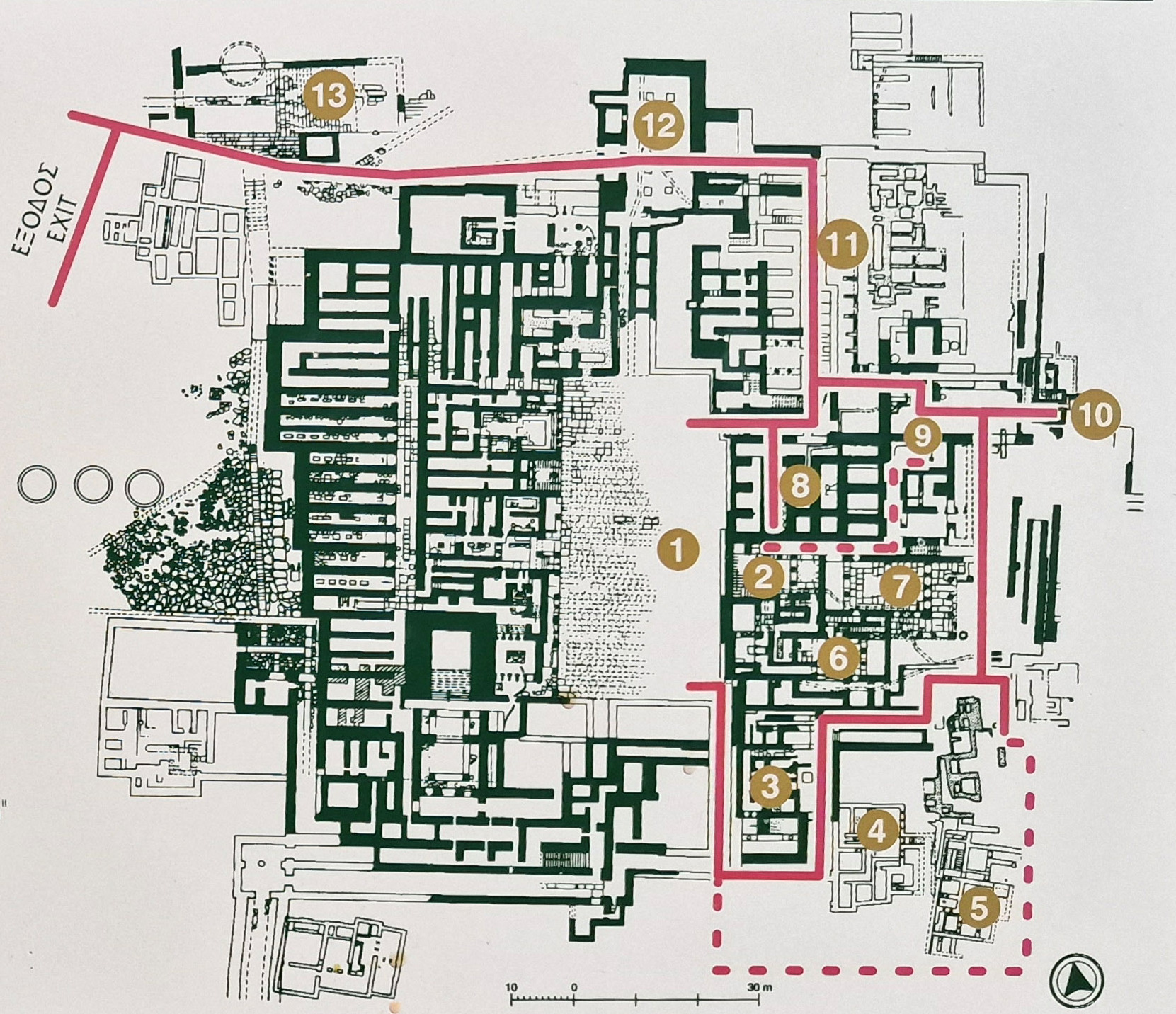
Like the other palaces, the Palace at Knossos was organized around an open central court, labeled (1) in this map.

The defining feature of a Minoan palace is its arrangement of multistory wings around a rectangular central court. Beyond that, the palaces shared a further common architectural vocabulary of room types, ornamentation styles, and shared tendencies in layout. Their floorplans have been described as "labyrinthine", with corridors often taking circuitous routes even between rooms which shared a wall. They share similar tendencies in organization, for instance having their main storage magazines and industrial areas in the north and northwest wings. Palaces were typically at the center of a larger settlement and are not always clearly demarcated from the rest of the town.

Despite their common architectural vocabulary, each palace was distinct. For instance, while the palaces share a common overall organization, their specific floorplans are unique. Similarly, while they share the same proportions, they varied considerably in size. In the Neopalatial era, Knossos was twice as large as Malia and Phaistos, and three times as large as Galatas and Zakros. The palaces also changed dramatically over their lifespans, with many of their most familiar features only appearing in the Neopalatial era.

=== Central courts ===
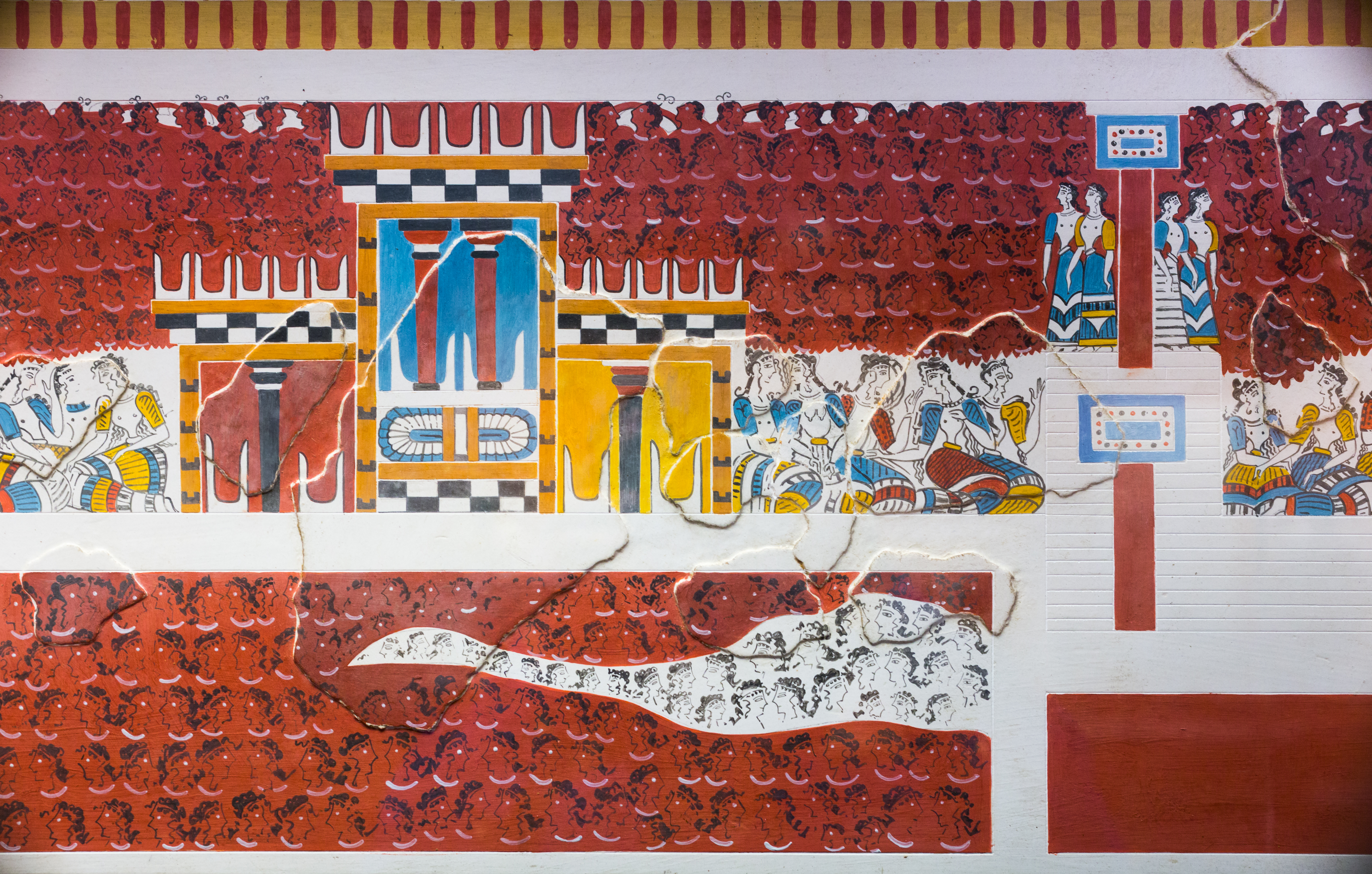
The Grandstand Fresco appears to show a ceremony taking place in the Central Court at Knossos.

Minoan palaces were organized around a rectangular central court. In each palace, the court had 2:1 proportions, with the longer side running north-south. This orientation would have maximized sunlight, and oriented important rooms in the west wing's inner facade towards the rising sun. The central courts were typically aligned with the surrounding topography, in particular with nearby sacred mountains. For instance, the palace at Phaistos is aligned with Mount Ida and Knossos is aligned with Mount Juktas. The central courts at Knossos, Phaistos, and Malia were nearly identical in area, measuring roughly 24 by 52 meters. Zakros had a smaller central court, roughly 12 by 29 meters.

The central courts were used for rituals and festivals. One of these festivals is believed to be depicted in the Grandstand Fresco found at Knossos. Altars found in the courts of some palaces suggest other kinds of ritual activity. Some scholars have suggested that bull-leaping would have taken place in the courts, though others have argued that the paving would not have been optimal for the animals or the people, and that the restricted access points would have kept the spectacle too far out of public view.

=== West courts ===
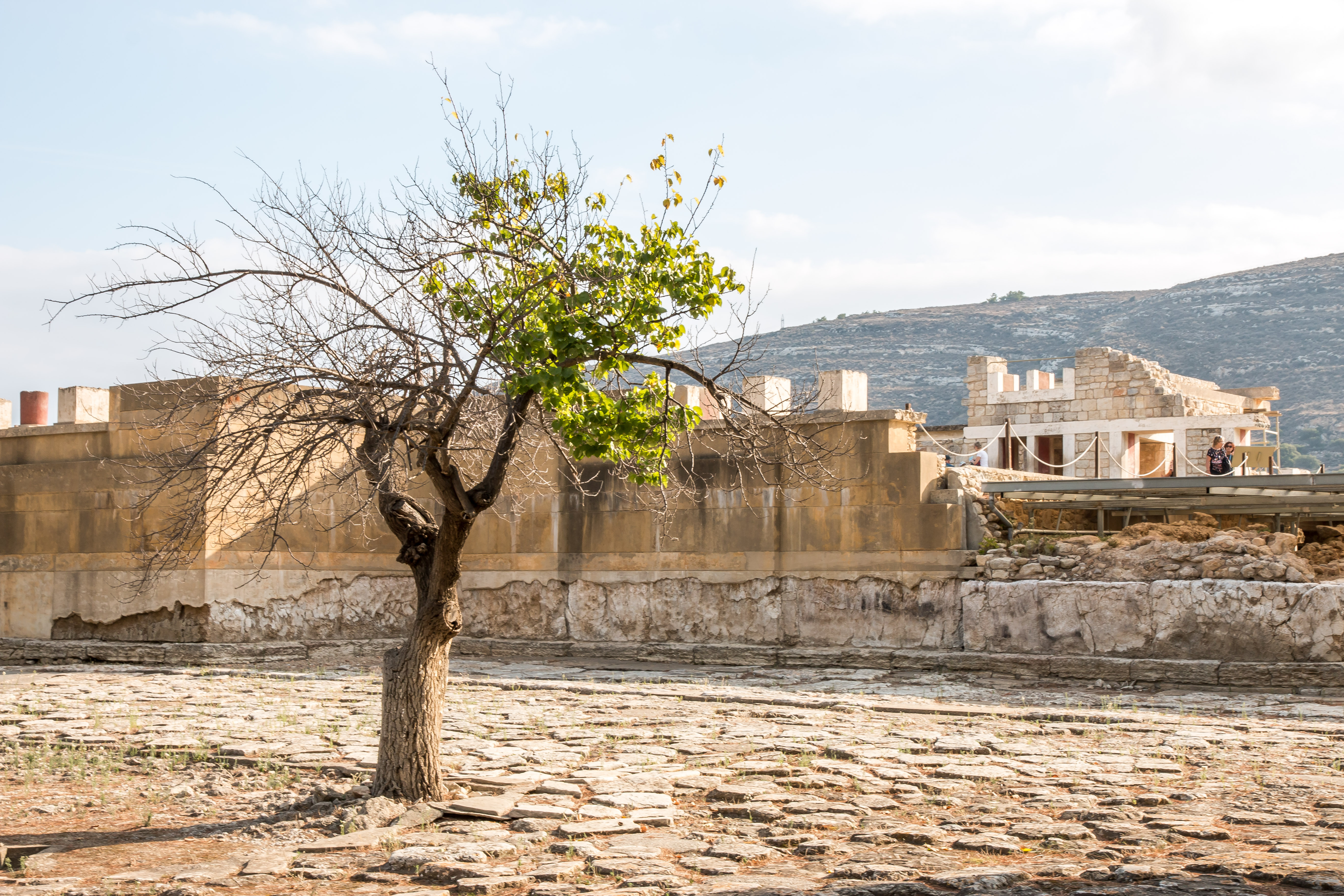
The west court at the Palace at Knossos, with the west facade behind it.

The west court was a spacious public area directly outside a palace's main entrance. Unlike the central court, the west court was located outside the palace's enclosed area, and was thus easily accessible from the lower town. In the Protopalatial era, the courts were lined with raised triangular causeways and circular stone-lined pits which excavators dubbed kouloures after a circular Cretan pastry. Kouloures have been variously interpreted as granaries, cisterns, and planters for sacred trees. They were removed when the west courts were expanded in the Neopalatial period.

The west courts were adjacent to the palaces' monumental west facades, which towered over them. Like their Near Eastern antecedents, the west facades were punctuated by recesses which would have enhanced the spectacle of public events, creating what is sometimes referred to as a "window of appearances". The west courts are believed to have been used for public festivals, in contrast to the central courts where events would have included a smaller audience of elites. The Sacred Grove Fresco appears to depict such a ritual at Knossos, the west court identifiable by the causeways.

=== The Minoan hall ===
The Minoan Hall has been referred to as "the very essence of Minoan architecture". Typically found on the palaces' north sides, they consisted of a main room, a forehall, and a lightwell. The latter was separated from the main room by a series of wooden doors mounted on piers, called a pier-and-door partition. By opening or closing the doors, occupants could control light and airflow, transforming the hall into either an interior or exterior space.

Few artifacts have been found in the halls themselves, leaving little evidence of the activity that went on there. However, several examples are located near tablet archives, raising the possibility that they were used as meeting places for bureaucrats.

=== Lustral basins ===
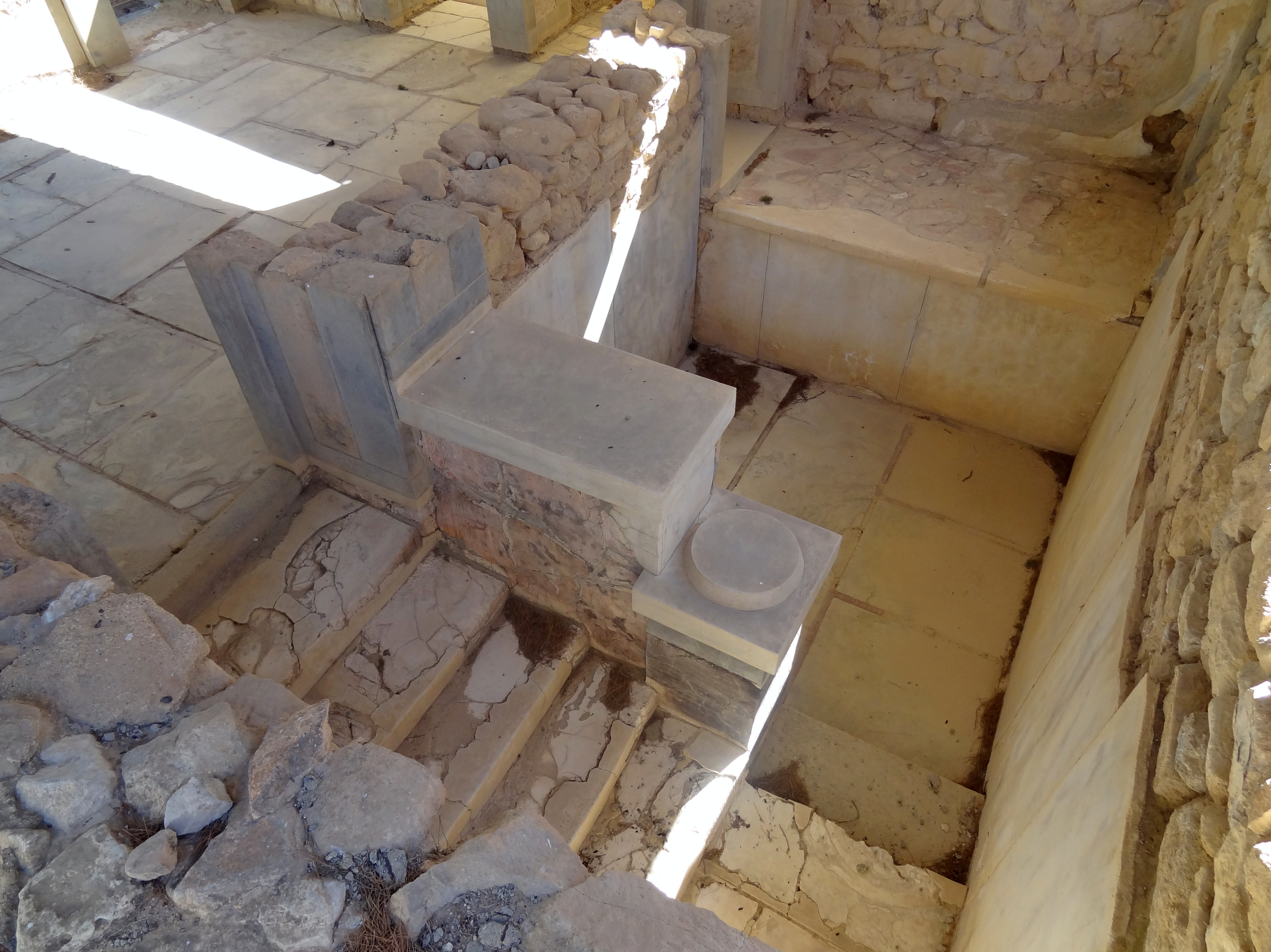
A lustral basin at the Palace of Phaistos.

Lustral basins are small rectangular chambers sunk into the floor of the surrounding room. They are reached via a descending L-shaped staircase and are open at the top, allowing occupants to be viewed from above. Each palace had at least one lustral basin, with Phaistos having four of them.

They are presumed to have been used for rituals, in particular given that at least some were decorated with religious-themed frescoes. However, their exact function is unknown. The term "lustral basin" was coined by Arthur Evans, who found unguent flasks in a lustral basin at Knossos and inferred that it had been used for anointing rituals. Subsequent researchers have interpreted them as forerunners of the classical-era adyton or as the location of an initiation ritual. An alternate hypothesis regards them as baths, though they lack drains and show no signs of water weathering.

Lustral basins were added to the palaces during the renovations that marked the beginning of the Neopalatial period (MM III, c. 1750–1700 BC). Earlier examples exist from the Protopalatial period, but only became commonplace and only took on their canonical form during the Neopalatial period. They fell out of use and were filled in during the LM IB period (c. 1625–1470 BC), simultaneous with an island-wide change in religious practice that also saw the abandonment of peak sanctuaries.

=== Pillar crypts ===
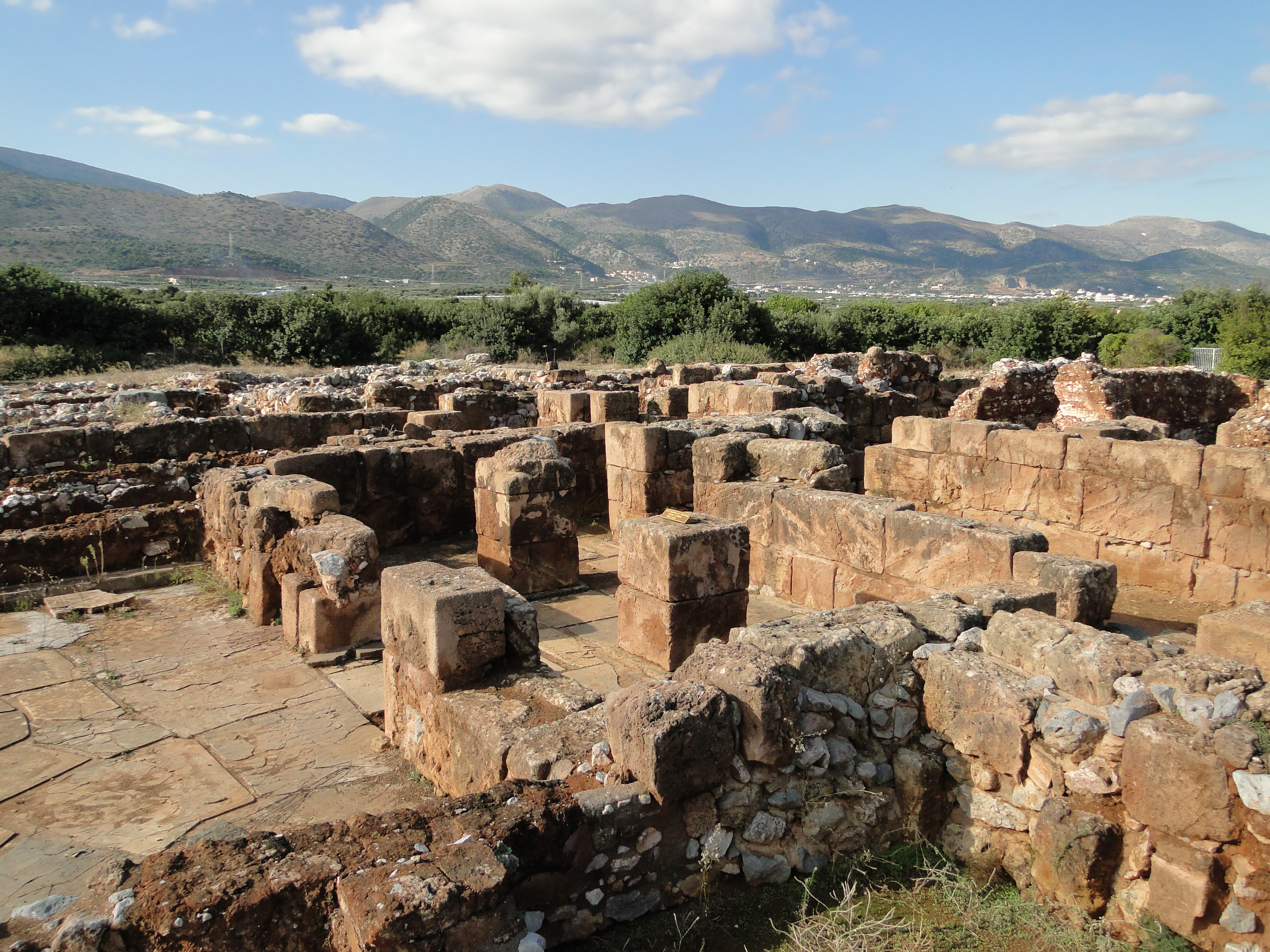
A pillar crypt in the Palace of Malia.

Pillar crypts were small dark rooms with one or more square pillars in the center. These pillars were often with the double axe sign, and sometimes accompanied channels or basins which may have been used for libations. They were usually located in lower levels near storage magazines, often directly below a cult room. They are sometimes interpreted as human-made analogues of sacred caves, where worship often centered around stalagmites and stalactites incised with the double axe. Like lustral basins, pillar crypts also show up in villas. However, they also show up in tombs, suggesting that their ritual use may have had some relation to the dead. As with lustral basins, these rooms fell into disuse during the LM IB period (c. 1625–1470 BC).

== Function ==
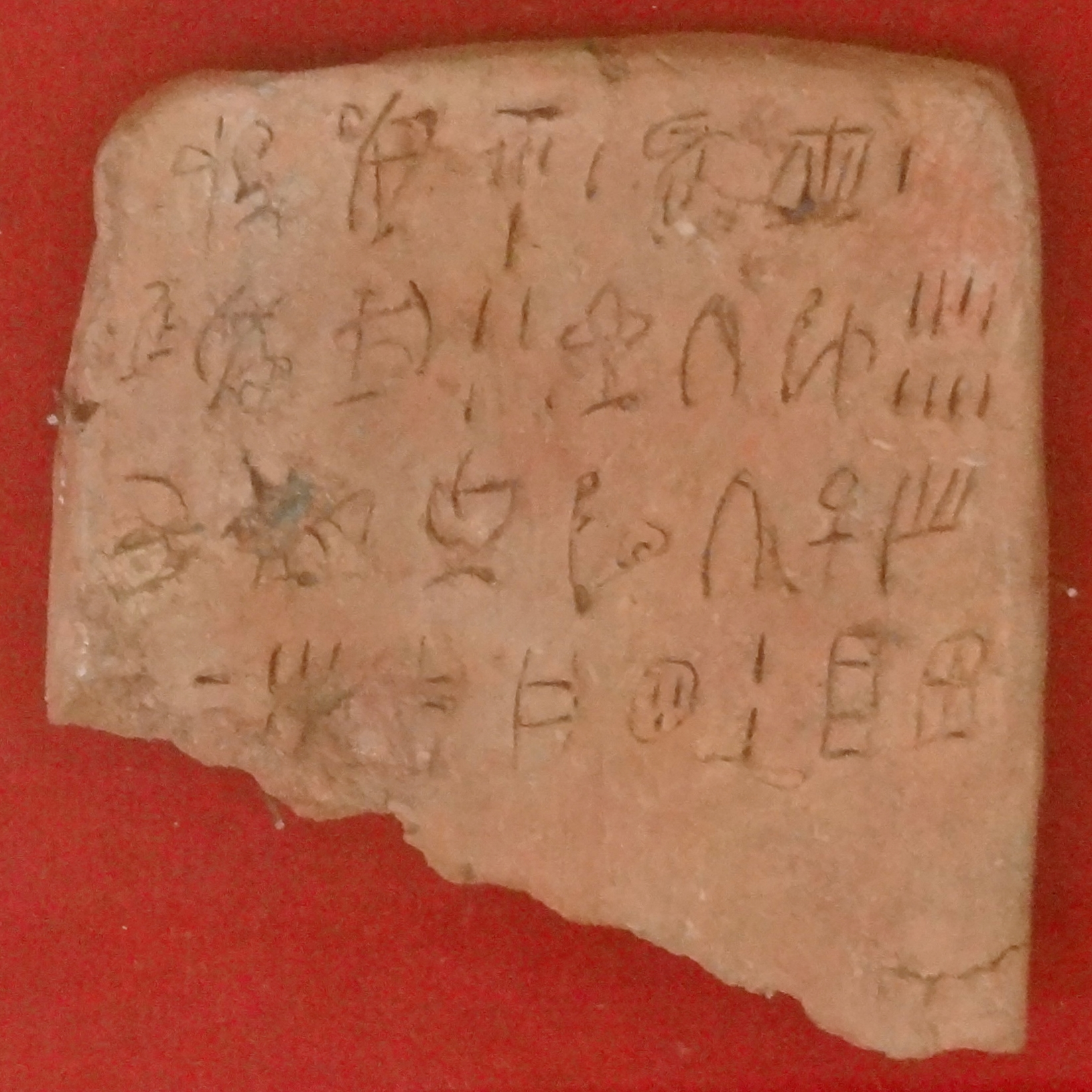
A Linear A tablet from the west wing of the Palace at Zakros.

The palaces are traditionally regarded as the seats of a combined political, economic, and religious authority that presided over a redistributive economy. Thus, their development is often taken as a sign of social stratification and formation of state-level societies on Crete. While this view is still widespread among scholars, it has also been questioned. In particular, the functions of the palaces seem to have varied by time and by site, and many seemingly palatial functions also took place in other kinds of buildings. Thus, the role of the palaces in Minoan society remains a topic of scholarly debate.

Writing and sealing is often taken as evidence for viewing the palaces as regional administration centers. For instance, documents from Knossos suggest that it managed large flocks of sheep in the Protopalatial era, and also appear to record transactions involving figs, olives, cereals, and other produce. (Note: During the Protopalatial Period, records were made using Linear A and Cretan hieroglyphs, both of which remain mostly undeciphered. However, the numeral system and some logograms have been deciphered, allowing researchers to recover the information conveyed in some cases.) Later Linear B documents record agricultural surplusses far beyond local needs for subsistence, including 960,000 liters of grain from a place called Da-wo. However, both writing and sealing predate the construction of the palaces and were never exclusive to them. For instance, there is less evidence of administrative bureaucracy at the Palace of Phaistos than at non-palatial buildings in nearby Ayia Triada. Similarly, even in eras where there is clear evidence of palace-based redistribution, there was still economic activity outside the palaces' control.

Unlike the Near Eastern buildings that influenced them, Minoan palaces were not secure fortresses, and were at least partially accessible to residents of the adjacent towns. Similarly, while Near Eastern societies had separate buildings which served as palaces and temples, Minoan architecture does not make any such obvious distinction. Some scholars have questioned whether these functions were truly grouped under one roof, or if we have somehow fundamentally misunderstood the palaces.

Similarly, they do not appear to have been the seats of kings or centralized authority. Emerging evidence suggests that palaces were primarily consumers rather than producers of many goods associated with them, such as Kamares Ware pottery, though there is limited evidence for on-site production at the palaces. A major exception is loom weights found at Knossos and Phaistos.

The palaces' courts are generally regarded as having been used for public rituals, though the nature of these rituals is unknown. One hypothesis suggests that the west courts were used for a harvest festival. This view is based largely on the interpretation of kouloures as grain repositories. However, this interpretation has been questioned on the basis that the kouloures lacked the sort of capping or lining that would have been necessary to keep the grain dry.

The palaces have extensive storage facilities which were used for agricultural commodities as well as tableware. Enormous sets of high quality tableware were stored in the palaces, often produced elsewhere. For instance, Kamares Ware found at Knossos was probably made in Mesara.

== Historical development ==
The first palaces are generally dated to the MM IB period, c. 1925–1875 BC. (Note: Minoan history is divided into Early Minoan, Middle Minoan, and Late Minoan periods, with further subdivisions indicated as needed. This relative chronology based on pottery styles is necessary because the absolute calendar dates are often uncertain. See Minoan chronology for more details.) Their appearance was a sudden culmination of longer social and architectural trends, and marks the beginning of the Protopalatial era. The Protopalatial palaces were destroyed around at the end of MM IIB (c. 1700 BC), seemingly by earthquakes. New palaces were constructed during MM III (c. 1750–1700 BC), marking the beginning of the Neopalatial era, which is often regarded as the mature phase of the Minoan civilization. The Neopalatial palaces were destroyed as part of a wave of violent destructions which shook the island at the end of LM IB, c. 1470 BC. After that, only Knossos continued in use during the Monopalatial era, during which a Mycenaean elite ruled the island, forming a hybrid "Mycenoan" culture. The Palace at Knossos was destroyed at an unknown point roughly a century later, marking the end of the Minoan palaces.

=== Early antecedents ===
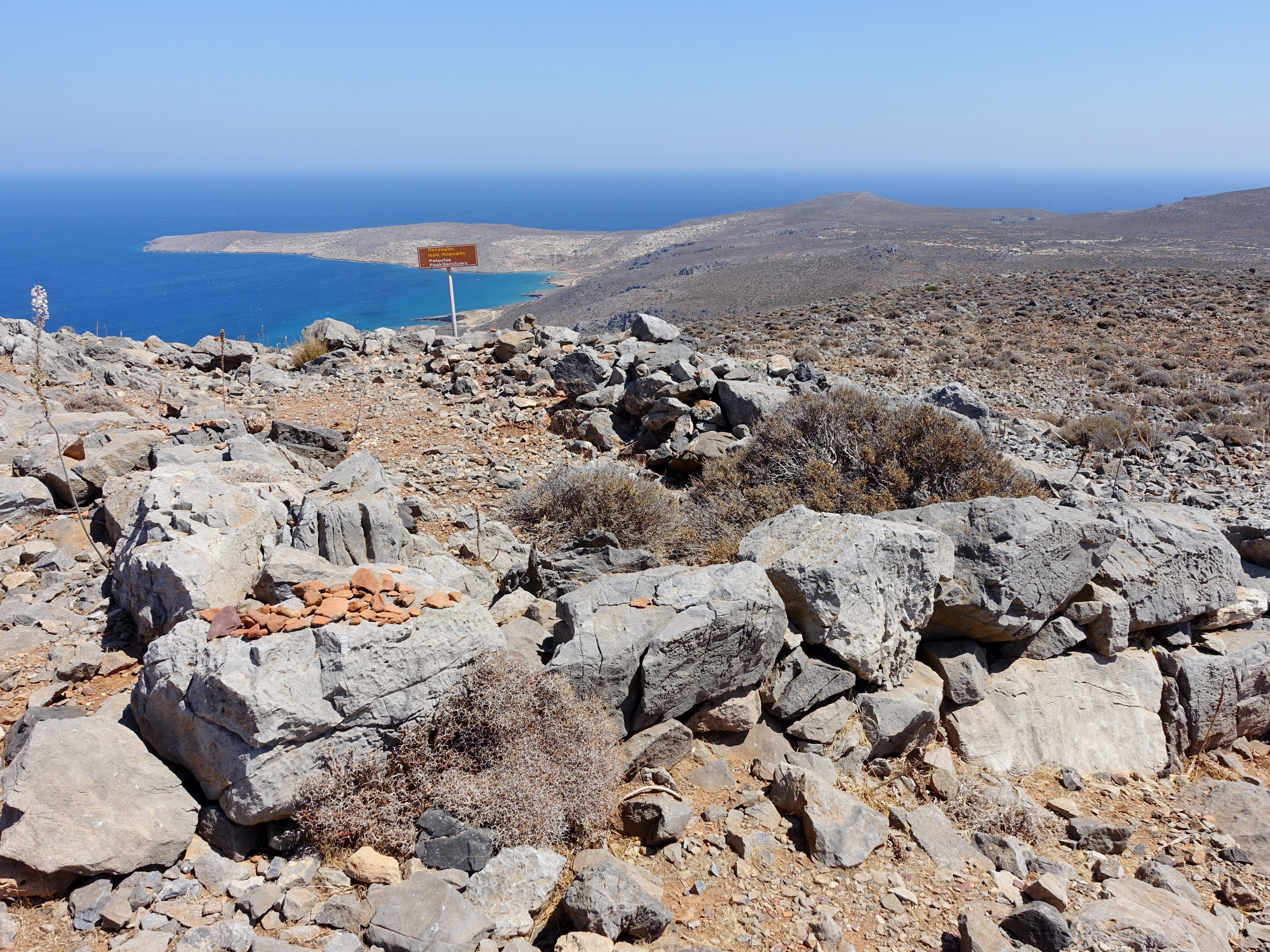
Peak sanctuaries such as the one at Petsophas were built around the time the palace sites, suggesting that earlier forms of worship were being formalized and institutionalized.

The palaces were built at sites that had been important communal spaces for a very long time. In particular, communal feasting is attested in the areas of the future Central Courts and West Courts dating back to the Neolithic. During the Early Minoan period, these areas were partly terraced and monumental buildings were constructed around them. These early buildings are poorly understood since much of their remains were obliterated by later construction. However, traces of early construction are found at Knossos throughout the area of the later palace, including a segment of a long wall dating to EM III (c. 2200–2100 BC), potentially suggesting development of the site as a whole. At Malia, early remains are substantial enough that some archaeologists have argued that there was full-fledged palace by EM III (c. 2200–2100 BC) and perhaps even a predecessor in EM II (c. 2650–2200 BC).

These early developments at palace sites occurred at the same time as similar construction at peak sanctuaries and sacred caves. These developments suggest that the palaces were built as part of a broader pattern of earlier traditions being institutionalized, with particular groups within Minoan society asserting control over important spaces and activities that would have taken place there. One proposal by Stuart Manning attributes these social developments to an expansion and subsequent contraction in international trade. During EM II (c. 2650–2200 BC), the Minoans had forged economic links around the eastern Mediterranean, creating a local culture of elite competition via imported prestige goods. When international trade collapsed during EM III (c. 2200–2100 BC), these goods would have become scarce, increasing the status of those who retained and controlled access to them.

=== Protopalatial palaces ===
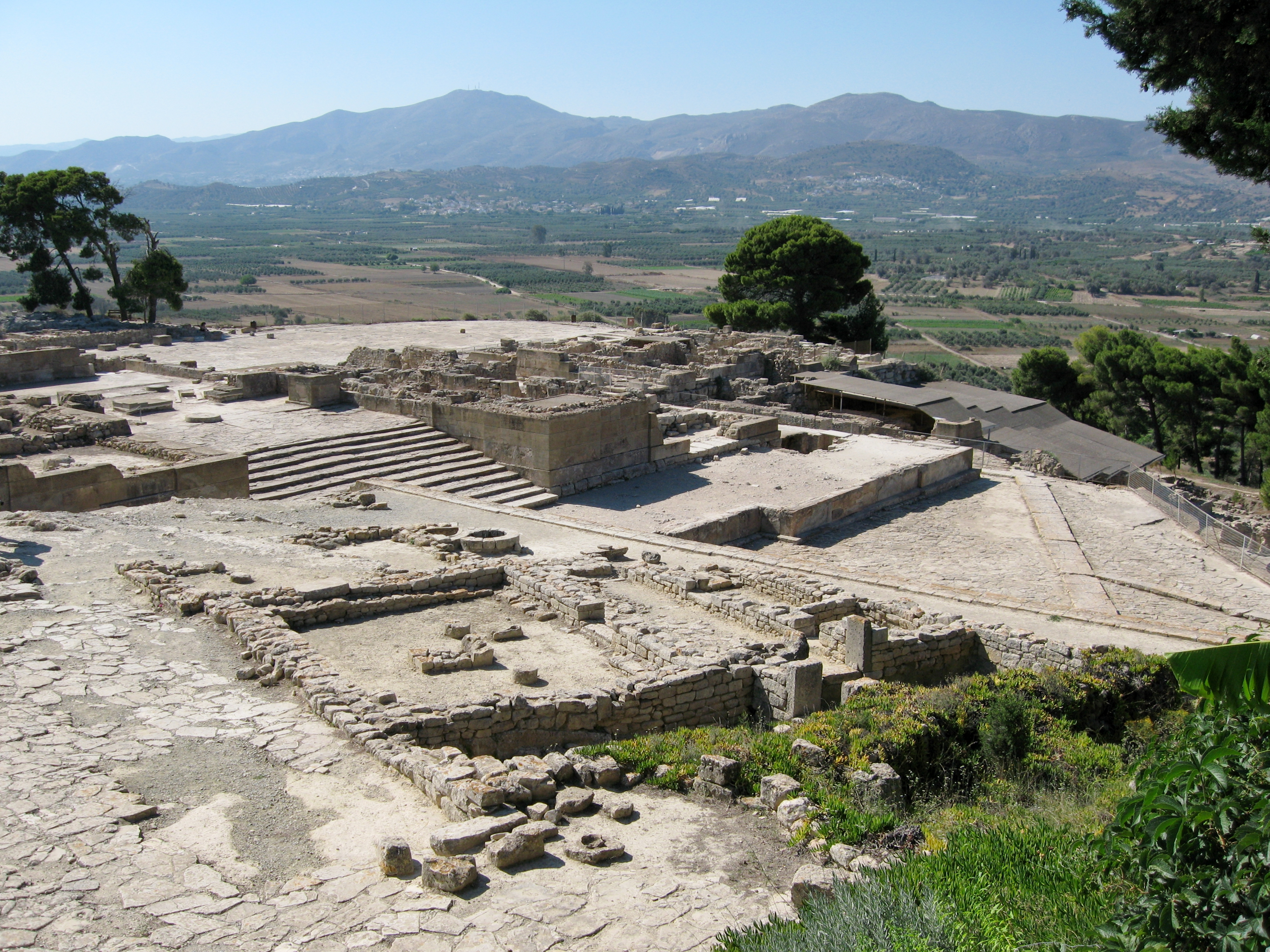
The Palace at Phaistos provides the clearest evidence about the Protopalatial era.

The first palaces are generally dated to MM IB (c. 1925–1875 BC). In this era, there were only three known palaces, namely those at Knossos, Phaistos, and Malia. Among them, Phaistos provides the clearest evidence for this period, since later renovations obscured much of the evidence at the other two sites. They appear to have been influenced by the Near Eastern tradition of monumental temples and palaces, which used ashlar masonry to signal the building's status. However, the Minoans adapted the style to suit their own purposes.

The Protopalatial palaces were a major architectural achievement that coincided with major building projects in the towns around them. However, they were smaller and less complex than their Neopalatial successors. They had a square-within-a-square layout, with fewer internal divisions than later on, and may have lacked later features such as orthostates and ashlar facades. The palaces were also more distinct from one another in this period.

The Protopalatial palaces at Knossos and Phaistos were destroyed at the end of MM IIB (c. 1700 BC), either by earthquakes or by violence.

=== Neopalatial palaces ===
During the Neopalatial Period, the palaces at Knossos, Phaistos, and Malia were rebuilt and new ones were constructed at Zakros and Galatas. At Knossos, rebuilding began during MM III (c. 1750–1700 BC), soon after the destruction of the earlier palace. However, the major construction projects from this period took place during LM IA (c. 1700–1625 BC), and Phaistos in particular may have been abandoned until then.

The Neopalatial palaces were more imposing than their predecessors, and their interiors were more complex. The renovations introduced more internal divisions and corridors, replacing the earlier bulky masses with a more articulated layout. The interiors were also more spacious and divisions more permeable, with collondes and pier-and-door partitions replacing earlier solid walls. Many of the archetypal palatial features appear to date from this era, including Lustral Basins and fresco painting. They are much more uniform in style than their predecessors, leading scholars to suspect that they were constructed by the same team.

The Neopalatial palaces were destroyed at the end of LM IB, with the exception of Knossos. At Knossos, the lower town was burned but the palace itself was not. These destructions have been attributed to warfare, either internal uprisings or external attack by Mycenaean Greeks.

=== Final Palace Period ===
During the Final Palace Period (LM II-IIIA, c. 1470-1330 BC), Knossos was rebuilt while the other palaces were left in ruins. In this era, Knossos was ruled by a Mycenaean Greek elite, who adopted a mixture of local Minoan cultural traditions and ones from the mainland. Many of the most famous rooms in the palace took their final form in this era, including the Throne Room and much of the residential quarters in the East Wing. The palace was extensively redecorated with new frescoes that adopted aspects of mainland Mycenaean iconography. These new frescoes abandoned earlier Minoan subjects such as fantastical nature scenes and ecstatic rituals, replacing them with figure-eight shields and processions of tribute-bearers. However, the new rulers continued the traditional Knossian use of bulls as a symbol of power. Bulls appear in one third of the surviving frescoes from this period, and in particular at the entrances and in the more ostentatious rooms.

In this period, administrative records were kept in Linear B which give a snapshot of palace economics. In contrast to the widely dispersed Linear A, most Linear B inscriptions were found at Knossos, suggesting a concentration of political and economic power. The tablets mention 100 place names, which seem economically tied to Knossos. The tablets record enormous quantities of goods, particularly sheep and textiles, but also grain and other produce. The quantities go far beyond what would be needed for local subsistence, suggesting that the palace administered a vibrant export economy. (Note: There is some controversy over the precise dating of these tablets. This article follows McEnroe (2010) in assuming that they date from LM IIIA, the period when Knossos was at its architectural zenith. However, others have argued that some or all of the tablets date from LM II-LM IIIB.)

The date of the final destruction of Knossos is unclear. It appears to have burned at the end of LM IIIA1 (c. 1370 BC) and possibly again at the end of LM IIIA2 (c. 1330 BC). In its final years, possibly during LM IIIB (c. 1330-1200 BC), it was partly restored as a merely utilitarian building. No new frescoes were painted, and collapsed colonnades and pier-and-door partitions were replaced with minimal rubble walls. Corridors were blocked off, elegant rooms were repurposed for storage, and even the cult rooms which were added were put in areas where they would not have been in earlier times.

=== After the palaces ===
The ruins of the palaces remained visible long after the end of the Minoan era. During the Early Iron Age they became places of open-air worship, as evidenced by deposits of votives. Later on, small shrines were constructed within the ruins, some of which persisted into the Roman era. While private houses may have been constructed at some palace sites such as Phaistos, the Classical era city of Knossos never encroached on the palace, even as it expanded dramatically over the surrounding area. Though the palaces sites seem to have been regarded as sacred, the ruins themselves were often quarried for spolia.

In 2025, six of the palaces (Knossos, Phaistos, Malia, Zakros, Zominthos and Kydonia) were designated as World Heritage Sites by UNESCO.

== Palace-like architecture ==
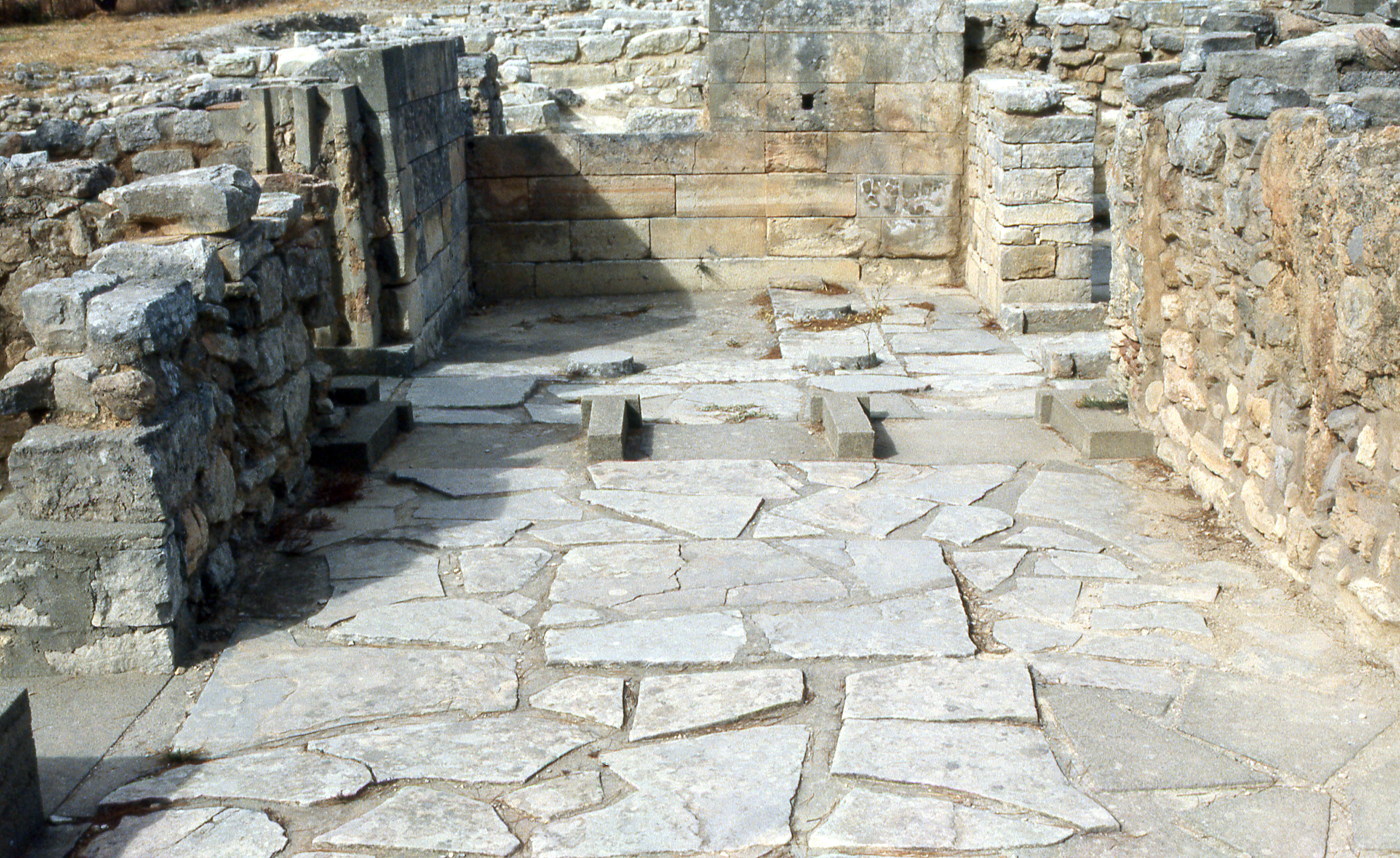
A Minoan Hall in a house at Tylissos shows the adoption of palace-like features in domestic architecture.

Minoan archaeologists generally reserve the term "palace" for five structures. However, many Minoan structures display some hallmarks of palacehood while lacking others. In a study of Minoan architecture, John McEnroe comments that "the distinction between 'Palatial' and 'non-Palatial' is often a matter of degree."

=== Palace-like buildings ===
Monumental buildings at Petras, Zominthos, Makrygiallos, Kommos, Monastiraki, and Archanes had palatial features such as central courts but otherwise do not pattern with the palaces in terms of form or function.

At Gournia, a monumental Neopalatial building adopted palatial features including a public court and an ashlar facade, and may have served a similar administrative function to the palaces. However, its layout and quality of masonry differ from the canonical palaces.

Similar considerations apply to a building at Petras, which mixes classic palatial features with characteristics adopted from earlier regional architectural traditions. The multistory building served as an administrative center with a central court and archives. It was also fortified, including with watchtowers. It had a central court, though a tiny one only 6m by 13m which was shrunk to 4.9 m by 12 m in later phases.

At Kommos, a grandiose structure known as Building T had a paved rectangular court surrounded by monumental wings much like the palaces. Comparable in size to the palace at Phaistos, its facade was constructed from the largest ashlars used by the Minoans. Because Kommos is thought to have been politically dependent on Phaistos and Hagia Triada, the presence of palatial architecture is a puzzle. In the words of excavator Joseph Shaw:

Could a relatively small and architecturally unpretentious town such as Kommos have promoted and maintained such an enormous structure, or have we misunderstood the palaces? Perhaps they were not so rare nor served such large regions as is generally supposed. Or perhaps in T we see an adaptation of the palace form for commercial purposes.

=== Palatialization ===
During the Neopalatial era, ordinary houses took on characteristics of palatial architecture including Minoan Halls, lustral basins, and mason's marks. This trend has been referred to as "palatialization". Alternate terms "Knossosification" and "the Versailles effect" have been proposed, though it is not clear that builders were imitating Knossos in particular. Though widely dispersed, palatialized houses were never the norm. Large settlements generally had at least one palatialized residence, but most houses were not palatialized.

== See also ==
- Egyptian pyramids
- Minoan art
- Palace economy
