= Stalida =

Stalida/stalis Σταλίδα
- Settlement
- Location within Greece
- Coordinates: 35°17′30″N 25°26′05″E
- Country: Greece
- Administrative region: Crete
- Regional unit: Heraklion
- Municipality: Hersonissos
- Municipal unit: Malia
- Community: Mochos
- Elevation: 10 m (33 ft)

Population (2021)
  - Total: 1,092
- Time zone: UTC+2 (EET)
  - Summer (DST): UTC+3 (EEST)
- Area code: 7007

Stalida (Greek: Σταλίδα, older form Stalis) is a village that lies between Malia and Hersonissos on the north coast of Crete, Greece. The name derives from the Greek verb stalizo, which means 'stop for a rest' as this was a location where shepherds and farms rested in between villages. It is a lively resort, attracting tourists from many European countries. It has a long, sandy beach and a variety of shops, bars and tavernas. From Stalis, the Bulgarian trail leads to Mochos village, built by the captive Bulgarians during WWII. In the village's main square, one finds the Byzantine church of St. Ioannis (St. John) dating back to 1600. Popular with families, it is 30 km from Nikos Kazantsakis airport in Heraklion.

== Resort ==
Quieter than the neighbouring resorts of Malia and Hersonissos, Stalis has a more relaxed atmosphere and still has a wide array of bars and restaurants. The resort is popular with a mix of nationalities.

== Origins ==
Stalida began as the name which translates as a place to 'stop for a rest' for shepherds or as a summer recreation place of the locals of the village mochos. Stalida has not existed as an autonomous village till the 20th century which can be noted in its layout lacking a village centre. The village began to develop a lot in the 1960s were tourism would explode bringing in more: shops, hotels, bars, etc. from the people of mochos who moved towards the job opportunities.

== Gallery ==
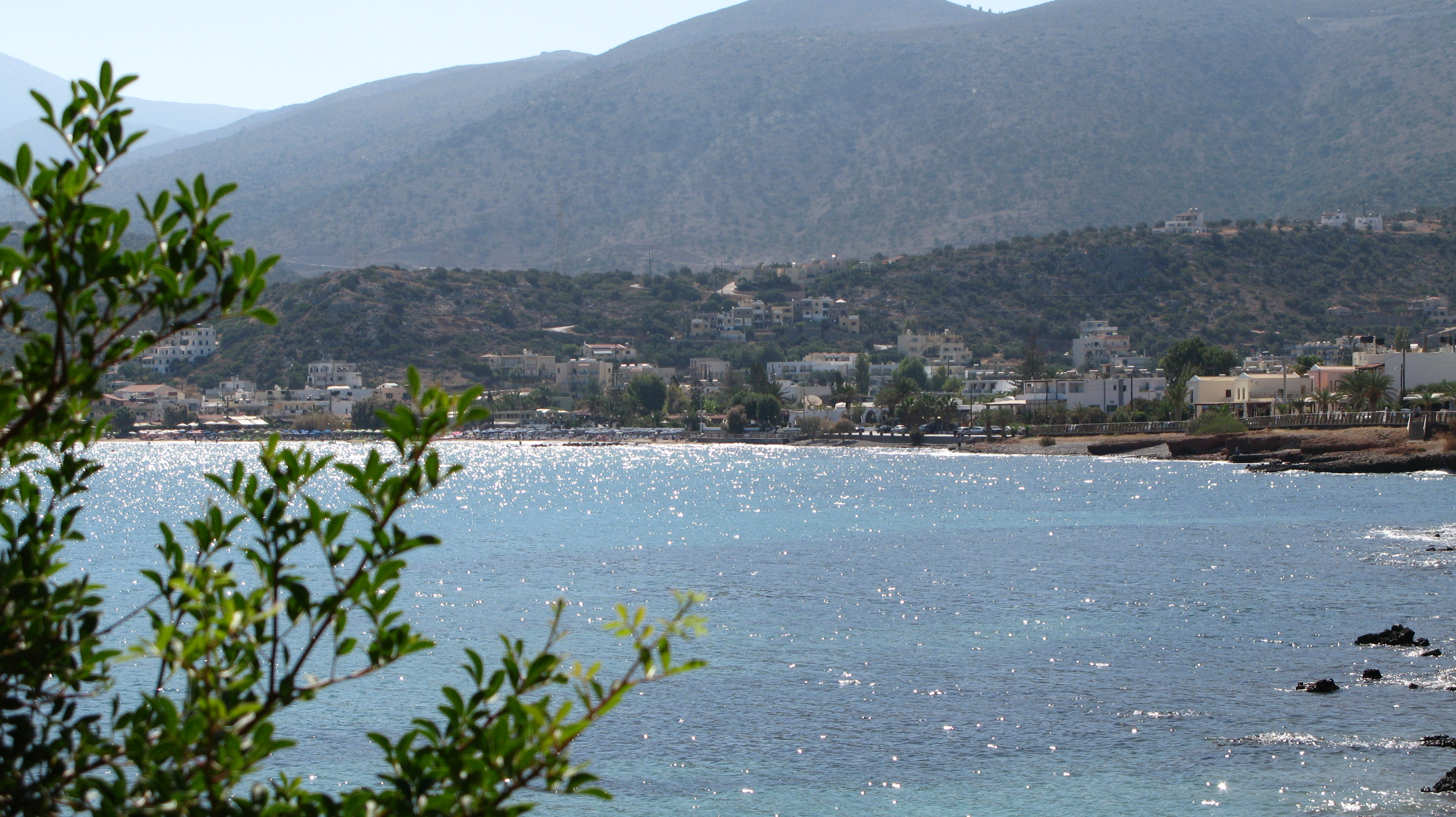
A view of the town of Stalis

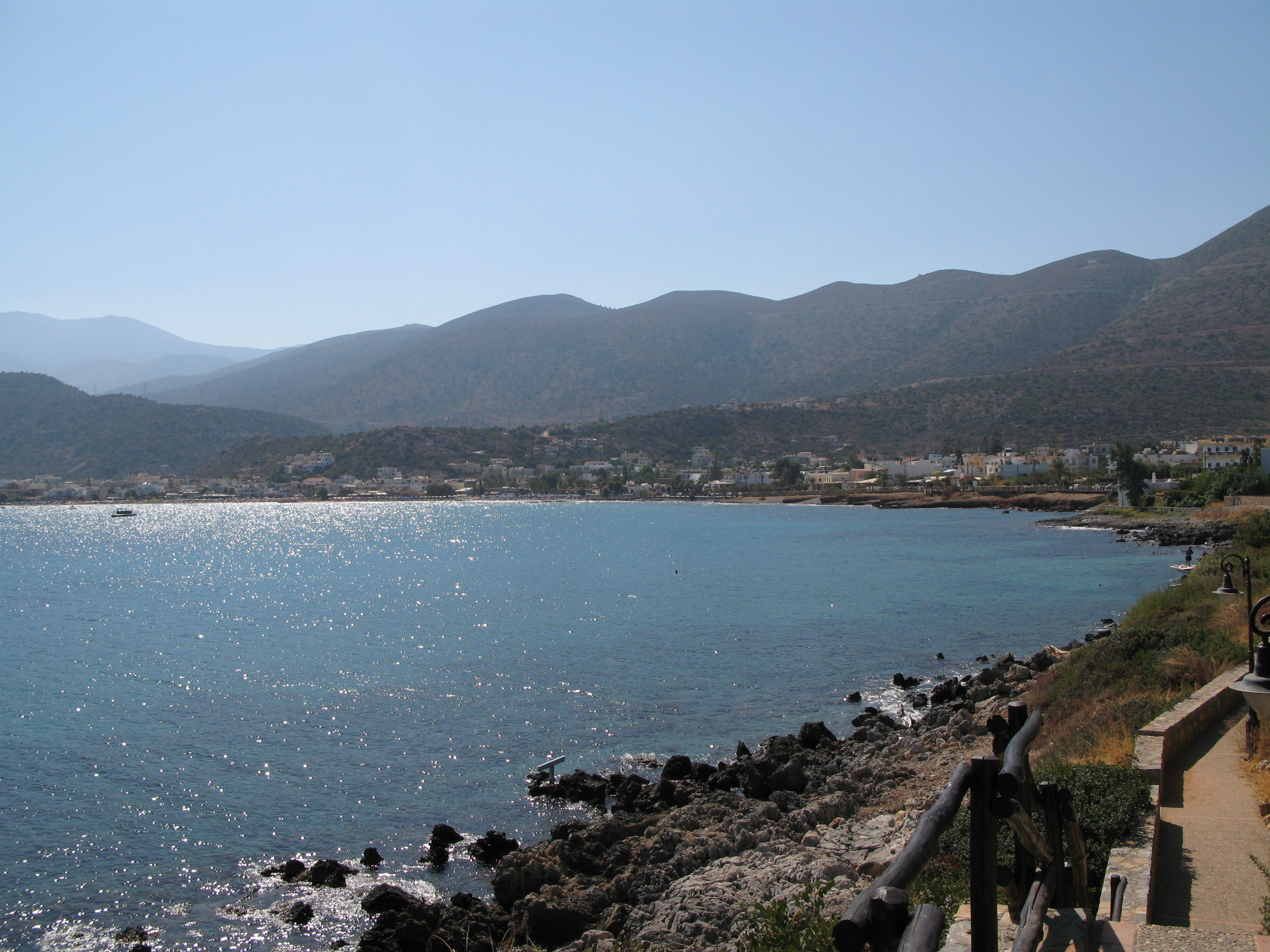
A view of the town of Stalis
