= Petras =

- Πετράς (Greek)
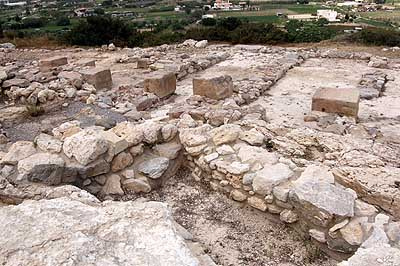
- View of the Petras archaeological site

- Location within Greece
- 35°11′49.5″N 26°6′53.7″E
- Type: Minoan settlement
- Periods: Minoan
- Location: Sitia, Crete, Greece
- Region: Lasithi

History
- Built: circa 3000 BC
- Abandoned: circa 1450 BC

Site notes
- Elevation: 11 m (36 ft)
- Excavation dates: Yes
- Archaeologists: Metaxia Tsipopoulou
- Condition: Ruins
- Public access: Yes

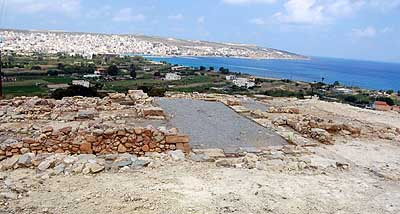
Petras site

Petras (Greek: Πετράς) is the archaeological site of an ancient Minoan town on northeastern Crete. It includes a building which shows strong similarities with Minoan palaces and is sometimes labeled as a palace.

== Architecture ==
The architecture of Petras consisted mainly of a palace and houses attached built on terraces which contained storerooms, workshops and living quarters. Two houses known as House 1 and House 2 were uncovered which give insights into the societal practices of Petras. A hieroglyphic archive was also discovered during excavations.

The region where Petras became archeologically known through the work of Metaxia Tsipopoulou and only became part of the discourse in 1985. Petras is termed a ‘palace’ due to its architectural similarities with the customary classification of other palaces from that region. Its discovery resulted in a shift in understanding of the nature of palaces in Minoan Crete. The palatial building takes up more than 2000 square meters of the site and was protected with a wall to the east and to the west.

The palace was situated here because of its proximity to a river overlooking a maritime bay. The maritime bay allowed for safe anchorage and the river may have been a transport axis. The palace was surrounded by villas, farmsteads and an industrial area. The palace was built in two phases and eventually collapsed due to intense fire. The settlement is dated back to the Early Minoan period and is believed to have been inhabited until 1450 BCE.

Two houses known as House 1 and House 2 were uncovered and are dated back to the New Palace period (1600-1450 BCE). These are believed to have later been abandoned and destroyed by a fire. In House 1 a stone-built staircase connects two terraces attached to rooms. The lower terrace contained two storerooms and two kitchens. The upper terrace was found to be a burial ground of an infant. This burial ground was inside a workshop made of stone. House 2 was constructed in two phases and contained a reception hall area which was later converted into a workshop for dying wool. Situated around 2 km from the modern-day Greek town of Siteia, the main complex was extensively used to store produce, totalling in around 200 square meters of storage space by the end of its construction. There was also a hieroglyphic archive which was excavated in Petras and is thought to have been created for administrative purposes. Metaxia Tsipopoulou believed that the archive was still in use when the structure was destroyed. Various medallions, clay bars, nodules and crescents were found with inscriptions on them.

== The palace ==
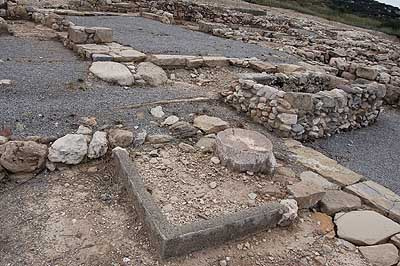

The first phase of the palatial building shows that the palace is surrounded by a large wall to the east and the north, with a bastion-like structure protruding from it. More than one third of the plateau consists of the central administrative building. The central court area is smaller than similar palaces, and it includes an enormous staircase which accesses it. The second phase of the palatial building shows that the large staircase had stopped being used and was instead covered by a new court above the older court. During this phase storage spaces were added near the staircase.

The palatial building connected to an industrial area which was situated higher up compared to the main complex. In this location vases, potters’ wheels fragments and raw material have been excavated. Connecting these two areas was likely a garden because no nothing was found in this space for excavation. All these factors combine to decipher that Petras was a palatial centre. A main reason for this is thought to be its geographical location, not far from a river and overlooking a large bay. This would have allowed for transport to and from the palatial centre.

Petras was surrounded by a settlement owing to the findings such as several farmsteads and villas surrounding the area. The villas surrounding the palace are thought to have functioned subordinately, allowing the palace to reign through them into the outlying settlements. These settlements would have provided produce and sent it up towards the palace. The farmsteads were where people lived who worked on the fields and orchards. These two areas are thought to have been a part of a religious network which made up the Petras region.

There is a particular model which decided if a certain archaeological site can be considered a palace. This constitutes an administrative centre which is responsible for a certain region and is called the “palace model”.

== Objects ==
Many objects were found during the excavations at Petras. These discoveries were made mainly in the cemetery and in what’s known as House 1 and House 2. Amongst these are cooking vessels, figurines of different size and shapes as well as tools used for making textiles. A unique piece of jewellery containing a lapis lazuli was also excavated.

Cooking vessels such as pots and pans as well as tripod cooking pots were found at during archaeological excavations in Petras. Many middle Minoan and some early Minoan works of pottery have also been excavated at the site in Petras. Black or white cups, for example with a fish motif, as well as part of an incense burner were excavated. Miniature vessels which now make up a part of the vessels found from Bronze Age Crete were found in both the palace of Petras and the surrounding town. There are two types of miniature vessels, one being handmade and the other wheel made. Most of these vessels are undecorated. The fabric of the vessels which were found in Petras House 1 and House 2 is very fine and may have used different firing techniques.

Figurines were also found in House 1 and House 2. Notably the House 1 figurine remnants are made of bovine shapes such as horns, legs, bodies and horns of consecration, some with red or orange paint on them. The largest example of the bovine body measures around 14 cm. In House 2 only one figurine was excavated which resembles a human torso with breasts, unpainted and made of local stock. Tools have also been uncovered at Petras which were used in the making of textiles, consisting of nearly a hundred loom weights and one spindle whorl.

A gold bead was excavated from the Petras cemetery and is unusual because it contains a lapis lazuli. This gemstone was rare in the Aegean region during the Middle Bronze Age. It is also an unusual piece of jewellery because it was made without any visible solder. It can be concluded that the joins were made with copper diffusion bonding which has been documented to be in use since the Early Bronze age around Anatolia. Only one of the two stones remain in place and the bead is damaged. Some features suggest that it was imported into Crete from the Mediterranean. The Lapis lazuli is the name given to the mineral lazurite which may have originated from Tajikistan or Afghanistan. More than a dozen other lapis lazuli pieces are known to have been found from archaeological sites around Crete.

== Cemetery ==
The Petras cemetery is significant in understanding the cultural practices and rituals of their society. This can be understood through the examination of burial practices such as the interference with the bones of the deceased and vessels that contain skeletal remains. It has also been concluded that the cemetery was used as a site for gatherings.

Located on the coast of Crete, the Petras cemetery contains twenty-four house tombs. Through the study of the positions of the skeletal remains, aspects of the social rituals of the Petras society can be understood. For example, some bones were found to be comingled to create more space, and old tombs were built upon to create new tombs which alludes to the social values they would have held of a collective past. Burial containers were also at times used to dispose of human remains according to archaeological findings. These included vessels such as a wine press which was excavated at the cemetery in Petras. This contained the skeletal remains of an adult and three infants, and evidence suggests that the skeletal remains of each were rearranged as new remains were added. A cup was also found nearby which had been turned upside down, a common ritual of the era which signalled a liquid offering had taken place.

By studying the site of Petras in Minoan Crete, aspects of social organisation can be deciphered. The Petras house tomb cemetery sheds light on the multi layered mortuary practices of the last decade of the Bronze Age in the Aegean region. After extensive studies evidence has been found that the society purposely interfered with human remains, therefore it seems that there was a continuous relationship between the society, and it’s deceased. This is evident in the systematic removal and relocation of the bones. The society at Petras, used the site of the cemetery as a frequent gathering point, for example for the purpose of hosting feasts and performances. There is also evidence that a minority of bones show proof of firing as a disposal method, while the remains have been found to be in different stages of decomposition.

== Mammalian faunal remains ==
A moderate selection of mammalian faunal remains were found between 1985 and 1990. They were found during the excavation of House 1 and were only studied in 2011. Some bones that were found were complete while others were fragments. The animals they belonged to included pigs, sheep, cattle, dogs, deer and goats. There were also teeth found within the mammalian faunal remains. The fact that scavengers may have interfered with the remains after humans discarded them is also taken into consideration when studying the remains, determined by markers such as gnawing marks. Things such as burning marks or butchery marks allow us to analyse cooking methods utilised at the time.

Most mammalian faunal remains date back to the Neopalatial period when the houses were most in use. Studying these allow an insight into how the spaces were used and what time of activities took place at Petras, such as cooking, butchery and carcass processing and management practices. When it comes to preservation it is interesting to note that gnawed specimens of mammalian faunal remains were very modest. Many bones were found to be damaged by trampling or weight after they were discarded rather than because of animal gnawing. Burning was not commonly used for the destruction of the bones. Because not much animal interference was found when observing mammalian faunal remains, it allows for a better understanding of human behaviour at Petras.

To understand the processing, management and consumption of the animals it is important to look at factors such species and body part representations within the site of Petras. Something that suggests that animals were slaughtered and consumed in the same area is the presence of all the important body parts of the carcasses. These include animals such as cattle, goats, pigs and sheep. There is only one deer and one dog specimen which makes it impossible to understand whether these animals were eaten or not. We can decipher that knives and cleavers were used because of the marks left on the carcasses. However, there is an absence of dismembering marks on the remains meaning that complete carcasses were likely roasted on open fires or spits. Some bones were found in interior spaces but most of them were found in the open yards, and their dogs were able to access both spaces apparently. Interestingly many loose teeth from male pigs were found which points to the possibility that they were kept as some type of trophy after a feast.

== Marine faunal remains ==
Marine resources seem to have played a large role in the lives of the Petras community as around 3000 marine faunal remains have been recovered in the area. These were recovered around House 1, by hand while excavating the area using limited wet and dry sieving. This means that smaller marine faunal remains are mostly absent resulting in a biased representation. Fishing has been proven to take place at Petras because two copper alloy fishhooks were found during excavations. Most of the shells found were in closed spaces however some were found in the courtyards. The marine faunal remains that were found mainly point to food consumption.

== Trade ==
Petras was a community which made up part of a network of communities who traded together. This was done using longboats which had the capacity to travel long distances. Weapons, tools, ornaments, pottery and raw materials were used to trade between these communities in the Aegean region.

During the early Bronze Age, and arguably as far back as the end of the Neolithic, it is understood that long distance trading emerged in the Aegean region. This was done through the so-called longboat trading model whereby static communities situated in maritime networks engaged in trade. This model came to an end with the emergence of the masted sailing ship. The site of Petras appears to be representative of the earliest known gateway communities during the Bronze Age. The model encompasses the interaction between long distance trading through gateway communities with the use of the longboat. Trade differed from the concept of gift exchange which aimed at obtaining commodities rather than building a social relationship.

Early Bronze age trading is believed to have been constituted of establishing long distance relationships which enabled exchange of objects, raw materials and new technologies. Until this model was established, the maritime communities had been operating independently. However, their uniqueness became less apparent as this model evolved throughout the Bronze Age. This trade model was enabled by the invention of the longboat which allowed long distance travel. At the same time, metal became a sought-after commodity due to its use for weapons and tools.

Body ornaments were also found at Petras, specifically eight small objects which were similar and therefore believed to have had the same origin, as well as a shell pendant. These are believed to have been found at the site of Petras because of trade and exchange practices of the time. Through the study of different types of pottery discovered at the archaeological site of Petras, it can be concluded that the technology didn’t evolve in increments but rather at a continuous pace because of their trade practices.

== Bibliography ==
- Metaxia Tsipopoulou & Erik Hallager, The Hieroglyphic Archive at Petras, Siteia (with contributions by Cesare D’Annibale & Dimitra Mylona). Monographs of the Danish Institute at Athens, volume 9. The Danish Institute at Athens. Athens, 2010 ISBN 978-87-7934-293-4 (final publication) Download PDF File 59.56 MB
- Tsipopoulou, Metaxia (2016). Petras, Siteia I: A Minoan Palatial Settlement in Eastern Crete: Excavation of Houses I.1 and I.2. INSTAP Academic Press. ISBN 978-1-62303-408-5.
- Tsipopoulou, Metaxia; Nodarou, Eleni (2021). Petras, Siteia: a Minoan palatial settlement in eastern Crete, late Bronze Age pottery from houses I.1 and I.2. Philadelphia (Penn.): INSTAP Academic Press. ISBN 9781931534321.
- External bibliography at 'Petras Excavations'
