= Throne Room, Knossos =

Throne Room at Knossos
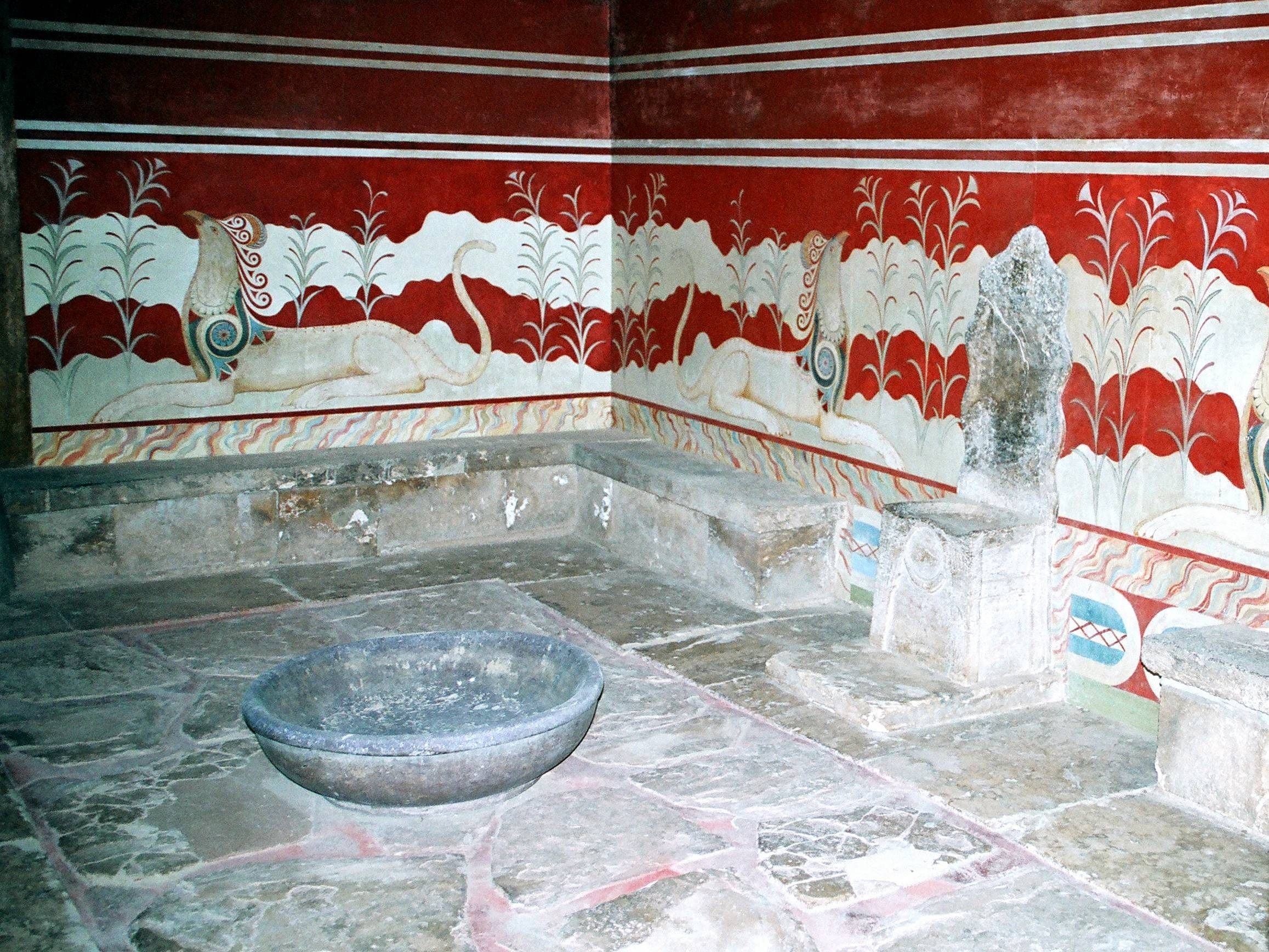
- The reconstructed Throne Room
- Interactive map of Throne Room at Knossos
- Location: Knossos

History
- Formed: 15th century BC/ 1899-1955
- Built for: Ceremonial and religious purposes

Site notes
- Area: Crete, Greece

The Throne Room was a chamber built for ceremonial purposes during the 15th century BC inside the palatial complex of Knossos, Crete, in Greece. It is found at the heart of the Bronze Age palace of Knossos, one of the main centers of the Minoan civilization and is considered the oldest throne room in Europe.

== Environment ==
The throne room was unearthed in 1900 by British archaeologist Arthur Evans, during the first phase of his excavations in Knossos. It was found in the center of the palatial complex and west of the central court. This throne room is considered the oldest stone throne of the Aegean region, indeed the oldest in Europe. The chamber contains an alabaster seat on the north wall, identified by Evans as a "throne", while two Griffins rest on each side are staring at it. Moreover, on three sides it contains gypsum benches. It was part of a larger suite that also included an anteroom and an inner chamber with a ledge that was possibly a chapel. The throne room was accessed from the anteroom through two double doors. According to Evans's estimates, a total of thirty people could be accommodated both in the throne room and its anteroom. The room received its final form in Late Minoan IIIA period, since it was a latter addition to the palace that occurred during the last phase of occupation after 1450 BC.

== Purpose ==
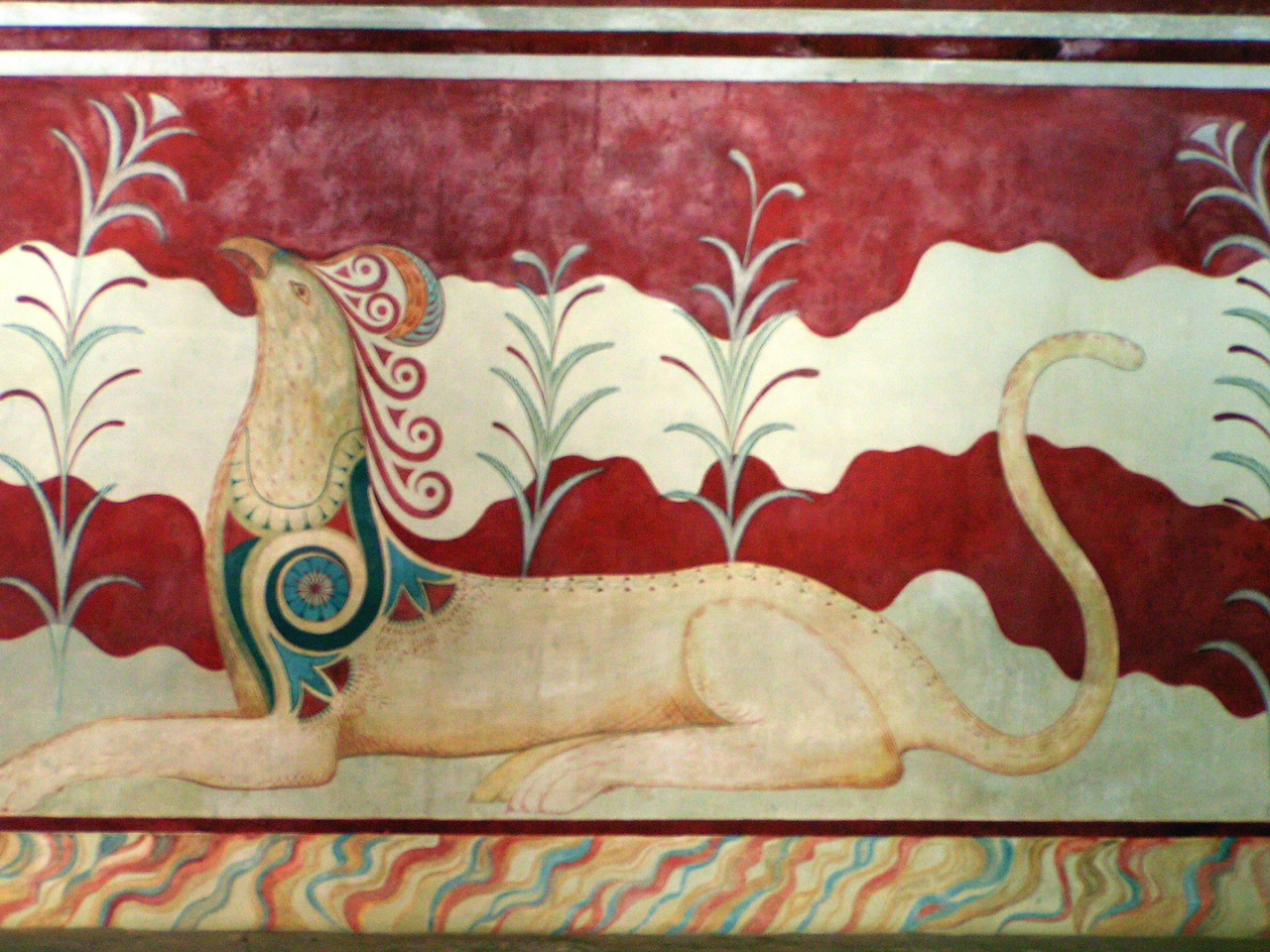
One of the two Griffins facing the throne

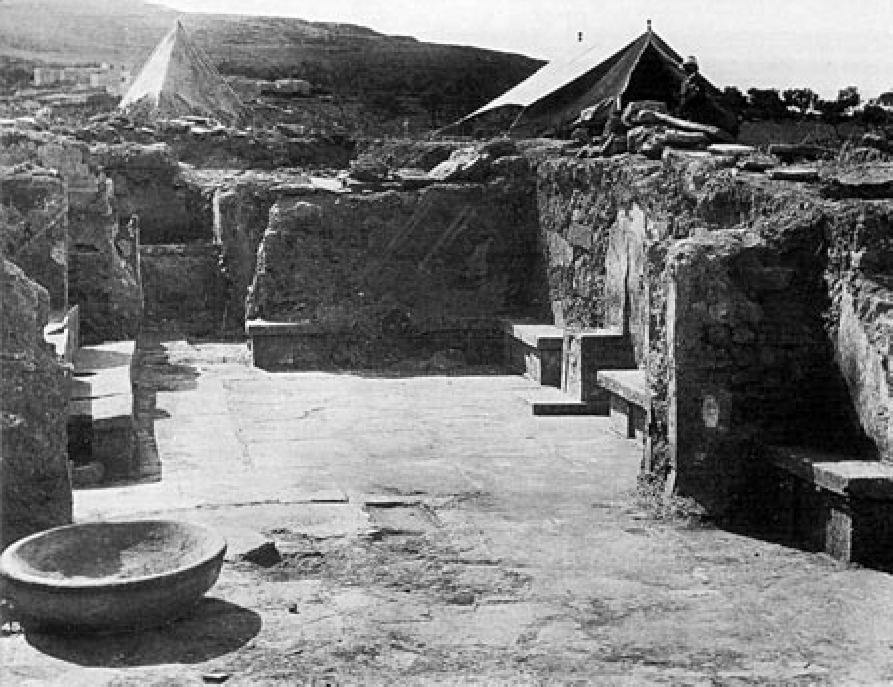
The throne room prior to reconstruction.

Initially, Evans believed that this area was designed to serve a religious purpose, while he claimed that this was the priest-king's seat and that the presence of the griffins confirmed that this king was somehow beyond mortal realms. He also identified the stone throne as the seat of the mythical king of Crete, Minos, evidently applied Greek mythology. On the other hand, archaeologists Helga Reusch and Friedriech Matz suggested that the throne room was a sanctuary of a female divinity and that a priestess who sat there was her impersonator. The stone benches around the walls suggest a sitting council or perhaps a court, while a sunken area, called by Evans a "lustral basin", partially partitioned off at one side, was used for ritual bathing. In view of the civil and religious powers held by the king, there can be little argument against the notion that proceedings of an official character began with sacred ceremonials.

According to various views, the throne itself may have actually had more religious than political significance, functioning in the re-enactment of epiphany rituals involving a High Priestess, as suggested by the iconography of griffins, palms, and altars in the wall-paintings. More recently, it has been suggested that the room was only used at dawn at certain times of the year for specific ceremonies.

== Mycenaean influence ==
Various archaeologists claim that the room and its furniture most likely date to the time of the Mycenaean takeover circa after 1450 BC when political conditions in Crete were entirely different, as indicated by the concurrent appearance of elite tombs, individual burials and the presence of the Mycenaean Greek Linear B script. At that time, the palace at Knossos seems to have been modified in a minor way in order to include features such as the throne room. Especially, the stylized paintings of heraldically opposed griffins were popular in later era Mycenaean wall painting but not seen before in Crete. For instance, similar wall decoration was also found in the throne room of the Mycenaean palace of Pylos in the Peloponnese.

== See also ==
- List of Aegean frescos

== Sources ==
- Budin, Stephanie Lynn (2004). The Ancient Greeks: New Perspectives. Santa Barbara, California: ABC-CLIO. ISBN 978-1-57607-814-3.
- Cunliffe, Barry (2001). The Oxford Illustrated History of Prehistoric Europe. New York, New York: Oxford University Press. ISBN 978-0-19-285441-4.
- Driessen, Jan (2003). "The Court Compounds of Minoan Crete: Royal Palaces or Ceremonial Centers?". Athena Review. 3 (3). Université Catholique de Louvain: 57–61. Archived from the original on 2009-02-21.
- Hooper, Finley (1978) [1967]. Greek Realities: Life and Thought in Ancient Greece. Detroit, Illinois: Wayne State University Press. ISBN 978-0-8143-1597-2.
- Marinatos, Nanno (2010). Minoan Kingship and the Solar Goddess: A Near Eastern Koine. Urbana, Illinois: University of Illinois Press. ISBN 978-0-252-03392-6.
- McEnroe, John C. (2010). Architecture of Minoan Crete: Constructing Identity in the Aegean Bronze Age. Austin, Texas: University of Texas Press. ISBN 978-0-292-72193-7.
- Runnels, Curtis Neil; Murray, Priscilla (2001). Greece before History: An Archaeological Companion and Guide. Stanford, California: Stanford University Press. ISBN 978-0-8047-4050-0.
