= Adyton =

Most sacred inner room of an Ancient Greek or Roman temple

Location of the adyton within a temple

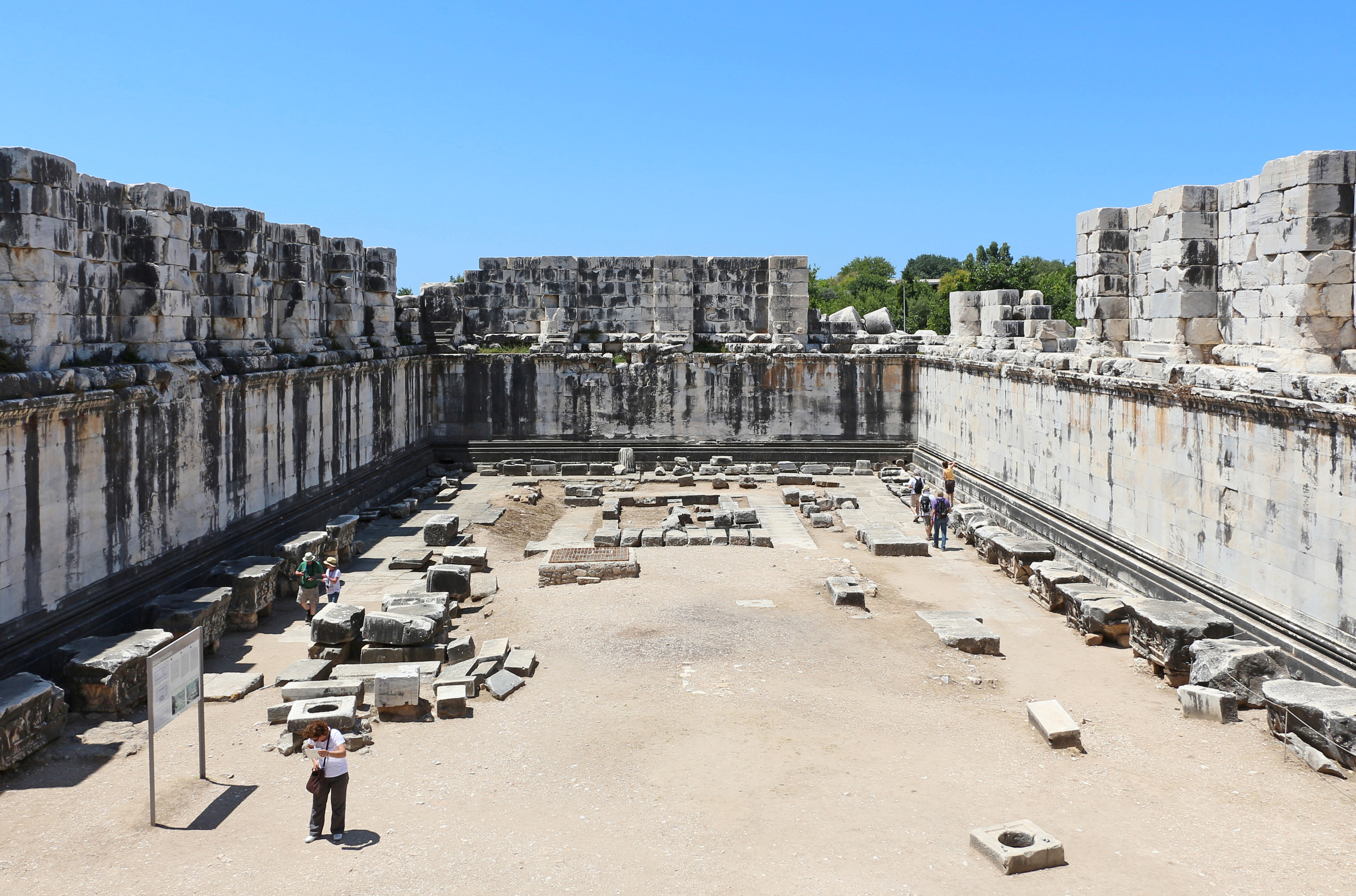
The adyton in the Temple of Apollo in Didyma

In Classical architecture, the adyton (Ancient Greek: ἄδῠτον [ádyton], 'innermost sanctuary, shrine', lit. 'not to be entered') or adytum (Latin) was a restricted area within the cella of a Greek or Roman temple. The adyton was frequently a small area at the furthest end of the cella from the entrance. At Delphi, it measured just 9 by 12 feet (2.7 by 3.7 m). The adyton would often house the cult image of the deity.

Adyta were spaces reserved for oracles, priestesses, priests, or acolytes, and not for the general public. Adyta were found frequently associated with temples of Apollo, as at Didyma, Bassae, Clarus, Delos, and Delphi, although they were also said to have been natural phenomena (see the story of Nyx). Those sites had often been dedicated to deities whose worship preceded that of Apollo and may go back to prehistoric eras, such as Delphi, but who were supplanted by the time of Classical Greek culture.

In modern scholarship, the term may denote the innermost sacred space of a temple in the ancient Near Eastern cultures predating Classical Greece, such as ancient Israel. It is also known by various names such as "holy of holies" and "debir". The term is sometimes extended to similar spaces in other cultural contexts, as in Egyptian temples or the Western mystery school, Builders of the Adytum.

The term abaton (Koine Greek: ἄβατον, [ábaton], 'inaccessible'), in modern Greek avato (Greek: άβατο, [ˈavato]) is used in the same sense in Greek Orthodox tradition, usually of the parts of monasteries accessible only to monks or male visitors.

Endingless variants of the term, adyt or adyte (plural: adites, addittes, adyts) are found in English as early as the late 16th century. By the early 19th century, the term acquired a figurative meaning, referring to the innermost parts of any structure or of the human psyche.

== See also ==
- Holy of Holies
- Lustral basin
- Garbhagriha
- Mahavira Hall and hondō – sometimes translated as adytum
- Inner sanctum
- Sanctuary
- Sanctum sanctorum

== Sources ==
- Broad, William J. The Oracle: The lost secrets and hidden messages of ancient Delphi. Penguin Press, 2006.
