= Kouloura =

Circular subsurface pit found in Ancient Crete

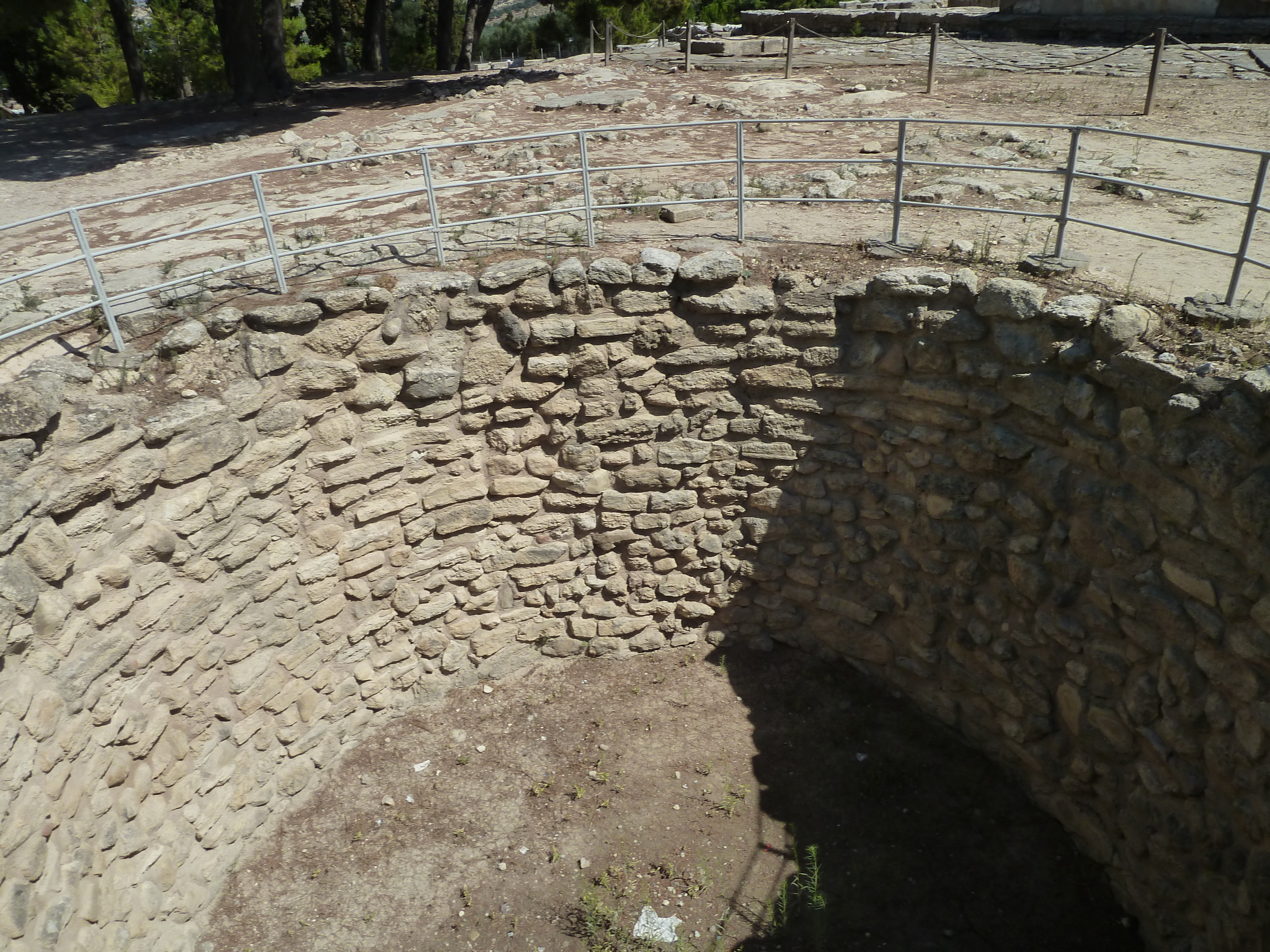
Armon Knossos P1050995

A kouloura, or kouloures (Greek plural koulourai), is a circular subsurface pit with stone walls found in certain settlements within Ancient Crete, including the Minoan palaces at Phaistos, Knossos, and Malia. According to the stratigraphy, the kouloura were all constructed around MM II (1850–1750 BC).

== Etymology ==
The name kouloura was coined by Arthur Evans during his expedition to Knossos in 1903. He named the pits after kouloura, the round Greek bread, because of the similar shape of the two objects.

== Discovery and locations ==
The first four kouloures were discovered in 1903 at Knossos by Arthur Evans. Subsequently, Fernand Chapouthier discovered eight additional kouloura at Malia, and the duo of Luigi Pernier and Doro Levi unearthed four at Phaistos. These pits have always been found within the confines of major sites, including the West Court of Knossos and the Upper Court of Phaistos.

== Function ==
Multiple theories have been put forward regarding the function of these kouloura in Ancient Minoan culture. However, there are only three majorly supported theories.

- Arthur Evans, the original discoverer of the pits, theorized that they were garbage pits due to the lack of cement walling to prevent water seepage.
- Chapouthier and Pernier believed that they were actually ancient cisterns, based on the presence of a long water trough in one of the kouloura at Knossos. However, the flaw in this theory remains that most of the pits contained no form of waterproofing, a concept which was familiar to other civilizations around this time period.
- The most commonly accepted theory is that the kouloura were a type of granary to store excess harvest. This belief grew out of the fact that kingdoms during the Minoan period grew largely out of ability to store, maintain, and distribute food goods.

== See also ==
- Pithos
