= Margherita Guarducci =

Italian archaeologist, classical scholar, and epigrapher (1902-1999)

- Born: 20 December 1902; Florence, Kingdom of Italy
- Died: 2 September 1999 (aged 96); Rome, Italy
- Education: Italian School of Archaeology at Athens
- Scientific career
- Fields: Archaeology; Greek epigraphy

Margherita Guarducci (20 December 1902 – 2 September 1999) was an Italian archaeologist, classical scholar, and epigrapher. She was a major figure in several crucial moments of the 20th-century academic community. A student of Federico Halbherr, she edited his works after his death. She was the first woman to lead archaeological excavations at the Vatican, succeeding Ludwig Kaas, and completed the excavations on Saint Peter's tomb, identifying finds as relics of Saint Peter. She also engaged in discussions on the authenticity of the Praeneste fibula, arguing that its inscription is a forgery.

== Career ==
Guarducci received her diploma in Bologna in 1924. She attended the National School of Archeology in Rome starting in 1927 onwards, then relocated to Athens. She was one of the first Italian women scholars to practice archaeology in Greece. While there, she was appointed director of the Scuola Alessandro Della Seta and headed up excavations on the island of Crete. Guarducci was one of the top archaeologists of the Italian Archaeological Mission at Crete, sponsored by the Italian Archaeological School of Athens. In this capacity, she published the work of her advisor Halbherr – the Inscriptiones Creticae, which included inscriptions in Greek and Latin on the island of Crete. She also worked on excavating artifacts related to the Gortyn code and is most noted for her publications regarding that inscription.

In 1931, Guarducci was appointed chair of Ancient Greek epigraphy at the University of Rome "La Sapienza", serving in this capacity until 1950. Beginning in 1956, Guarducci was affiliated with the Accademia Nazionale dei Lincei, and appointed as a member of the Pontificia Accademia Romana di Archeologia in 1969.

Later, Guarducci returned to La Sapienza as a docent, where she taught Epigraphy and Ancient Greek until 1973. She was appointed director of the National School of Archeology in Rome, remaining in that role until 1978. While teaching Greek epigraphy, Guarducci wrote four volumes and a compendium on the subject, spanning its origins until the late Roman Empire. At the end of her academic career, she was named Professor Emerita at La Sapienza.

During her career, Guarducci received two honorary degrees from the Università Cattolica di Milano and the University of Rennes. Her works are now published by Istituto Poligrafico e Zecca dello Stato.

=== Crete and the Inscriptiones Creticae ===
While working in Crete, Guarducci met Federico Halbherr, then a student of archeology from Florence's Domenico Comparetti. Guarducci began collaborating with Halbherr and became his favorite pupil during the excavations of the Cretan city of Gortyna. Her work there continued after the death of Halbherr in 1930, when the project fell under the direction of the Cretan Louis Pernier. At this point, Guarducci, whose interests lay primarily in epigraphy, took on the task of completing Halbherr's life's work, which was to compile a single work of the Greek and Latin inscriptions of Crete after the 7th century BC. She began a long period of investigation throughout the island, verifying the accuracy of the earlier readings of Halbherr, making corrections and adding new information.

Between 1935 and 1950, while she was a faculty member at La Sapienza, Guarducci published the result of twenty years of research entitled the Inscriptiones Creticae. This work is considered the definitive collection of epigraphic entries, as well as the major compilation of the archeology and topography of the ancient city of Gortyna in Crete. The work is in four volumes based on geography (Central Crete, Western Crete, Eastern Crete, and Gortyna), and bears the full title of Inscriptiones Creticae, opera et consilio Friderici Halbherr collectae, Guarducci curavit Margarita, and is written in Latin. Individual volumes bear the following titles (with a year of publication):

- Tituli Cretæ mediæ præter Gortynios (Inscriptions of central Crete except Gortyna) (1935)
- Tituli Cretæ occidentalis (Inscriptions of western Crete) (1939)
- Tituli Cretæ orientalis (Inscriptions of eastern Crete) (1942)
- Tituli Gortynii (Inscriptions of Gortyna) (1950)

Each volume is accompanied by an extensive bibliography divided into two sections: archaeology and epigraphs. Introductions explain archaeological, topographical, and antiquarian aspects of the areas treated. Entries include photographs, illustrations of epigraphs, transcripts, and extensive commentary.

=== Gortyn Code ===
In the fourth volume, which focuses on the city of Gortyna, Guarducci addressed the so-called Great Law (or Grand Inscription) of Gortyna (Inscr. Cret., Vol. IV, n.72), discovered by Federico Halbherr in 1884.

The inscription, part of a building used as the Odeon, is engraved on a concave wall about 8 m long and 175 cm high. It is grouped into twelve columns of boustrophedon writing. This is a type of writing that gradually alternates from left to right, writing a line backward, then reversing from right to left, for the entire text. It is likely that, on the left side of the wall, there were eight other columns which are now lost. This is not a real "code of laws," but rather, with the Latin, a satura legum, i.e., a sparse collection of laws, updates of previous ancient laws, and new laws focused on a specific topic. In the case of the Gortyn Code, the laws shown are mostly family law, as well as regarding economics and commerce.

=== Epigrafia Greca ===
Guarducci's long experience of teaching resulted in a work that is now a cornerstone in the teaching of Greek epigraphy: Epigrafia Greca, published between 1967 and 1978. The work is in four volumes, differing in content as follows:

- Caratteri e storia della disciplina. La scrittura greca dalle origini all'età imperiale (Character and history of the discipline. Greek writing from its origins to the imperial age) (1967)
- Epigrafi di carattere pubblico (Epigraphs of a public nature) (1969)
- Epigrafi di carattere privato (Epigraphs of a private nature) (1974)
- Epigrafi sacre, pagane e cristiane (Sacred inscriptions, pagan and Christian) (1978)

The work presents actual cases alongside theoretical explanations, providing the reader with a veritable "small anthology" of Greek inscriptions, with photographs, transcriptions, translations, commentary, and very often bibliographic references. Each volume includes a large bibliography. Because of a limited edition, the volumes of Epigrafia Greca were soon exhausted. Guarducci subsequently wrote a fifth volume to serve as a compendium for the previous four. It was published in 1987 as L'epigrafia greca dalle origini al tardo impero (Greek epigraphy from its origins to the late Empire).

=== Vatican Necropolis excavations ===
Guarducci was instrumental in the archaeological investigation of the Vatican Necropolis and subsequent identification of the bones of Saint Peter. Her training and expertise in epigraphy led her to decipher several inscriptions on the "Graffiti Wall" as pertaining to Peter and the location of his remains within the wall. Pope Paul VI publicly reported the Vatican's finding of the relics in June 1968, citing "archaeological and scientific conclusions" that resulted from Guarducci's investigation of the site and archival records. In defense of her work and analysis, Guarducci compiled The Tomb of St. Peter: The New Discoveries in the Sacred Grottoes of the Vatican, which was published in 1960.

In the later years of her life, Guarducci remained a passionate defender of her scientific work in the Necropolis and her identification of the remains. Some high-ranking Vatican officials, notably including clergyman and archaeologist Antonio Ferrua, publicly refuted the identification of the bones as those of Saint Peter. Ferrua had participated in the Vatican Necropolis before Guarducci's involvement, and he was removed from these efforts after Pope Pius XII appointed Guarducci head of the Necropolis excavations in 1953. Over nearly five decades following the 1968 papal announcement, Guarducci contributed to John Evangelist Walsh's 1983 book The Bones of St. Peter, while Ferrua's reportI-XVII and OSSA-U-GRAF was, and the question of the bones' identity was discussed in publications such as The Biblical Archaeologist. In 2013, Pope Francis publicly presented the bones identified by Guarducci as those of St. Peter, indicating Vatican acceptance of her analysis.

== Publications by Margherita Guarducci ==
- Inscriptiones creticae opera et consilio Friderici Halbherr collectae. Curavit Margarita Guarducci, 4 voll, Libreria dello Stato, 1935–1950
- I graffiti sotto la confessione di San Pietro in Vaticano, 3 voll., Libreria Editrice Vaticana, 1958
- La capsella eburnea di Samagher, Societa Istriana di archeologia e storia patria, 1978
- La cattedra di san Pietro nella scienza e nella fede, Ist. Poligrafico dello Stato, 1982
- La più antica icona di Maria. Un prodigioso vincolo fra Oriente e Occidente, Ist. Poligrafico dello Stato, 1989
- La tomba di san Pietro. Una straordinaria vicenda, Rusconi Ed., 1989
- San Pietro e sant'Ippolito: storia di statue famose in Vaticano, Ist. Poligrafico dello Stato, 1991
- Le chiavi sulla pietra. Studi, ricordi e documenti inediti intorno alla tomba di Pietro, Piemme, 1995
- Verità. Meditazioni, esperienze, documenti in tempi antichi e recenti, Ist. Poligrafico dello Stato, 1995
- Le reliquie di Pietro in Vaticano, Ist. Poligrafico dello Stato, 1995
- Epigrafia greca, 4 voll, Ist. Poligrafico dello Stato, 1995
- La tomba di san Pietro. Una straordinaria vicenda, Bompiani, 2000
- L'epigrafia greca dalle origini al tardo impero, Ist. Poligrafico dello Stato, 2005
- Fibula Prenestina. Tra antiquari, eruditi e falsari nella Roma dell'Ottocento, Bardi Editore 2007

== Sources ==
- Giovanna Bandini, Lettere dall'Egeo: archeologhe italiane tra 1900 e 1950, 2003.
- M. L. Lazzarini, Margherita Guarducci e Creta, Accademia Nazionale dei Lincei, 2005.
