= Giuseppe Gerola =

Italian historian

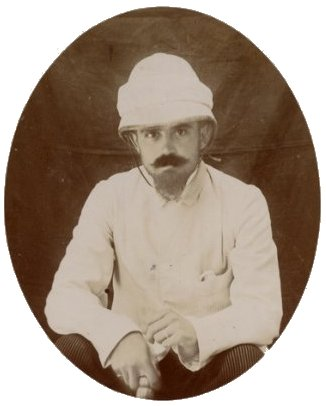
Giuseppe Gerola

Giuseppe Gerola (2 April 1877 - 21 September 1938) was an Italian historian known for his involvement in monument restoration projects, his studies on Venetian Crete and his investigation of political, cultural and artistic topics related to medieval Trentino.

== Childhood ==
Gerola was born in Arsiero to Domenico Gerola and Augusta Cofler. His family were unificationists originating from Rovereto. He spent his childhood in Lagarina Valley and completed his high school education in Desenzano.

== Education ==
During 1894-95, Gerola attended the Faculty of Arts in Padua and then moved to the Institute for Historical Studies of Florence where he graduated in 1898. His teachers included the palaeographer Cesare Paoli and the diplomat and historian Paul Scheffer-Boichorst (de) whose lectures he attended during a short stay at Berlin between 1898-99. He also spent some time in Freiburg, here he met the medievalist Heinrich Finke (de) and started developing his interest in art history and architecture.

Gerola was an energetic man with good organizational skills. Both of these virtues were put into good use during his endeavors in the study of paintings, sculpture, architecture or the management of restoration projects.

== Career ==
In 1899, at the suggestion of Federico Halbherr, the Venetian Institute of science, literature and the arts commissioned Gerola to carry out a field study in Crete with the aim to detect traces of the Venetian domination on the island which lasted from 1204 to 1669. During the two and a half years (early 1900 - July 1902) he stayed in Crete, Gerola collected a vast body of material, which he then edited over a period of almost thirty years (between 1905 and 1932). The result of this work was published in four monumental volumes, which earned him the 1933 Mussolini award conferred by the Royal Academy of Italy. These volumes are an invaluable source of information, saving from oblivion dozens of monuments that have been seriously damaged or even destroyed completely in recent years.

After returning to Italy, Gerola was appointed as the director of the Museum of Bassano del Grappa (1903–06) and then the Museum of Verona (1907–10). In 1909, he was promoted to Superintendent of the Monuments of Romagna based in Ravenna, a position he held until 1920. Gerola returned to Greece in 1912 for a field study in the Dodecanese islands (then under Italian control) and Rhodes in particular. In March 1920, he was appointed director of the regional office for the Monuments, Fine Arts and Antiques in Trento.

Gerola died in Trento in 1938.

== See also ==
- Photographic archive Gerola
