= Zanotelli =

Zanotelli is an Italian surname. Notable people with the surname include:

- Alex Zanotelli (born 1938), Italian missionary
- Davide Zanotelli (born 1988), Italian curler
- Silvio Zanotelli (born 1988), Italian curler
