= Alex Zanotelli =

Italian missionary

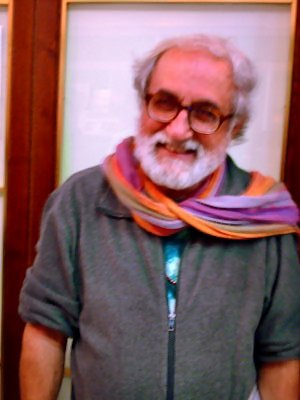
Father Alex Zanotelli

Father Alex Zanotelli (born August 26, 1938, Livo, Trentino) is an Italian Catholic priest of the Comboni Missionaries. He is the founder of several Italian movements whose goals include social harmony and equality.

== Biography ==
=== Early life ===
In the early 1960s, Zanotelli moved to Cincinnati, Ohio, to attend a course on theology while he was in high school. In 1964, after completing his theological studies in Cincinnati, he was ordained a priest.

=== Sudan and the Nuba ===
As a Combonian missionary, he left for South Sudan, which was plagued by civil war and where he stayed for eight years. The local government eventually pressured him to leave because of his open Christian witness and the active solidarity he showed the Nuba people. The reasons cited by the government included Zanotelli's inclusion of African traditional ceremonials in mass celebrations. Vatican authorities also objected to this practice, although Zanotelli received permission from local Catholic bishops. This annoyed both the local Sudanese authorities (which feared a dangerous mixture between a foreign religion and the local rites and ceremonies of a downcast people), and senior prelates in Rome who were finding it hard to accept the reforms brought on by the Second Vatican Council.

His sermons denounced injustices while exposing the responsibilities of corrupt government and administration officials who filled their pockets with both international and local aid funds.

=== Director of Nigrizia magazine in Verona ===
The house of the Combonians in Verona was a quiet place of gathering for most of the senior priests coming home from the mission fields, but it also hosted a printing company, publishing two different magazines: The little missionary and Nigrizia, a magazine providing news about the various missions around the world and was first published back in 1883. In 1978 Zanotelli became director of Nigrizia and worked to make it more of an information monthly, with the goal to be summed up in his statement: "To be at Africa's service, specifically the voice of those who have no voice" to radically criticize the political-economical system of the north of the world and the way it produces more and more misery in the south, destroying the most beautiful, significant, authentical African values."

Over the next decade, in his magazine Zanotelli took more specific stands on weapons dealing, on the cooperation for development having turned into an entangled business, on South African apartheid. All these matters had been taken on steadfastly and systematically, with the collaboration of the missionaries present on the different fields.

In 1987, some political and Vatican leaders urged him to leave the direction of Nigrizia. He was practically fired. At that time Zanotelli faced continuous attacks, but the goal was to undermine the growth and diffusion of the recently born movement he had inspired.

He denounced publicly the senior Italian political leadership of the time, including Giulio Andreotti, Giovanni Spadolini, Bettino Craxi and Flaminio Piccoli. He actually anticipated the Tangentopoli season. In January 1985 he published in the magazine an editorial titled "The Italian face of African famine", an open and cutting exposure of the system around Third World aid. He commented that Tangentopoli could be exposed then, they had all the clues. From African famine he passed on to the arms trade and environmental problems, and exposed what he regarded as the entanglement between the political class and business. Spadolini on the Espresso magazine, attacked heavily the so-called red priests, to the point of accusing him of incitement to political delinquency and international terrorism.

The period 1985-87 resulted in a hard time, with part of the Vatican hierarchy and of the "old missionaries" trying to bend him or expel him. Zanotelli described it as "a time of great personal suffering" which led him to a spiritual crisis and to doubting: "Am I really sure I told the truth? Can it be possible 50 million Italians are unable to see these scandals?" His cultural heritage has passed on to the following directors and editors of the magazine, and still keeps Nigrizia alive.

=== Korogocho, or Hell on earth ===
In the local language, the name Korogocho means confusion, chaos. Zanotelli stayed in Korogocho, one of the many shantytowns surrounding Nairobi (Kenya), until 2001. He founded many small Christian communities and a workers' cooperative for recycling, which employed many of the inhabitants of the shanties; he urged and helped in the Udada project, a community of former prostitutes involved in helping the women who wanted to change their life and at the same time he was working and struggling for the reforms about land distribution, one of the turning points in Kenyan politics.

In Korogocho human degradation was frightful and Zanotelli's assumption "Maybe God is sick" became the title of a book on Africa, written by Walter Veltroni, former secretary of the Italian DS party (Democratici di Sinistra, Democrats of the Left), former mayor of Rome and the only political leader (besides the American pastor and activist Jesse Jackson) who ever visited the place. In Korogocho God's sicknesses are named AIDS, hunger, prostitution, drugs, alcoholism, violence.

=== The Lilliput Net ===
During a sabbatical year Zanotelli spent in Italy in 1995-96, Zanotelli laid the foundation of the Lilliput Net project, inspired by the structure of the internet. The project is the result of meetings with Catholic associations, as well as inspiration from Jeremy Brecher and Tim Costello, as outlined in their book Global village or global pillage - Economic reconstruction from the bottom up.

In Italy, Zanotelli became a point of reference for the new global movement and the Lilliput Net. He took part in the organization and management of the European Social forum in Florence, 6-10 November 2002. This forum confirmed the supremacy of the non-violent policy of the movement on a relatively small minority which (after the violence exploded during the Genoa G8 meeting in July 2001) was tempted to stand for a more violent manifestation of dissent.

== Philosophy ==
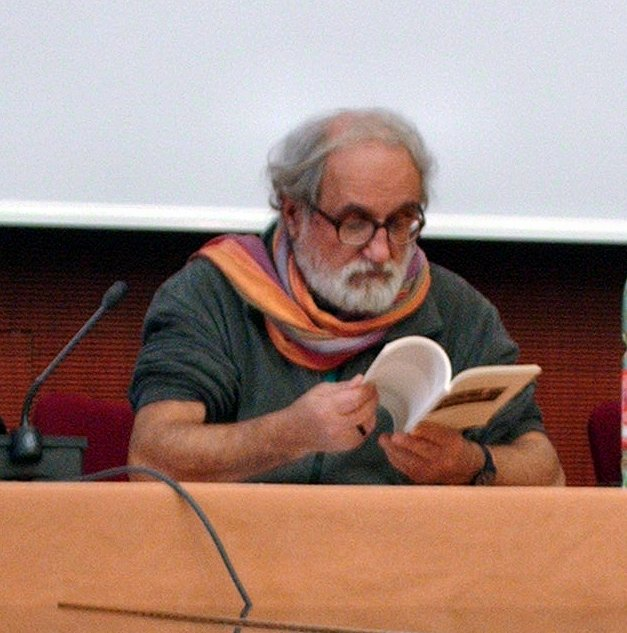
Alex Zanotelli attending a meeting during a book fair

=== God ===
In a short excerpt from his biography written by Mario Lancisi, Zanotelli answers a question about his ever doubting God's existence:

- “Yes, I did. Times and again. When you find yourself in such unbelievable situations, facing the suffering of innocents, just like it happened to me in Korogocho, the very first doubt is precisely about God' existence. Because you can't help but ask yourself: 'if You are there, how can You ever not intervene to put a stop to such atrocious suffering?' But, today, God is helpless, He is sick. He'll be able to recover when we will. We are the only ones who can and must do something about it, today. God can't. Not anymore. Each and everyone of us is important to help life come through...".
- Don't you think God is all mighty, then?
- “The more I think about it the more I realize that maybe God is not all powerful the way we believe Him to be. He is the God of the cross. Why didn't He answer the prayer of Jesus on the cross? It is a mystery. Maybe He is a weak God, Who sets limits to what He can do and will only be able to save us only through and by our will”.

=== Civilization of care ===
In Florence, Zanotelli spoke clearly to the extremist wings of the movement and expressed the concept of "civilization of tenderness": Active non-violence is not merely pacifism, it is something different. I started reading Gandhi, Martin Luther King, Don Milani, Mazzolari and they helped me to realize it had been Jesus of Nazareth who first practised non violence, the same non violence that was crushed by the Roman imperialism, in Galilee. I'd like to beg of you, with all my heart, to find the courage for such a radical choice: non-violence. The present system is naturally violent. We have to build a non violent system, a 'civilization of tenderness'."

== See also ==
- Streetwise priest
