= Ernst Fabricius =

German historian, archaeologist and scholar (1857–1942)

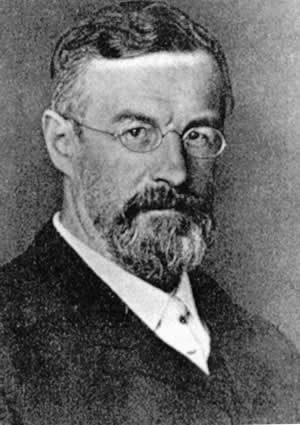
Ernst Fabricius

Ernst Christian Andreas Martin Fabricius (Darmstadt, 6 September 1857 – Freiburg im Breisgau, 22 March 1942) was a German historian, archaeologist and classical scholar. Between 1882 and 1888 he participated in excavations in Greece and Asia Minor and also pioneered German research on the Roman Empire border defenses known as the Limes Germanicus.

== Biography ==
Ernst Fabricius began his university studies in Strasbourg. In 1881 he received a doctorate in 'Comprehensive Greek Architecture' from the University of Bonn. His teachers included Adolf Michaelis, Rudolf Schöll, Heinrich Nissen and Hermann Usener. As a fellow of the German Archaeological Institute, along with geographer Heinrich Kiepert, he visited Italy, Greece and Asia Minor. In 1886, he was appointed professor of classical philology, archeology and ancient history at the University of Berlin. Subsequently, he participated in excavations in Greece and Asia Minor, specifically at Pergamon, Lesbos, Samos and Crete.

From 1888 until his retirement (1926) he was professor of ancient history at the Albert-Ludwigs-Universität in Freiburg, and the University of Freiburg in Breisgau.

At the University of Freiburg, Fabricius was the dean of the college, rector (1910–11), and Chairman of the Committee for the construction of the new universities. In 1902 he was appointed President of the German Limes Commission for the Committee on the Germanic-Rhaetian Limes.

During his career, Fabricius was extensively involved in politics. He served in the parliament of Baden (Badische Ständeversammlung) from 1913 to 1918.

He was a supporter of both German colonialism and Pangermanism. For many years he was a member of the People's League for Germans Abroad (Volksbund für das Deutschtum im Ausland) becoming president of the association in 1920.

Fabricius worked with Federico Halbherr on the Italian archaeological mission to Crete, and was a major contributor in the excavation and study of the Gortyn Code ("Leggi di Gortina") on civil rights.

== Publications ==
- Federico Halbherr, Ernst Fabricius e Domenico Comparetti, Leggi antiche della città di Gortyna in Creta. Firenze (Torino, Roma) : Loescher, 1885
- Der Limes vom Rhein bis zur Lahn. Nach den Untersuchungen der Streckenkommissare, Peters, Heidelberg 1915
- Über die Lex Mamilia Roscia Peducaea Alliena Fabia, Winter, Heidelberg 1924 (Sitzungsberichte der Heidelberger Akademie der Wissenschaften, Philosophisch-Historische Klasse, 1924/25, 1)
- as co-editor: Der obergermanisch-raetische Limes des Roemerreiches. Im Auftrag der Reichs-Limeskommission, Peters, Berlin-Leipzig, Heidelberg 1894–1938. – Reprint Greiner, Remshalden, 2005, ISBN 978-3-935383-61-5

== Bibliography ==
- Jürgen von Beckerath, Wilhelm Schleiermacher: Bibliographie Ernst Fabricius. In: Bericht der Römisch-Germanischen Kommission 32, 1942, pp. 229–236.
