= Photographic archive Gerola =

Photographic archive in Venice

Coordinates: 45.43277°N 12.32994°E

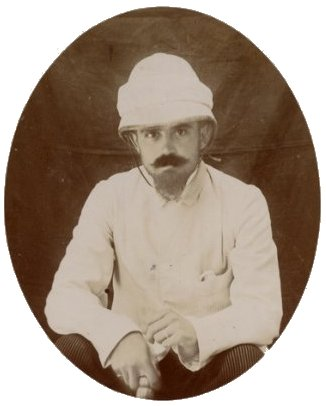
Giuseppe Gerola

Photographic archive Gerola is preserved by the Istituto Veneto di Scienze, Lettere ed Arti at Palazzo Loredan in Venice.

== Archive history ==
It is known that the European powers occupied Crete at the beginning of 1897, declaring its autonomy from the Ottoman Empire. In consideration of the ambiguous situation that had come about on the big Mediterranean island and the rapid deterioration of its historical monuments (threatened by theft and reckless demolitions), in 1898 the Italian Ministry of Education decided to send an archaeological mission to Crete, directed by Federico Halbherr. A member and future president of the Royal Istituto Veneto di Scienze, Lettere ed Arti, Carlo Francesco Ferraris, suggested to the members that they finance the sending of a delegate to Crete who could support the Italian mission with the specific task of exploring and illustrating the monuments that can still be found there of Venetian rule, which extended from 1204 to 1669.

In 1899 Giuseppe Gerola, on the recommendation of Halbherr (also originally from Rovereto), was appointed by the Istituto Veneto di Scienze, Lettere ed Arti to carry out a study campaign in Crete aimed at recording the monumental and artistic signs of Venetian rule there. The idea was to reproducing the numerous monuments of Venetian rule on the island partly with plaster casts and partly with photographs . Gerola arrived in Crete on 18 January 1900.

During two and a half years in Crete, (1900 - 1902), Gerola collected a vast quantity of material, then published over almost 30 years (between 1905 and 1932) in four monumental volumes, which in 1933 won him the Mussolini Prize, awarded by the Royal Academy of Italy.

== Documentation produced ==
Gerola wrote five reports for the Istituto, made more than 50 plaster casts (most of which are in storage at the Museo Storico Navale), took 1500 photographs, whose negatives are held at the Istituto Veneto, and made a large number of sketches, drawings and notes.

The collection consists of:

- 1642 photographic plates
- 1642 negatives
- 1642 photographic reproductions
- 1000 original photographs
- 291 flimsy papers
- 102 blotting papers
- 52 plaster casts

== Photographic gallery ==
Plaster casts

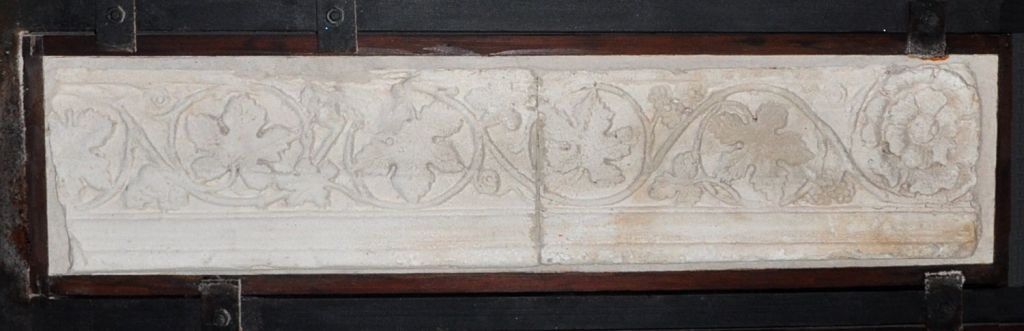
Plaster cast of architrave fragment. Irakleion, Crete.

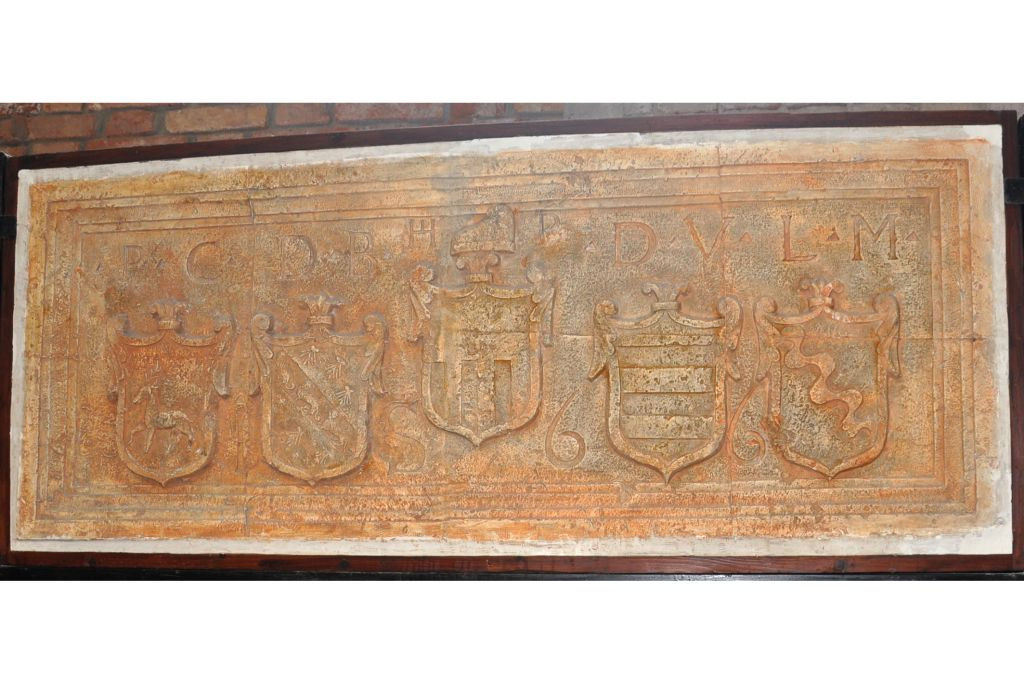
Plaster cast of Civran, Barbarigo, Priuli, Venier and Marcello coats of arms. Irakleion, Crete.

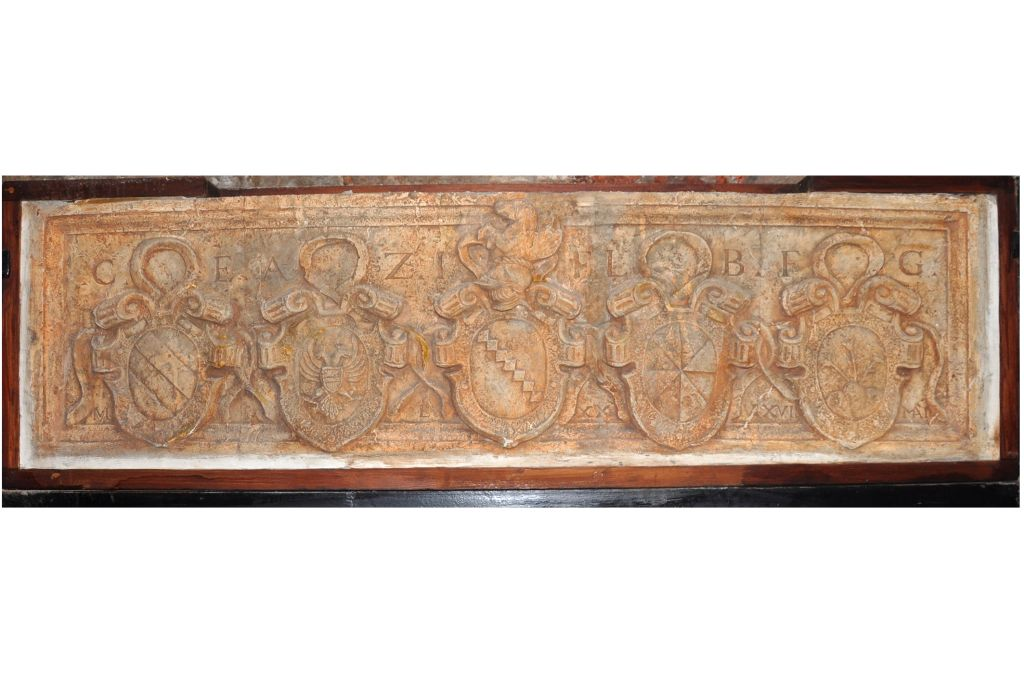
Plaster cast of Emo, Zustinian, Foscarini, Basadona and Garzoni coats of arms. Irakleion, Crete.

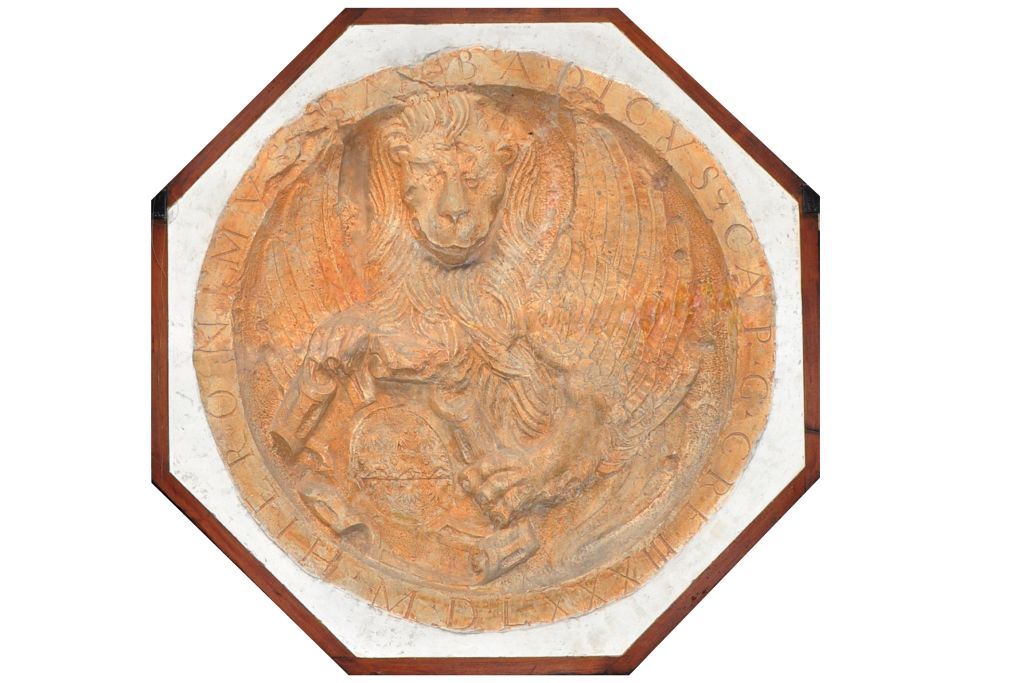
Plaster cast of lion holding the Barbarigo coat of arms. Irakleion, Crete.

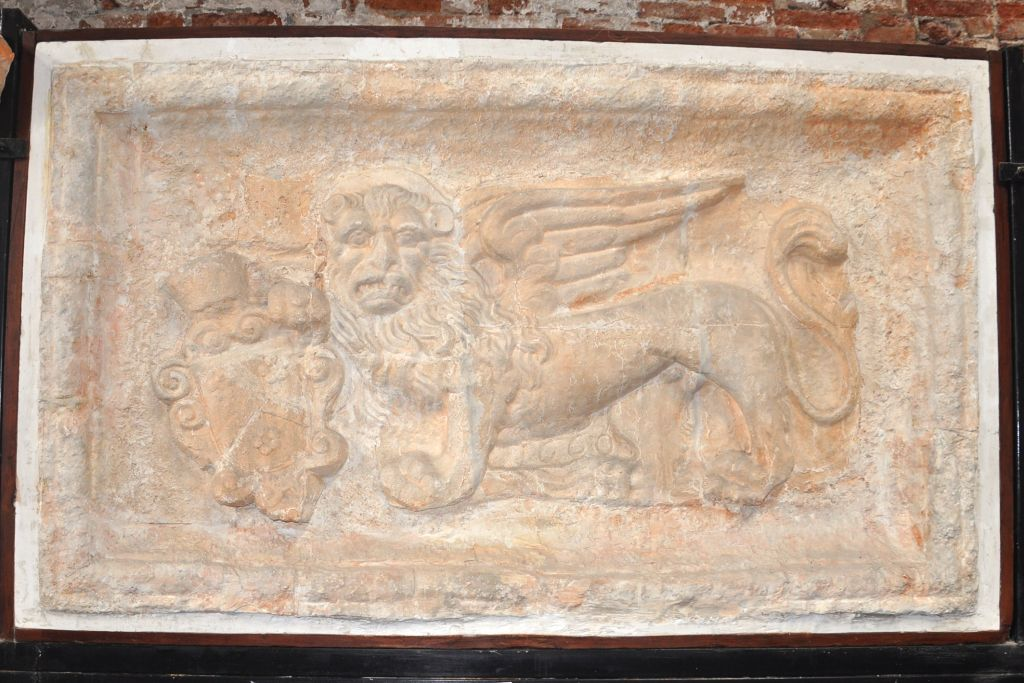
Plaster cast of lion holding the Bembo coat of arms. Irakleion, Crete.

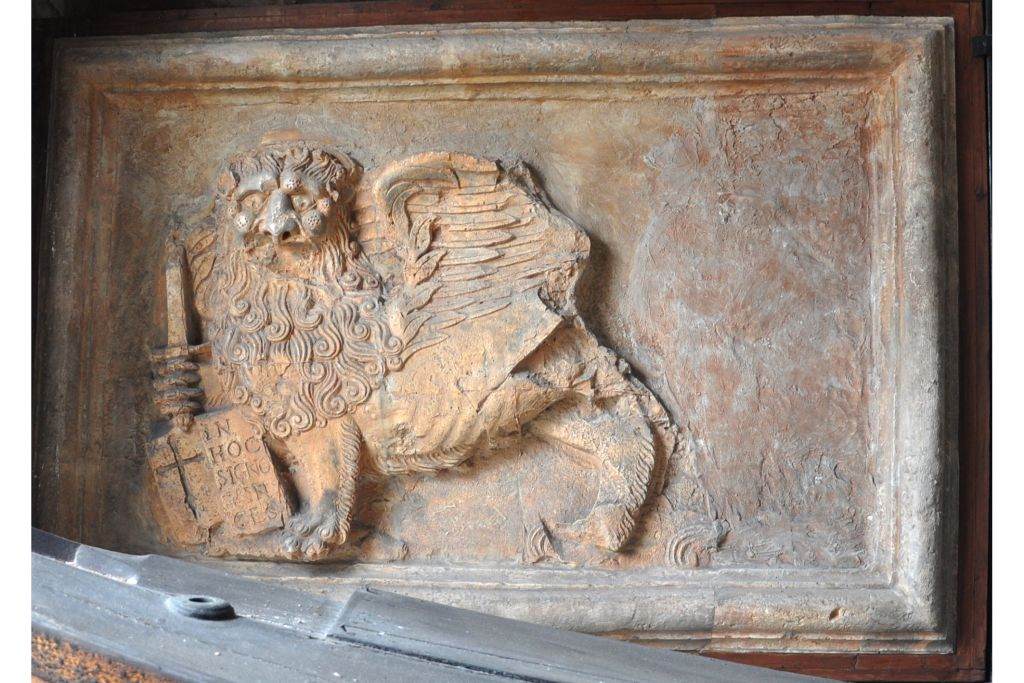
Plaster cast of lion above an inscription. Irakleion, Crete.

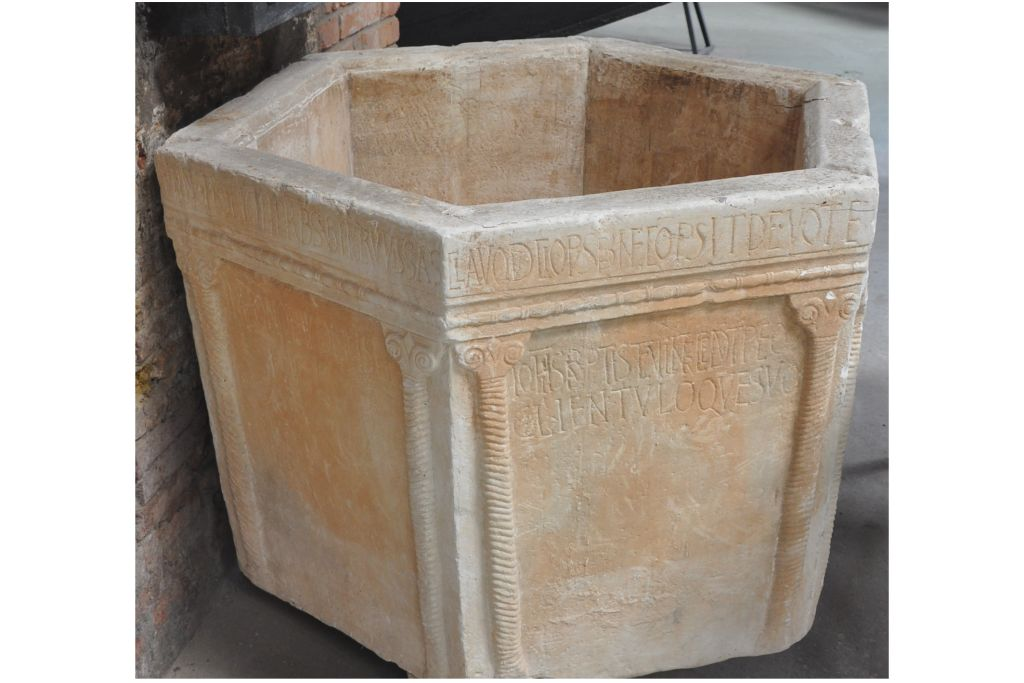
Plaster cast of well-curb with inscription and cross. Irakleion, Crete.

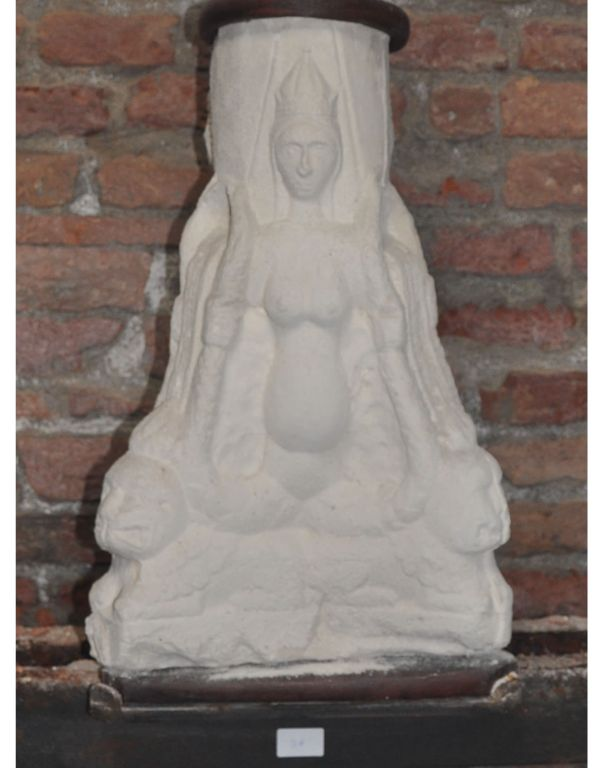
Plaster cast of plinth. Irakleion, Crete.
