= Guy Gilbert =

French Roman Catholic priest

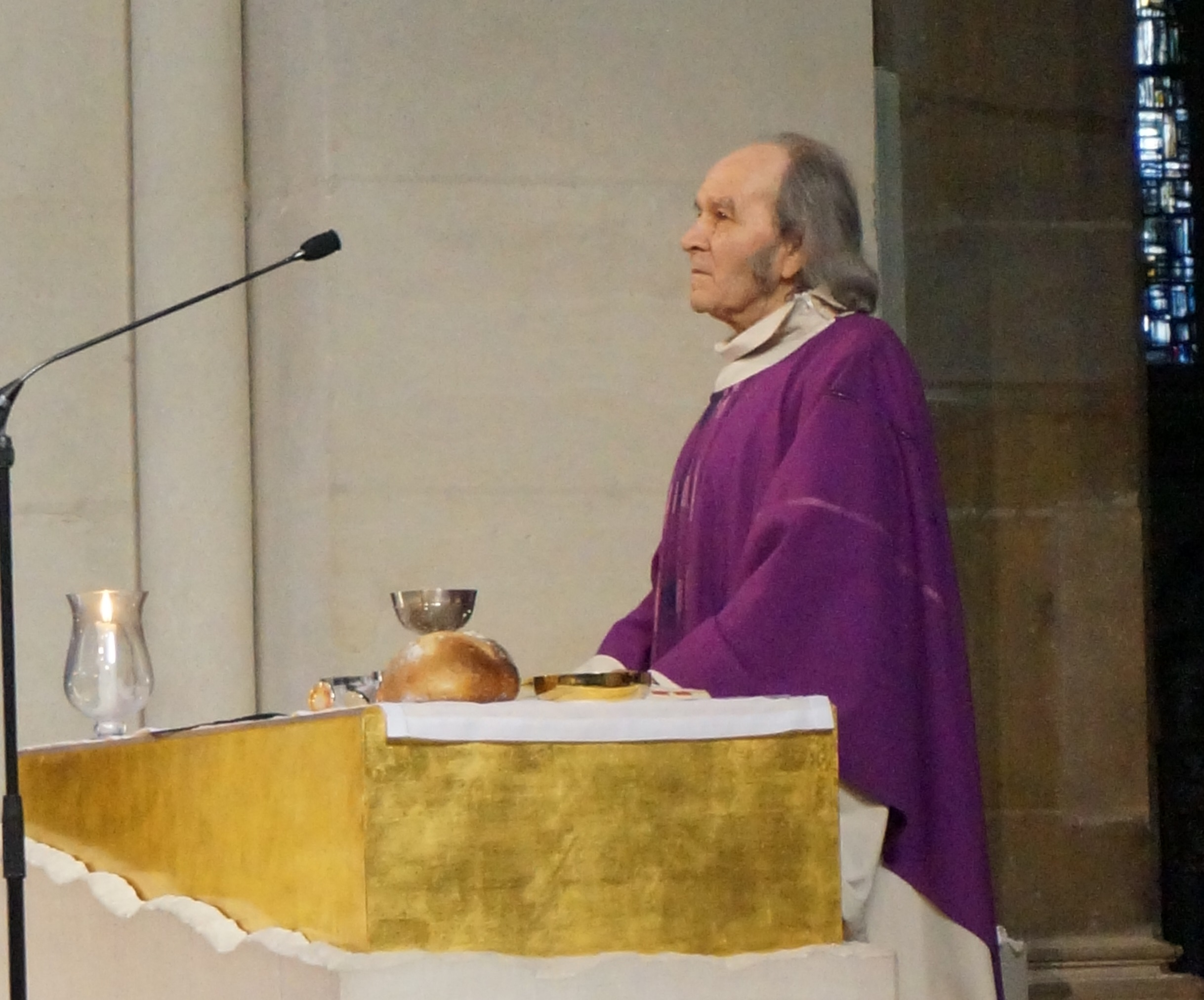
Guy Gilbert celebrating a Mass in 2015

Guy Gilbert (born 12 September 1935) is a French Catholic priest and educator.

== Biography ==
Born in Rochefort, Gilbert was educated at a seminary in Algeria and ministered in Algiers until 1970. He returned to France, to Paris, where he specialised in working with juvenile delinquents in the working-class 19th arrondissement where there was a sizable pied noir community. He purchased a farm in southern France, in Alpes-de-Haute-Provence, and established the Bergerie du Faucon centre where troubled youngsters might be reeducated and reintegrated into society through work, contact with animals and nature, and self-respect.

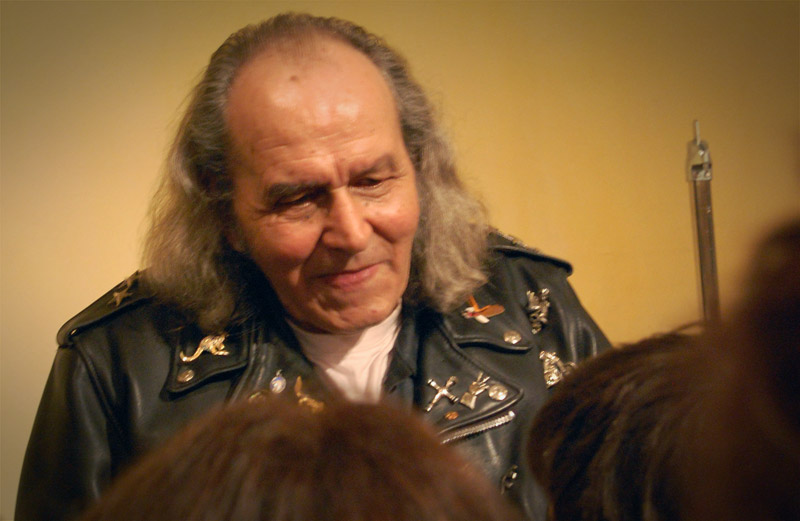
Father Gilbert dressed in civilian clothes

Guy Gilbert is thought to be a mentor of and a father figure for Prince Laurent of Belgium. In 2003, he married Laurent and Claire Coombs at the Cathedral of St. Michael and St. Gudula in Brussels. In 2011, he took part in the First Communion of their daughter Princess Louise.

A regular radio correspondent with Radio Notre-Dame, a frequent interviewee on television, a journalist with La Croix, and an author, Guy Gilbert is known for his atypical presentation; his long grey hair, his battered leather jacket, and his unorthodox language. Former President Jacques Chirac made him a chevalier of the Légion d'Honneur. He received the award from Abbé Pierre.

On 12 December 2015 Gilbert officiated the Catholic marriage between Belgian singer Paul Van Haver, known as Stromae, and his wife Coralie Barbier in Martin's Patershof, a former church in Mechelen.

== Select bibliography ==
- (in French) Un Prêtre chez les loubards, Stock, 1978
- (in French) La Rue est mon église, Stock, 1980
- (in French) Des Jeunes y entrent, des fauves en sortent, Stock, 1982
- (in French) L'Espérance aux mains nues, Stock, 1984
- (in French) Aventurier de l'amour, Stock, 1986
- (in French) Avec mon aube et mes santiags, Stock, 1988
- (in French) Les petits pas de l'amour, Stock, 1990
- (in French) Lutte, prie et aime, Éd. du Livre Ouvert, 1991
- (in French) Jusqu'au bout, Stock, 1993
- (in French) Dieu, mon premier Amour, Stock, 1995, ISBN 2-234-04466-9
- (in French) Des Loups dans la bergerie, Stock, 1996
- (in French) Dealer d'amour, Stock, 1997
- (in French) La Violence... un appel ?, Éd. du Livre Ouvert, 1998
- (in French) Chemin de croix, Éd. des Béatitudes, 1998
- (in French) Aimer à tout casser, Coccinelle BD, 1999
- (in French) Cris de jeunes, Salvator, 1999
- (in French) Le plus bel Album de famille : le rosaire, Éd. des Béatitudes, 2000
- (in French) Passeurs de l’impossible, Stock, 2000
- (in French) Ma Religion, c'est l'Amour, Stock, 2001
- (in French) L’Évangile selon saint Loubard, Éd. Philippe Rey, 2003 ISBN 978-2-84876-006-3.
- (in French) Peut-on changer ? , Éd. de l'atelier, 2004
- (in French) Kamikaze de l'espérance, Stock, 2005
- (in French) Les Mystères lumineux, Éd. des Béatitudes, 2005
- (in French) L'Évangile, une parole invincible, Éd. Philippe Rey, 2007 ISBN 978-2-84876-039-1.
- (in French) Des Loups à faucons, Coccinelle BD, 2006
- (in French) Et si je me confessais, Stock, 2006
- (in French) Rallumez le feu, Éd. Philippe Rey, 2007 ISBN 978-2-84876-101-5.
- (in French) Réussis ta vie ! , Éd. Philippe Rey, 2008
- (in French) Et si on parlait de tes mômes ? , Éd. Philippe Rey, 2008
- (in French) Mes plus belles Prières, Éd. Philippe Rey, 2008
- (in French) Ose l’amour !, Éd. Philippe Rey, 2009.
- (in French) Face à la violence : que pouvons nous faire, Éd. Philippe Rey, 2009
- (in French) Lutte et aime là où tu es !, Éd. Philippe Rey, 2009
- (in French) La Magie des animaux, Éd. Philippe Rey, 2010 ISBN 978-2-84876-163-3.
- (in French) Apprends à pardonner, Éd. Philippe Rey, 2010 ISBN 978-2-84876-162-6.
- (in French) Cœur de prêtre, cœur de feu, Éd. Philippe Rey, 2010
- (in French) La Vieillesse, un émerveillement, Éd. Philippe Rey, 2011
- (in French) Petit guide de prière, Éd. Philippe Rey, 2011 ISBN 978-2-84876-186-2.
- (in French) Éveilleur d'espérance (photos), Éd. Philippe Rey, 2011 ISBN 978-2-84876-197-8.
- (in French) Occupe-toi des autres !, Éd. Philippe Rey, 2012 ISBN 978-2-84876-211-1.
- (in French) Le Couple, Éd. Philippe Rey, 2012 ISBN 978-2-84876-206-7.
- (in French) Vagabond de la bonne nouvelle, Éd. Philippe Rey, 2012 ISBN 978-2-84876-226-5.
- (in French) Nos Fragilités, Éd. Philippe Rey, 2013 ISBN 978-2-84876-302-6.
- (in French) Le Bonheur, Éd. Philippe Rey, 2013 ISBN 978-2-84876-300-2.
- (in French) Jésus, un regard d'amour, Éd. Philippe Rey, 2013 ISBN 978-2-84876-366-8.
- (in French) La Nuit s'approche, l'aube va arriver, Éd. Philippe Rey, 2014 ISBN 978-2-84876-403-0.
- (in French) L'Humilité, Éd. Philippe Rey, 2014 ISBN 978-2-84876-405-4.
- (in French) La Nuit s'approche, l'aube va arriver, Éd. Philippe Rey, 96 pages, 2014. ISBN 978-2-84876-403-0.
- (in French) Aime à tout casser !, Éd. Philippe Rey, 2014 ISBN 978-2-84876-433-7.
- (in French) Les sept Sacrements, Éd. Philippe Rey, 2015 ISBN 978-2-84876-461-0.
- (in French) Prends le temps de vivre, Éd. Philippe Rey, 2015 ISBN 978-2-84876-459-7.
- (in French) Vie de combat, vie d'amour, Éd. Philippe Rey, 2015 ISBN 978-2-84876-487-0.
- (in French) La Foi, Éd. Philippe Rey, 2016
- (in French) La Famille, trésor de notre temps, Éd. Philippe Rey, 2016 ISBN 978-2-84876-533-4.
- (in French) En Cœur à cœur avec Dieu, Éd. Philippe Rey, 2016 ISBN 9782848765624.
- (in French) Les Sourires de Dieu, Éd. Philippe Rey, 2017. ISBN 978-2-84876-599-0.
- (in French) La Messe, un enchantement déserté, Éd. Philippe Rey, 96 pages, 2017. ISBN 978-2-84876-597-6.

== See also ==
- Streetwise priest
