= Streetwise priest =

Roman Catholic priest operating in contact with the "street"

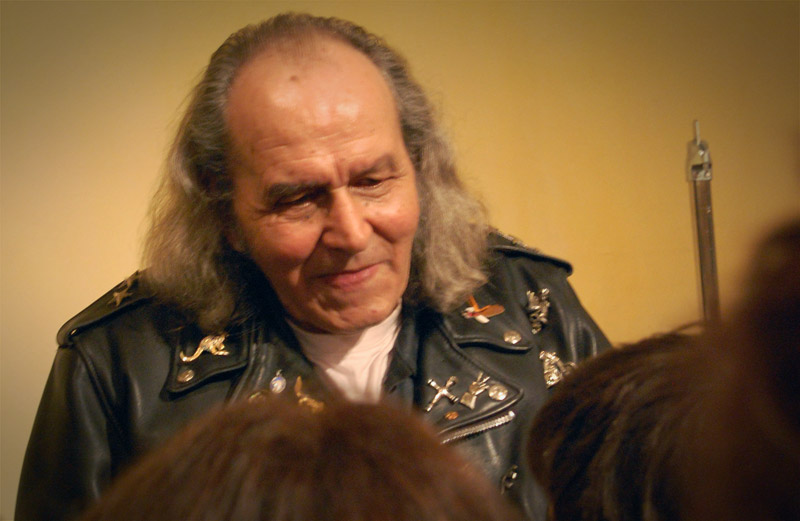
Guy Gilbert

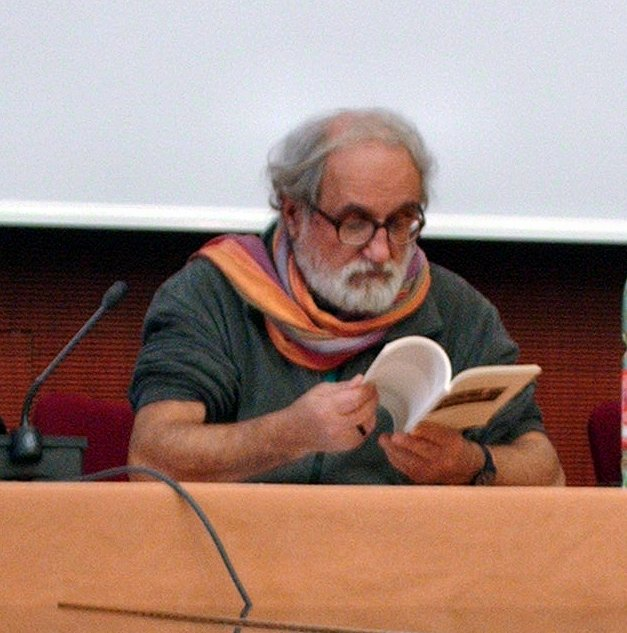
Alex Zanotelli

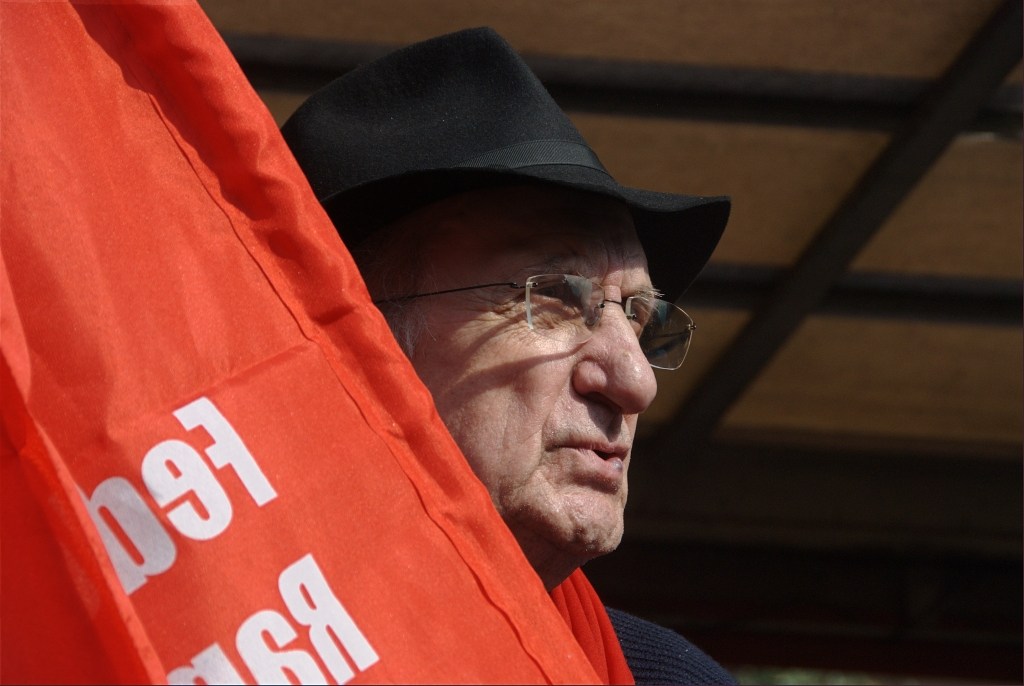
Andrea Gallo

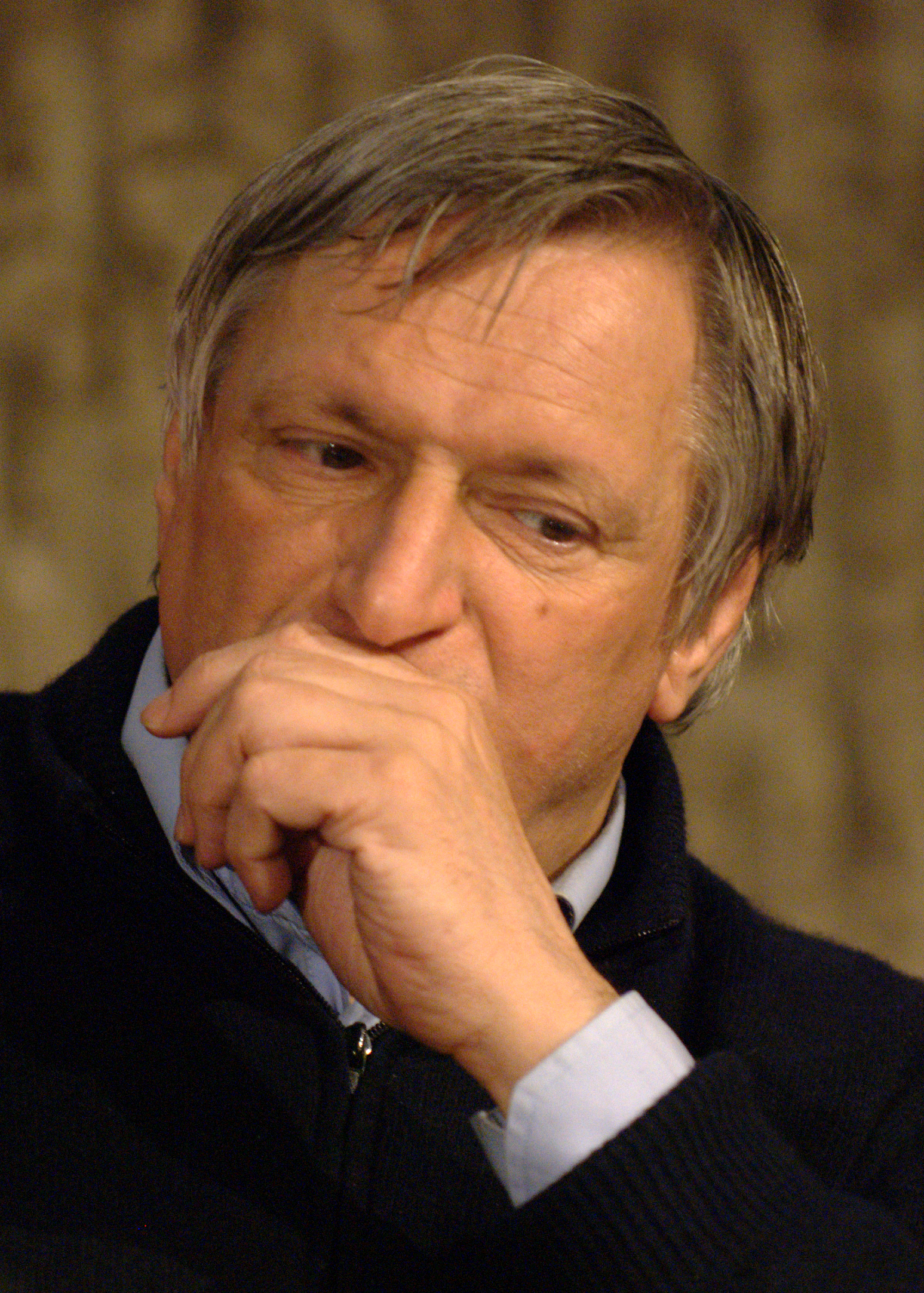
Luigi Ciotti

Streetwise priests (Italian: preti di strada; Spanish: curas de la calle; French: prêtres de rue; German: Priester der Straße) are Catholic priests who exercise their spiritual mandate by living in structures in direct contact with the "street", which is their mission land. Historical streetwise priests include Philip Neri (1515–1595) and John Bosco (1815–1888).

Recently, the expression came to denote priests with reformist ideas, especially those involved in reform movements for social justice in a Christian context through service to the poor and marginalized. Their work covers various areas, such as education, marginalization, imprisonment, development cooperation, drug addictions, disabilities, orphans and abandoned children, prostitution, and homelessness.

In many cases, streetwise priests form groups, associations, or communities, especially inclusive of laity. Through 2008, debates and conflicts with ecclesiastical hierarchy existed regarding Catholic social teaching and implementing the Second Vatican Council's doctrine.

== Notable streetwise priests ==
Below is a list of priests who have been described as streetwise.

=== Central America ===
- Oscar Romero, El Salvador
- Padre Gadalupe, James Carney, American missionary murdered in Honduras 1983
- Juan José Gerardi Conedera, Guatemala

=== South America ===
- Padre Cacho, Uruguay
- Don Gonzalo Aemilius, Uruguay
- Monsignor Hélder Câmara, Bishop
- Don Júlio Lancellotti, Brazil

=== North America ===
- Larry Rosebaugh, O.M.I.
- Greg Boyle
- Michael Pfleger

=== France ===
- Abbé Pierre (1912–2007)
- Father Guy Gilbert (b. 1935)

=== Italy ===
- Monsignor Tonino Bello (1935–1993), Bishop
- Don Oreste Benzi (1925–2007), Comunità Papa Giovanni XXIII
- Don Luigi Ciotti (b. 1945), Gruppo Abele and Libera
- Don Peppino Diana (1958–1994), priest against the Camorra
- Don Andrea Gallo (1928–2013), Comunità di San Benedetto al Porto
- Don Lorenzo Milani (1923–1967), Scuola di Barbiana
- Don Pino Puglisi (1937–1993), victim of the Sicilian Mafia
- Father Alex Zanotelli

=== Ireland ===
- Fr Peter McVerry, SJ (b. 1944)

== See also ==
- Worker-priest

== Bibliography ==
- Roberto Beretta e Giovanni Gazzaneo, Preti di strada: le frontiere dell'emarginazione e della speranza raccontate dai più noti sacerdoti anti-droga, con prefazione di Furio Colombo, SEI, Torino, 1995
- Candido Cannavò, Pretacci: storie di uomini che portano il Vangelo sul marciapiede, Rizzoli, Milano, 2008
- Mimmo Battaglia e Virginio Colmegna, I poveri hanno sempre ragione: storie di preti di strada, Cittadella editrice, Assisi, 2010
- Pierfilippo Pozzi (cur.), Dov'è Dio: il Vangelo quotidiano secondo quattro preti di strada, Einaudi, Torino, 2011
