= Elena Raffalovich =

Russian educator

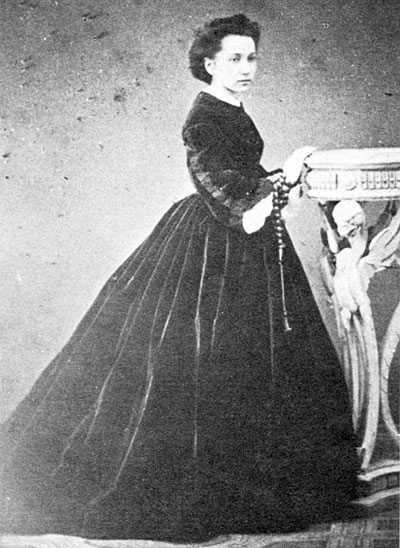
Elena Raffalovich

Elena Raffalovich (1842-1918) was a Russian educator. A noted figure within the pioneers of the Kindergarten, she was foremost active in Italy.

== Biography ==
Elena Raffalovich was born on 22 May 1842 in Odessa. She was the third daughter of Leon and Rosette Lowensohn; her sisters were Marie and Nadine. In 1861, her family settled in Western Europe.

In 1872, Raffalovich went to Florence, where she met Bertha von Marenholtz-Bülow. Marenholtz-Bülow was an adherent of Froebelism and introduced the philosophy to Raffalovich. Raffalovich attempted to found a kindergarten in Florence, to limited success. In 1873, Raffalovich founded the first Froebelian kindergarten in Venice.

Raffalovich died on 29 November 1918.

=== Family ===
She married the scholar Domenico Comparetti on 13 August 1863. They had one daughter, Laura. Raffalovich and Comparetti separated in January 1872, possibly after she attempted suicide.

She was the paternal great-grandmother of Lorenzo Milani.
