= Mazzolari =

Mazzolari is an Italian surname. Notable people with the surname include:

- Cesare Mazzolari (1937–2011), Italian Roman Catholic bishop
- Primo Mazzolari (1890–1959), Italian Roman Catholic priest
