= Domenico Comparetti =

Italian scholar (1835–1927)

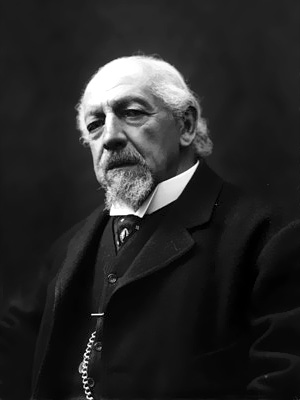
- Domenico Comparetti picture
- Born: 27 June 1835; Rome
- Died: 20 January 1927 (aged 91); Florence

Academic background
- Education: University of Rome

Domenico Comparetti (27 June 1835 – 20 January 1927) was an Italian scholar. He was born in Rome and died in Florence.

== Life ==
He studied at the University of Rome La Sapienza, took his degree in 1855 in natural science and mathematics, and entered his uncle's pharmacy as an assistant. His scanty leisure was, however, given to study. He learned Greek by himself, and gained facility in the modern language by conversing with the Greek students at the university. In spite of all disadvantages, he not only mastered the language but became one of the chief classical scholars of Italy.

In 1857 he published, in the Rheinisches Museum, a translation of some recently discovered fragments of Hypereides, with a dissertation on that orator. This was followed by a notice of the annalist Granius Licinianus, and one on the oration of Hypereides on the Lamian War. In 1859 he was appointed professor of Greek at Pisa on the recommendation of the duke of Sermoneta. A few years later he was called to a similar post at Florence, remaining emeritus professor at Pisa also. He subsequently took up his residence in Rome as lecturer on Greek antiquities and greatly interested himself in the Roman Forum excavations. He was a member of the governing bodies of the academies of Milan, Venice, Naples and Turin. He was appointed senator in 1891.

In Pisa, in 1863, he met Leone Raffalovich, a businessman from Odessa. After a short engagement, he married Leone's daughter Elena on 13 August, and in 1865 their daughter Laura was born. Their different natures meant that the couple drifted apart, and in 1872 Elena left the family to settle in Venice. Laura married Luigi Adriano Milani, and Domenico Comparetti, wishing that their last name should be transmitted to her daughter's male descendants, got the royal concession to the addition of his name to those of the Milani grandchildren. His great-grandson was Don Lorenzo Milani.

== Works ==
The list of Comparetti's writings is long and varied. Of his works in classical literature, the best known are an edition of the Euxenippus of Hypereides, and monographs on Pindar and Sappho. He also edited the great inscription which contains a collection of the municipal laws of Gortyn in Crete, discovered on the site of the ancient city.

In the Kalewala and the Traditional Poetry of the Finns (English translation by I. M. Anderton, 1898) he discusses the national epic of Finland and its heroic songs, with a view to solving the problem whether an epic could be composed by the interweaving of such national songs. He comes to a negative conclusion, and applies this reasoning to the Homeric problem. He treats this question again in a treatise on the so-called Peisistratean edition of Homer (La Commissione omerica di Pisistrato, 1881).

His Researches concerning the Book of Sindibad were translated in the Proceedings of the Folk-Lore Society. His Vergil in the Middle Ages (translated into English by E. F. M. Benecke, 1895) traces the strange vicissitudes by which the great Augustan poet became successively grammatical fetich, Christian prophet and wizard. Together with Alessandro d'Ancona, Comparetti edited a collection of Italian national songs and stories (9 vols, Turin, 1870–1891), many of which had been collected and written down by himself for the first time.

In 1879, a number of small golden tablets were discovered in tombs in Thurii. Several years later, Comparetti asserted that these lamellae were Orphic, interpreting lines upon these and other such tablets as attestation of "the main principles or the Orphic doctrine on psychogony and metempsychosis". In these artefacts, he read traces of the myth of the dismemberment of Dionysus, in which humans supposedly inherit an "original guilt" for the Titans' murder of the young god. His ideas were adopted by a number of other scholars in his time, and have had a mark upon subsequent scholarship.
