= Federico Halbherr =

Italian archaeologist and epigrapher (1857–1930)

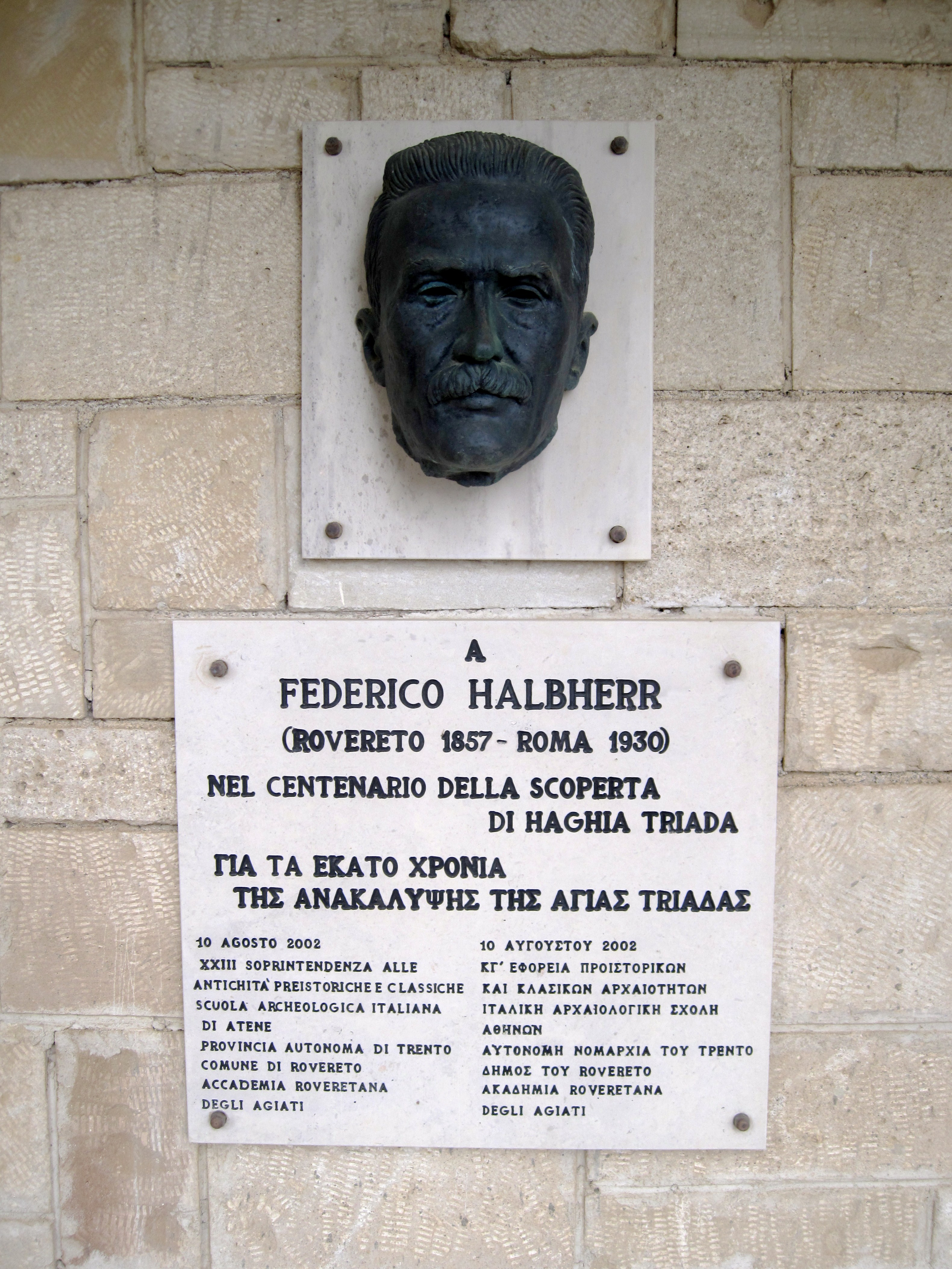
- Memorial to Halbherr at Hagia Triada
- Born: 15 February 1857; Rovereto, Austrian Empire
- Died: 17 July 1930 (aged 73); Rome, Italy
- Known for: Excavation of Phaistos, Hagia Triada, discovery of the Gortyn code, foundation of the Italian School of Archaeology at Athens
- Scientific career
- Fields: Archaeology

Archaeological map of Crete

Federico Halbherr (15 February 1857 – 17 July 1930) was an Italian archaeologist and epigrapher, known for his excavations on Crete. In particular, he is known for his excavations of the Minoan palace at Phaistos and the Minoan town of Hagia Triada. A contemporary, friend, and advisor of Arthur Evans, he began excavating at Phaistos before Evans began excavating at Knossos. Some of his work was funded by the Archaeological Institute of America.

== Biography ==
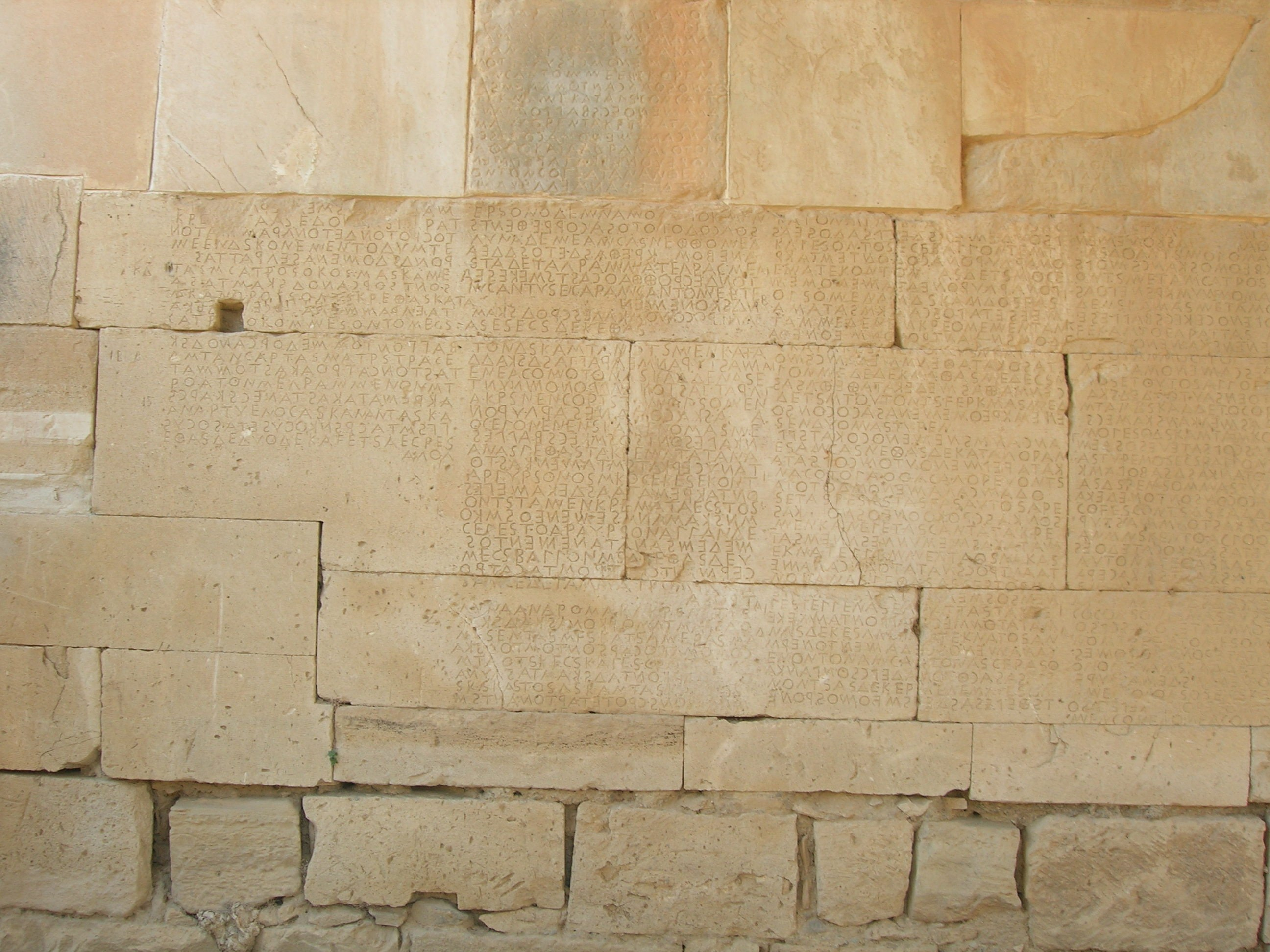
Inscription with the laws of Gortina

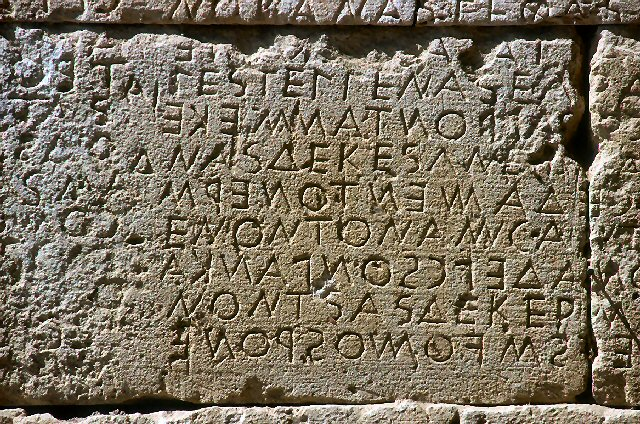
Block inscribed with the laws of Gortina

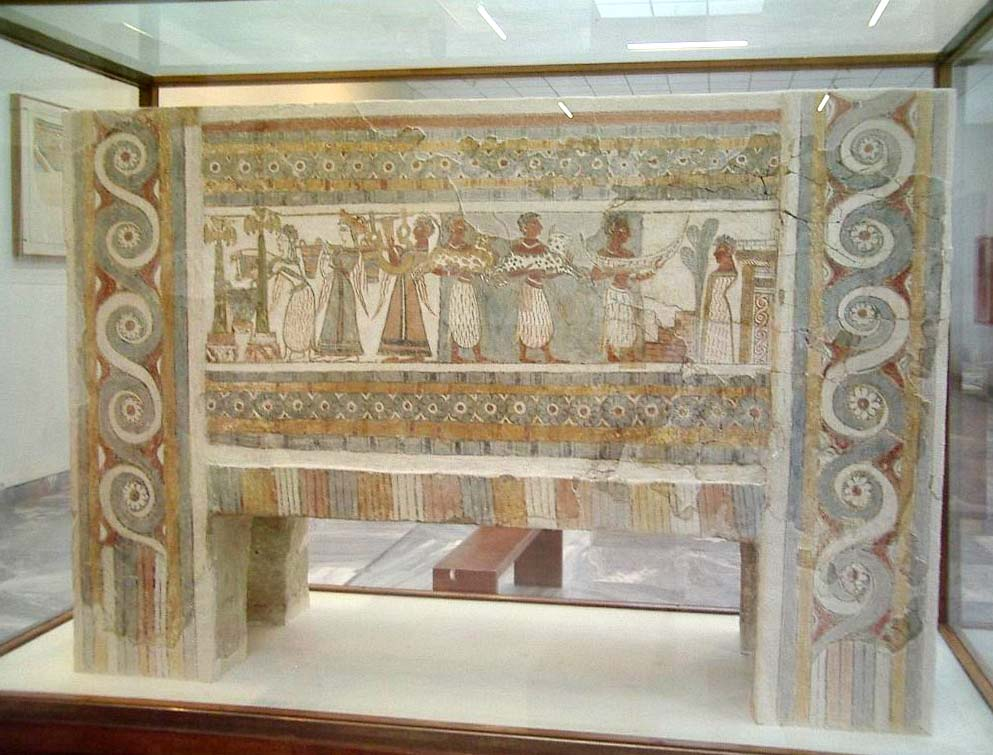
Sarcophagus of Hagia Triadha

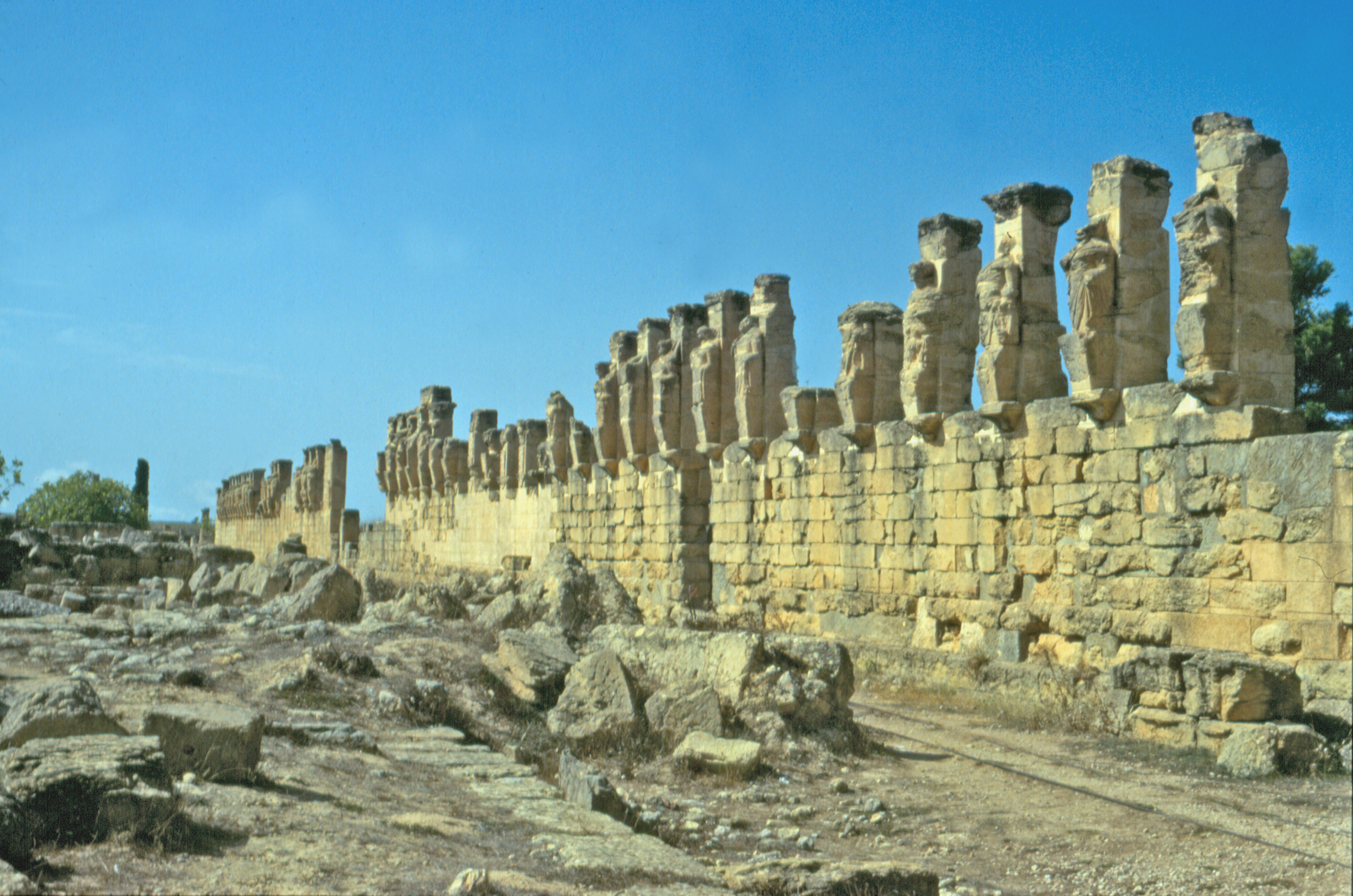
Cyrene

=== Family background ===
Federico (English Frederick) Halbherr was born into a prosperous family in Rovereto, then part of Austria, in the district of Trentino. The distant ancestors of the name were a Swiss family, goldsmiths by occupation, who had arrived in Trentino centuries ago, during its long period of being an independent kingdom. Federico was the son of Giovanni Battista (English "John the Baptist") Halbherr and his second wife, Rosa (Fontana) Halbherr. Federico had an older half-brother, Bernardino, whose mother, Marietta (Giongo) Halbherr, had died of complications a few days after his birth.

=== Education ===
Federico attended the local schools in Rovereto for his primary and secondary education. He was known as being very bright, earning a "first class with eminence" in high school. First studying in Vienna with his friend and contemporary Paolo Orsi, he then moved to the University of Rome to become a student of Domenico Comparetti.

=== Career as an archaeologist and educator ===
He carried out important excavations at Phaistos, Gortyn and Hagia Triada, whose results he presented in several publications. In 1910 he was the founder and first director of the Italian Archaeological Mission to Crete (what later became known as the Italian Archaeological School of Athens). His most important Greek discovery was the major inscription in the Greek Doric script of the late 6th and early 5th centuries BC containing the Gortyn code on family law, which was found in the 1884-87 excavations at Gortyn – a cast of it is on display in the Sala Dutuit of the Accademia Nazionale dei Lincei's base at Palazzo Corsini alla Lungara (Halbherr was an associate of the academy). He was also among the pioneers of archaeological studies of Cyrene.

In his later years Halbherr became professor of ancient Greek epigraphy in 1889. Students under him included, among others, Gaetano de Sanctis, Luigi Pernier and above all Margherita Guarducci, who completed and edited Halbherr's work on his death.

For all the time that he explored and excavated in Crete, and was accepted as a valued friend by the British and Americans, Halbherr was, strictly speaking, not Italian, but Austrian. His native city, Rovereto, was on the Austrian side of the border in what is now northern Italy. Halbherr's first education beyond secondary school was in Vienna. At heart, however, he was an Italian. He soon went to Italy to study with Domenico Comparetti. It was under the latter's auspices that he first excavated in Crete, to become known as an Italian archaeologist. He shared his deepest interests and also his politics with the English-speaking nationals. They were all against the Ottoman Empire.

His activities in Crete and his acceptance by the English-speakers came to a rather abrupt end in 1911 through no intent and no fault of his own. The Italian government developed imperial designs on Ottoman Tripolitania, in those times ten years before the rise of Italian fascism. The Italo-Turkish War was to deliver Libya to Italian rule in 1913 by the Treaty of Ouchy, but meanwhile, in 1911, not long before the arrival of Italian troops, Halbherr turned up in Libya.

An American expedition from the University of Michigan under Richard Norton, Director of the Archaeological Institute of America, began excavating at Cyrene in 1910. In July and August Halbherr and di Sanctis arrived to conduct a survey, ostensibly of archaeological sites, but perhaps with other motives. They were back in late 1911 a few months ahead of Italian troops, but the Americans did not know that. Shortly Herbert Fletcher De Cou, an archaeologist, was shot to death from ambush, ostensibly for being too forward with a married Arab woman. The Americans blamed Halbherr. Neither he nor De Cou were in character with the supposed motives. The Americans departed. Italian troops invaded. Halbherr used them to excavate Cyrene. He was no longer trusted in the English-speaking world. He was responsible for extending the Italian law that no foreigner could excavate in Italy to Libya.

Federico's native city was on the left flank of the front line in the Battle of Vittorio Veneto, 1918. The Italians overran the entire area. Austrian military capability was in essence destroyed. Rovereto was awarded to Italy by the 1919 Treaty of Saint-Germain-en-Laye. Halbherr took no part in the war. By 1928, most of the Italian archaeologists were ardent fascists. Part of the platform was to restore Roman possessions to Italy, which appealed to the antiquarians. Halbherr served on a committee under Dino Grandi to oversee Italian archaeology. A monument to him stands at Hagia Triada.

== Works in Italian ==
=== Writings by Halbherr alone and with others ===
- Federico Halbherr, Ernst Fabricius, & Domenico Comparetti, Leggi antiche della città di Gortyna in Creta. Firenze (Torino, Roma) : Loescher, 1885
- Federico Halbherr & Domenico Comparetti, Relazione sui nuovi scavi eseguiti a Gortyna presso il Letheo; Iscrizioni arcaiche rinvenute nei medesimi; Iscrizioni di varie citta cretesi. Firenze : Tip. Bencini, 1887
- Federico Halbherr & Paolo Orsi, Antichità dell'antro di Zeus Ideo e di altre località in Creta, descritte ed illustrate da F. Halbherr e P. Orsi. Firenze (Torino, Roma) : Loescher, 1888
- Federico Halbherr, Lavori eseguiti in Creta dalla missione archeologica italiana dal 9 giugno al 9 novembre 1899. Roma : Tipografia della Reale Accademia dei Lincei, 1899
- Federico Halbherr, Relazione sugli scavi del tempio d'Apollo Pythio in Gortyna e nuovi frammenti d'iscrizioni arcaiche trovati nel medesimo. Roma : Tipografia della Reale Accademia dei Lincei, 1889
- Federico Halbherr, Lavori eseguiti dalla missione archeologica italiana ad Haghia Triada e nella necropoli di Phaestos dal 15 maggio al 12 giugno 1902. Roma : Tipografia della Reale Accademia dei Lincei, 1902
- Federico Halbherr, Rapporto alla presidenza del R. Istituto lombardo di scienze e lettere sugli scavi eseguiti dalla missione archeologica ad Haghia Triada ed a Festo nell'anno 1904. Milano : Ulrico Hoepli edit., 1905
- Federico Halbherr, Lavori eseguiti dalla missione archeologica italiana in Creta dal 15 dicembre 1903 al 15 agosto 1905 : relazione del prof. Federico Halbherr a Luigi Pigorini. Roma : Tipografia della Reale Accademia dei Lincei, 1906
- Federico Halbherr & Luigi Savignoni, Resti dell'eta micena scoperti ad Haghia Triada presso Phaestos : rapporto delle ricerche del 1902. Roma : Tipografia della Reale Accademia dei Lincei, 1903

=== Writings edited by Margherita Guarducci ===
- Federico Halbherr & Margherita Guarducci, Inscriptiones Creticae opera et consilio Friderici Halbherr collectae. 1., Tituli Cretae mediae praeter Gortynios; 2., Tituli Cretae occidentalis / curavit Margarita Guarducci. Roma : Istituto Poligrafico dello Stato, Libreria, 1935, 1939
- Federico Halbherr & Margherita Guarducci, Inscriptiones creticae opera et consilio Friderici Halbherr collectae. 3., Tituli Cretae orientalis, curavit Margarita Guarducci. Roma : Istituto Poligrafico dello Stato, Libreria, 1942
- Federico Halbherr & Margherita Guarducci, Inscriptiones Creticae opera et consilio Friderici Halbherr collectae. 4., Tituli Gortynii, curavit Margarita Guarducci. Roma : Istituto Poligrafico dello Stato, Libreria, 1950
- Federico Halbherr & Margherita Guarducci, Inscriptiones Creticae,(I: Tituli cretae mediae praeter Gortynios; II Tituli Cretae occidentalis; III Tituli Cretae orientalis; IV Tituli Gortynii, opera et consilio Friderici Halbherr collectae; curavit Margarita Guarducci. Roma : Istituto Poligrafico dello Stato, Libreria, 1935-1950

=== Letters ===
- Silvio Accame (ed.), Federico Halbherr e Gaetano De Sanctis pionieri delle missioni archeologiche italiane a Creta e in Cirenaica : dal carteggio De Sanctis 1909-1913. Roma : La Roccia, 1984
- Silvio Accame (ed.), Federico Halbherr e Gaetano De Sanctis : nuove lettere dal carteggio De Sanctis 1892-1932. Roma : Don Bosco, 1986

=== Writings about Halbherr in Italian ===
- Margherita Guarducci, Ricordo di Federico Halbherr nel centenario della nascita, 1857-1957. Presentazione di U. Tomazzoni. Rovereto : a cura dell'Ente comunale di assistenza di Rovereto (Tipografia R. Manfrini), 1958
- Marta Petricioli, Elena Sorge, Vincenzo La Rosa, Inventario delle carte di Federico Halbherr di proprietà dell'Accademia roveretana degli Agiati. Rovereto : Accademia roveretana degli Agiati, 1994
- AAVV, La figura e l'opera di Federico Halbherr: atti del convegno di studio svoltosi nei giorni 26-27 maggio 2000, Sala Mozart di Palazzo Todeschi, Rovereto. Padova, Aldo Ausilio Editore, 2000.
- Stefano Struffolino, Federico Halbherr. Rovereto, Creta, la Libia. Roma, Gangemi editore, 2024

== Bibliography ==
- Begg, DJ Ian (2004), "Fascism in the Desert: a Microcosmic View of Archaeological Politics", in Galatz, Michael L; Watkinson, Charles (eds.), Archaeology Under Dictatorship, New York; al.: Kluwer Academic / Plenum Publishing, pp. 19–32
