= Lorenzo Milani =

Italian Catholic priest and educator (1923–1967)

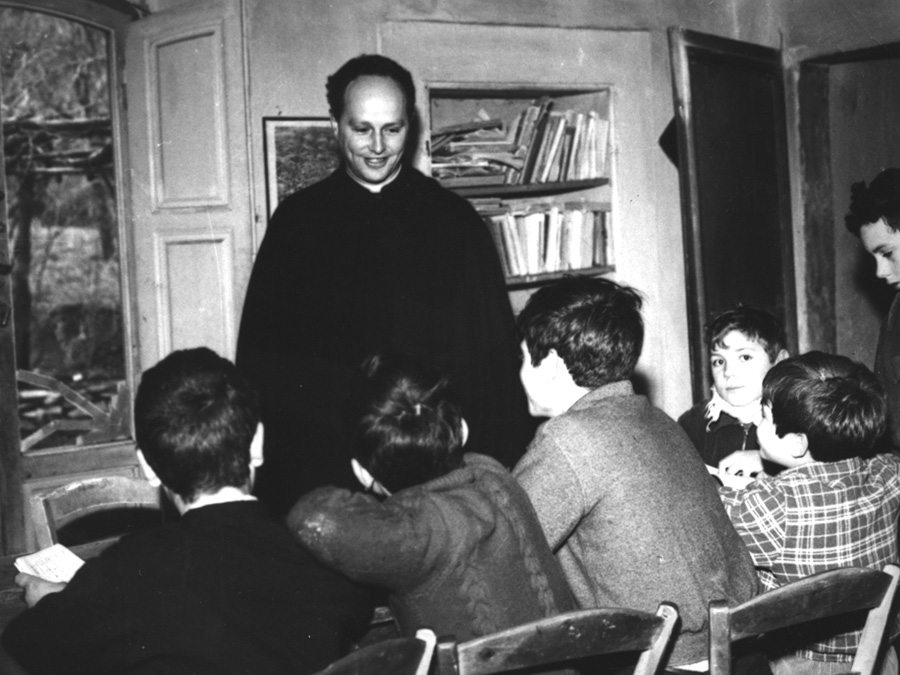
Don Milani with his pupils in the School of Barbiana

Lorenzo Carlo Domenico Milani Comparetti (27 May 1923 – 26 June 1967) was an Italian Catholic priest. He was an educator of poor children and an advocate of conscientious objection.

== Biography ==
Milani was born in Florence in 1923 to a rich middle-class family. His father, Albano Milani, and his mother, Alice Weiss, were staunch secularists. Alice Weiss was Jewish and a cousin of Edoardo Weiss, one of Sigmund Freud's earliest disciples and the founder of the Italian Psychoanalytic Association. Milani's paternal great-grandfather was Domenico Comparetti, a leading nineteenth-century philologist. In his own work as an educationist, Milani emphasized learning how to use words effectively.

In June 1943, after a period of study at the Brera Academy, Milani converted from agnosticism to Catholicism, perhaps after a chance conversation with Don Raffaele Bensi, who later became his spiritual director. He also exchanged a complacency of the economically fortunate for solidarity with the poor and despised. He was ordained a priest in 1947 and sent to assist Don Daniele Pugi, the old parish priest of San Donato in Calenzano. There he established his first school of the people (scuola popolare), The fact that it served children from both believing and non-believing families scandalized conservative Catholic circles. After Pugi's death in 1954, Milani was sent to Barbiana, a small, remote village in the Mugello region.

At Barbiana, Milani continued his radical educational activities despite both clerical and lay opposition.

== Writings ==
In the spring of 1958, he published his first book, Pastoral Experiences (Esperienze pastorali). In December, the Holy Office ordered its withdrawal from circulation as "inopportune", despite failing to find in it any errors of doctrine or breaches of ecclesiastical discipline. Milani made no public objection.

In his "Letter to Military Chaplains" ("Lettera ai cappellani militari"}, and a later letter to judges he advocated conscientious objection, the right to say "No". His writings on this subject are recognized as important contributions to anti-military education. In 1965, Milani was put on trial for these writings.

Working for a year with his pupils, Milani coordinated the production of Letter to a Teacher (Lettera a una professoressa), which denounced the inequalities of a class-based educational system that advantaged the children of the rich over those of the poor. It was composed by eight boys from the school of Barbiana, according to the "group writing" method inspired by the cooperative writing method promoted by Mario Lodi and influenced by Celesine Freinet. Lodi visited Barbiana and his students engaged in exchanges with those at Barbiana. It has been translated into about forty languages. It introduces many of the themes that became prominent in the later development of the Sociology of Education. The text served as a manifesto for the 68 movement, serving as an indictment of not only the Italian schooling system but Italian society at large.

=== Publications ===
Milani’s works include;

- Esperienze pastorali (1957)
- Lettera a una professoressa (1967)
- L'obbedienza non è più una virtù e gli altri scritti pubblici
- A che serve avere le mani pulite se si tengono in tasca
- Carta a una mestra
- Perché mi hai chiamato?

== Death and legacy ==
In 1967, shortly after the publication of Letter to a Teacher, Milani died in his mother's house in Florence of leukemia.

In 2008 Helena Dalli, an MP and member of the Malta Labour Party, summarized Milani's life and work: "Milani's ideas were considered dangerously radical and his bishop sent him into a sort of exile to a small mountain village north of Florence called Barbiana, thought too remote for him to cause problems. He started a full-time school there for children who had been failed or abandoned by the traditional education system. Eventually, hundreds of pupils of all ages were attracted to his teaching methods. Artists, farmers, scientists, artisans and professionals were invited to give hands-on explanations of their activities. Pupils were also made to read and evaluate national and international news. The aim was to educate them to analyze events critically so as to face life without fear and to solve problems with determination and awareness."

A documentary film from RAI describes Lorenzo Milani's educational project and its impact on Italian society. The film includes interviews with former students of the school at Barbiana and others. (The film is available with English text).

Pope Francis visited Barbiana on 20 June 2017 to visit and pray at Milani's tomb.

== See also ==
- Streetwise priest
