= Minoan art =

Art produced by the Minoan civilization

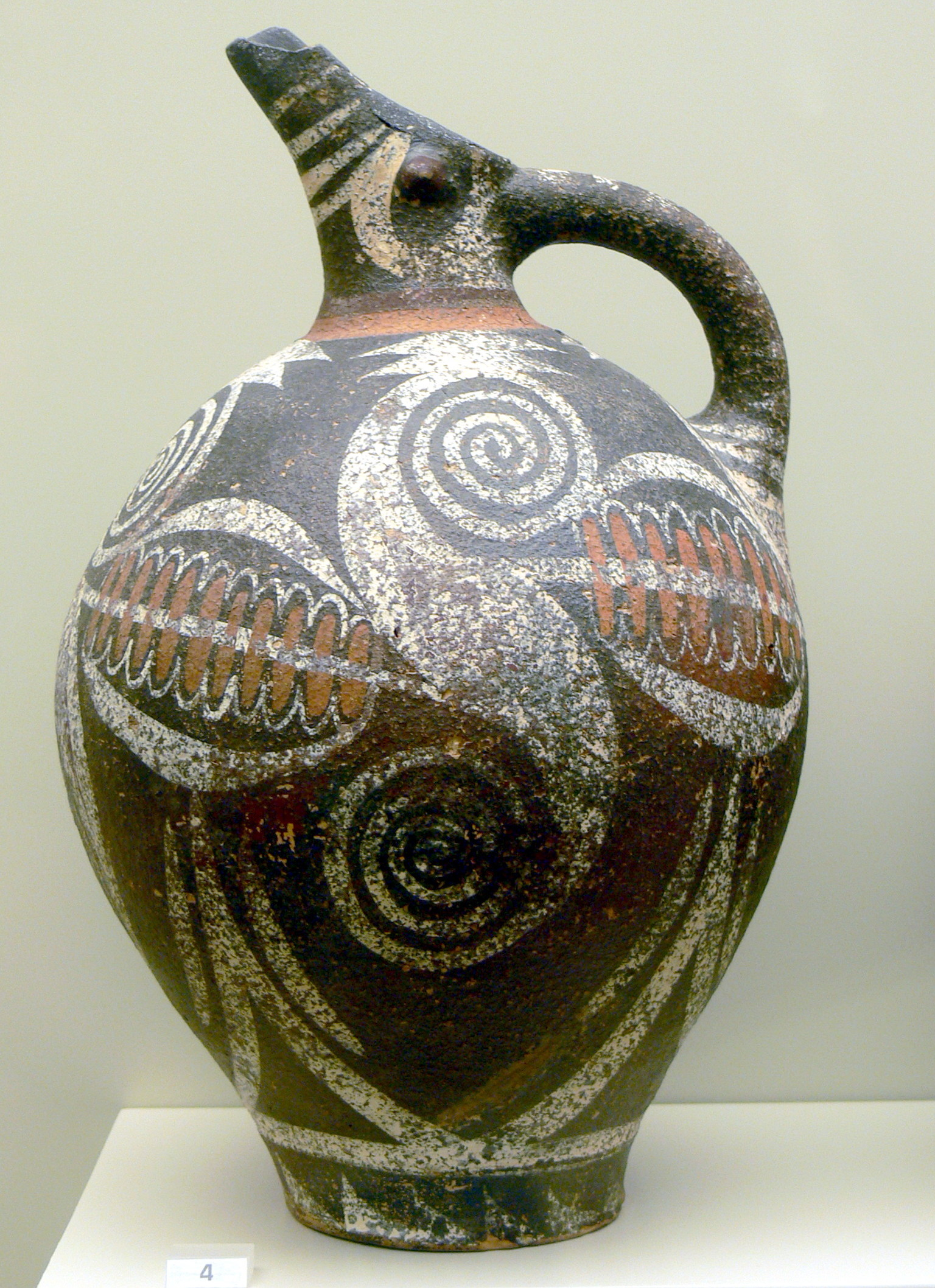
Kamares ware jug, AMH, MM IA (c. 2000 BC).

One quick version of the Minoan chronology, Early, Middle and Late periods
3500–2900 BC	EMI	Prepalatial
2900–2300 BC	EMII	Prepalatial
2300–2100 BC	EMIII	Prepalatial
2100–1900 BC	MMIA	Prepalatial
1900–1800 BC	MMIB	Protopalatial (Old Palace Period)
1800–1750 BC	MMIIA	Protopalatial (Old Palace Period)
1750–1700 BC	MMIIB	Neopalatial (New Palace Period)
1700–1650 BC	MMIIIA	Neopalatial (New Palace Period)
1650–1600 BC	MMIIIB	Neopalatial (New Palace Period)
1600–1500 BC	LMIA	Neopalatial (New Palace Period)
1500–1450 BC	LMIB	Postpalatial (at Knossos; Final Palace Period)
1450–1400 BC	LMII	Postpalatial (at Knossos; Final Palace Period)
1400–1350 BC	LMIIIA	Postpalatial (at Knossos; Final Palace Period)
1350–1100 BC	LMIIIB	Postpalatial (at Knossos; Final Palace Period)

Minoan art is the art produced by the Bronze Age Aegean Minoan civilization from about 3000 to 1100 BC, though the most extensive and finest survivals come from approximately 2300 to 1400 BC. It forms part of the wider grouping of Aegean art, and in later periods came for a time to have a dominant influence over Cycladic art. Since wood and textiles have decomposed, the best-preserved (and most instructive) surviving examples of Minoan art are its pottery, palace architecture (with frescos which include "the earliest pure landscapes anywhere"), small sculptures in various materials, jewellery, metal vessels, and intricately-carved seals.

It was influenced by the neighbouring cultures of Ancient Egypt and the ancient Near East, which had produced sophisticated urban art for much longer, but the character of the small but wealthy mercantile Minoan cities was very different, with little evidence of large temple-based religion, monarchs, or warfare, and "all the imaginative power and childlike freshness of a very young culture". All these aspects of the Minoan culture remain rather mysterious. Sinclair Hood described an "essential quality of the finest Minoan art, the ability to create an atmosphere of movement and life although following a set of highly formal conventions".

The largest and best collection of Minoan art is in the Heraklion Archaeological Museum ("AMH") near Knossos, on the northern coast of Crete. Minoan art and other remnants of material culture, especially the sequence of ceramic styles, have been used by archaeologists to define the three main phases of Minoan culture (EM, MM, LM), and their many sub-phases. The dates to be attached to these remain much discussed, although within narrowing ranges.

The relationship of Minoan art to that of other contemporary cultures and later Ancient Greek art has been much discussed. It clearly dominated Mycenaean art and Cycladic art of the same periods, even after Crete was occupied by the Mycenaeans, but only some aspects of the tradition survived the Greek Dark Ages after the collapse of Mycenaean Greece.

== Subjects and style ==
Minoan art has a variety of subject-matter, much of it appearing across different media, although only some styles of pottery include figurative scenes. Bull-leaping appears in painting and several types of sculpture, and is thought to have had a religious significance; bulls' heads are also a popular subject in terracotta and other sculptural materials. There are no figures that appear to be portraits of individuals, or are clearly royal, and the identities of religious figures is often tentative, with scholars uncertain whether they are deities, clergy or devotees. Equally, whether painted rooms were "shrines" or secular is far from clear; one room in Akrotiri has been argued to be a bedroom, with remains of a bed, or a shrine.

Animals, including an unusual variety of marine fauna, are often depicted; the "Marine Style" is a type of painted palace pottery from MM III and LM IA that paints sea creatures including octopus spreading all over the vessel, and probably originated from similar frescoed scenes; sometimes these appear in other media. Scenes of hunting and warfare, and horses and riders, are mostly found in later periods, in works perhaps made by Cretans for a Mycenaean market, or Mycenaean overlords of Crete.

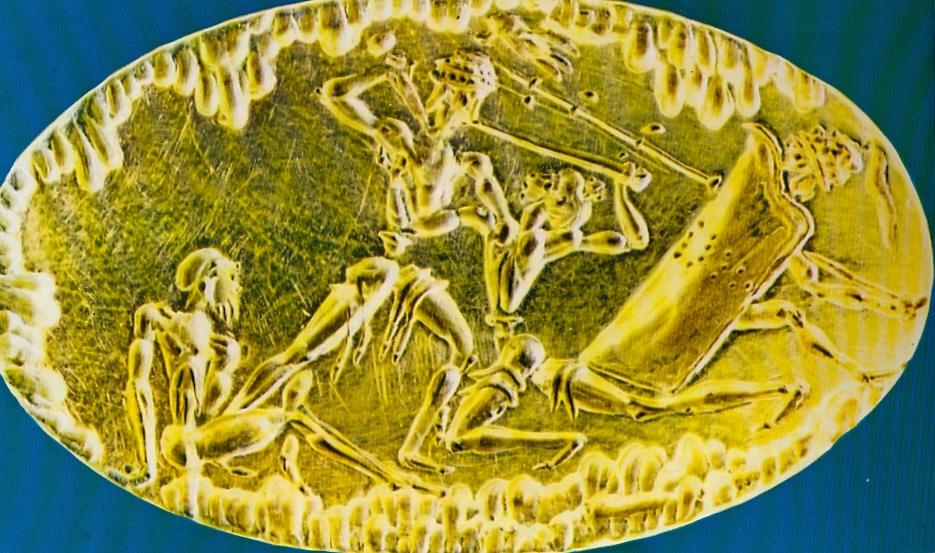
The "Battle of the Glen" gold ring shows the Minoan landscape convention, with rocks above and below. Buried at Mycenae.

While Minoan figures, whether human or animal, have a great sense of life and movement, they are often not very accurate, and the species is sometimes impossible to identify; by comparison with Ancient Egyptian art they are often more vivid, but less naturalistic. However. it has been argued that the hybrid forms of flowering plants in frescos "reinforces the unearthly, magical, quality of the composition", as does the depiction together of flowers that actually appear at very different seasons.

In comparison with the art of other ancient cultures there is a high proportion of female figures, though the idea that Minoans had only goddesses and no gods is now discounted. Most human figures are in profile or in a version of the Egyptian convention with the head and legs in profile, and the torso seen frontally; but the Minoan figures exaggerate features such as slim male waists and large female breasts.

What is called landscape painting is found in both frescos and on painted pots, and sometimes in other media, but most of the time this consists of plants shown fringing a scene, or dotted around within it. There is a particular visual convention where the surroundings of the main subject are laid out as though seen from above, though individual specimens are shown in profile. This accounts for the rocks being shown all round a scene, with flowers apparently growing down from the top. The seascapes surrounding some scenes of fish and of boats, and in the Ship Procession miniature fresco from Akrotiri, land with a settlement as well, give a wider landscape than is usual, and a more conventional arrangement of the view.

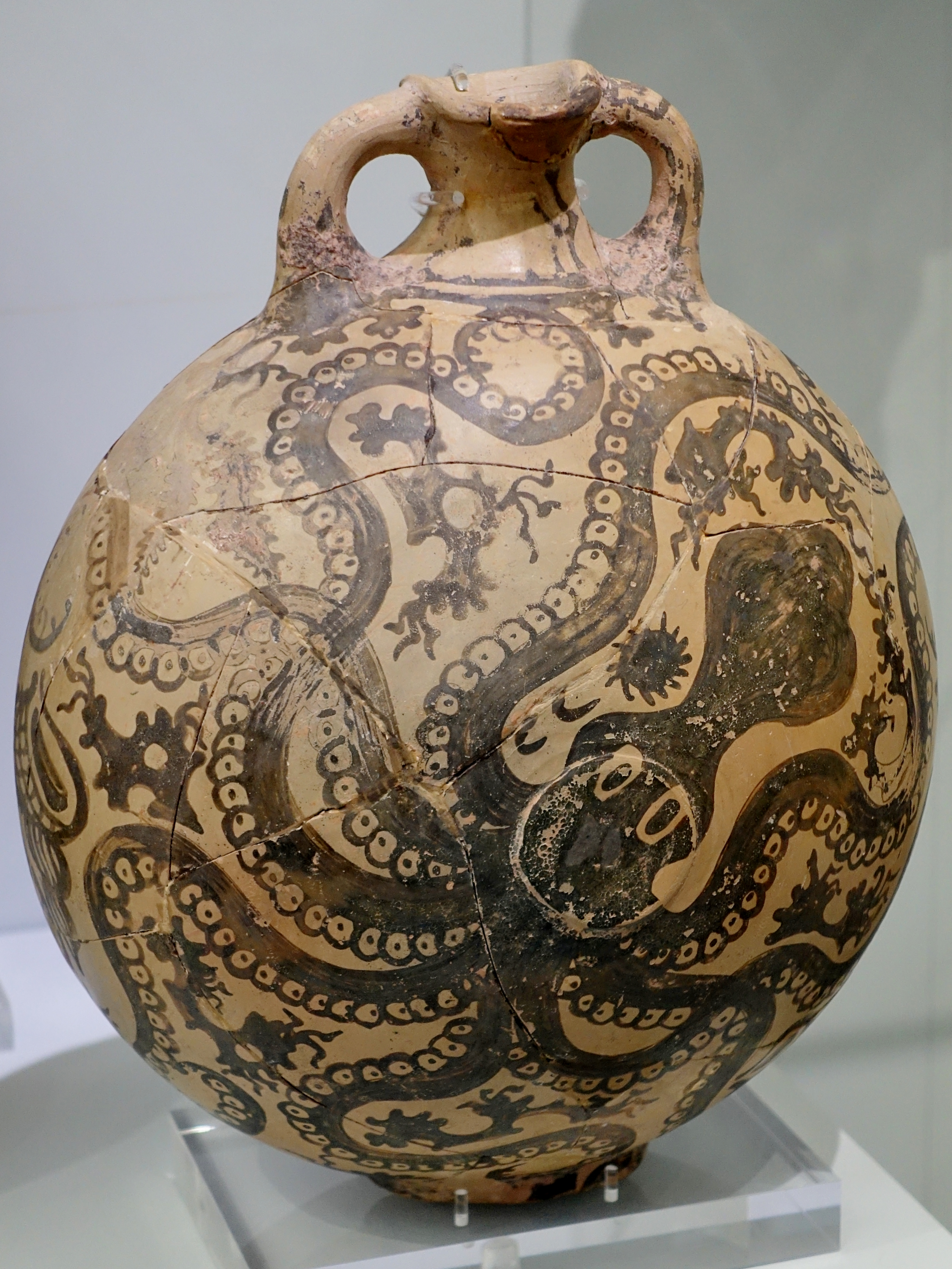
Marine Style vase from Palaikastro, AMH.

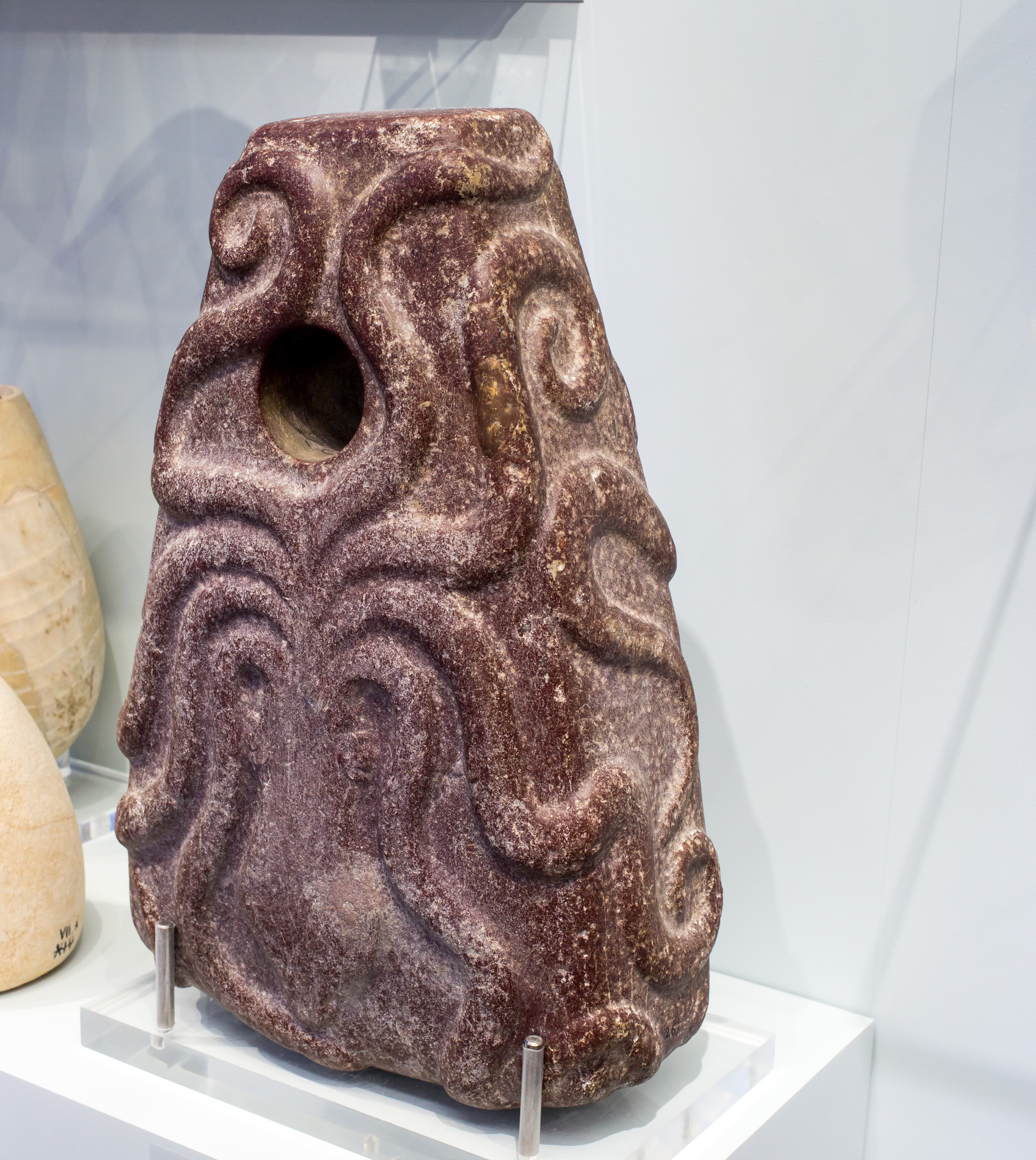
Octopus on an anchor or weight in porphyry, LM, AMH

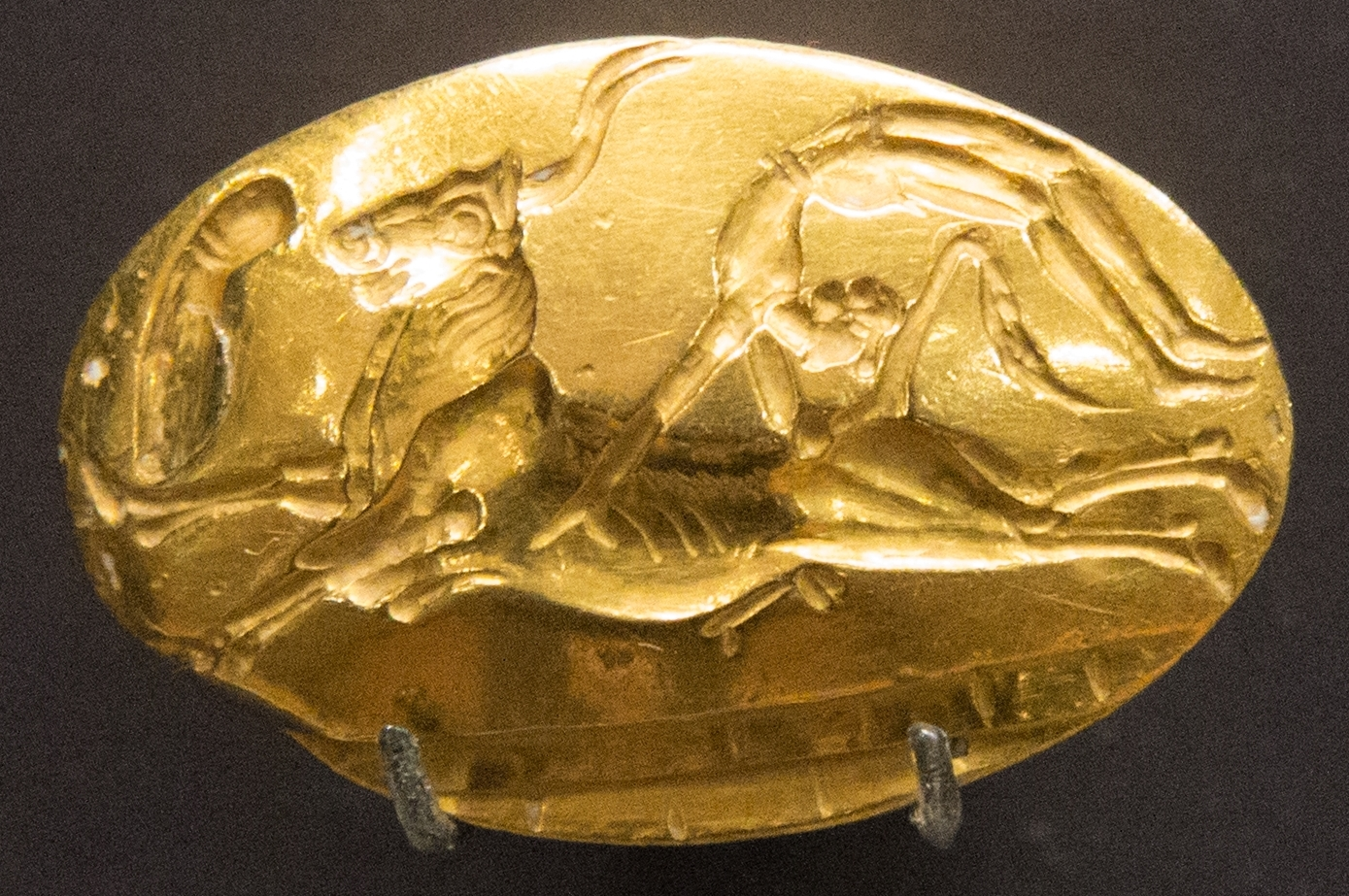
Bull-leaping on a gold signet ring

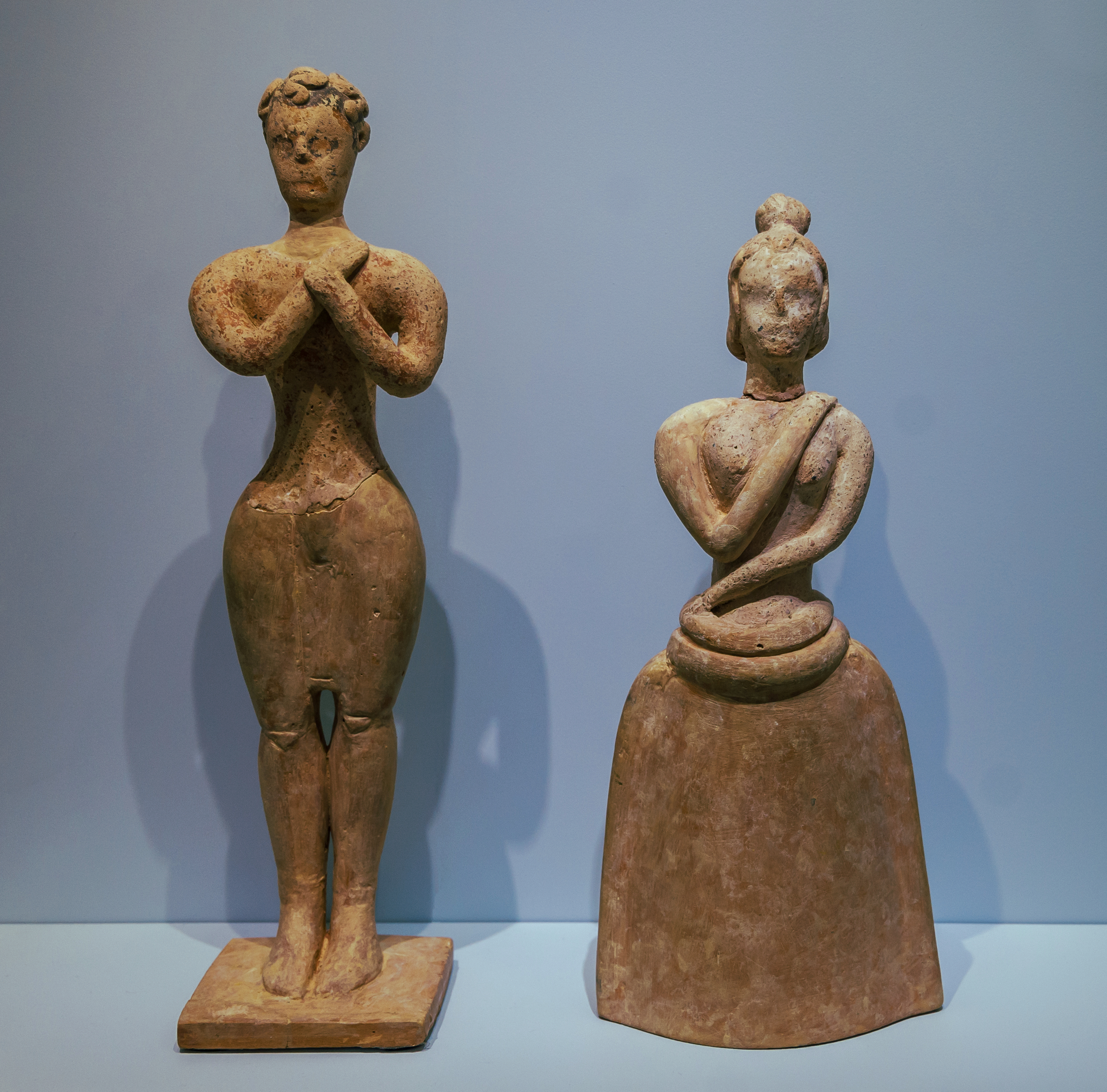
Worshipping couple, terracotta, AMH

== Painting ==
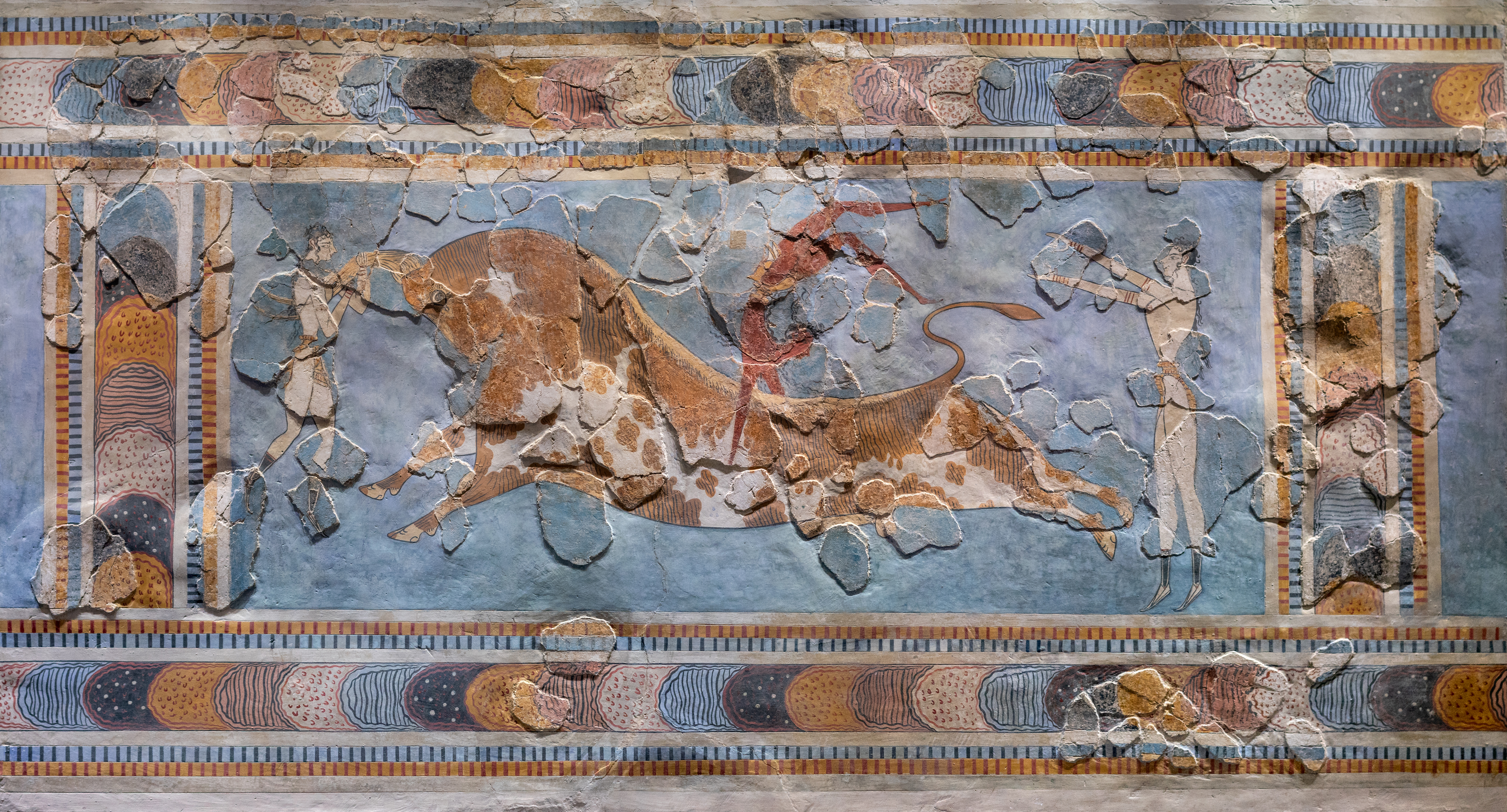
The Bull-leaping fresco from Knossos, AMH.

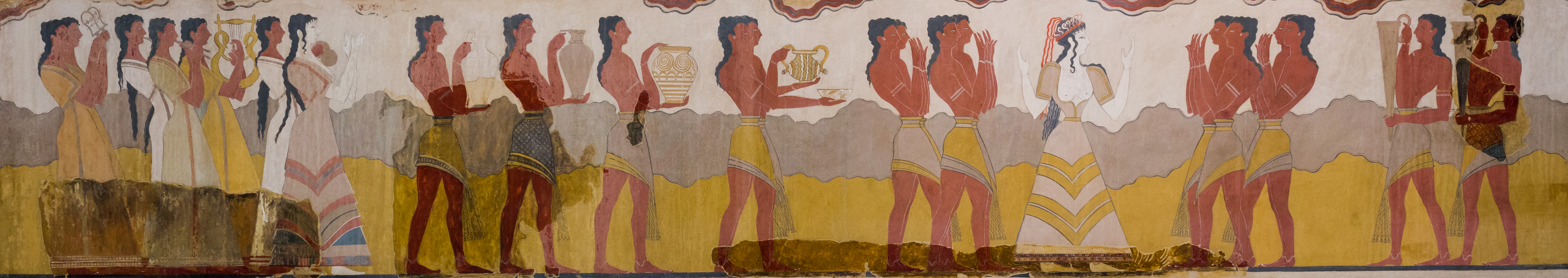
Procession fresco from Knossos; of the 23 figures, most feet are original, but only the head at extreme right

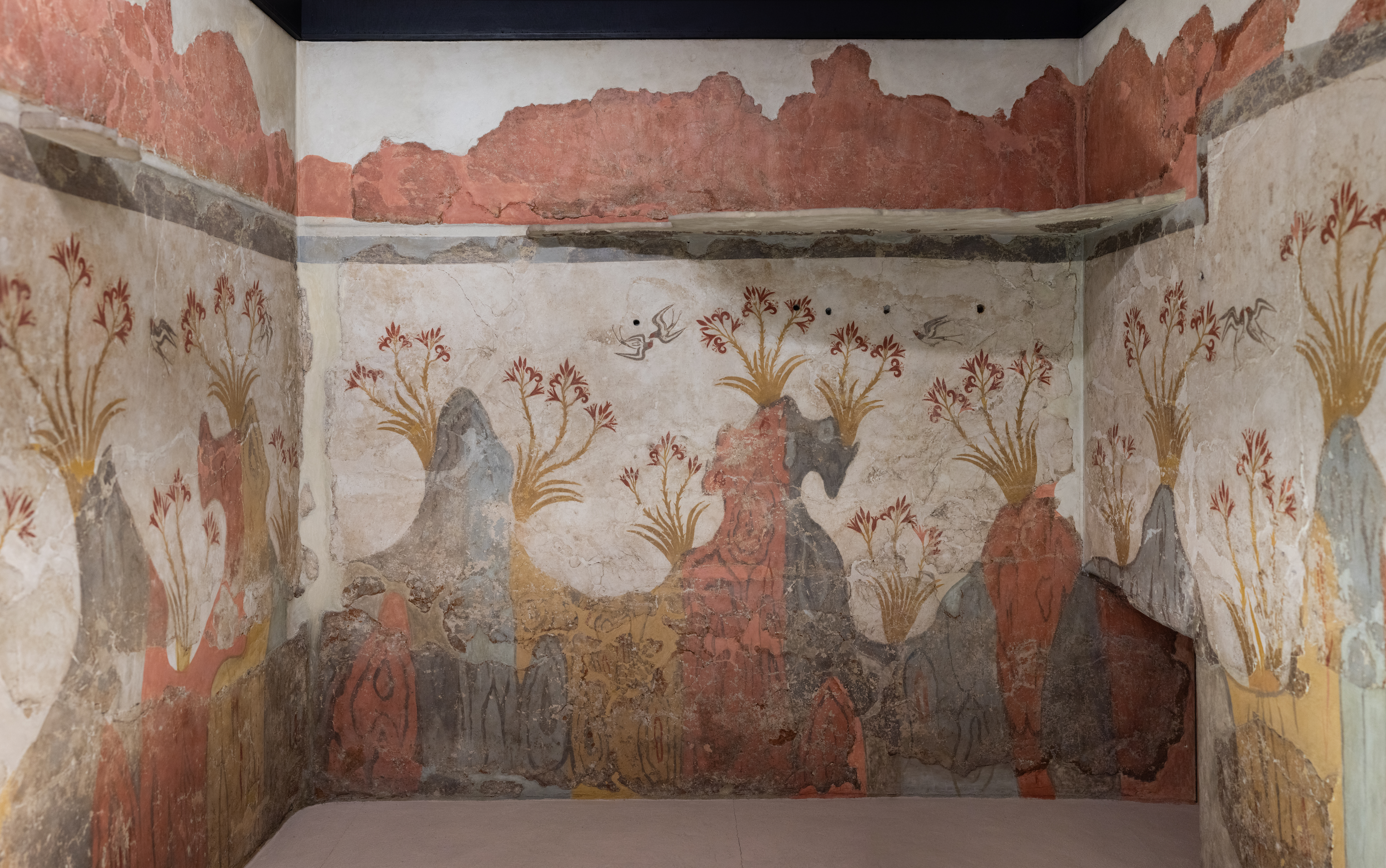
The Spring Fresco from Akrotiri, "the earliest pure landscapes anywhere", far better preserved than those at Knossos.

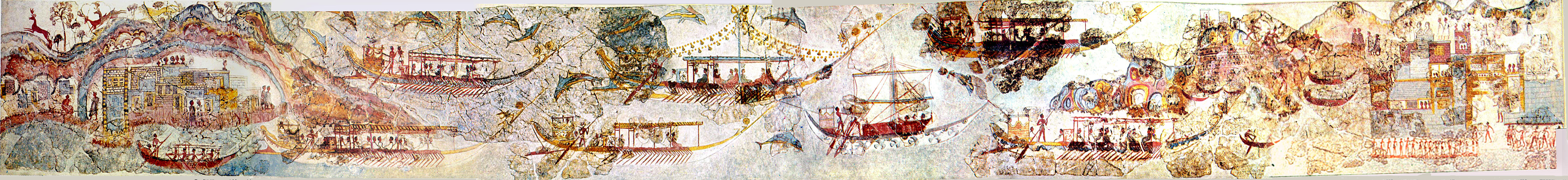
"Ship Procession" fresco, from Akrotiri

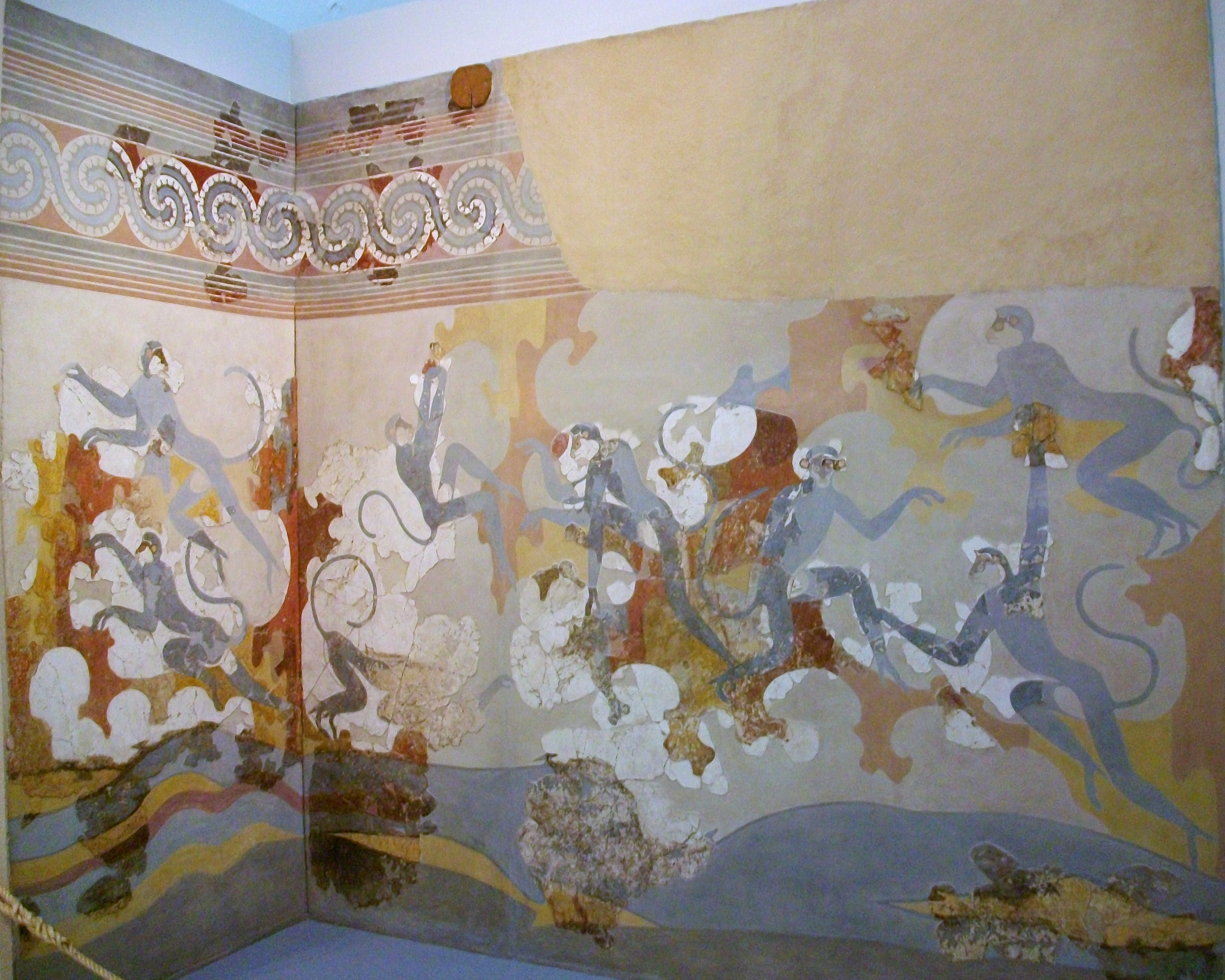
Blue monkey fresco from Akrotiri

Several frescoes have been found, on Crete normally in partial fragments which require a good deal of reconstruction; sometimes only 5% of a reconstructed section is original. Surviving figurative examples date from MM III onwards, the same technique having been used earlier for plain colours and simple patterns. They were probably inspired by Syrian or Egyptian examples, the former perhaps more likely. The most important sites are Knossos and on Santorini, and they were found both in the large "palaces" of the cities (but not all of them) and in "villas" and larger city houses.

The frescos include many depictions of people, with the sexes distinguished by a "violent contrast" of colour that is more extreme than the equivalent in Egypt; the men's skin is reddish-brown, and the women's white. Probably the most famous fresco is the bull-leaping fresco. Other well-known sections are the female fragment known as La Parisienne (from the "Camp Stool Fresco"), and the Prince of the Lilies (mostly restored), both from Knossos, and the Akrotiri Boxer Fresco, but there are many others, both from Crete itself and related Aegean sites.

Arthur Evans, the first archaeologist to excavate Minoan Knossos, hired the Swiss artist Emile Gilliéron and his son, Émile, as the chief fresco restorers at Knossos. The restorations have been often criticised subsequently; and are now viewed with a "healthy skepticism" as "overconfident" by specialists. In one important case a figure of a monkey was turned into a boy; in fact human figures do not usually appear in "landscape" fresco scenes.

Spyridon Marinatos excavated the ancient site at Akrotiri, then capital of Santorini, which included the Wall Paintings of Thera, frescoes which make it the second-most famous Minoan site. Although the paintings are rather less refined, and its political relationship with Crete is uncertain, the town was covered in volcanic ash in the Minoan eruption around 1600 BC, and many of them have survived far more completely than those from Crete. Unusually, they include life-size female figures, one apparently a priestess.

Evans and other early archaeologists tended to regard the wall paintings as a natural way to decorate palatial rooms, as they were in the Italian Renaissance, but more recent scholars link them, or many of them, to Minoan religion, about which much remains obscure. One widely held view is that "Aegean landscape consistently reflects a reverence for nature that implies the overarching presence of a Minoan goddess of nature".

Most of the Minoan population probably rarely saw frescos, which were almost all in interior spaces in buildings controlled by the elite. When they did get access, the "visual evidence of the elite class's communication with divinity", expressed even in "landscape" subjects, may have had a "powerful psychological impact". Many centuries later, Homer's Odysseus speaks of "Knossos, where Minos reigned ... he that held converse with great Zeus". Frescos first appear in the "Neopalatial Period", in MM IIIA, at the same time as the peak sanctuaries seem to have become less used; the Knossos "Saffron Gatherer" (illustrated below) may be the earliest fresco to leave significant remains.

With a very few hints of modelling, the frescos normally use "flat" colour—pure colours with no shading, blending or attempt to represent form within coloured areas. Many wall paintings formed friezes set at eye level and some 70–80 cm high above a dado, with several painted parallel stripes above and below the images to frame them. The dados were normally also painted plaster, sometimes imitating natural stone patterns, but in grand buildings might be stone or gypsum slabs. When they were first discovered it was claimed that, in contrast to Egyptian frescos, Crete had "true" frescos, applied to wet plaster. This was subsequently disputed, and much discussed, and it may be that, as much later in Italy, both buon fresco and fresco secco, applied to wet and dry plaster respectively, were used at times.

In general, and with some possible exceptions, wall painters seem to have been a distinct group, and probably the most valued artists. But they were probably in close touch with pottery painters and gem carvers, and influence probably passed in both directions at times. Ornament also used in pottery can sometimes help to date paintings, which is otherwise only possible by style, which can be difficult. The main colours used in Minoan frescos include black (shale), white (slaked lime), red (hematite), yellow (ochre), blue (copper silicate) and green (yellow and blue mixed together).

Designs usually include at least large areas of plain colour as background. More complicated scenes often have the main figures and some surroundings at the edge of picture painted, with plain areas in between. In early paintings a red that was the usual colour for plain painted walls was used, sometimes with white (more common in Akrotiri), but later Egyptian blue became a popular background, until the latest periods.

There are a number of Minoan or Minoan-influenced frescos around the Aegean and on the Greek mainland, several probably done by Minoan artists. In Alalakh in modern Turkey, and Tel Kabri in Israel are further sites. The high quality Minoan frescoes from Tell el-Daba in Egypt may represent a result of a diplomatic marriage with a Minoan princess during the Eighteenth Dynasty of Egypt. They were excavated from 1990 to 2007. As with some Cretan palace frescos, these were later cleared and the painted plaster fragments dumped outside the building. They include scenes of bull-leaping, hunting, griffins, and Minoan-type female figures.

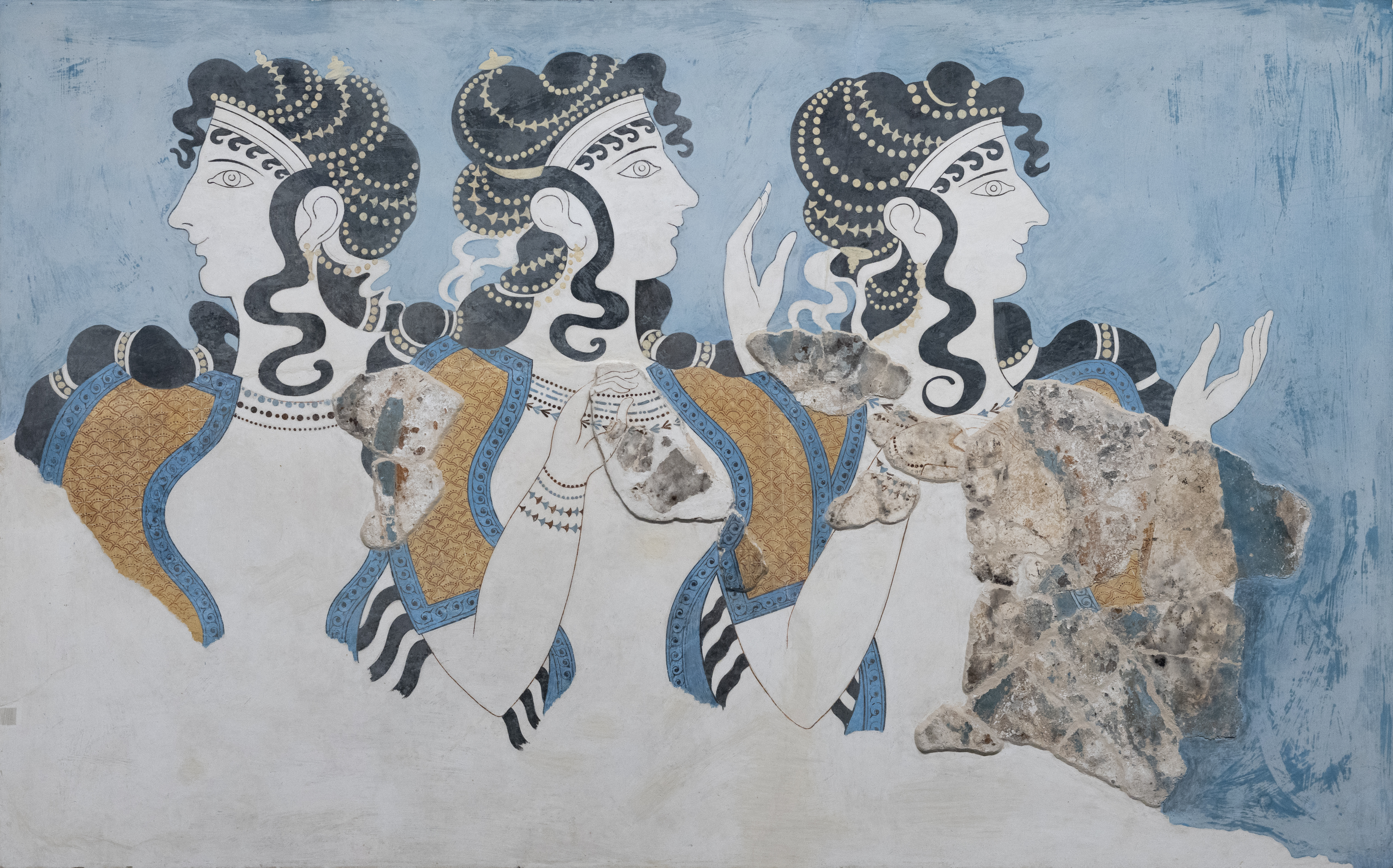
Knossos women fresco

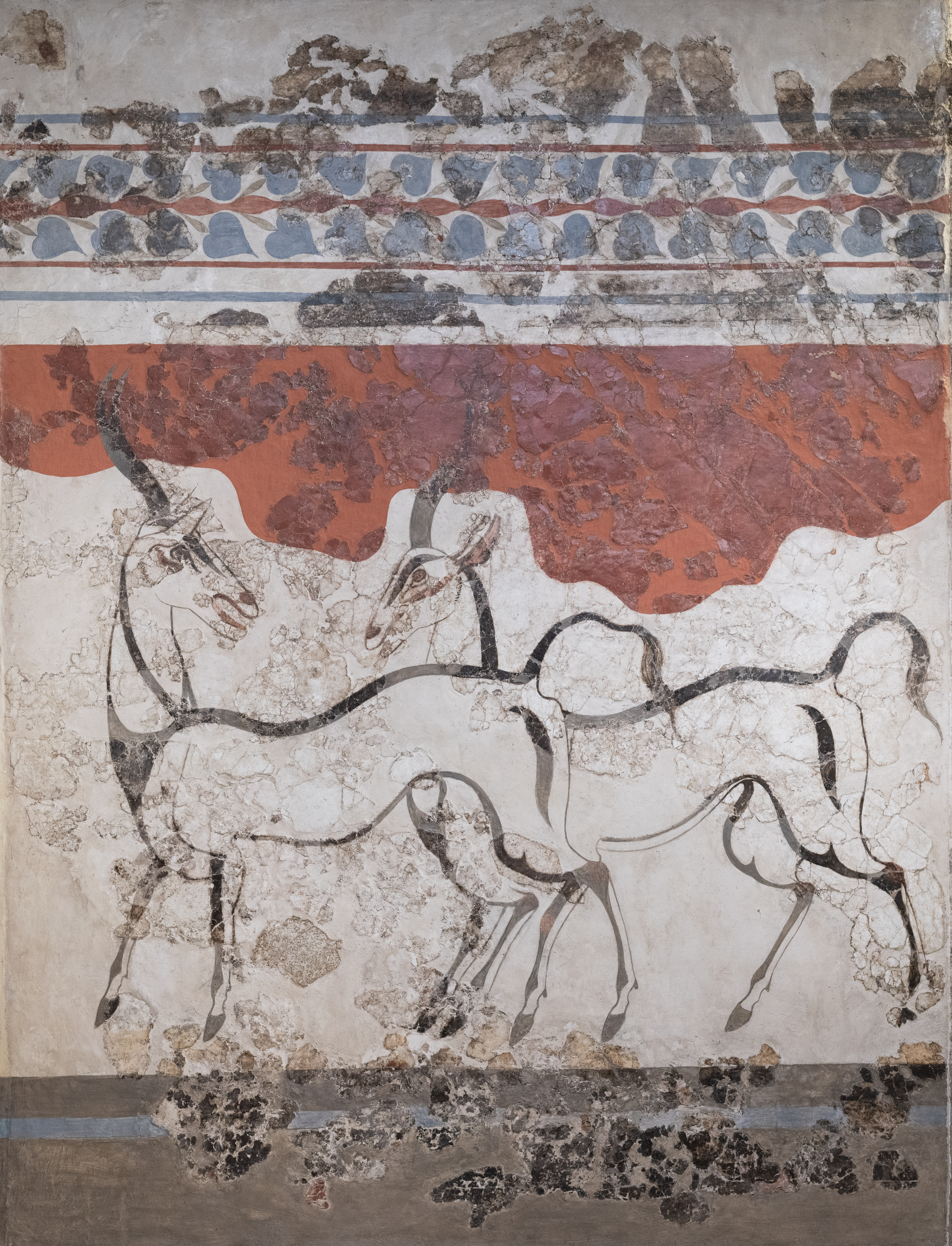
Antelopes fresco

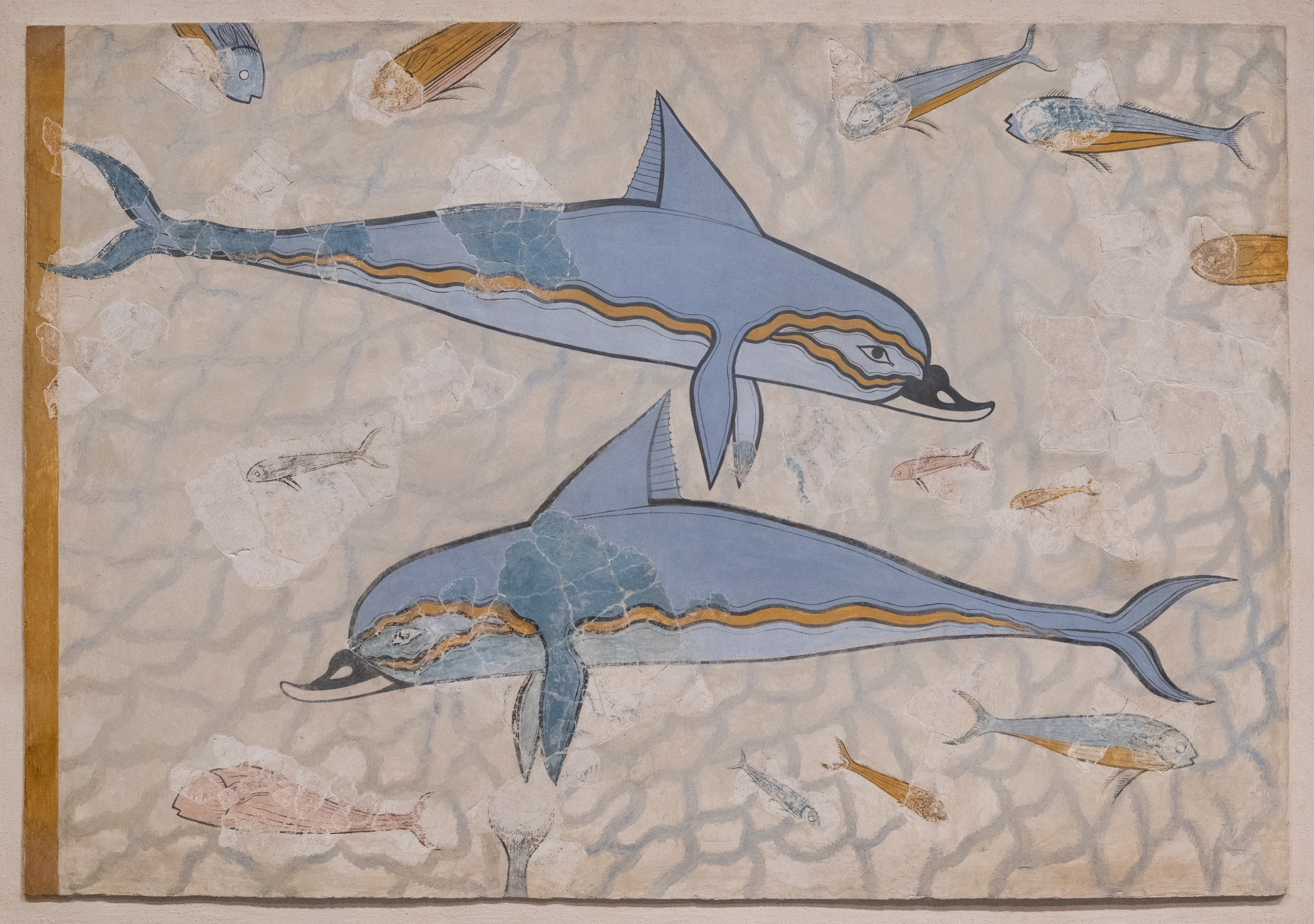
Dolphin fresco

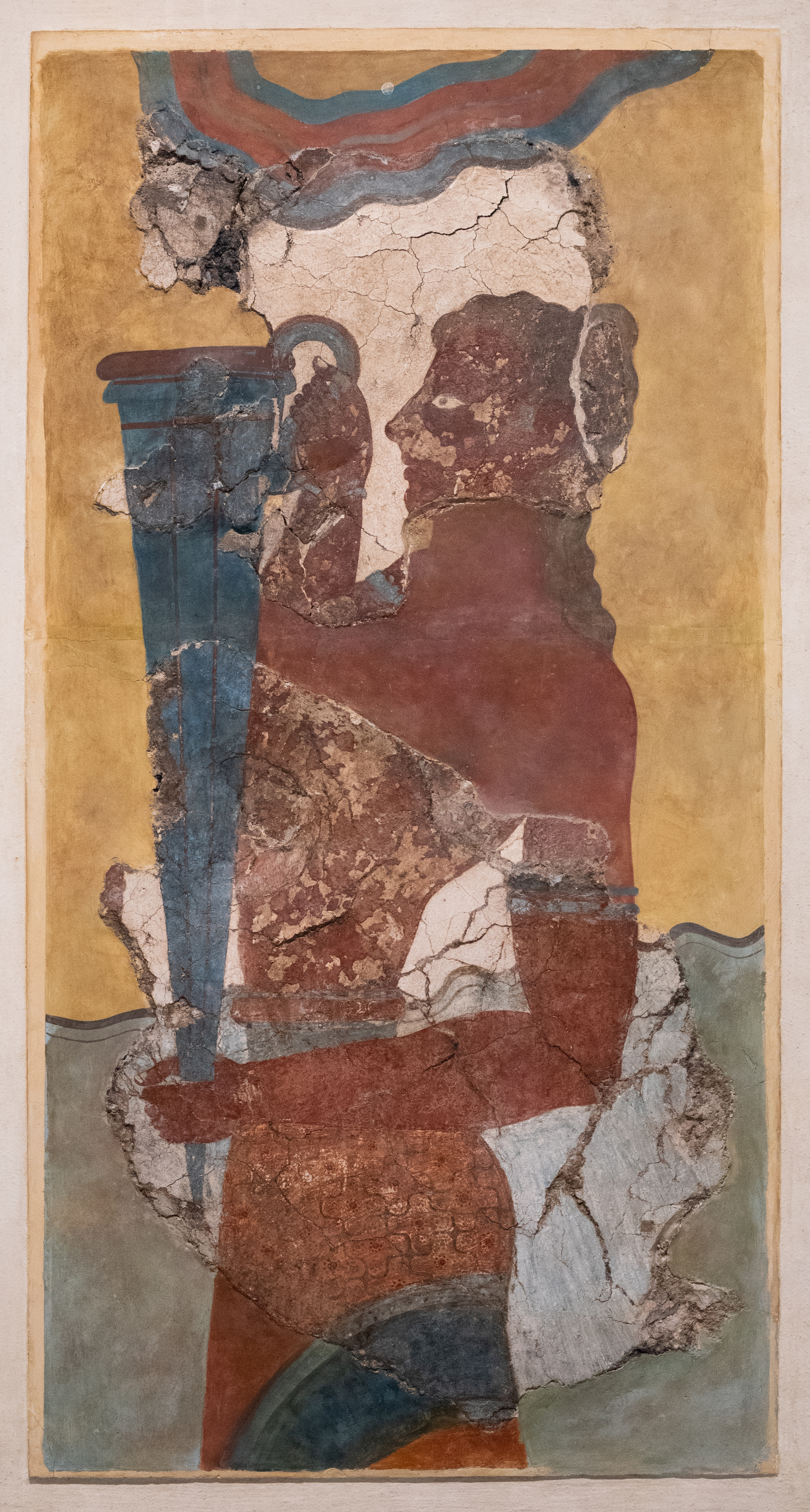
Cup bearer fresco

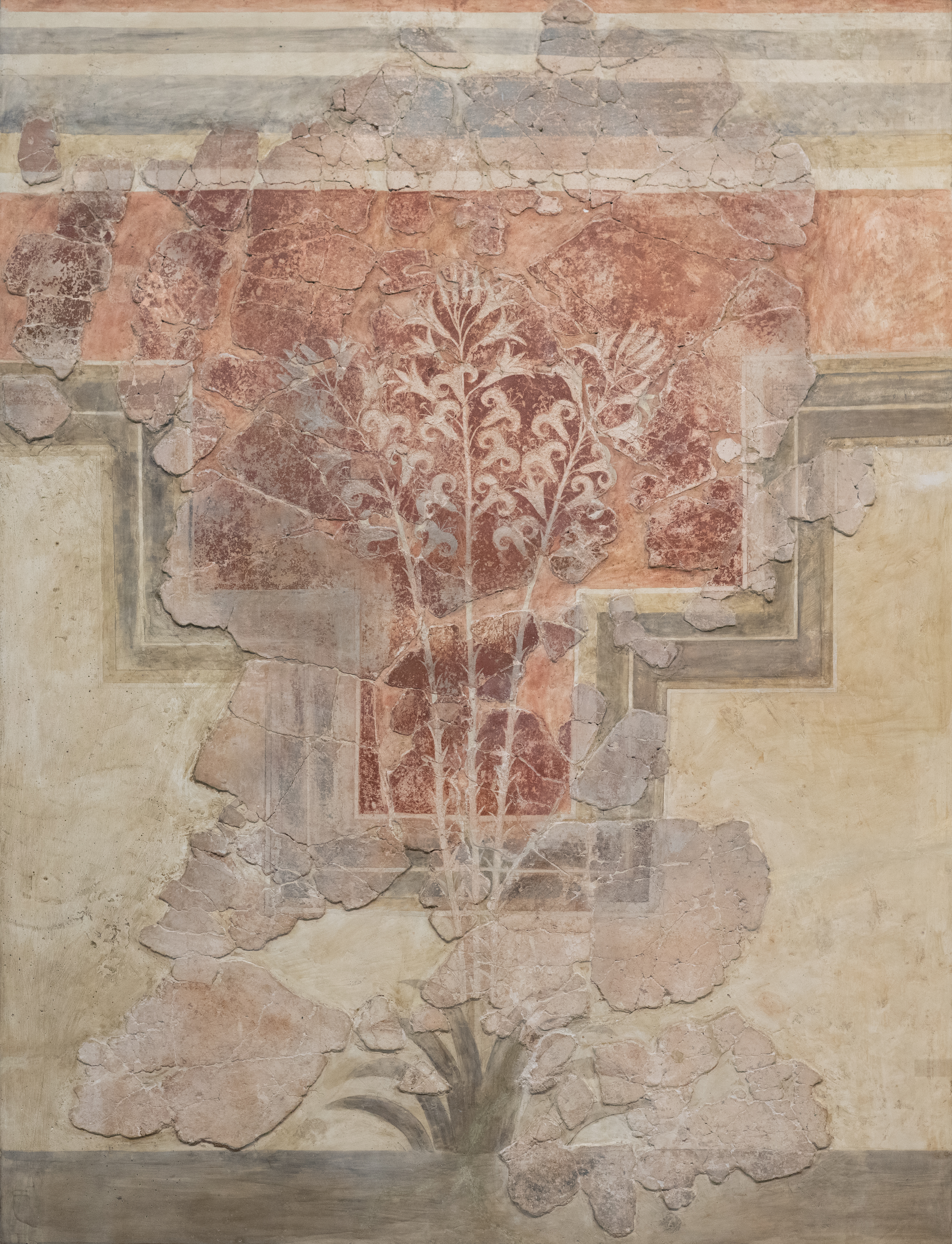
Wall-painting from the Amnisos villa, Archaeological Museum of Heraklion

=== Relief and miniature frescos ===
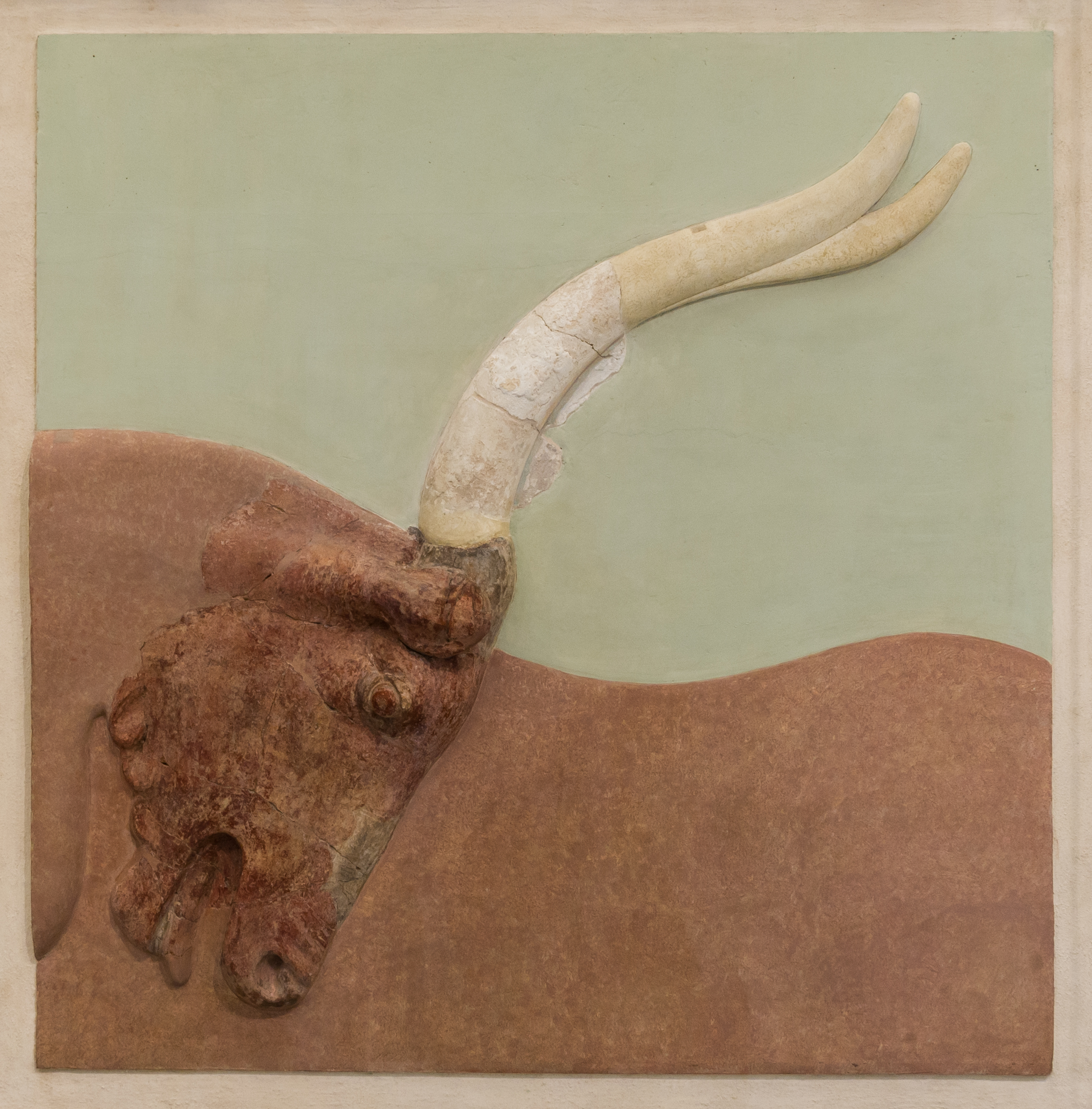
Relief fresco of a bull's head, part of a much larger scene, from Knossos, AMH

A different type of fresco is the relief fresco, also called "painted stuccos", where the plaster has been formed into a relief of the main subject before it is painted, probably in imitation of Egyptian stone reliefs. The technique is mostly, but not exclusively, used at Knossos, between MM II and LM I. The figures are large, and include humans, bulls, griffins and a lion seizing prey; the few fragments worked up into the so-called Prince of the Lilies (AMH) are of this type.

There may also have been ceiling reliefs of patterns of ornament; the Minoans also painted some floors with "normal" frescos, and the well-known scene of dolphins from Knossos may have been a floor-painting.

There are also a few "miniature frescos" where, rather than the usual few large figures, there are scenes with large numbers of small figures. The small figures represented as woven designs on the clothes of large figures are covered by the same term. Because of the large groups shown, and sometimes the wider landscape (as in the Ship Procession marine landscape from Akrotiri mentioned above), the miniature frescos include some of the most interesting scenes.

The very late limestone Hagia Triada sarcophagus, is uniquely elaborately painted and generally very well preserved. It records funerary ceremonies at a time when Crete was probably ruled by the Mycenaeans.

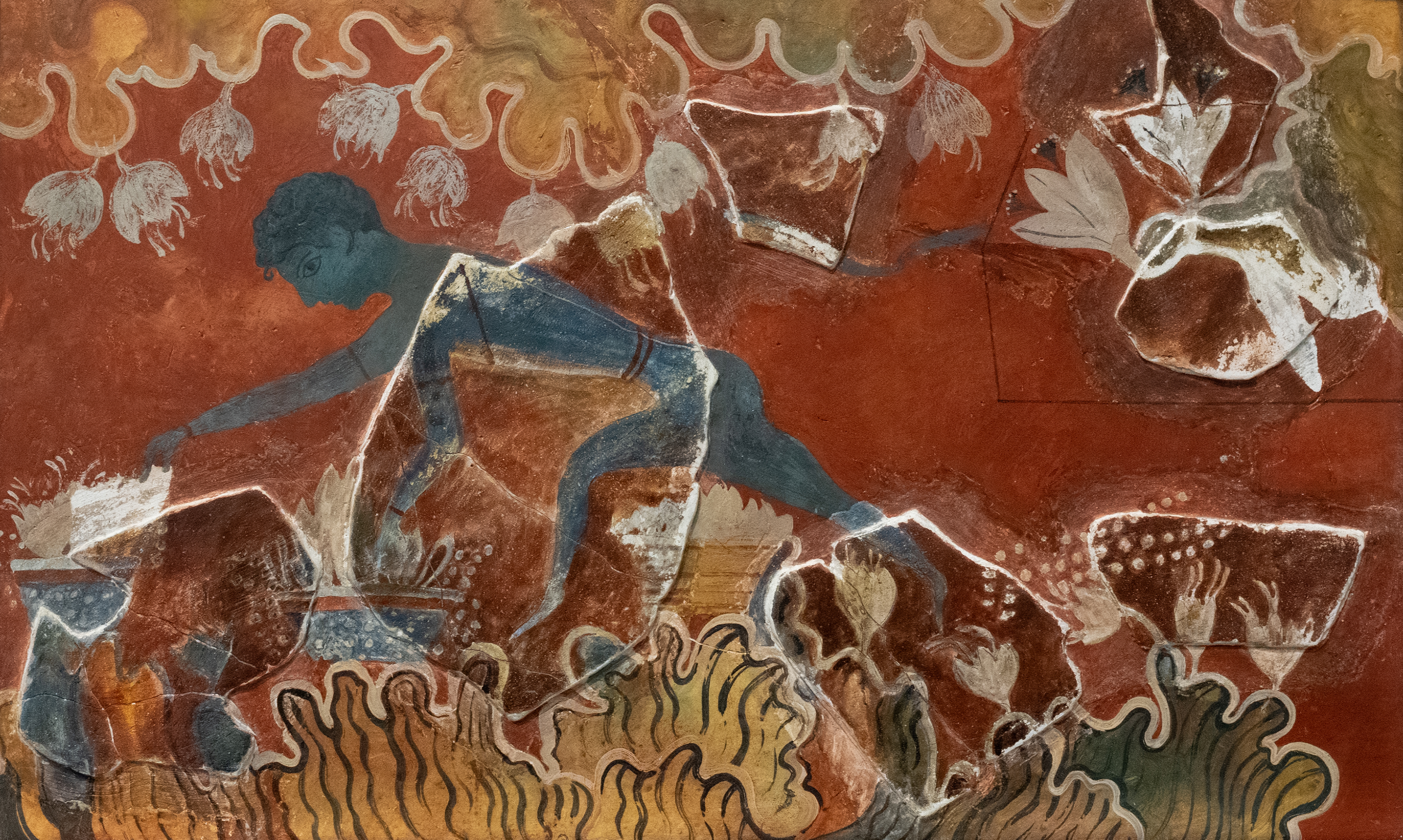
The Knossos Saffron Gatherer, Evan's restoration with boy, AMH, probably MM III.

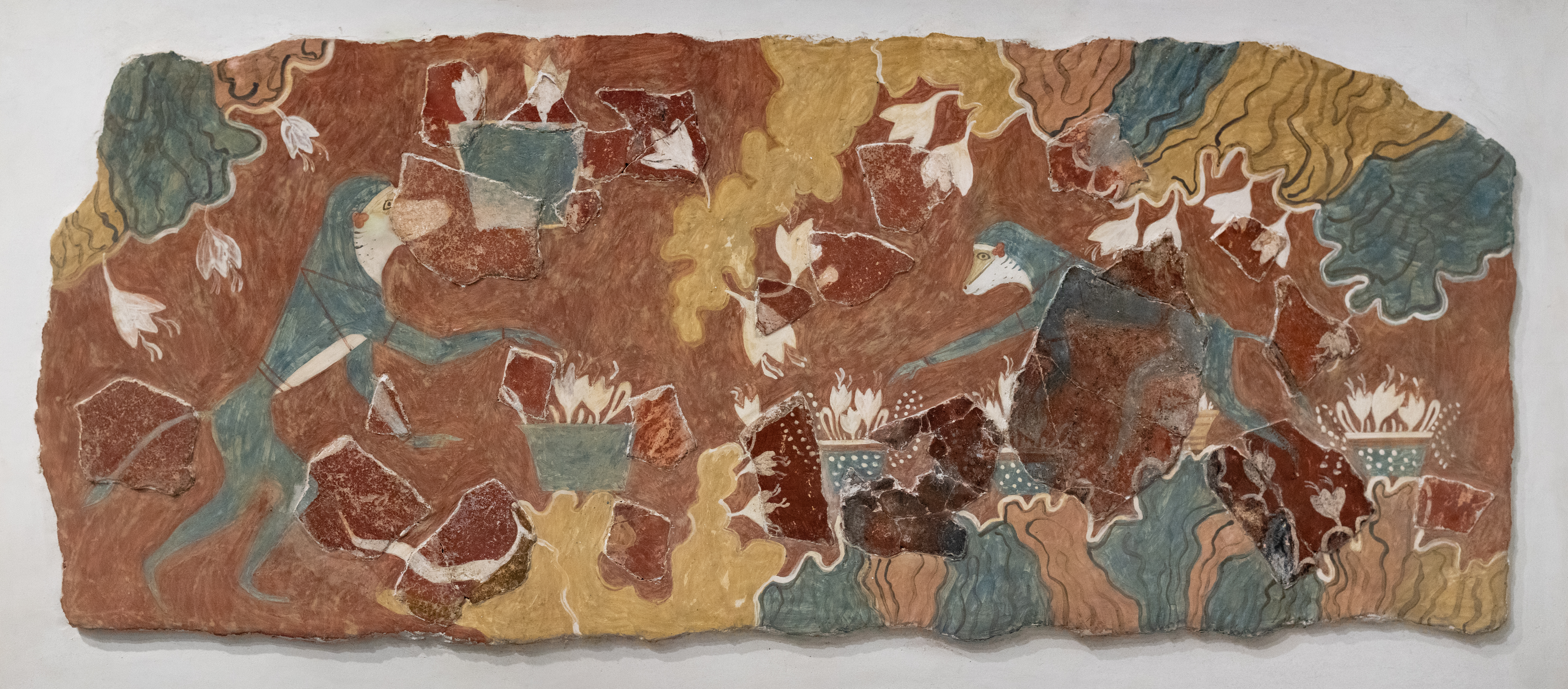
The same fragments (to right), restored with monkeys.

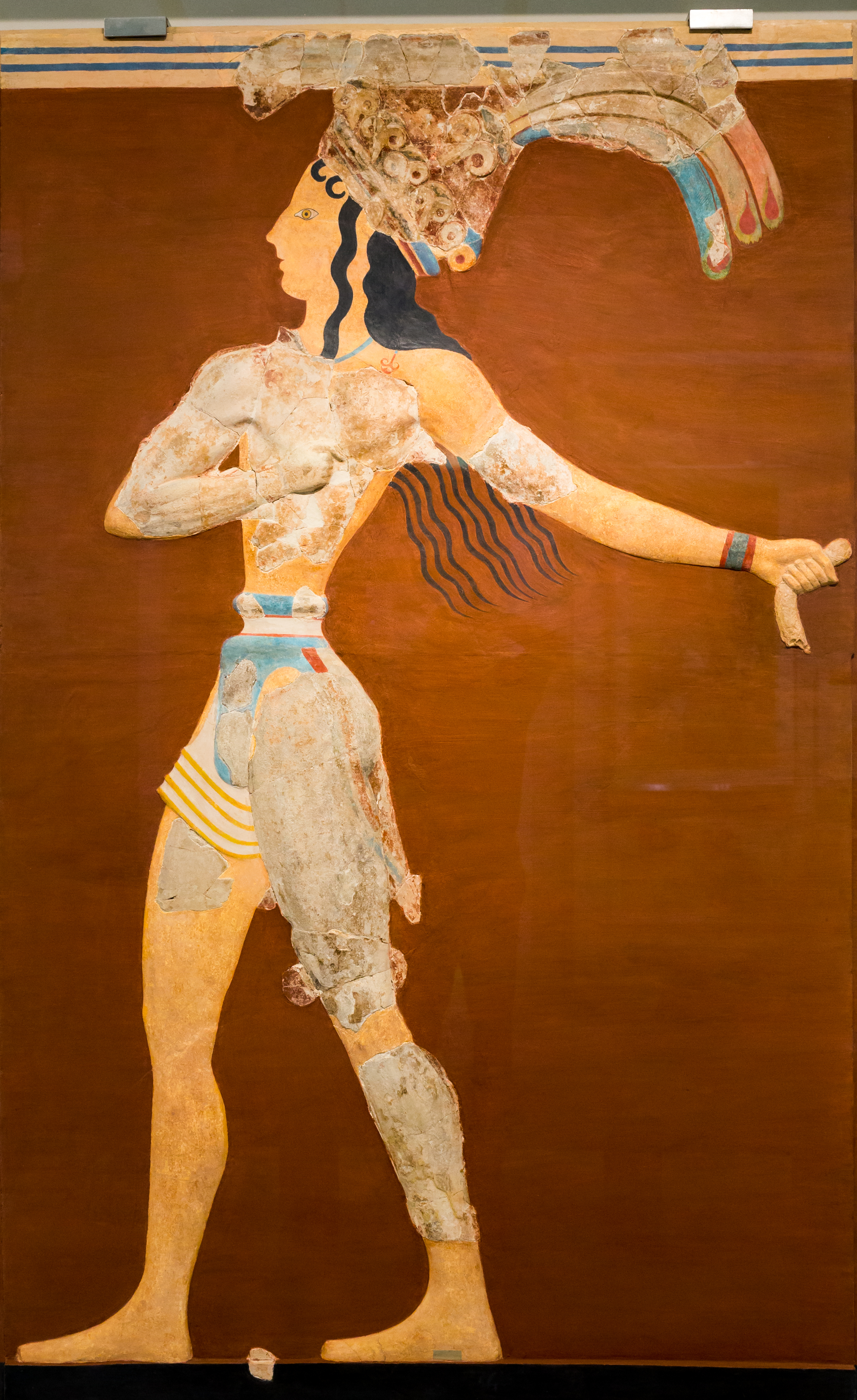
the so-called Prince of the Lilies from Knossos, a very controversial reconstruction, AMH

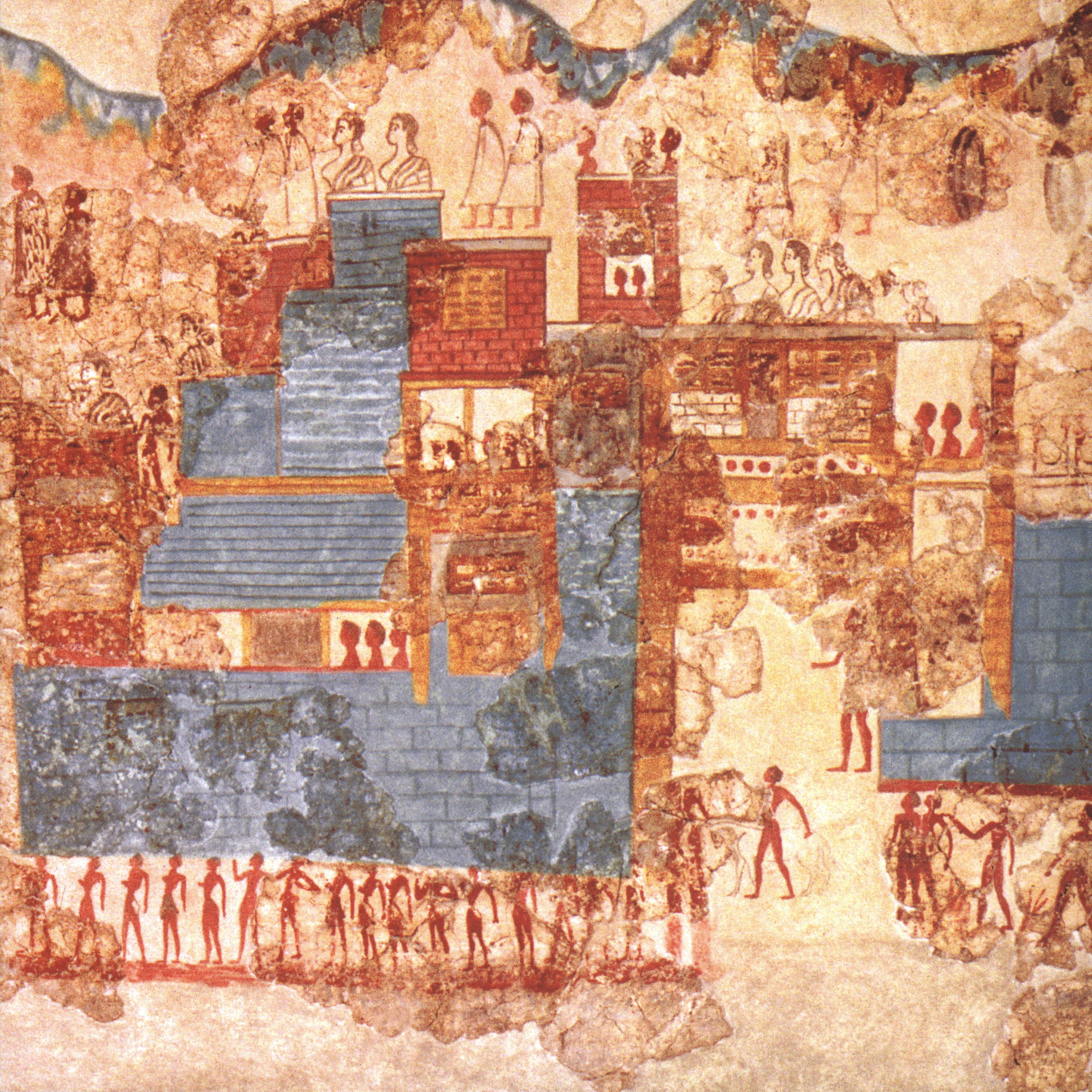
Detail of the town in the Sea Procession (full image above) marine landscape from Akrotiri

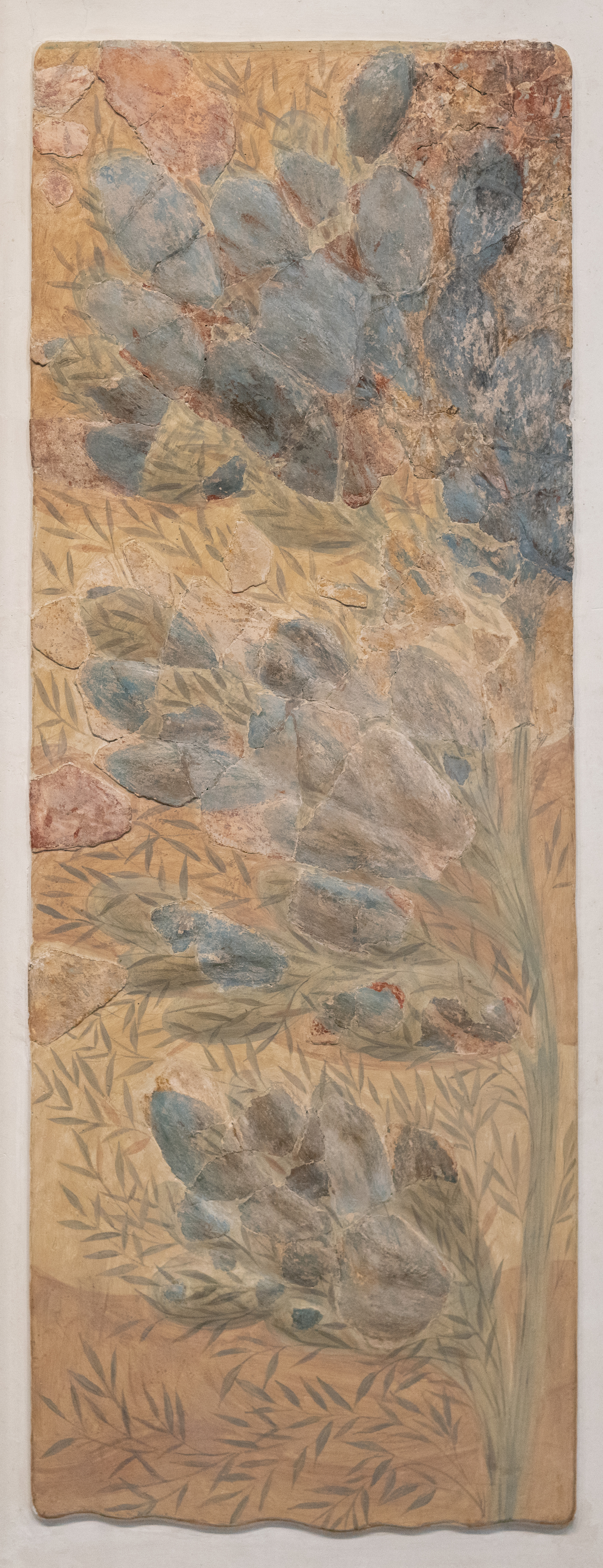
Knossos olive tree fresco

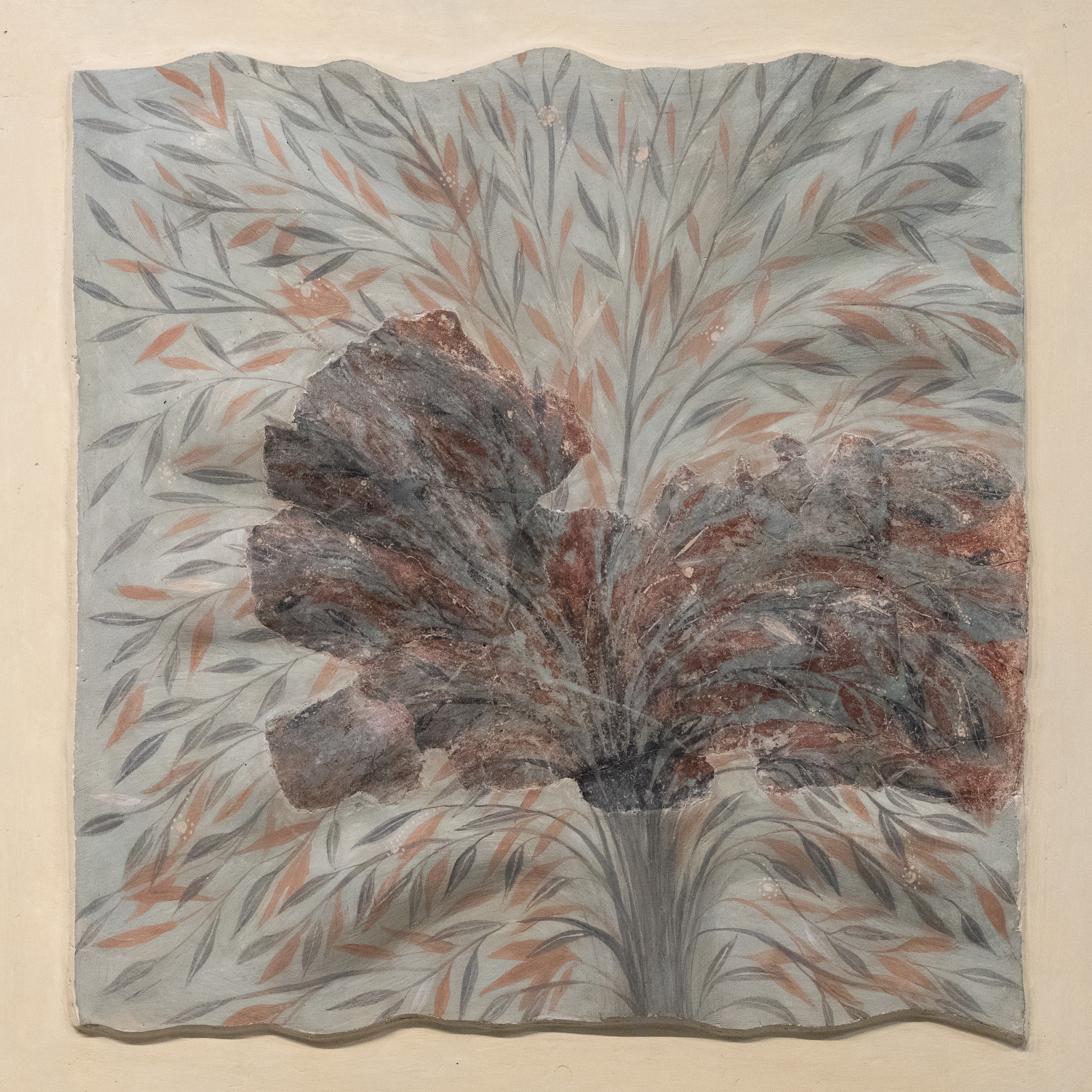
Knossos olive tree fresco

== Sculpture ==
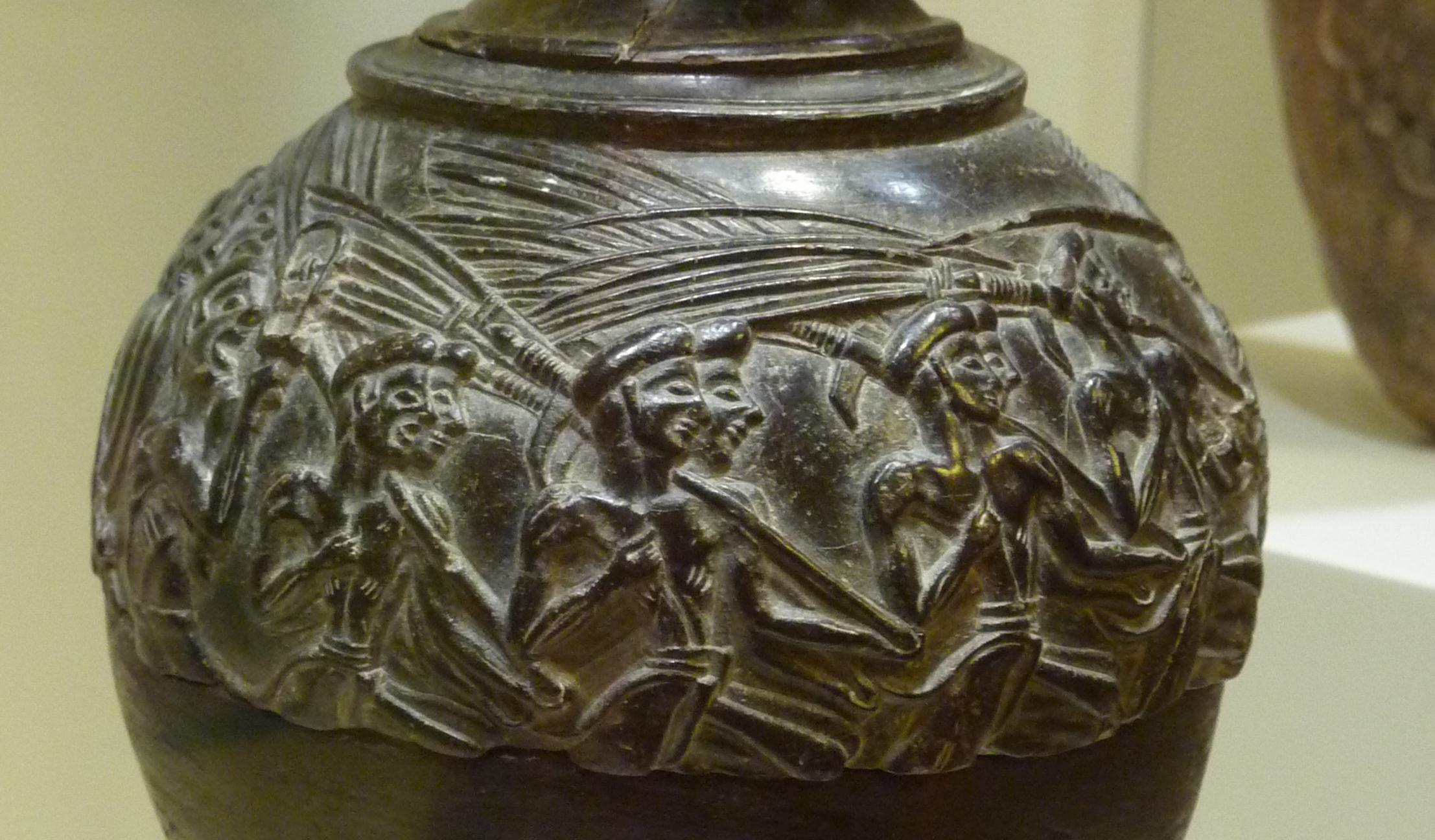
The (incomplete) "Harvester Vase", soapstone, LM I.

Minoan large stone sculptures are very rare, in notable contrast to the contemporary mainland cultures, and later Ancient Greek art. However, this may partly be explained by the lack of suitable stone, as there are smaller sculptures and some "evidence for the existence of large wooden and even metal statues in Crete", which may well have been acrolithic and brightly painted.

The Palaikastro Kouros is an all but unique find of a chryselephantine statuette of a male (kouros) that may have been a cult image. The body is made of hippopotamus tooth covered with gold foil, the head of serpentine stone with rock crystal eyes and ivory details. Standing roughly 50 cm (19.5 in) talI, it was deliberately smashed when the city was pillaged in the LM period, and has been reconstructed from many tiny pieces.

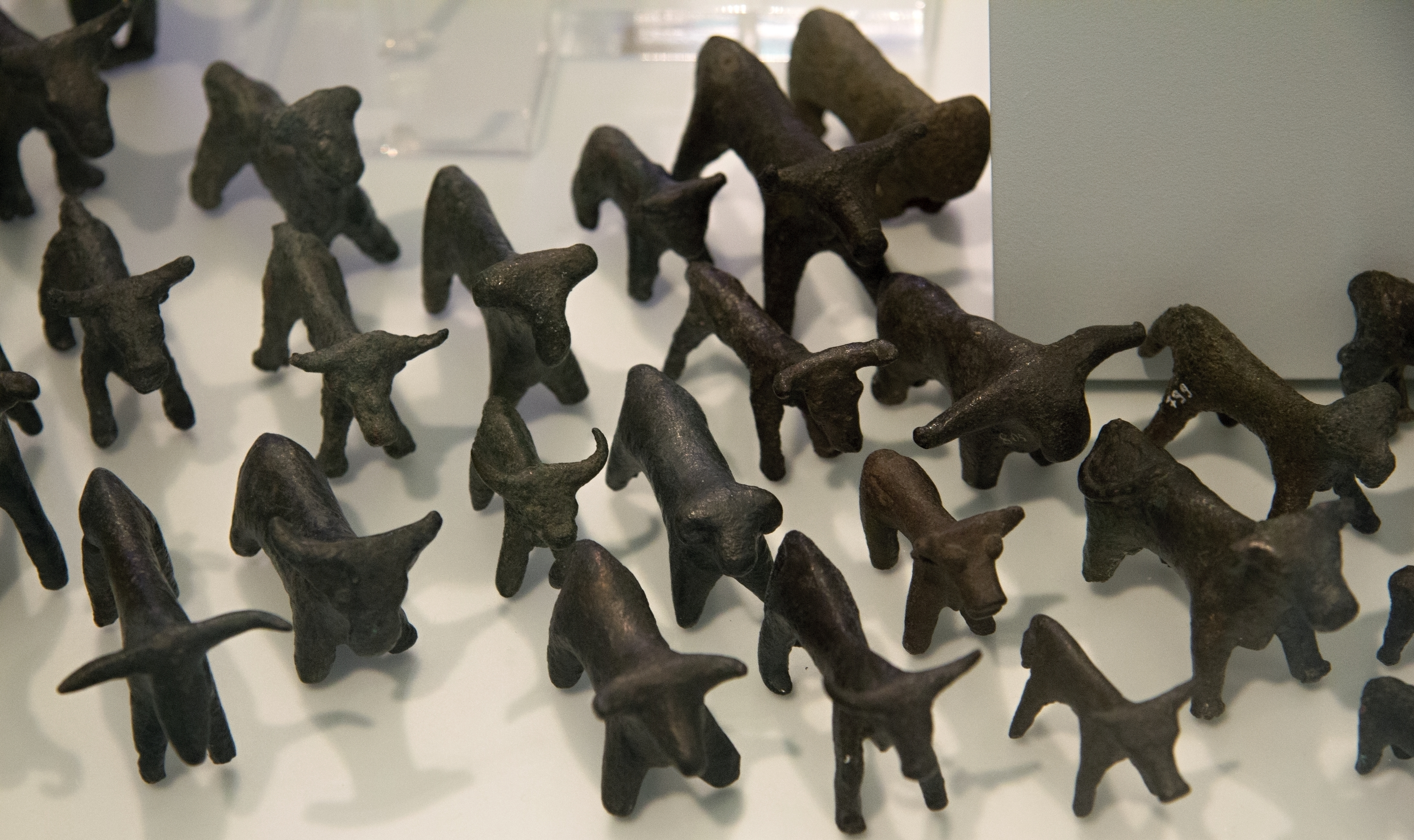
Small bronze votive offerings of bulls, Postpalatial, AMH

Small sculpture of a number of types was often very finely made. Stone vases, often highly decorated in relief or by incision, were a type made before the Bronze Age in Egypt and the Greek mainland, and they appear in Crete, mostly in burials or palace settings, from Early Minoan II onwards. Many were perhaps made specially to be grave goods.

The most elaborate palace vases are rhyta, probably for libations, some shaped into sculptural forms such as animal heads or seashells, others carved with geometrical patterns or figurative scenes round the sides. They are mostly too large and heavy for convenient use in feasting, and many have holes at the bottom for pouring libations. Most use soft or semiprecious stones such as steatite or serpentine.

A number of these are of special interest to archaeologists because they include relatively detailed scenes touching on areas of Minoan life that remain mysterious, and are otherwise mostly only seen on tiny seals; for example, the "Chieftain Cup" from Hagia Triada may (or may not) be the most detailed representation of a Minoan ruler, the "Harvester Vase" from the same site probably shows an agricultural festival, and a vase from Zagros shows a peak sanctuary.

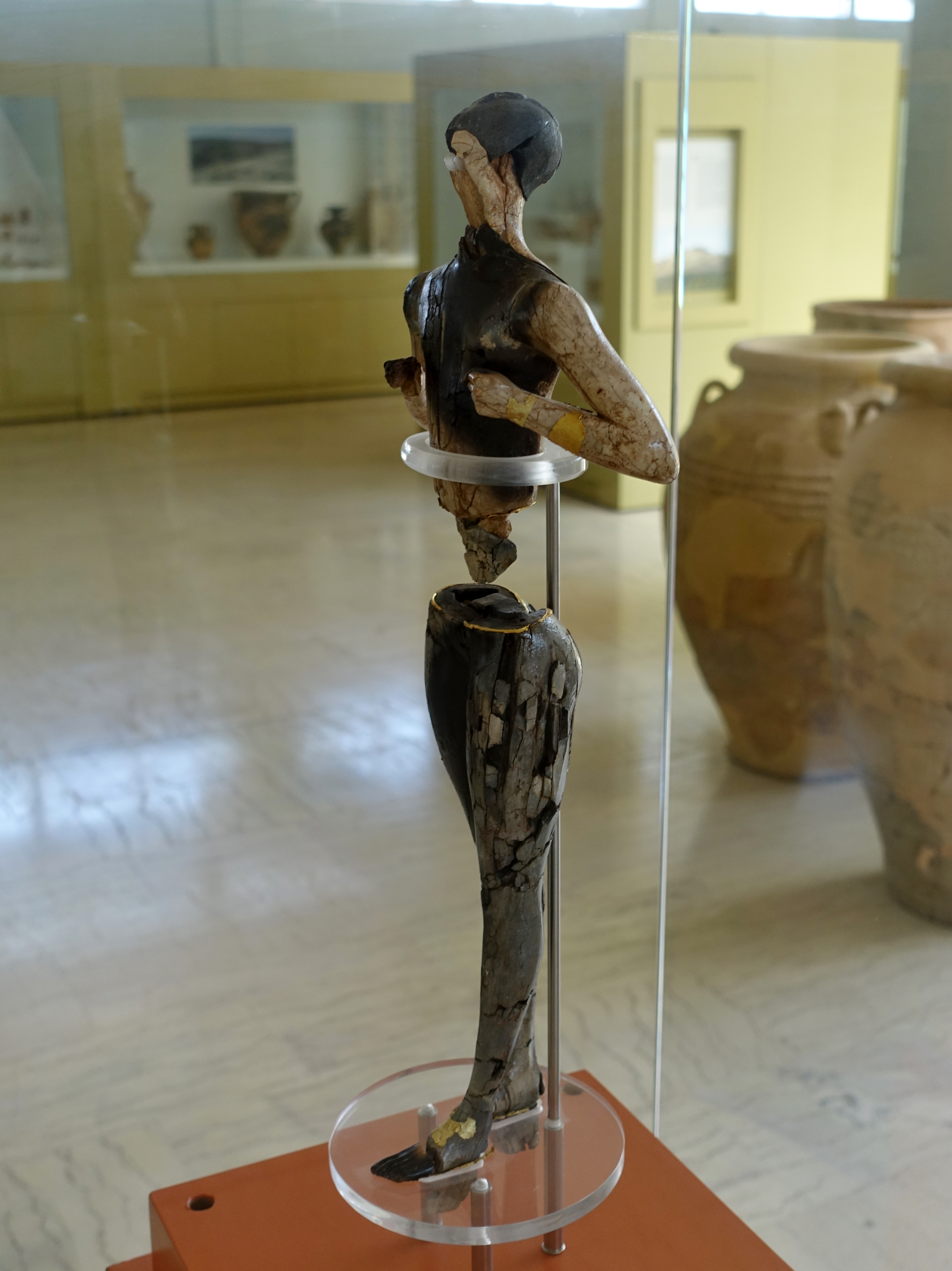
The Palaikastro Kouros, the only Minoan cult image from a shrine to survive

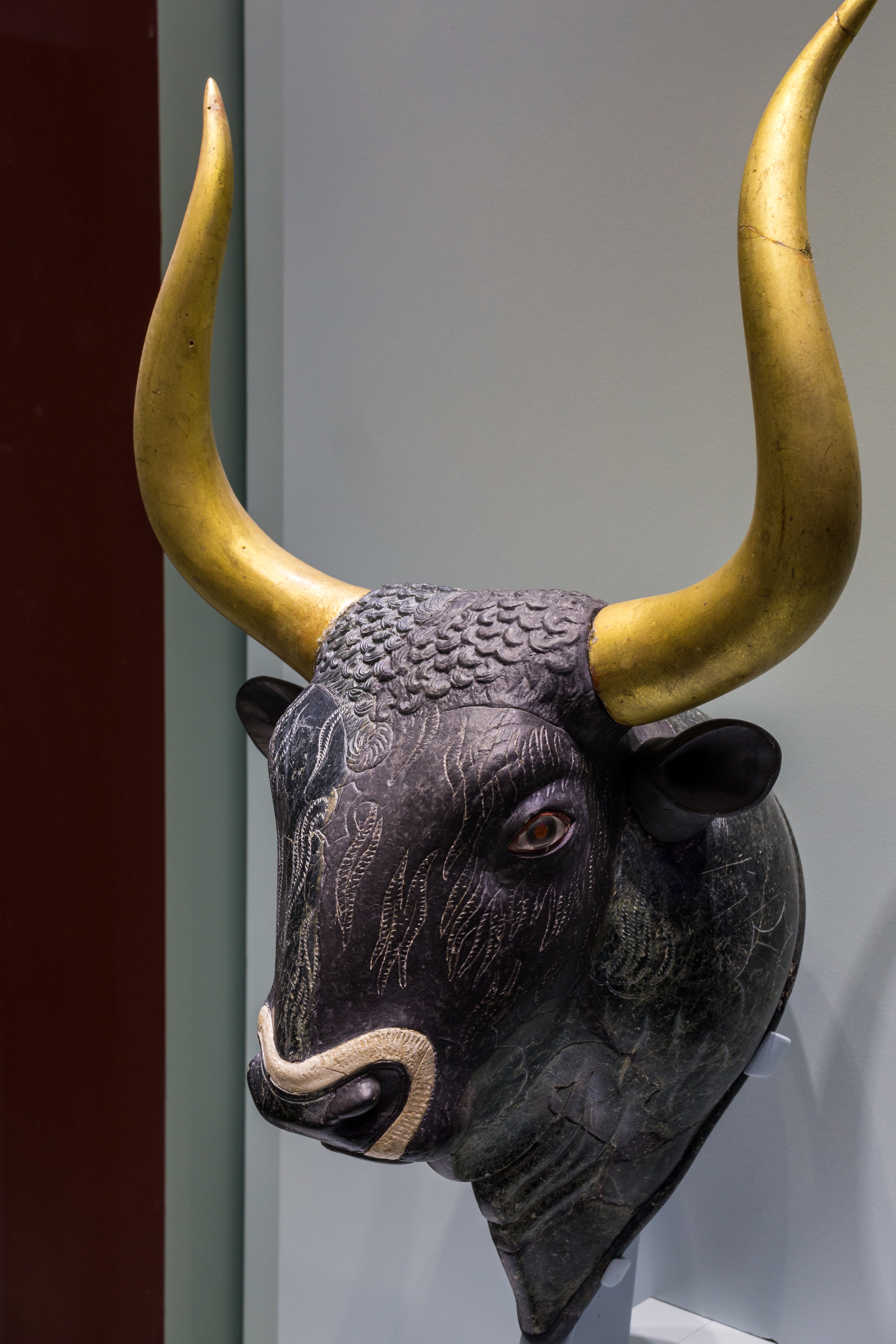
Stone rhyton in the form of a bulls head, Knossos, LM I or II. The gilt-wood horns are modern.

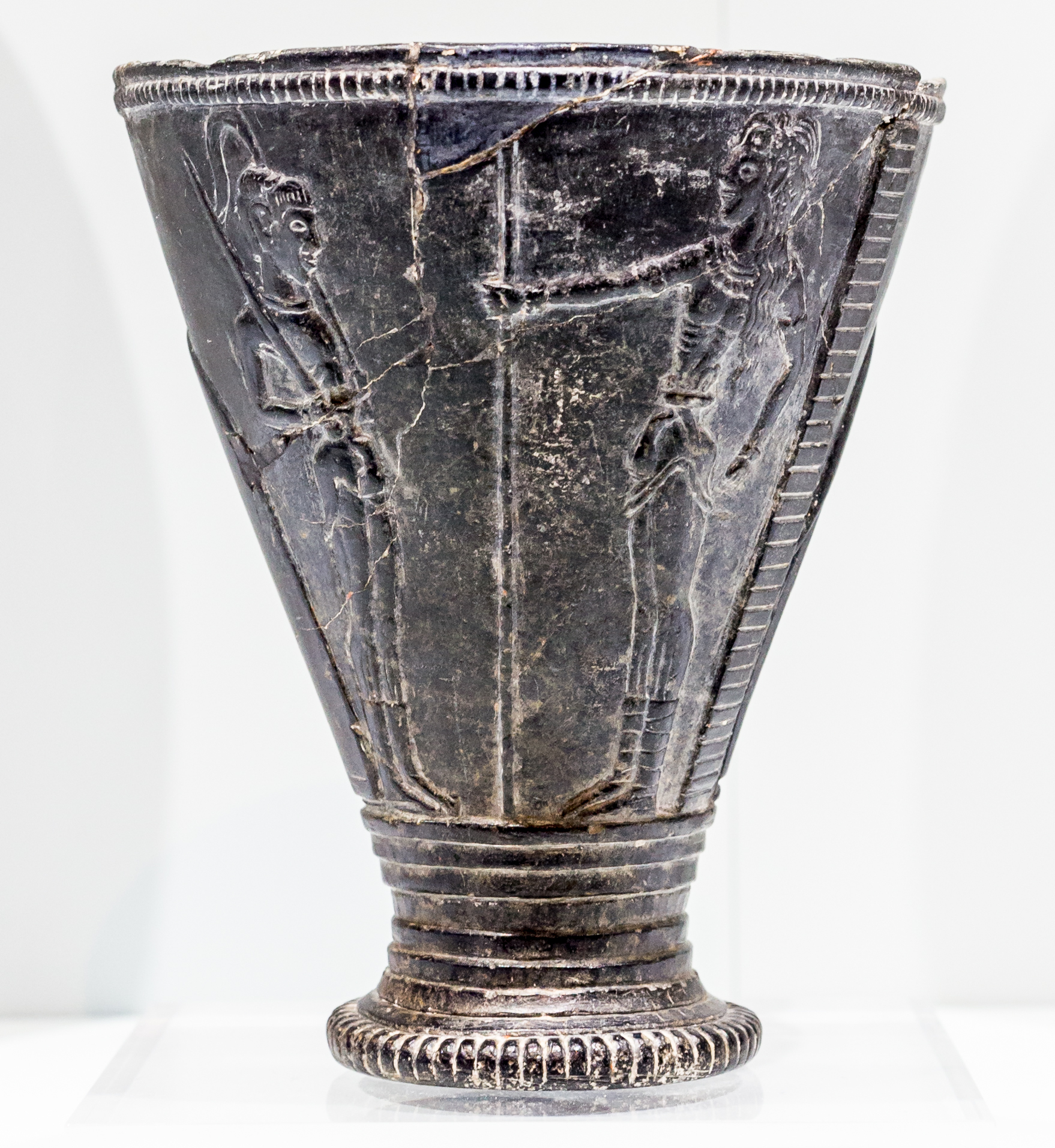
The stone "Chieftain Cup" from Hagia Triada, MM III or LM I.

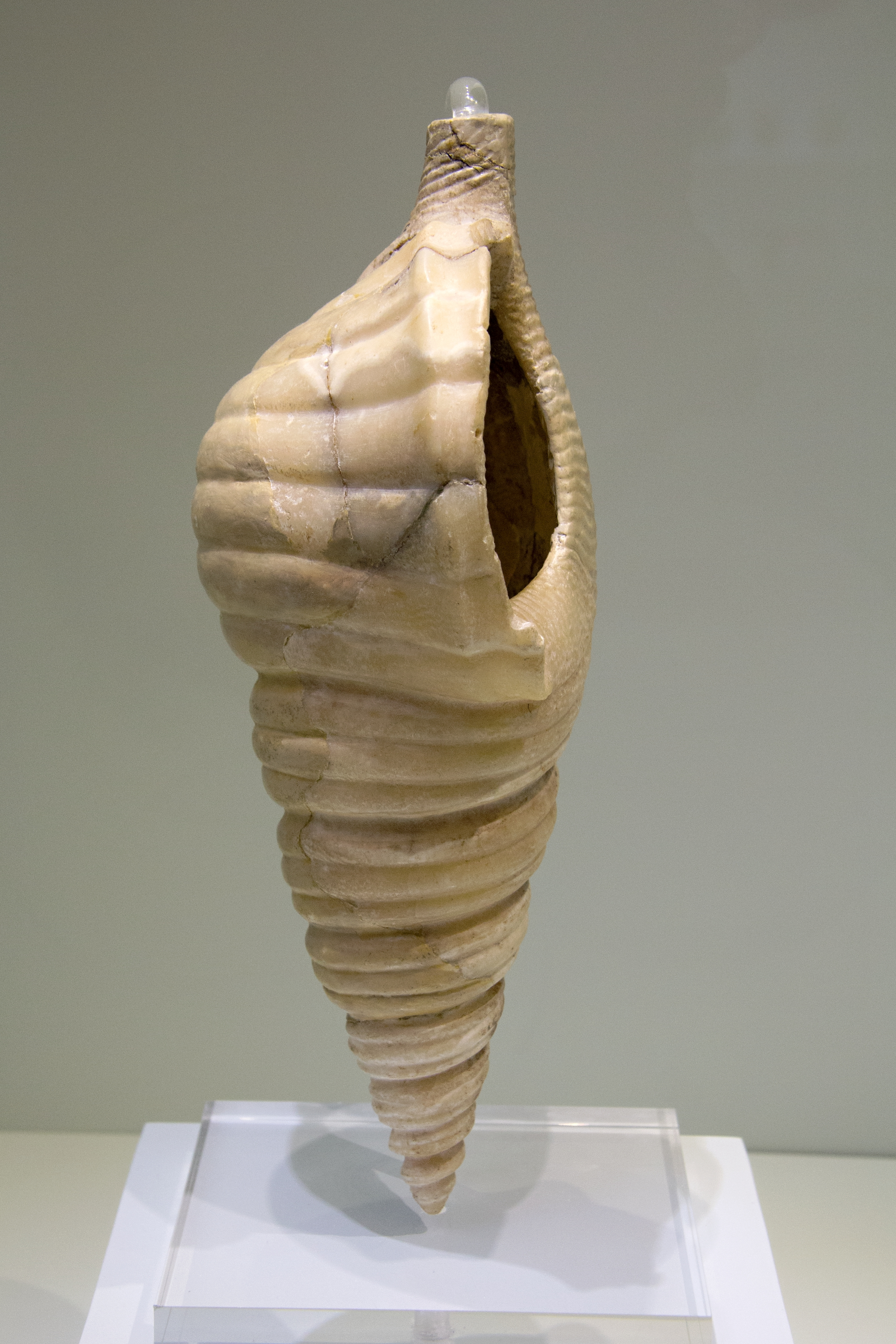
Alabaster triton shell-shaped rhyton, Knossos, 1650-1550 BC, AMH

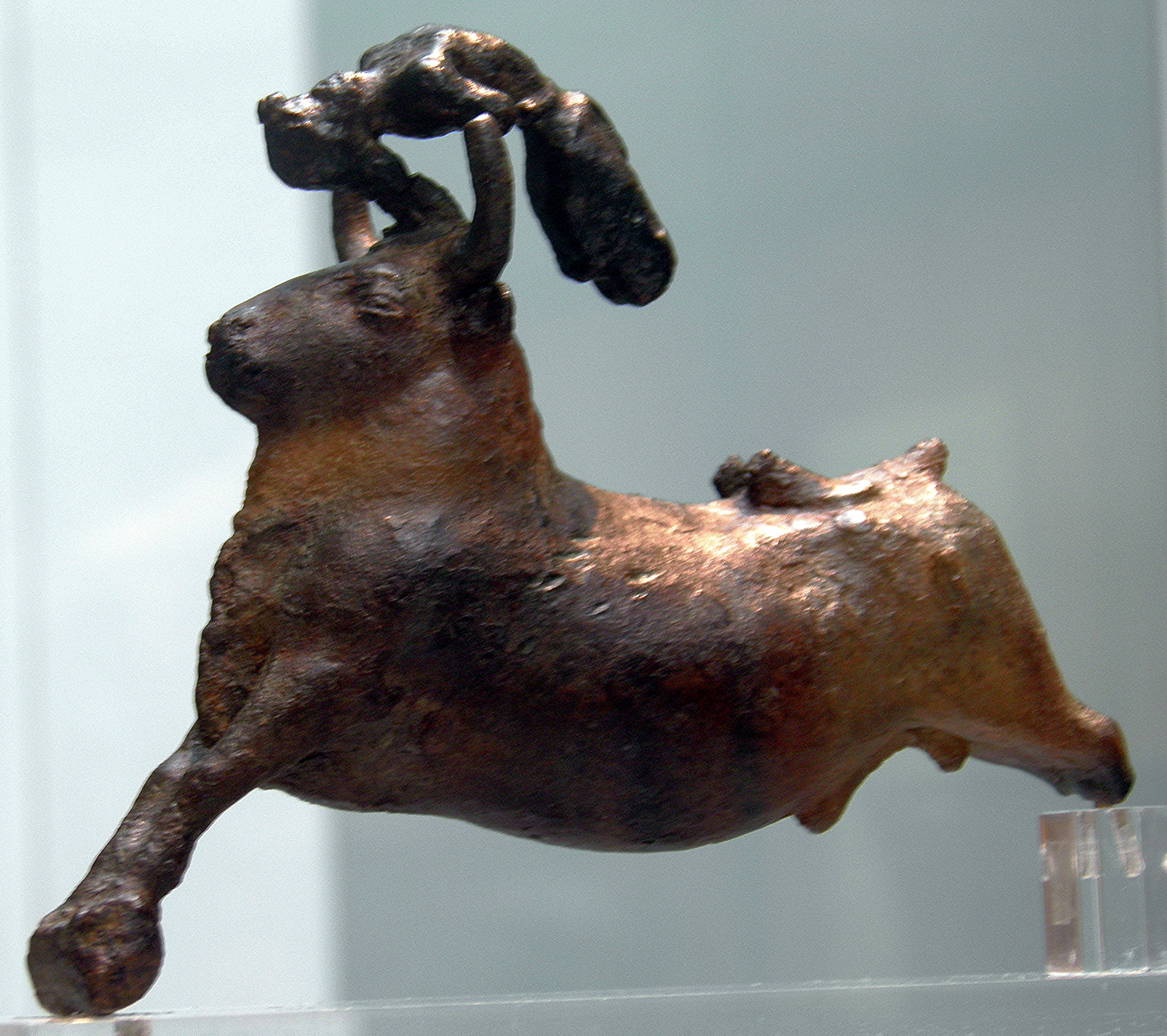
Bronze bull-leaper group in the British Museum

Minoan seals are the most common surviving type of art after pottery, with several thousand known, from EM II onwards, in addition to over a thousand impressions, few of which match surviving seals. Cylinder seals are common in early periods, much less so later. Probably many early examples were in wood, and have not survived. Ivory and soft stone were the main surviving materials for early seals, the body of which were quite often formed as animals or birds.

Later, some are extremely fine engraved gems; other seals are in gold. The subjects shown cover, indeed extend, the full range of Minoan art. The so-called Theseus Ring was found in Athens; it is gold, with a bull-leaping scene in intaglio on the flat bezel. The Pylos Combat Agate is an exceptionally fine engraved gem, probably made in the Late Minoan, but found in a Mycenean context.

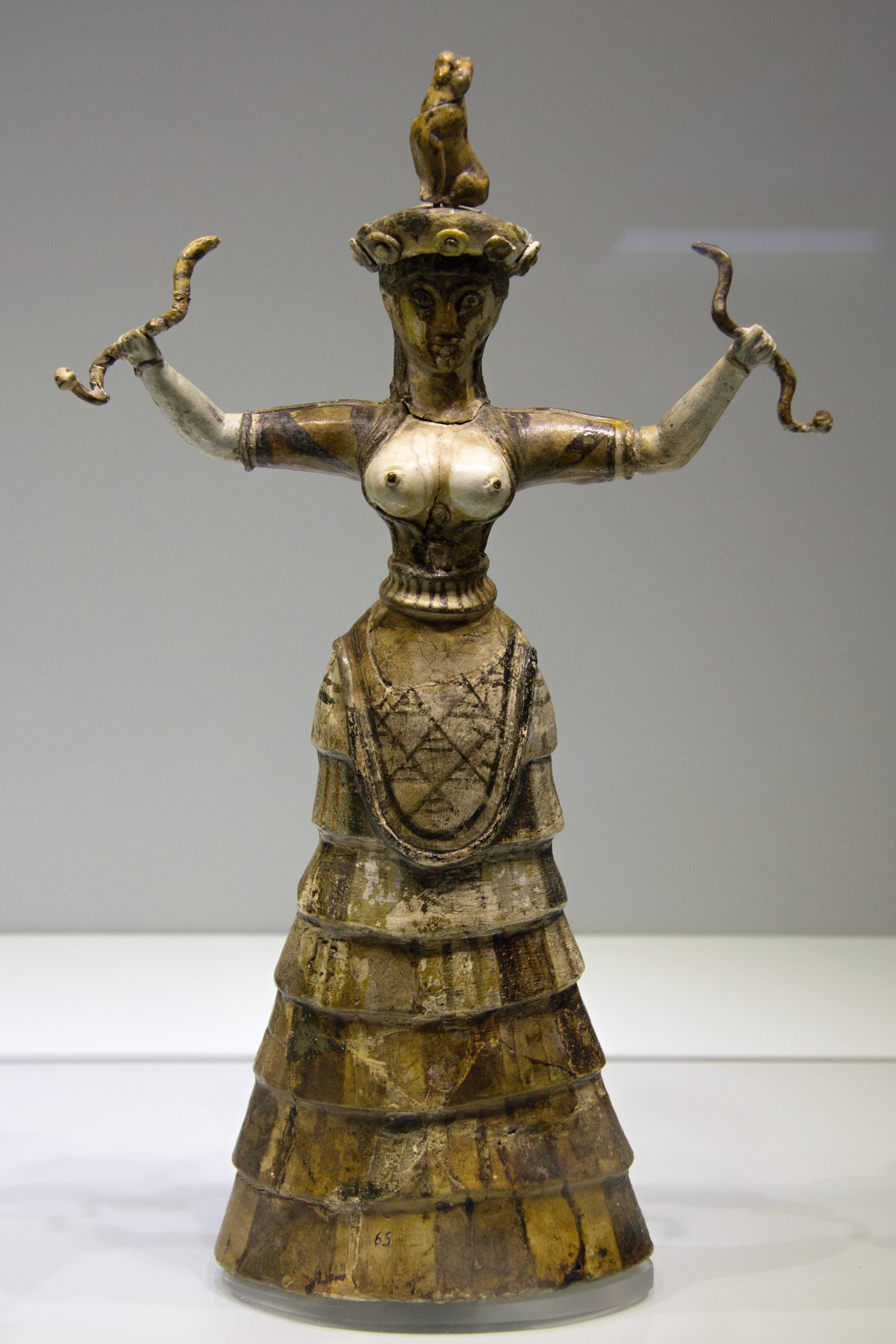
"Snake Goddess" figurine, Knossos, 1650-1550 BC, AMH, Egyptian faience.

Small ceramic sculptures were very common, mostly in the same earthenware (known as terracotta when used in sculpture) as Minoan pottery, but also in the heated crushed quartz material known as Egyptian faience, evidently a more expensive material. This was used for the unique snake goddess figurines from the "Temple Depostories" at Knossos, where the largest group of Aegean faience objects were found.

Basic terracotta figures were often hand-formed and unpainted, but fancier ones were made on the wheel and decorated. Vast numbers, of both human and animal figures, were made as votive offerings, as all over the Near East, and have been found in the sacred caves of Crete and peak sanctuaries. The poppy goddess type, with a round vessel-like "skirt", and two raised hands, and attributes rising from the diadem, a late one Minoan example. Some human figures are quite large, and also painted clay animals, up to the size of a large dog, used as votive substitutes for animal sacrifices; there is a group from Hagia Triada which includes some human-headed types. The Hagia Triada sarcophagus shows two model animals being carried to an altar, as part of funeral rites.

The few bronze figurines were probably only made from MM III onwards. They are regarded as votives mostly representing worshipers, but also various animals, and in the Ashmolean Museum a crawling baby. Despite the trouble required to make solid bronze figures with lost wax casting, their surfaces are not finished after casting, giving them what Stuart Hood calls a "Rodinesque look resulting from this neglect of finish". Many also have casting defects in places; for example the famous and impressive bull-leaper group in the British Museum seems to have lacked or lost some of the thinner extremities (in part now restored).

Other small sculptures, many in relief, are in ivory and tooth from various animals, bone, and seashell. Wood has very rarely survived, but was no doubt very commonly. North Syria had elephants throughout the period, and imported ivory from there or Africa seems to have been readily available for elite art; uncarved tusks were found in the palace at Zagros destroyed c. 1450. A large (96.5 x 55.3 cm) gold-plated ivory gaming board (or perhaps just the lid) richly decorated with carving and inlays from Knossos has lost the wood that probably formed most of the original, but is the most complete survival of the lavish decoration of palace furniture in later periods, which compares with examples from Egypt and the Near East. Many plaques and pieces of inlay in ivory and various materials have survived without their settings, some carved in high relief.

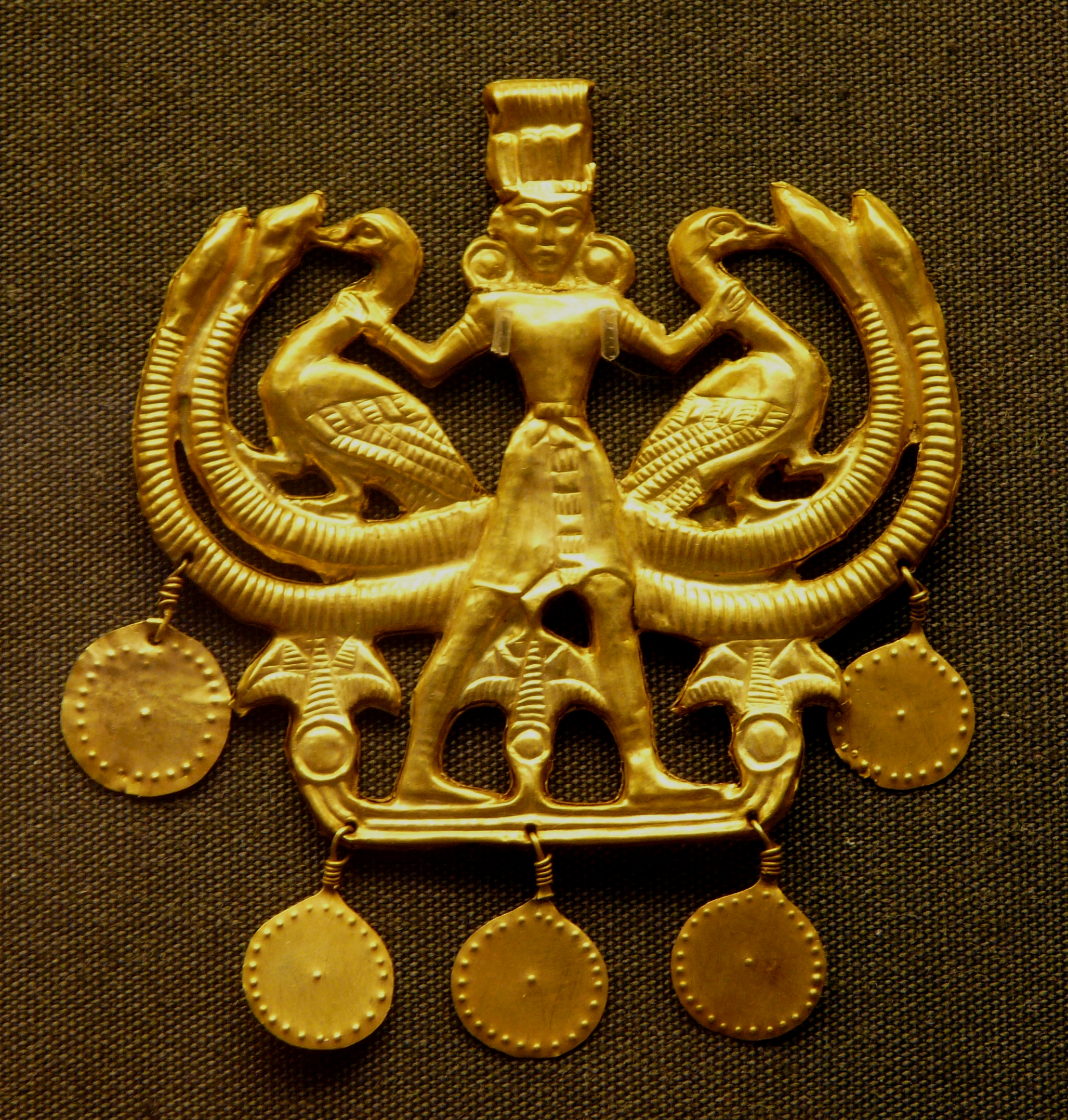
The "Master of Animals Pendant", Aegina Treasure, British Museum.

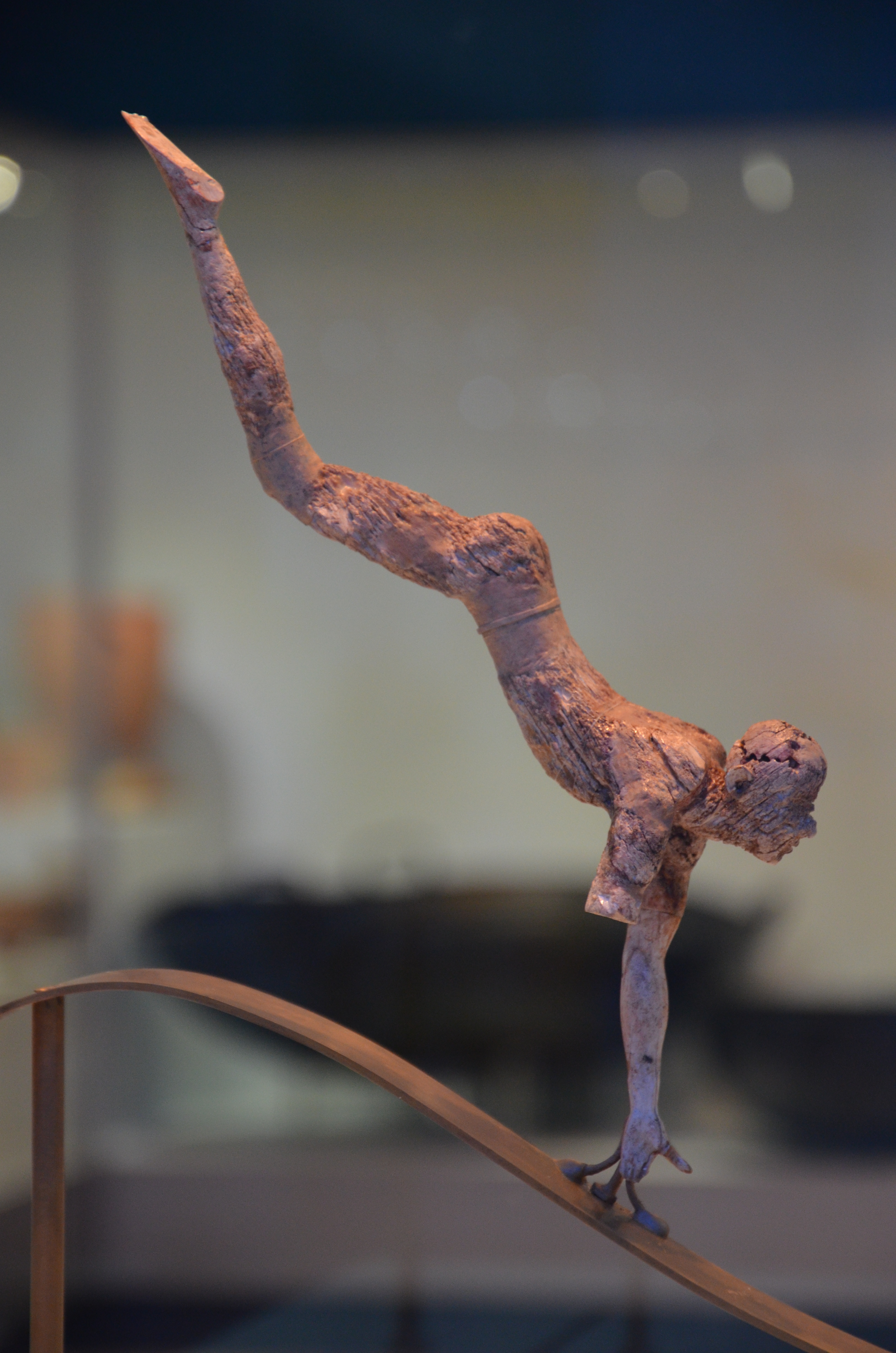
Ivory bull-leaper, "Ivory Deposit" at Knossos, prob. MM IIIB, AMH.

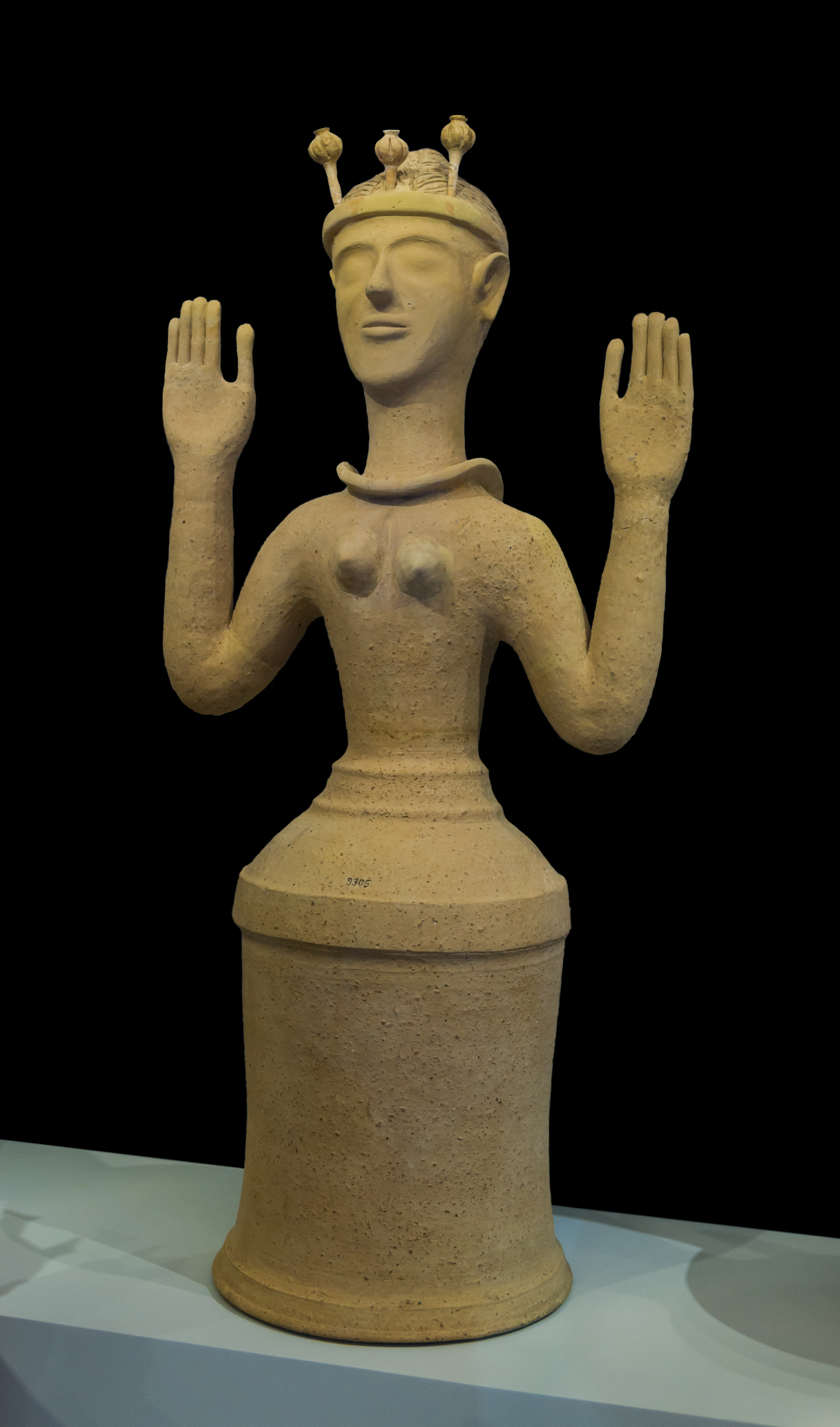
Terracotta Poppy goddess figurine, AMH

== Pottery ==
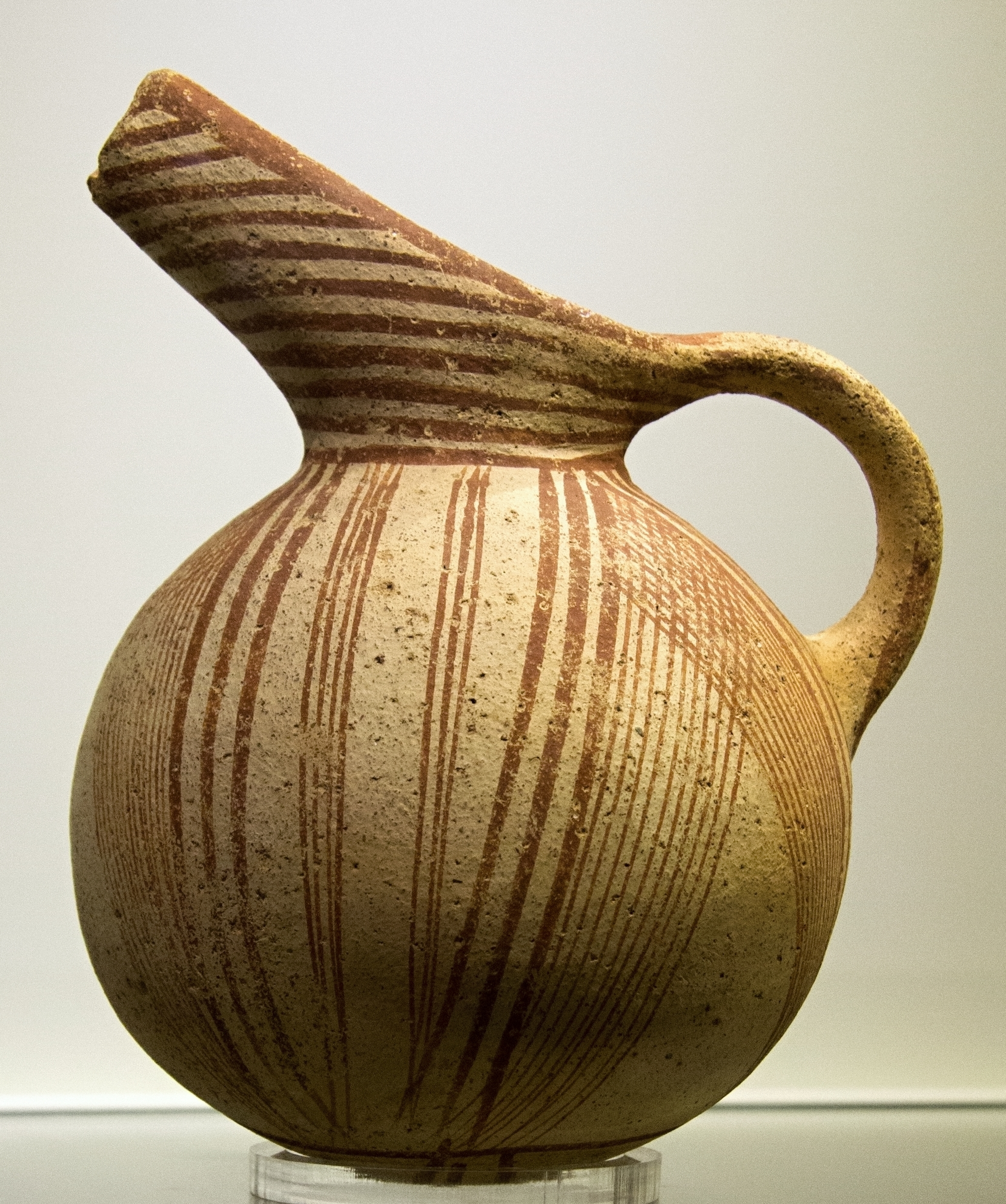
Aghious Onouphrios ware, EM I, AMH

Many different styles of potted wares and techniques of production are observable throughout the history of Crete. Early Minoan ceramics (terracotta sculptures are covered above) were characterized by patterns of spirals, triangles, curved lines, crosses, fish bones, and beak-spouts. However, while many of the artistic motifs are similar in the Early Minoan period, there are many differences that appear in the reproduction of these techniques throughout the island which represent a variety of shifts in taste as well as in power structures.

During the Middle Minoan period, naturalistic designs (such as fish, squid, birds and lilies) were common. In the Late Minoan period, flowers and animals were still characteristic but more variety existed. However, in contrast to later Ancient Greek vase painting, paintings of human figures are extremely rare, and those of land mammals not common until late periods. Shapes and ornament were often borrowed from metal tableware that has largely not survived, while painted decoration probably mostly derives from frescos.

=== EM I Wares ===
One of the earliest styles in EM I was the Coarse Dark Burnished class. The dark burnished class most closely mimics the techniques of the Neolithic era. After new techniques allowed for the development of new styles of pottery in the early Bronze Age, Coarse Dark Burnished class remained in production, and while most wares from the Coarse Dark Burnished class are generally less extravagant than other styles that utilize the technological developments that emerged during EM I, some examples of intricate pieces exist. This may suggest that there was a desire within the communities who produced Coarse Dark Burnished ware to separate themselves from the communities who produced wares with the new techniques.

The Aghious Onouphrios and the Lebena classes were two of the most widespread styles of pottery that used techniques of which there are no antecedent examples. Both techniques utilized a variety of new techniques, for example the selection and handling of materials, the firing process, sapping and ornamentation. Both styles used fine patterns of lines to ornament the vessels. In the case of Aghious Onouphrios, vessel had a white backing and were painted with red lining. Conversely, in the case of the Lebena style white lines were painted above a red background.

Another EM I class was Pirgos ware. The style may have been imported, and perhaps mimics wood. Pirgos wares utilize a combination of old and new techniques. Pirgos wares are a subdivision of the Fine Dark Burnished class that have characteristic burnished patterns. The patterning is likely due to an inability to effectively paint the styles' dark background.

These three classes of EM I pottery adequately reveal the diversity of techniques that emerged during the period. The Coarse Dark Burnished class continued to use techniques that were already in use, the Aghious Onouphrios and Lebana class used completely new techniques, and the Fine Dark Burnished class used a combination of old and new techniques. However a variety of other EM I wares have been discovered, e.g. the Scored, Red to Brown Monochrome, and the Cycladic classes. Additionally, all of the classes utilized different shapes of pottery.

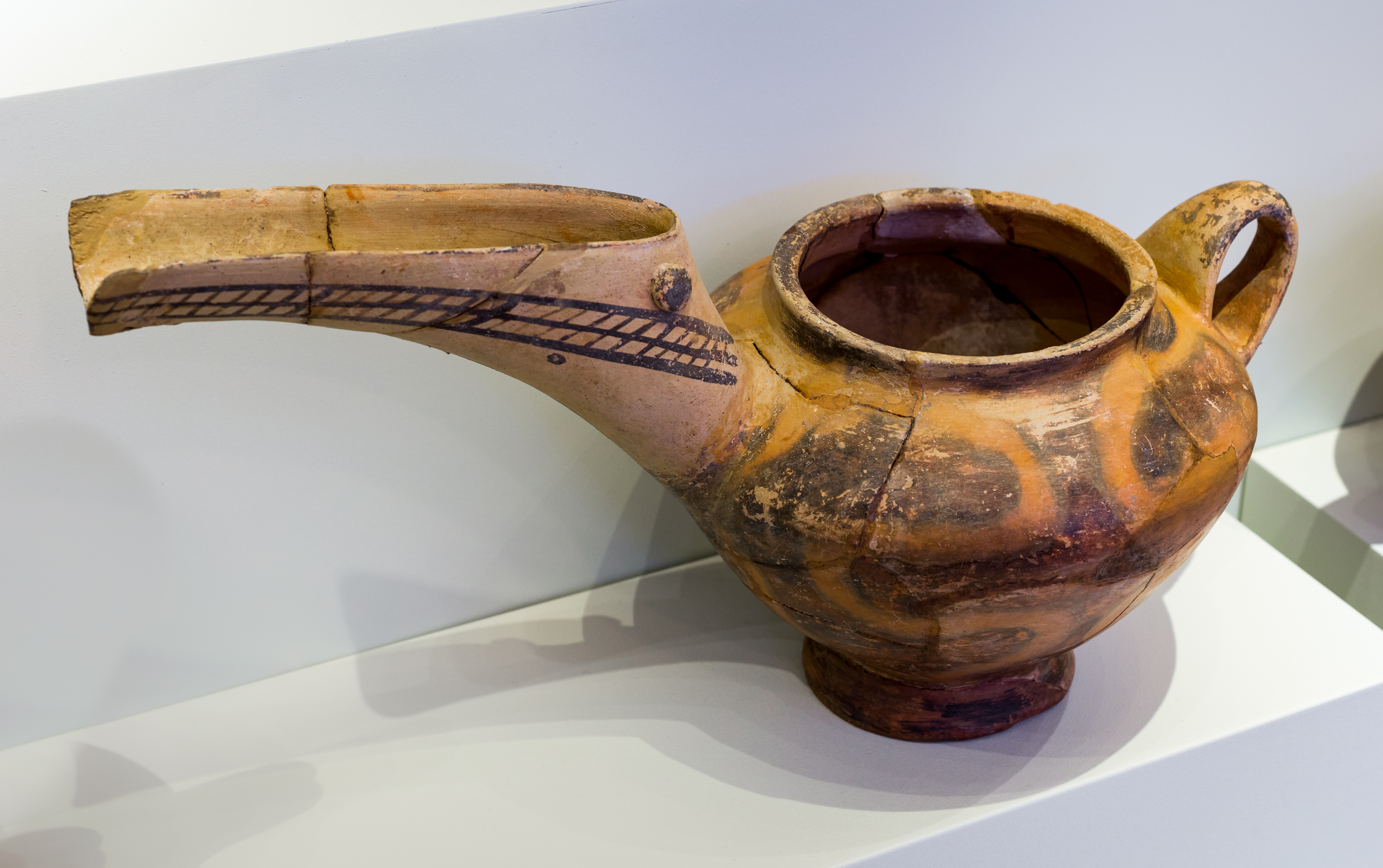
Vasiliki Ware in the characteristic "teapot" shape, vasiliki, EM IIB, AMH

=== EM II-III Wares ===
In the first phase of Early Minoan, the Aghious Onouphrios ware is most common. Vasiliki ware is found in East Crete during the EM IIA period, but it is in the next period, EM IIB, that it becomes the dominant form among the fine wares throughout eastern and southern Crete. Both styles contain a reddish wash. However, Vasiliki ware has a unique mottled finish that distinguishes it from the EM I styles pottery. At times this mottled finish is deliberate and controlled and at others it seems uncontrolled. Like EM I, a variety classifications of Pottery emerged during this period. Koumasa ware is a development of Aghious and Lebana styles of pottery and was prominent in EM IIA, prior to Vasiliki wares' increased popularity. Additionally, gray wares continued to be produced throughout EM II and a Fine Gray class of wares emerges. The Fine Gray class follows the trend of the majority of EM II pottery and is a remarkably higher quality than previous wares.

EM III, the final phase of the early Minoan period, is dominated by the White-On-Dark class. Some locations have been discovered that housed over 90% White-On-Dark ware. The class utilizes complex spirals and other ornate patterning that have naturalistic appearances. But not all producers of these wares used these patterns at the same time. Rather, the motifs caught hold over an extended period of time. These developments set the mood for the new classes that would emerge in the Middle Minoan period.

EM II-III are marked by a refining of the techniques and styles of pottery that emerged and evolved during EM I and these refinements would ultimately set the themes for the later works of Minoan and Mycenaean pottery.

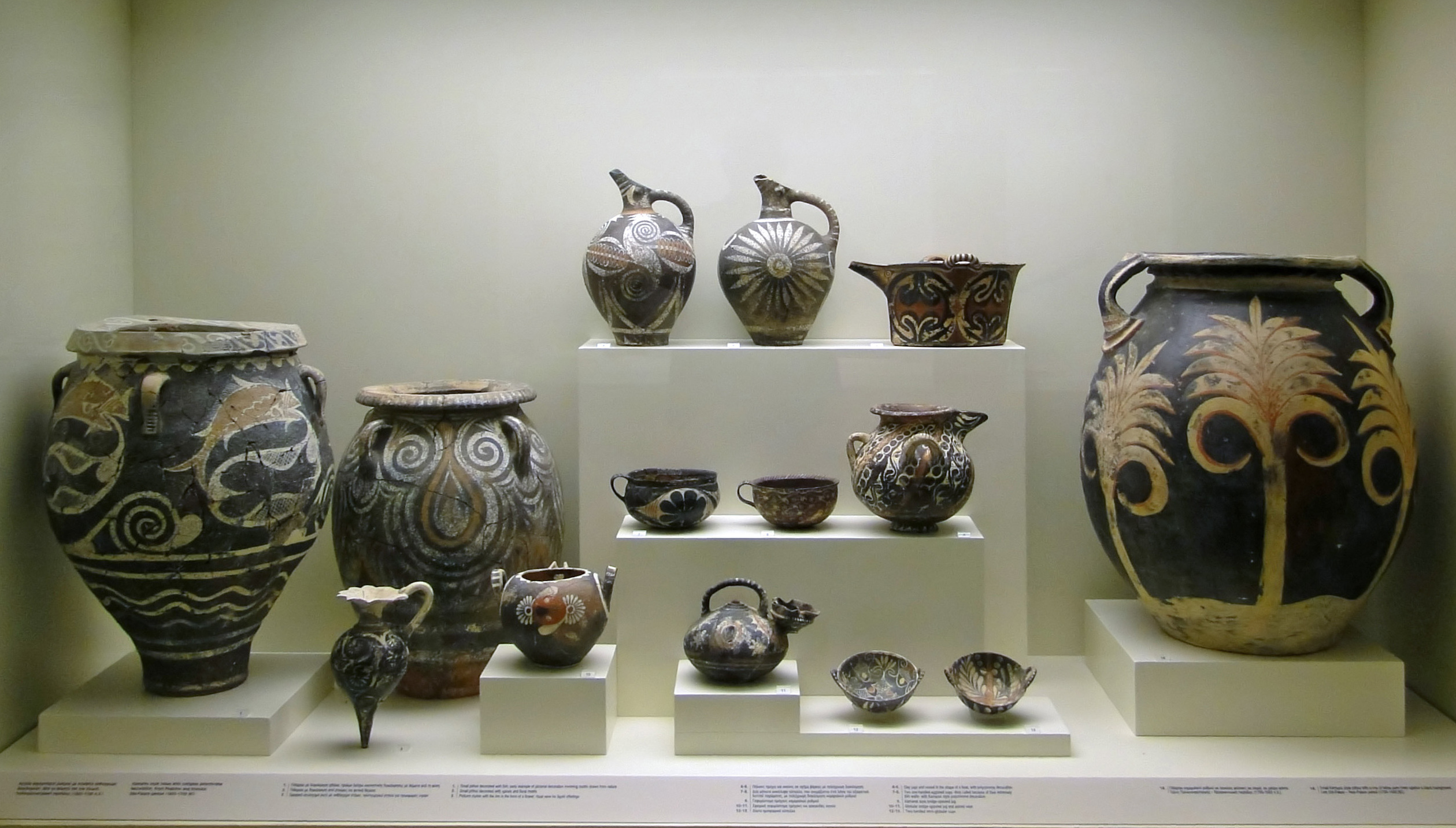
Kamares vases in Heraklion Archaeological Museum, Crete

=== MM Wares ===
Pottery became more common with the building of the palaces and the potter's wheel. Kamares ware is most typical of this period. The MM period was dominated by the development of monumental palaces. These places centralized the production of potted wares. This centralization led artists to become more aware of what other craftsmen were producing and wares became more homogeneous in shapes in styles.

While the pottery became more homogeneous in style during MM, the wares did not become any less ornate. Indeed, during the MM period the most elaborate decorations of any previous period emerge. These designs were likely inspired by the fresco that emerged during the palatial era. The Kamares ware that came to dominated the period utilized flower, fish, and other naturalistic ornamentation, and although the White-On-Gray class had begun to articulate prototypes of these patterns in EM III, the new decorative techniques of this period have no parallel.

From about MM IIIA the quality of decorated palace pottery begins to decline, perhaps indicating that it was being replaced by precious metal on the dining tables and altars of the elite.

=== LM Wares ===
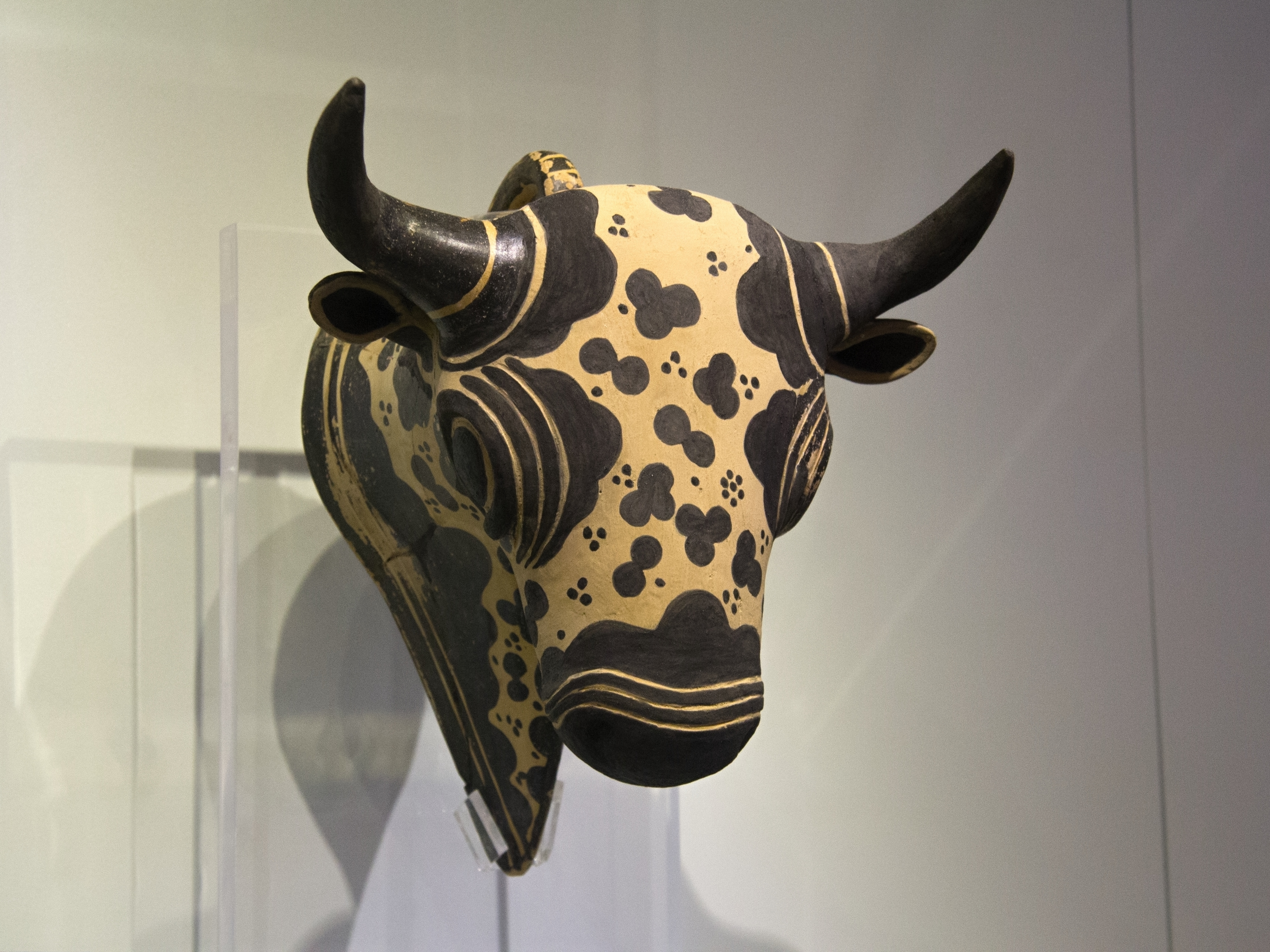
Bull's head rhyton, painted terracotta

The Palace Style of the region around Knossos is characterized by geometric simplicity and monochromatic painting. LM wares continued the extravagance of decoration that became popular during the MM period. The patterns and images that were used to decorate pottery became more detailed and more varied. The Floral Style, Marine Style, Abstract Geometric and the Alternating styles of decoration were prominent themes of this era. Additionally, potted wares that depicted animals, e.g. the heads of bulls, became popular during LM. These decorative pieces were painted with the popular patterns of the time creating some of the most elaborate of all Minoan potted goods. Dark on light painting took over from light on dark by the end of LM IB.

LM pottery achieved the full articulation of the themes and techniques that had existed since the Neolithic era. Yet, this articulation was not the product of linear development. Rather, it was produced through the dynamic exchange of ideas and techniques and will to break away from, as well as to conform to, previous molds of production. Late Minoan art in turn influenced that of Mycenae, and saw reciprocal influence, both in the subjects used in decoration, and in new vessel shapes. Minoan knowledge of the sea was continued by the Mycenaeans in their frequent use of marine forms as artistic motifs. The so-called Marine Style, inspired by frescoes, has the entire surface of a pot covered with sea creatures, octopus, fish and dolphins, against a background of rocks, seaweed and sponges. By LM2 the painting was losing its "life and movement", and figurative painting was confined to a framed band around the vessel body.

== Jewellery ==
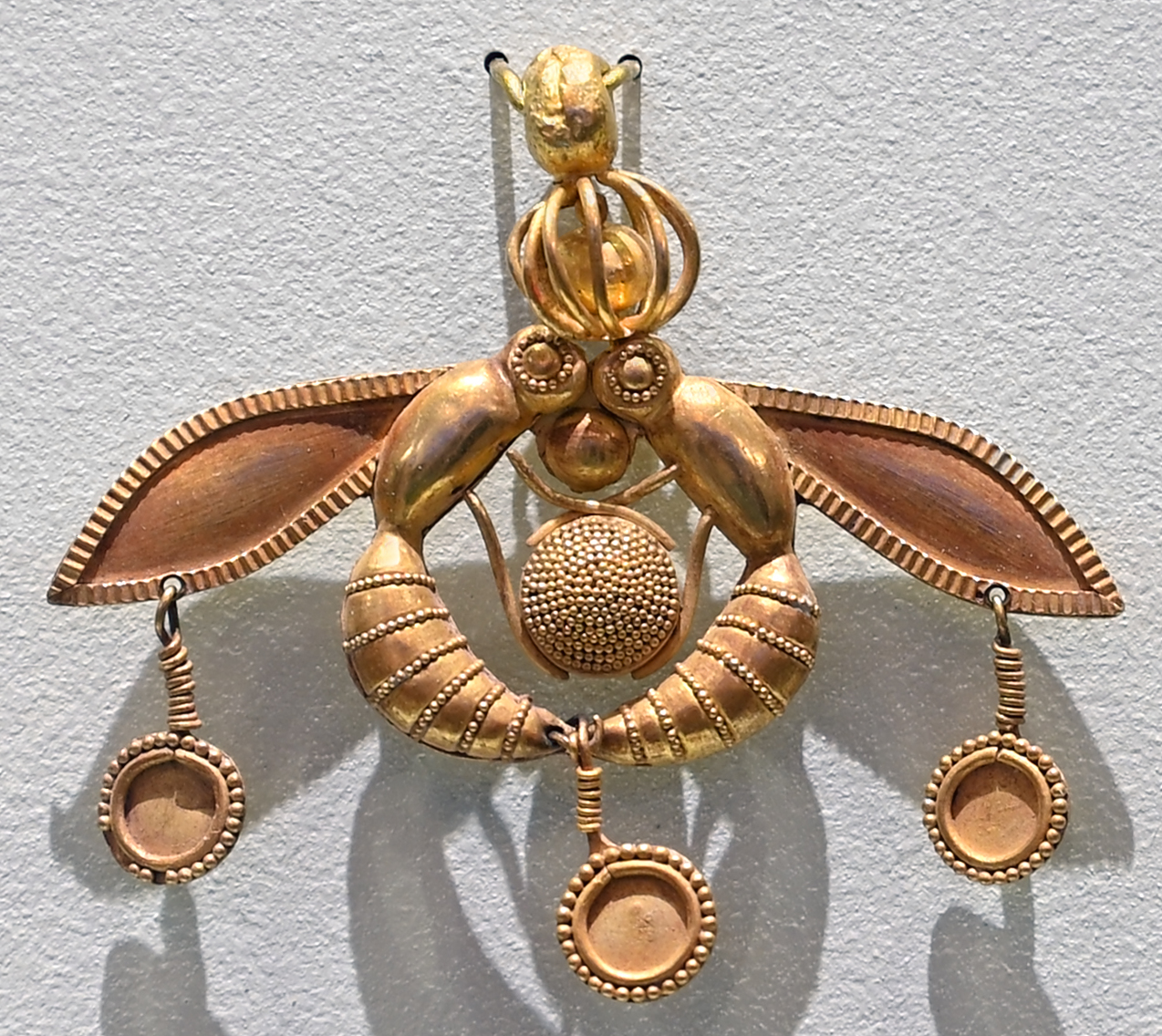
The gold Malia Pendant with bees, MM IIA or IIIA, AMH.

Minoan jewellery has mostly been recovered from graves, and until the later periods much of it consists of diadems and ornaments for women's hair, though there are also the universal types of rings, bracelets, armlets and necklaces, and many thin pieces that were sewn onto clothing. In the earlier periods gold was the main material, typically hammered very thin. but later it seemed to become scarce.

The Minoans created elaborate metalwork with imported gold and copper. Bead necklaces, bracelets and hair ornaments appear in the frescoes, and many labrys pins survive. The Minoans mastered granulation, as indicated by the Malia Pendant, a gold pendant featuring bees on a honeycomb. This was overlooked by the 19th-century looters of a royal burial site they called the "Gold Hole" (Chryssolakkos).

Fine chains were made from EM times, and much used. Minoan jewellers used stamps, moulds (some stone examples survive), and before long "hard soldering" to bond gold to itself without melting it, requiring precise control of temperature. Cloisonné was used, initially with shaped gems, but later vitreous enamel.

Apart from the large collection in the AMH, the Aegina Treasure is an important group in the British Museum, of uncertain origin though supposedly found c. 1890 on the Greek island of Aegina near Athens, but regarded as Cretan work from MM III to LM.

Figurative work on Minoan seals, gold rings and other jewels was often extremely fine; it is covered under sculpture above.

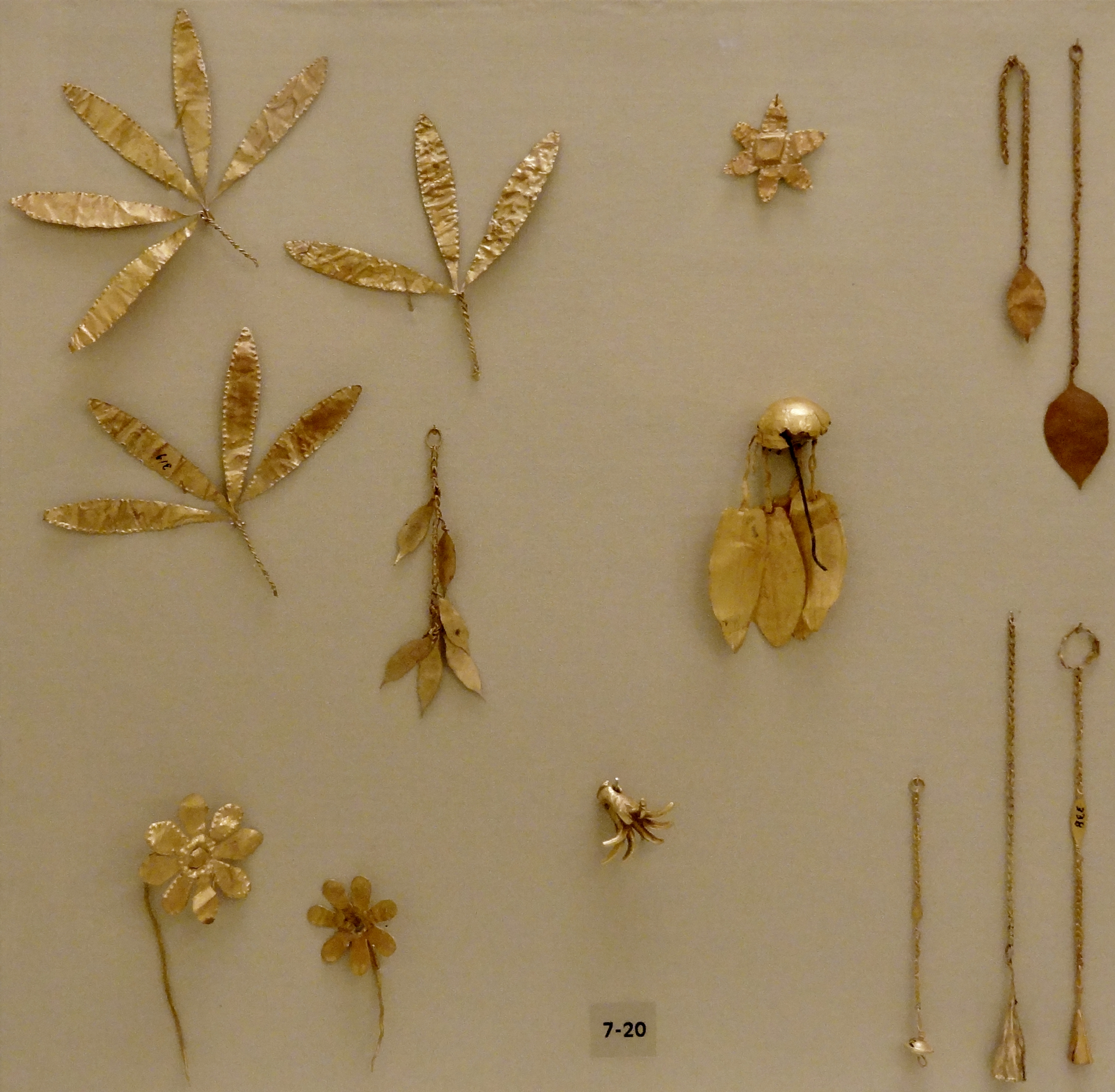
EM pieces from graves at Moclos, AMH

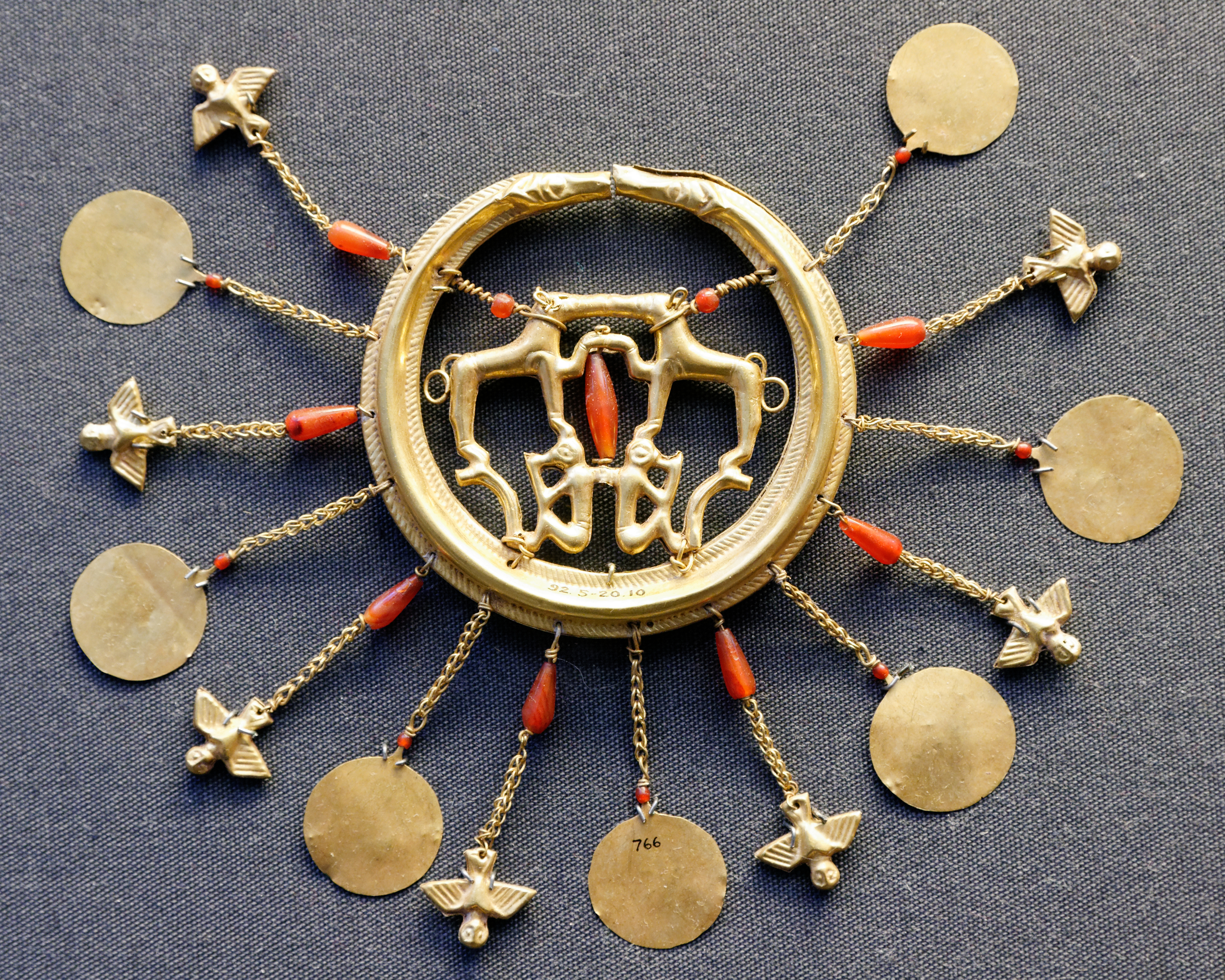
MM III gold earring with dogs, monkeys and birds, Aegina Treasure, British Museum

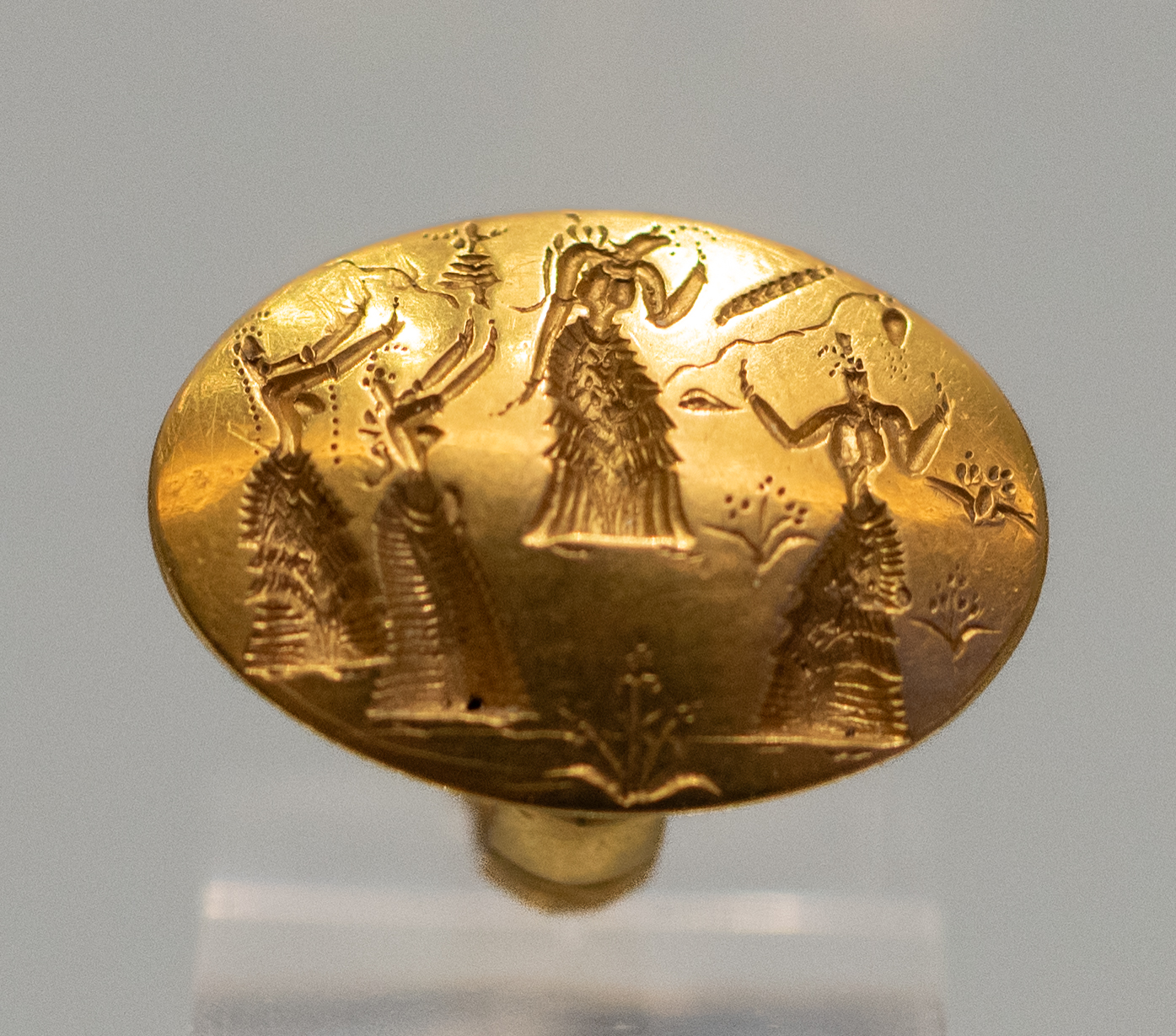
Women dancing. Knossos, Isopata, 1500–1450 BC.

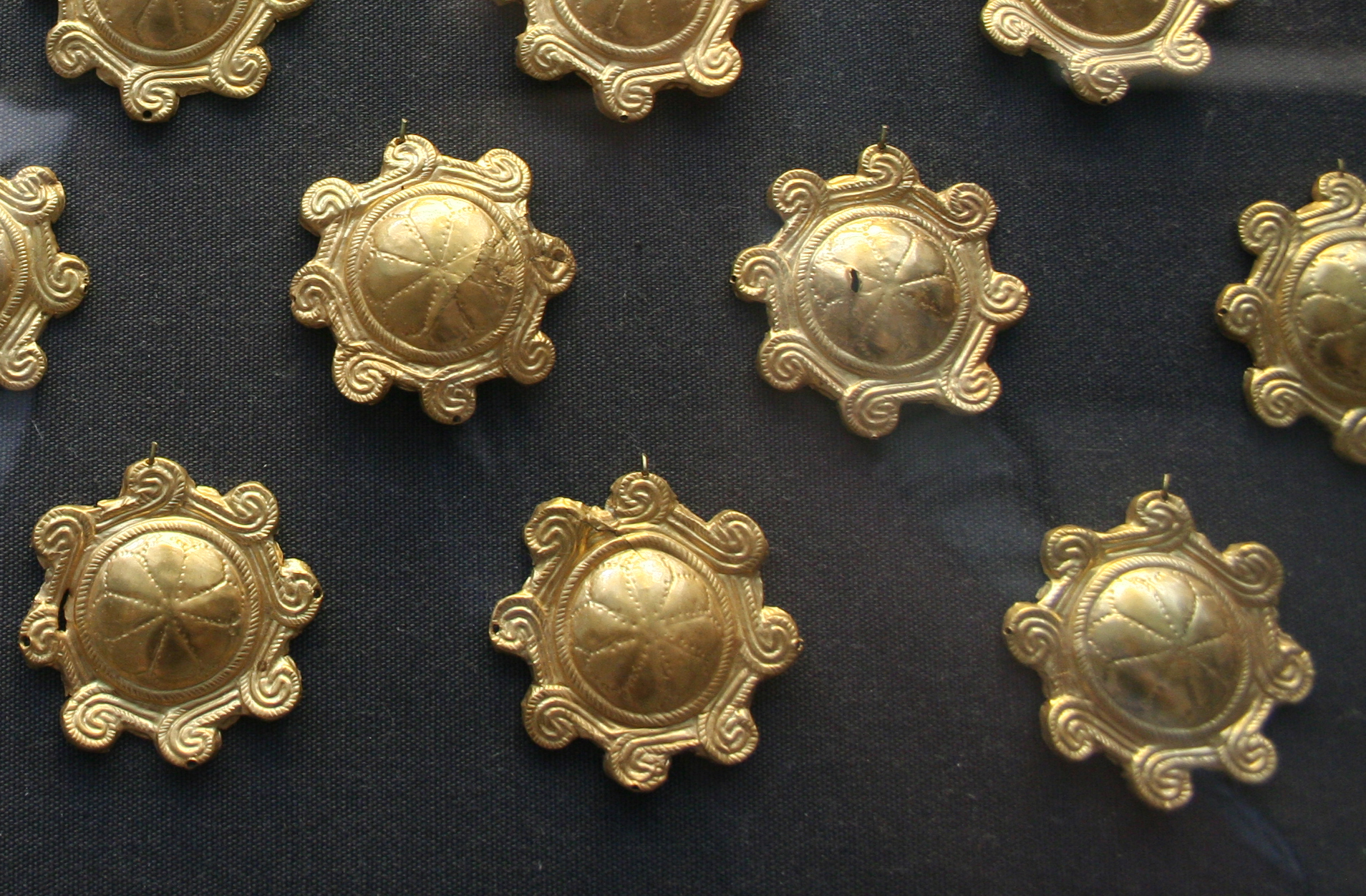
Some of 54 plaques for sewing to clothes, Aegina Treasure, British Museum

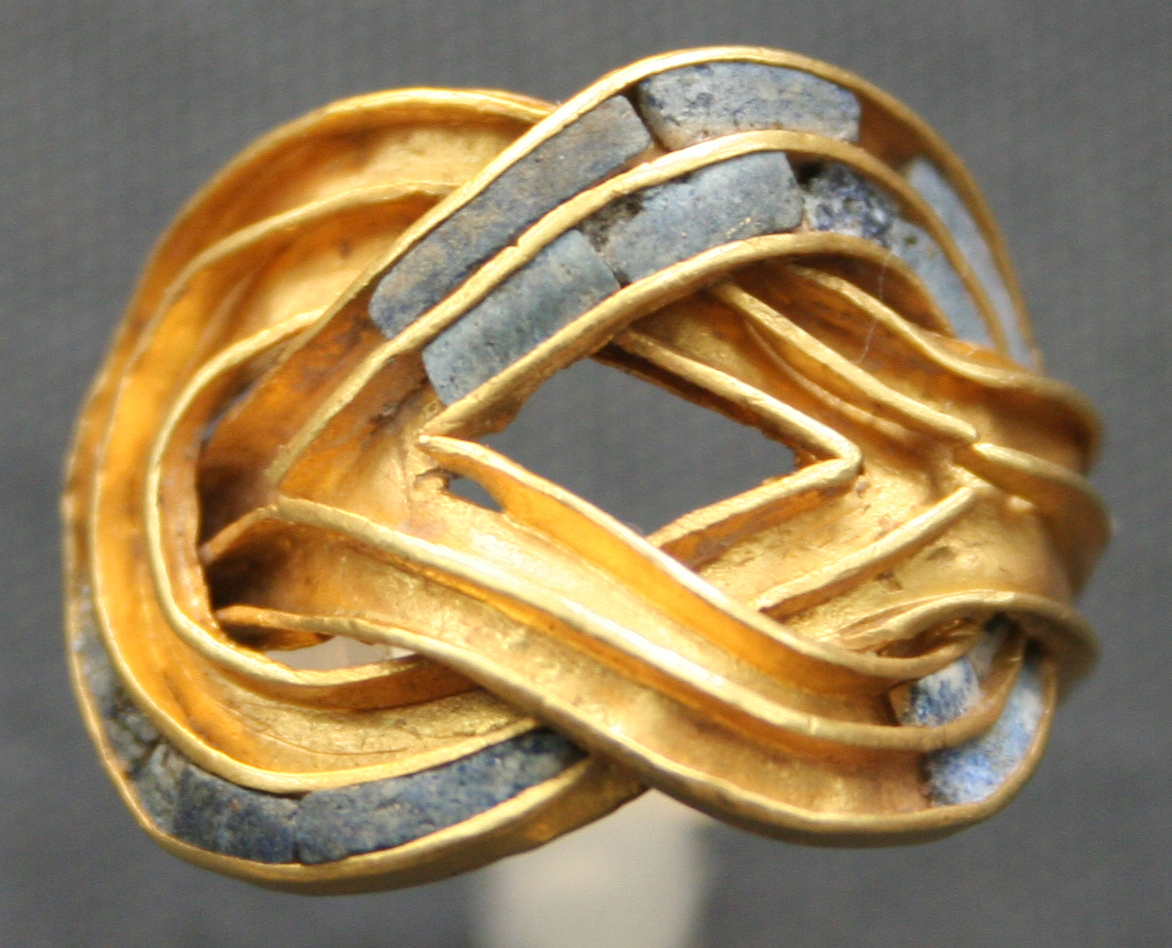
Gold knot ring with lapis lazuli inlaid, much now missing, Aegina Treasure

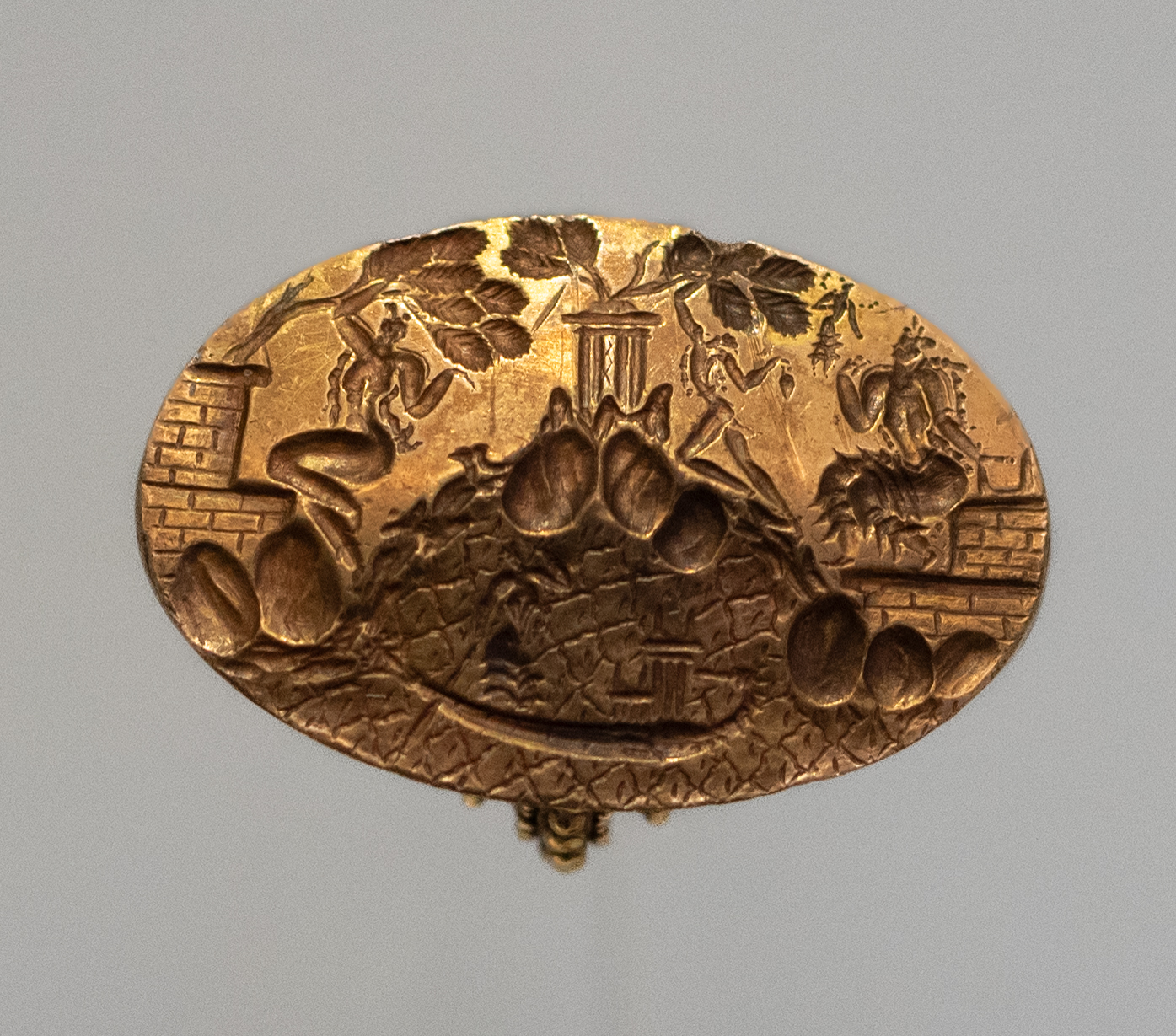
The ring of Minos. Knossos, 1450–1400 BC.

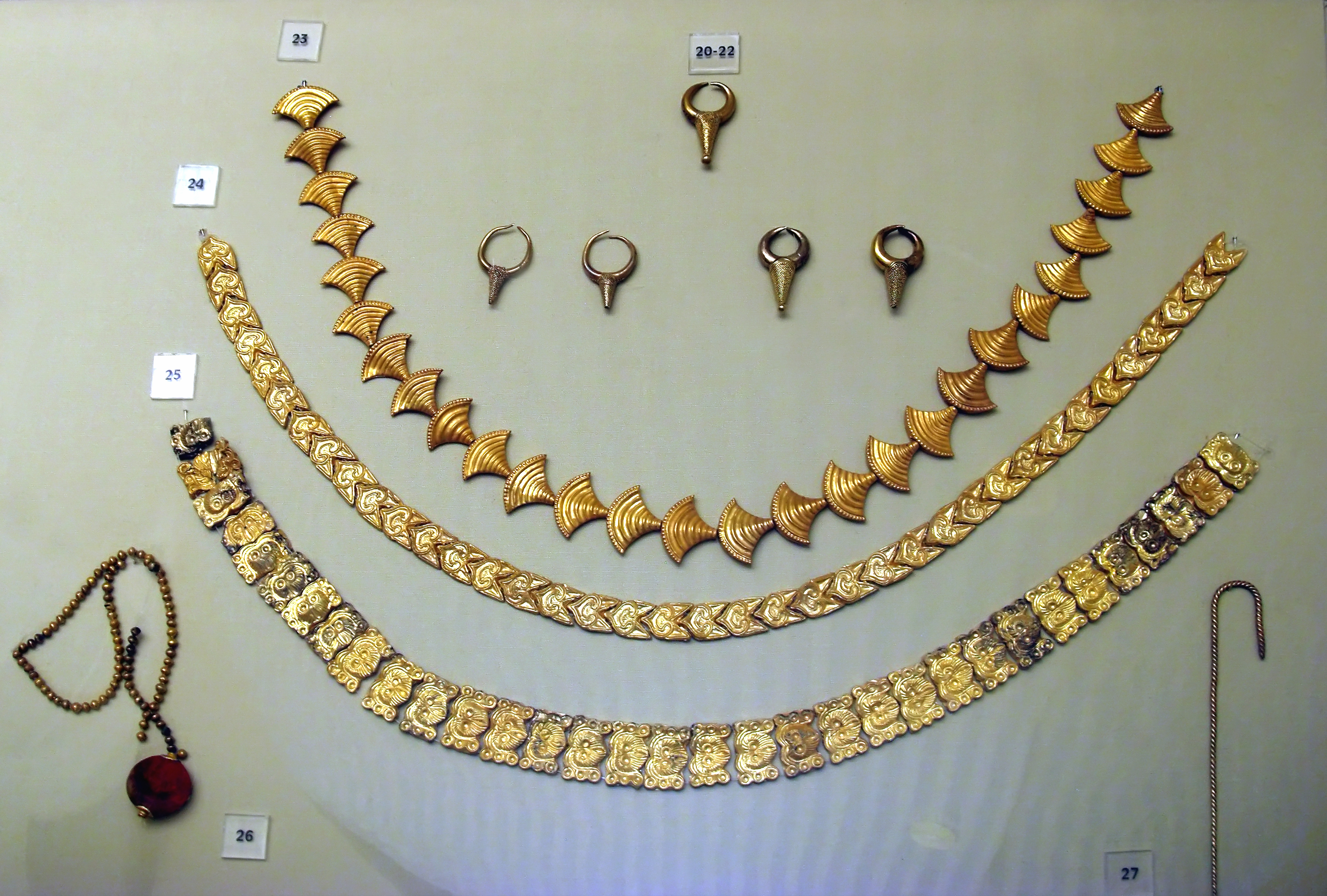
LM gold earrings (with granulated cones), necklaces and pin, AMH

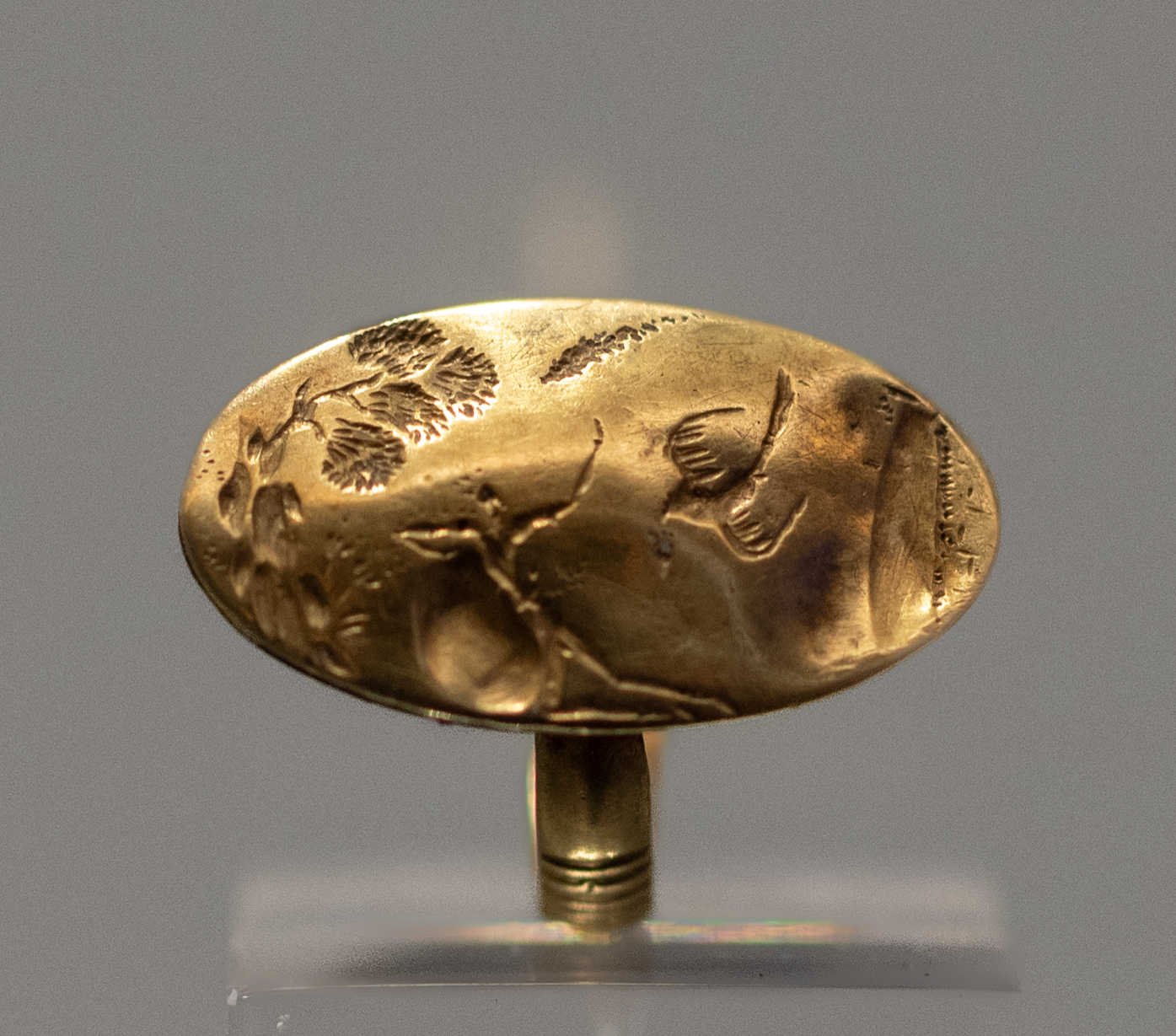
A male figure embracing a baetyl. Knossos, Sellopoulo, 1400–1375 BC.

== Weapons ==
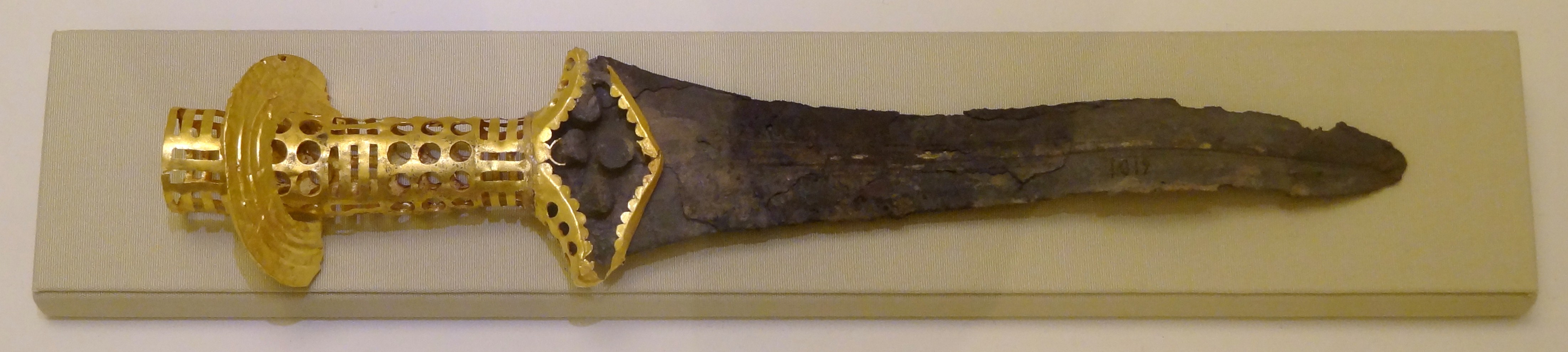
Dagger with gold hilt and bronze blade, MM, AMH

Fine decorated bronze weapons have been found in Crete, especially from LM periods, but they are far less prominent than in the remains of warrior-ruled Mycenae, where the famous shaft-grave burials contain many very richly decorated swords and daggers. In contrast spears and "slashing-knives" tend to be "severely functional". Many of these were probably made either in Crete, or by Cretans working on the mainland. Daggers are often the most lavishly decorated, with gold hilts that may be set with jewels, and the middle of the blade decorated with a variety of techniques.

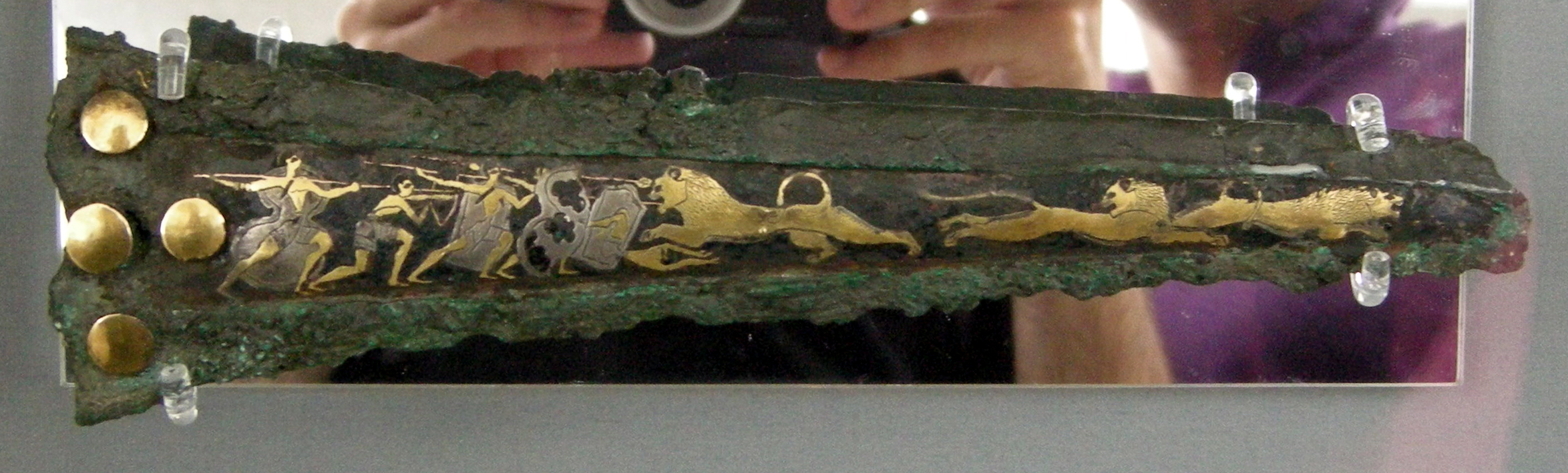
Blade of the "Lion Hunt Dagger", National Archaeological Museum, Athens

The most famous of these are a few inlaid with elaborate scenes in gold and silver set against a black (or now black) "niello" background, whose actual material and technique have been much discussed. These have long thin scenes running along the centre of the blade, which show the violence typical of the art of Mycenaean Greece, as well as a sophistication in both technique and figurative imagery that is startlingly original in a Greek context. There are a number of scenes of lions hunting and being hunted, attacking men and being attacked; most are now in the National Archaeological Museum, Athens. An alternative name for the technique is metalmalerei (German: "painting in metal"). It involves using gold and silver inlays or applied foils with black niello and the bronze, which would originally have been brightly polished. As well as providing a black colour, the niello was also used as the adhesive to hold the thin gold and silver foils in place. The "Lion Hunt Dagger", with a gazelle hunt on the other face, is the largest and most spectacular, probably Cretan from LM IA.

Shields, helmets and by the end of the period a certain amount of bronze plate armor are all well-represented in images in various media, but have few survivals with much decoration. Late Mycenaean helmets were often covered by sections of boar tusk, and had plumes at the top.

== Metal vessels ==
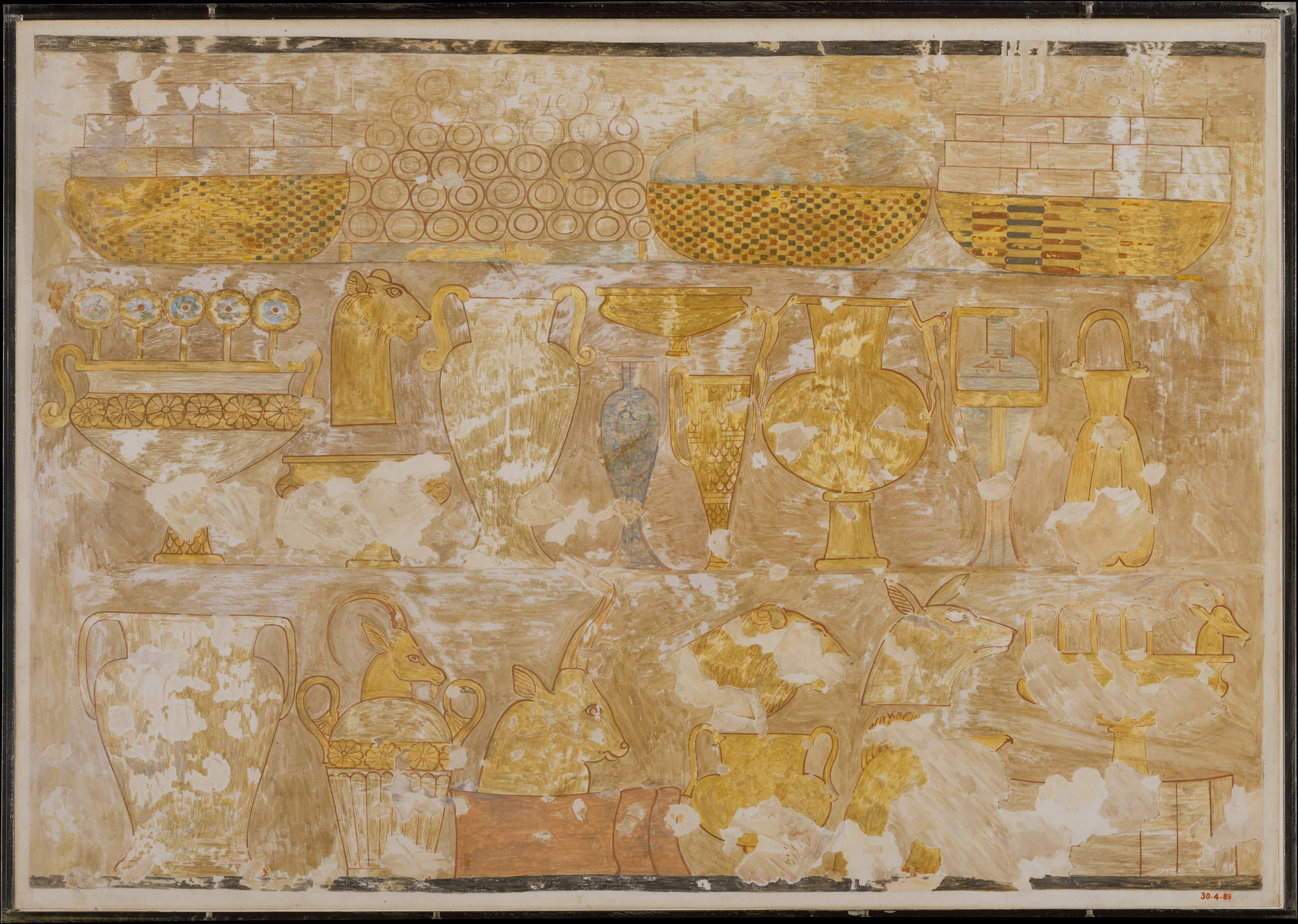
Gifts from the "Keftiu" (Cretans), copy of fresco in the Tomb of Rekhmire, the Egyptian vizier, c. 1479 –1425 BC.

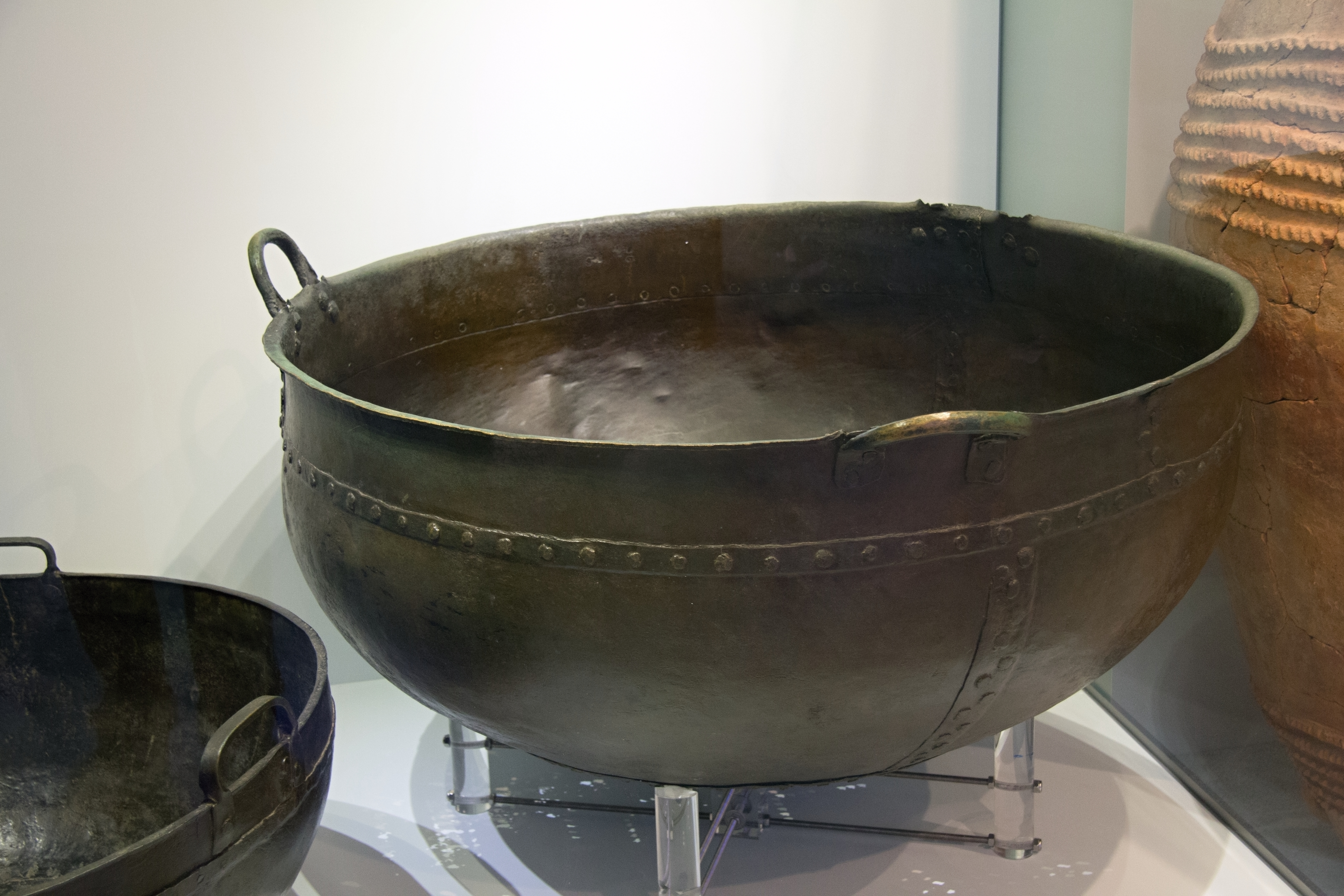
Bronze cauldron from Tylissos House A, dated LM IB (Neopalatial period). Heraklion Archaeological Museum.

Metal vessels were produced in Crete from at least as early as EM II (c. 2500) in the Prepalatial period through to LM IA (c. 1450) in the Postpalatial period and perhaps as late as LM IIIB/C (c. 1200), although it is likely that many of the vessels from these later periods were heirlooms from earlier periods. The earliest were probably made exclusively from precious metals, but from the Protopalatial period (MM IB – MM IIA) they were also produced in arsenical bronze and, subsequently, tin bronze. The archaeological record suggests that mostly cup-type forms were created in precious metals, but the corpus of bronze vessels was diverse, including cauldrons, pans, hydrias, bowls, pitchers, basins, cups, ladles and lamps.

The Minoan metal vessel tradition influenced that of the Mycenaean culture on mainland Greece, and they are often regarded as the same tradition. Many precious metal vessels found on mainland Greece exhibit Minoan characteristics, and it is thought that these were either imported from Crete or made on the mainland by Minoan metalsmiths working for Mycenaean patrons or by Mycenaean smiths who had trained under Minoan masters.

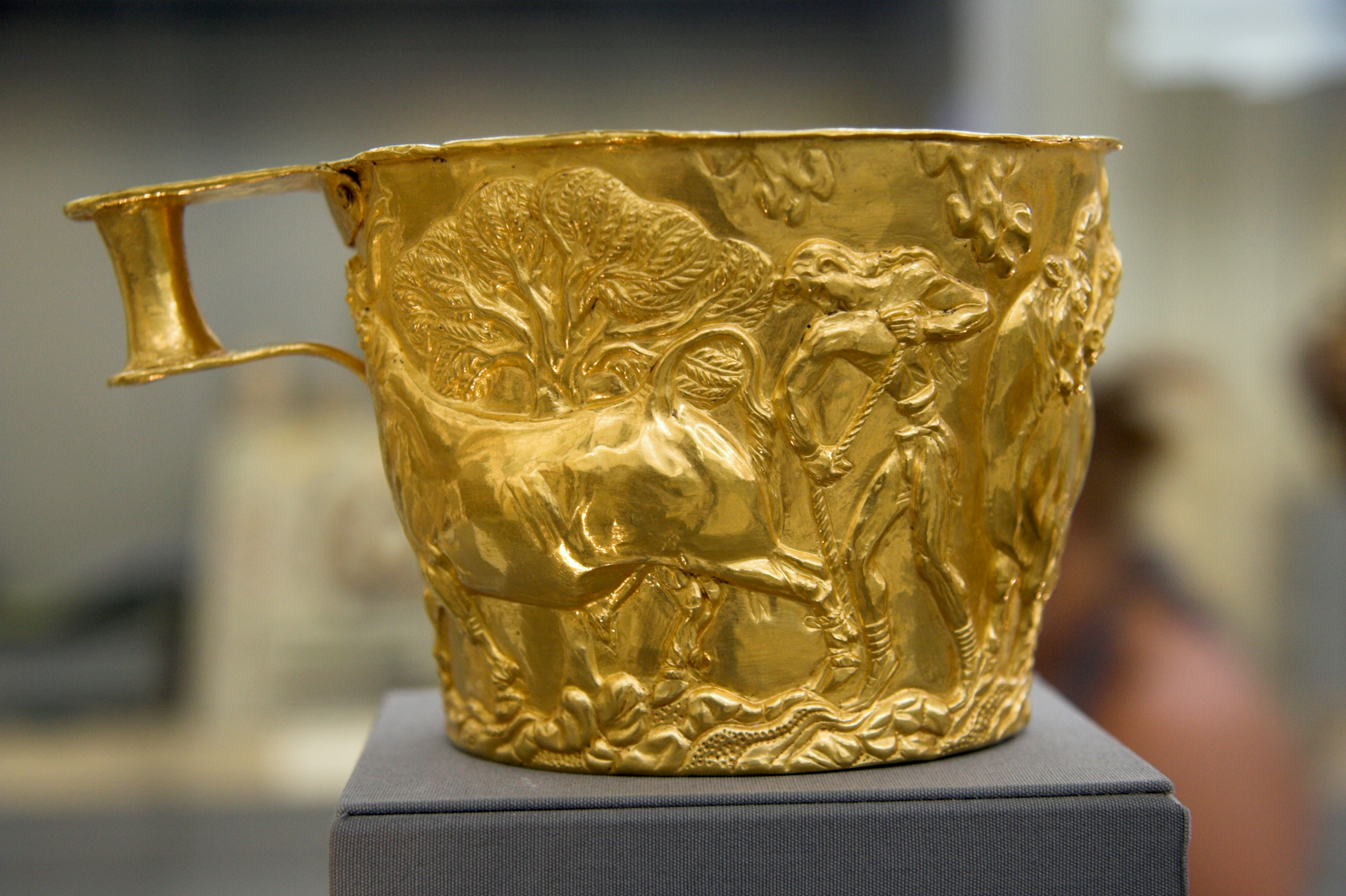
Golden cup from a LH IIA Mycenaean grave at Vapheio, one of a pair known as the "Vapheio Cups". This cup is believed to be of Minoan manufacture while its twin is thought to be Mycenaean. National Archaeological Museum, Athens.

It is not clear what the functions of the vessels were, but scholars have proposed some possibilities. Cup-types and bowls were probably for drinking and hydrias and pitchers for pouring liquids, while cauldrons and pans may have been used to prepare food, and other specialised forms such as sieves, lamps and braziers had more specific functions. Several scholars have suggested that metal vessels played an important role in ritual drinking ceremonies and communal feasting, where the use of the valuable bronze and precious metal vessels by elites signified their high status, power and superiority over lower-status participants who used ceramic vessels.

During later periods, when Mycenaean peoples settled in Crete, metal vessels were often interred as grave goods. In this type of conspicuous burial, they may have symbolised the wealth and status of the individual by alluding to their ability to sponsor feasts, and it is possible that sets of vessels interred in graves were used for funerary feasting prior to the burial itself. Metal vessels may also have been used for political gift exchange, where the value of the gift reflects the wealth or status of the giver and the perceived importance of the recipient. This could explain the presence of Minoan vessels in the Mycenaean shaft graves of Grave Circle A and their depiction in an Egyptian Eighteenth Dynasty tomb at Thebes, that of Rekhmire (TT100).

Extant vessels from the Prepalatial to Neopalatial periods are almost exclusively from destruction contexts; that is, they were buried by the remains of buildings which were destroyed by natural or man-made disasters. By contrast, vessels remaining from Final Palace and Postpalatial periods, after Mycenaean settlement in Crete, are mostly from burial contexts. This reflects, to a large extent, the change in burial practices during this time. The significance is that vessels from the earlier settlement destruction contexts were accidentally deposited and may therefore reflect a random selection of the types of vessels in circulation at the time, but those from the later burial contexts were deliberately chosen and deposited, possibly for specific symbolic reasons which we are not aware of. This means that the extant vessels from this period are probably less representative of the varieties of vessel types that were in circulation at the time.

Minoan metal vessels were generally manufactured by raising sheet metal, although some vessels may have been cast by the lost wax technique. Research suggests that Minoan metalsmiths mostly used stone hammers without handles and wooden metalsmithing stakes to raise vessels. Many vessels have legs, handles, rims and decorative elements which were cast separately and riveted onto the raised vessel forms. Separate pieces of raised sheet were also riveted together to form larger vessels. Some vessels were decorated by various means. Cast handles and rims of some bronze vessels have decorative motifs in relief on their surfaces, and the walls of some vessels were worked in repoussé and chasing. Precious metal vessels were ornamented with repoussé, ornamental rivets, gilding, bi-metallic overlays and inlaying of other precious metals or a niello-type substance.

Motifs on metal vessels correlate to those found on other Minoan art forms such as pottery, frescoes, stone seals and jewellery, including spirals, arcades, flora and fauna, including bulls, birds and marine life. Minoan smiths probably also produced animal-head rhyta in metal, as they did in stone and ceramic, but none in metal are extant from Crete. The iconographical significance of these motifs is largely unknown, although some scholars have identified general themes from the contexts in which they were used.
