= Minoan religion =

Prehistoric belief system

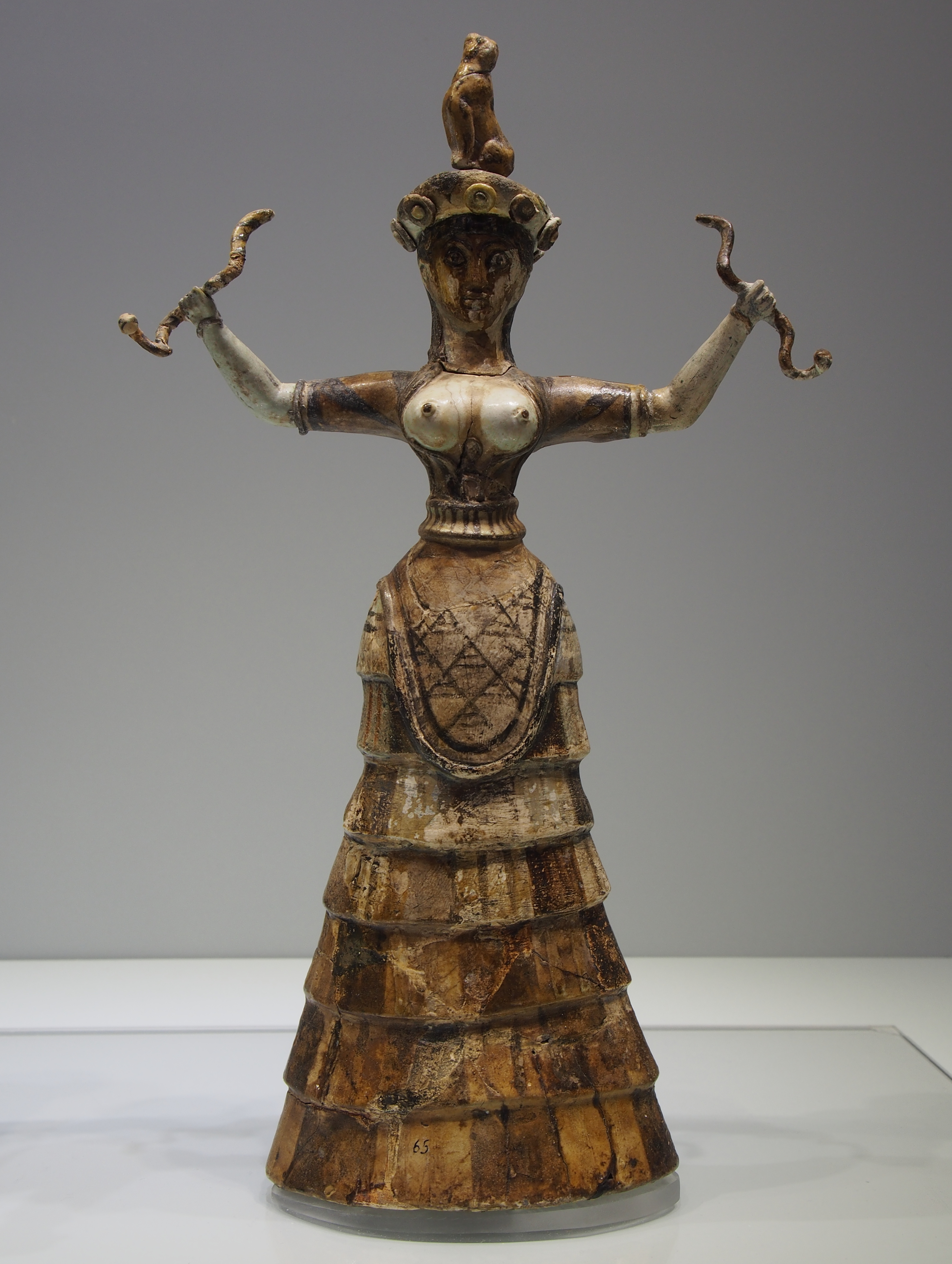
"Snake Goddess" or a priestess performing a ritual

Minoan religion was the religion of the Bronze Age Minoan civilization of Crete. In the absence of readable texts from most of the period, modern scholars have reconstructed it almost totally on the basis of archaeological evidence such as Minoan paintings, statuettes, vessels for rituals and seals and rings. Minoan religion is considered to have been closely related to Near Eastern ancient religions. The names of Minoan deities, and the relationship Minoans had with their gods, is unknown. Prominent sacred symbols include the bull and the horns of consecration, the labrys double-headed axe, and possibly the serpent.

The old view was that, in stark contrast to contemporary cultures in Egypt, Mesopotamia and Syria, Minoan religious practice was not centered around massive formal public temples. However, it is now thought the Minoan "palaces", and perhaps also the smaller "villas", were themselves the temples, and they were primarily used to perform religious rituals. There were also rural peak sanctuaries and many sacred caves. There is a question as to how much the palace religion that seems to be shown in Minoan painting and seals was followed or even understood by most of the population.

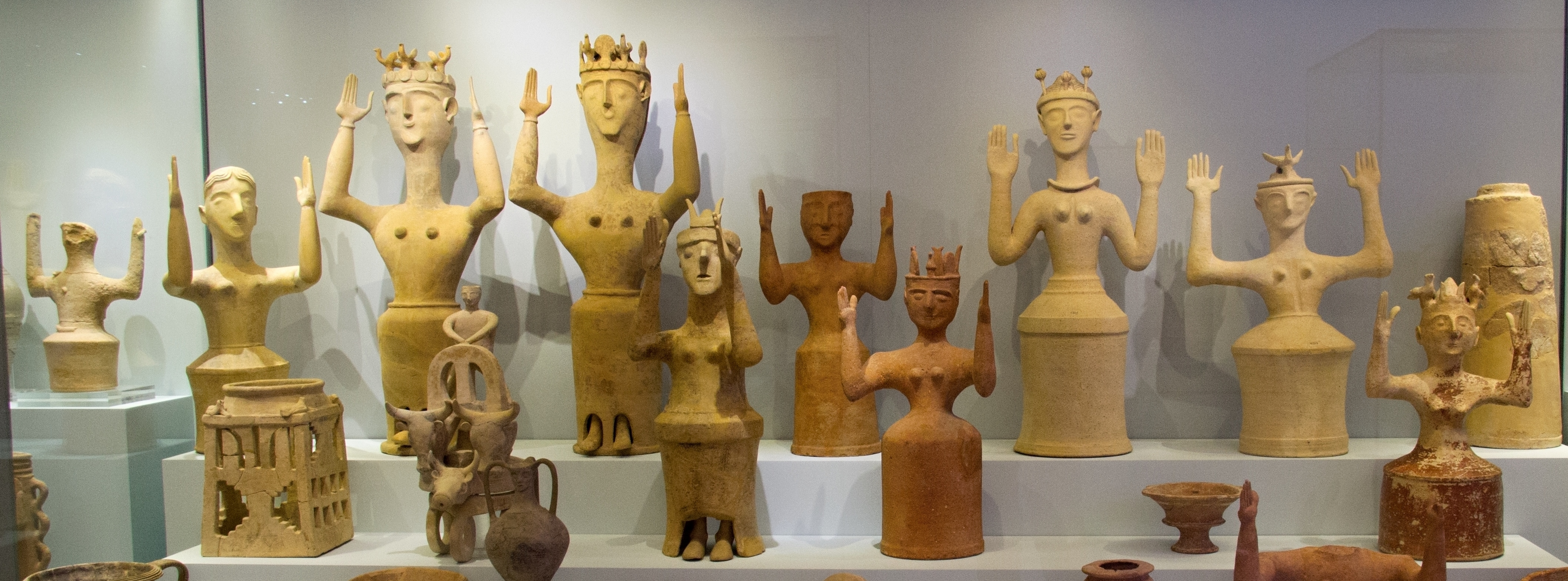
Late Minoan terracotta votive offering figures believed to represent deities. The poppy goddess is in the back row

It is generally agreed that the dominant figure in Minoan religion was a goddess, although a number of deities are thought to have been worshipped. A younger male figure, perhaps a consort or son, is often associated with her and presented as her subordinate. The Goddess was also often associated with animals and escorted by fantastic creatures. She seems to have been served by priestesses, which complicates the identification of female figures in Minoan art. This problem is exemplified by the snake goddess figurines; while Sir Arthur Evans believed the figures depicted a snake goddess and her priestess, there has been much scholarly debate over whether Evans is accurate or whether they are both priestesses, the same deity, or different deities.

Many fundamental questions about Minoan religious practice remain. These include: the extent to which it, and its "priests", were tied into the political system; the amount of centralization or regional divergence; the changes over time, especially after the presumed Mycenaean conquest around 1450 BC; the depth of borrowings from Egypt, Syria and Mesopotamia; and the degree to which it influenced later ancient Greek religion.

== Deities ==
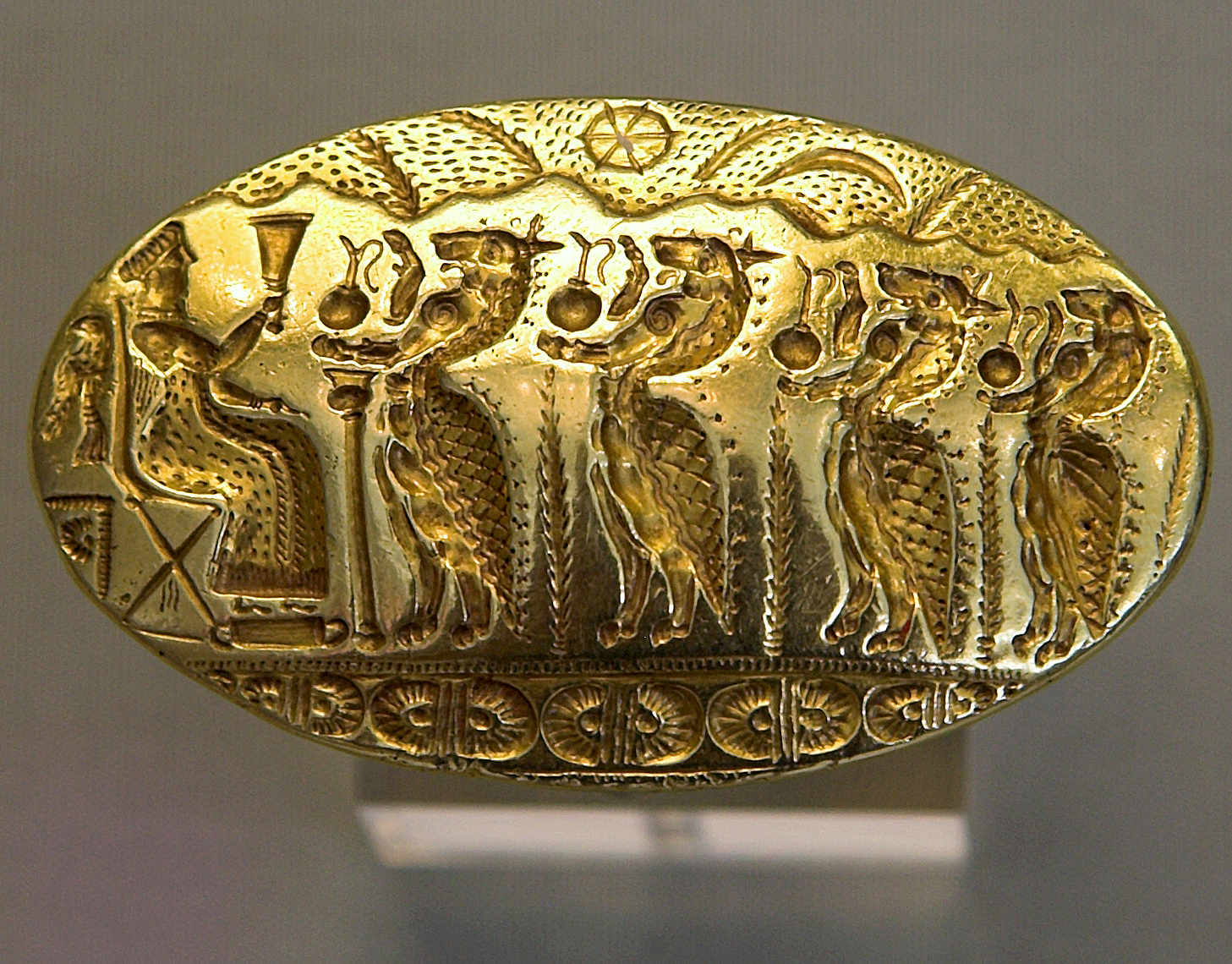
Gold ring with Sitting Goddess and row of Minoan Genius figures bearing offerings, found in context from Mycenaean Greece, but probably made in Crete, NAMA

Arthur Evans thought the Minoans worshipped, more or less exclusively, a mother goddess; this view heavily influenced the field for decades. Recent scholarly opinion sees a much more diverse religious landscape, however, the lack of readable texts or inscriptions makes establishing a definite conclusion difficult. The Minoan pantheon featured many deities— the majority are female, but a young, spear-wielding male god is also prominent. Currently, no deities have been named.

Much of Minoan art appears to hold some sort of religious significance. The Minoan government was likely a theocracy, which would have led to a considerable overlap of politics, religion, and art. It is often very difficult to distinguish between images of worshippers, priests and priestesses, rulers and deities; indeed the priestly and royal roles may have often been the same, as leading rituals is often seen as the essence of rulership. It is also possible that religious ritual involved humans performing as deities, further confusing what art depicts.

=== Goddesses ===
There likely was a central, probably dominant, nature or mother goddess worshipped by the Minoans. Multiple types of goddesses have been identified, including a mountain goddess, worshipped at peak sanctuaries; a snake goddess who possibly served as a protector of the house; the Potnia Theron; and a goddess of childbirth. Late Minoan terracotta votive figures like the poppy goddess— perhaps depicting a worshipper— carry attributes such as birds in their diadems.

Some scholars believe the central goddess was a solar deity. Károly Kerényi believed that the most important goddess was Ariadne, daughter of King Minos who helped Theseus escape the Labyrinth. She is identified in Linear B (Mycenean Greek) tablets in Knossos.

=== Creatures ===
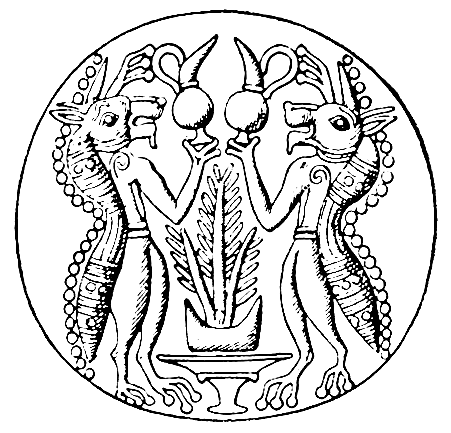
Two Minoan Genii performing a libation over an altar

The Minoan Genius was a fantastical creature often depicted on ancient Minoan seals. It contained similarities to both lions and hippopotami, which implies a connection to ancient Egypt. These creatures— often depicted in pairs or groups— appears as an attendant and supporter of deities, and may have played a role as a protector of children, related to fertility. They probably did not receive worship themselves. The griffin also appears, for example, drawing a chariot on the Hagia Triada sarcophagus. A bull-headed man, perhaps a precursor of the Minotaur, does not appear on seals until after the Mycenean invasion.

== Cultic practice ==
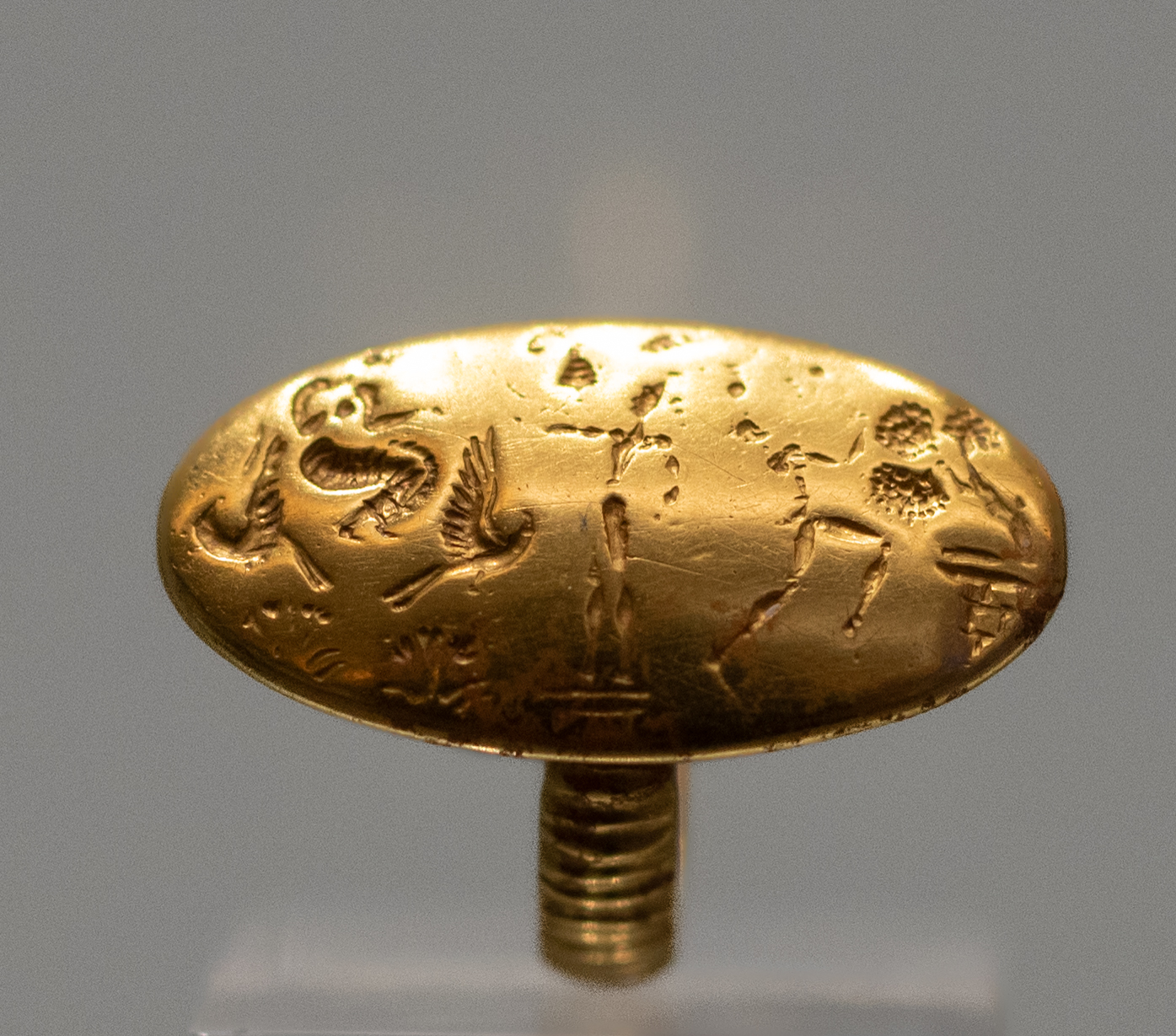
Worn gold ring with epiphany scene: at right a worshipper invokes a tree, at left a goddess with two birds appears in the air. The standing central figure may be a god.

Arthur Evans came to believe that at the peak of the power of Knossos it was ruled by a priest king and his consort, a priest queen, who led elaborate rituals, and also controlled much of the palace economy of Crete, collecting, storing and redistributing agricultural produce. As he recognised, the evidence for this is slim. In contrast to neighbouring mainland civilizations there is a notable absence of clear depictions of monarchs, and few grand royal tombs. Despite this, and the debunking of some of Evans' claims, such as his reconstruction of the so-called Priest-King Fresco (or Prince of the Lilies), many scholars still think that some form of theocracy existed on Crete. This would align Crete with contemporary Egypt and Mesopotamia, where kings were usually regarded as having close relations with the gods.

The evidence for priestesses leading rituals is stronger, though there are also men with a special role as priests or priest-kings are identifiable by diagonal bands on their long robes, and carrying over their shoulder a ritual "axe-sceptre" with a rounded blade. These increase in the Neopalatial Period, when there may be evidence of men dressing as priestesses, possibly to evade gender restrictions.

Retrieval of metal and clay votive figures, double axes, miniature vessels, models of artifacts, animals, and human figures has identified sites of cult, such as numerous small shrines in Minoan Crete, with peak sanctuaries, some among the very numerous sacred caves of Crete. Over 300 of these have been explored; they were the centres for some cult, but temples, as the Greeks developed them, were unknown. Within the palace complex, no central rooms devoted to a cult have been certainly recognized other than the centre court, where youths, perhaps of both sexes, perhaps performed the bull-leaping ritual.

Many very elaborate vessels are made with a hole at the bottom, so are clearly for pouring libations, probably of the blood from animal sacrifices, as well as wine and other liquids or grains from agriculture. At Phaistos excavations have revealed basins for animal sacrifice dating to the period 2000 to 1700 BC. Whether human sacrifices were made is controversial, as discussed below. It has been suggested that both saffron and honey had a religious role. The bull-leaping ritual is so prominently depicted that it is assumed it had a religious significance. Bulls, especially their heads, are very prominent in palace art, but they were probably not worshipped. The very late Agia Triada Sarcophagus shows a bull sacrifice, but it is not clear if this was typical of earlier cult practices. Whether sacrifices were burned is unclear.

The chryselephantine Palaikastro Kouros is the only probable cult image for worship in a shrine that has survived; it seems to have been deliberately destroyed in the Mycenean invasion. Parts of other large sculptures, possibly cult images mostly made of wood, have been found at Knossos: a gold "wig", and clay feet. Many types of smaller terracotta votive images are also thought to represent deities, although others show worshippers. Worshippers often adopt a gesture with the clenched fist held to the forehead, or arms crossed over the chest. Priestess figures, especially when making offerings, extend their arms out and down, with open palms facing up or down, perhaps depending on the deity concerned.

An aspect of Minoan religion interpreted from Minoan seals and gold rings is the epiphany or theophany, where (according to art historians) a deity appears, or even is summoned, by a worshipper. One type of these scenes is where a worshipper apparently reaches the female deity by shaking or holding a tree. Another type of epiphany scene shows the devotee lying down on an oval rock, perhaps asleep. This has been interpreted as a mourner lying on a grave, but Nanno Marinatos suggests the rock represents a special place, or rock, believed to be where the deity may become manifest; what is called a baetyl in later Mediterranean cultures. This and the tree-shaking scene can appear together, but unlike the tree-shakers, those lying on rocks can face the deity.

These and similar types of epiphanic scenes very often include what E. Kyriakidis calls “Unidentified Floating Objects on Minoan Seals", many, like the snake or labrys, found in other contexts and accepted as having religious significance. Kyriakidis interprets these, when floating in the upper parts of seals (whether in stone or metal), as representations of constellations of stars.

== Changes over time ==
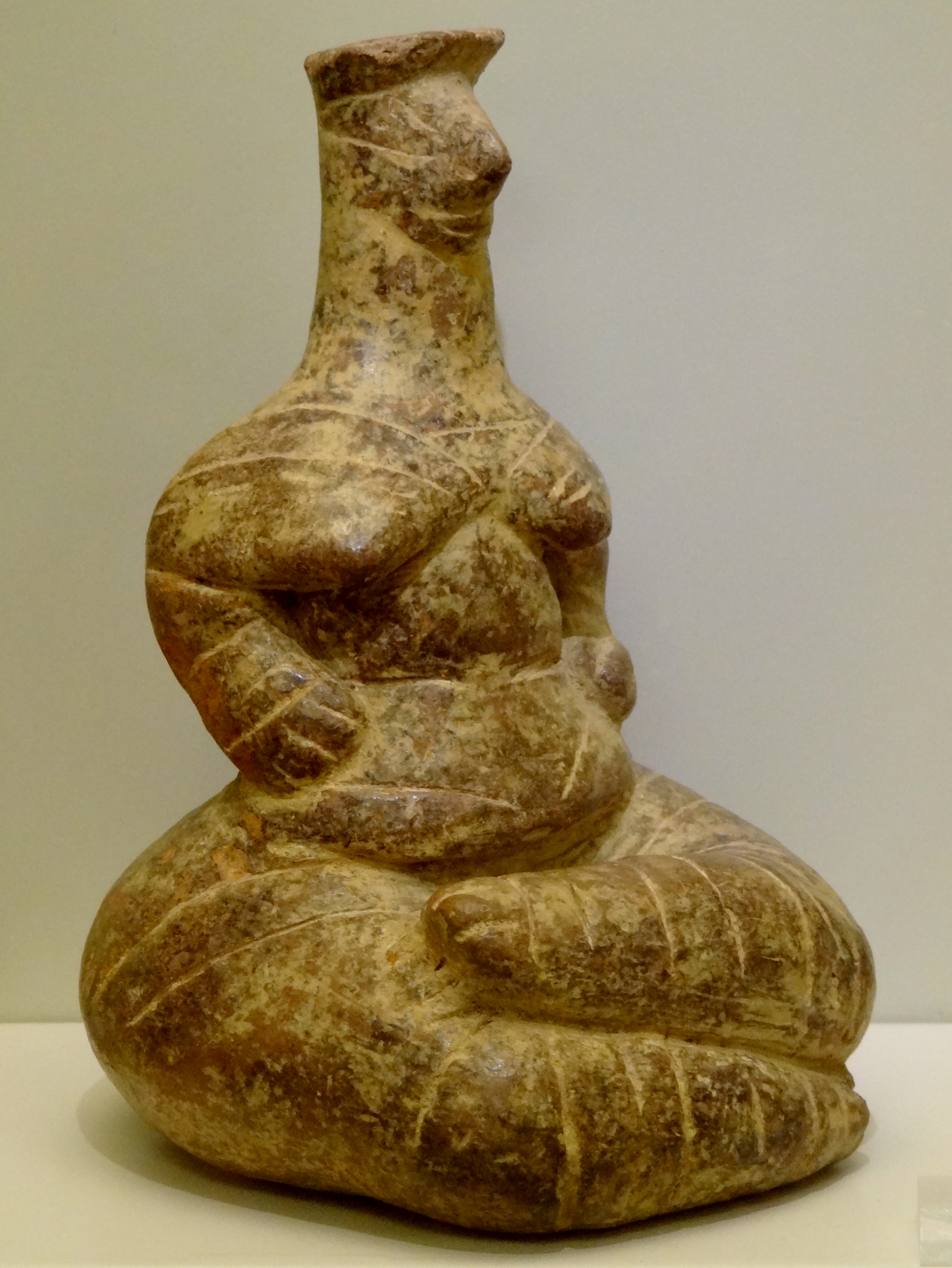
The Neolithic "Steatopygous Goddess from Pano Chorio", c. 5800–4800 BC, terracotta, AMH. The finest such Cretan figure; whether she is really a goddess is uncertain.

Numerous terracotta figurines from the pre-Minoan Neolithic period have been excavated, mostly around houses. The figurines depict squatting women with an emphasis on large parts of the female body from the breasts to the thighs, and they often have small heads and no feet. These are interpreted as associated with fertility, but the uses of these feminine figures in homes and who they were intended to represent is unclear. The female "ritual dress" appears in art from the Protopalatial Period, and from that point on the religious rituals in the newly-built palaces probably developed considerably.

Minoan religion appears to have changed emphasis in the Neopalatial Period, shifting away from maternal and fertility elements in the main female goddess, and introducing the cult of the "young god", possibly her son, but probably her partner (or both). The peak sanctuaries may have declined in importance during the Neopalatial Period.

After the Mycenaean invasion, inscriptions in Linear B give the names of some deities, also found from mainland Mycenean Greece. The extent to which Crete retained a distinctive religion in this period is a complicated question; the ruling elite were probably immigrants, but the mass of the population were probably descended from Minoan Cretans. However, as previously mentioned, the extent to which the majority of the population understood the Minoan religion is uncertain.

== Bull-leaping ritual ==
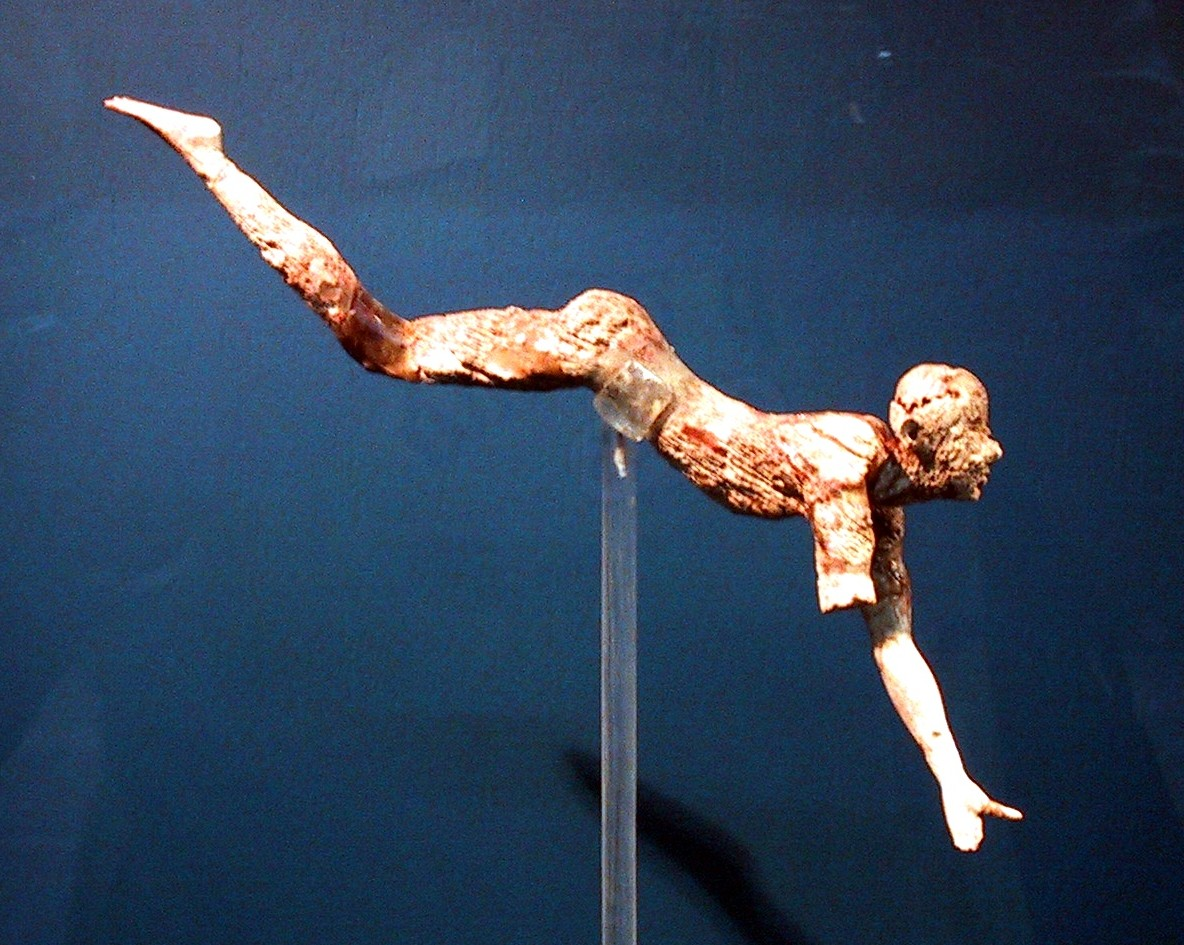
The bull leaper from Knossos (Heraklion Archaeological Museum)

A major festive celebration or ritual was the famous Minoan bull-leaping, represented in the frescoes of Knossos, and inscribed in miniature Minoan seals and gold rings. Young people—whether young women were involved, and if so how, remains a matter of debate—are shown with bulls, including executing spectacular vaults that springboard off the bulls' back. Such a figure is included in most depictions.

There is debate among scholars as to whether the athletes actually vaulted over the bull. Sir Arthur Evans argued that the Bull-Leaping Fresco depicts acrobats literally seizing the bull by the horns and leaping over the creature's back. Nanno Marinatos has asserted that the fresco more likely shows young Minoan people attempting to ride the bull and that the act of catching a charging bull and vaulting over it is unrealistic. Others see the demanding ritual as some kind of rite of passage or initiation test for entry into the Minoan elite.

Whether the bull was then sacrificed is unclear; what is clearly a bull sacrifice (probably as part of a funeral) is depicted on the Hagia Triada Sarcophagus, but this dates to after the Mycenaean conquest, and may not reflect earlier practices. The gold Vaphio Cups show two different methods of capturing wild bulls. Many scholars believe the central courts of the Minoan palaces were where the bull-leaping took place, but Nanno Marinatos doubts this, because there was too little safe space for spectators, and the stone paving would make the bulls slip.

Frescos showing bulls and bull-leaping come mainly from Knossos, but the recently discovered Minoan frescoes from Tell el-Daba in Egypt include a large bull-leaping scene; possibly these were painted after a marriage with a Minoan princess.

== Hagia Triada sarcophagus ==
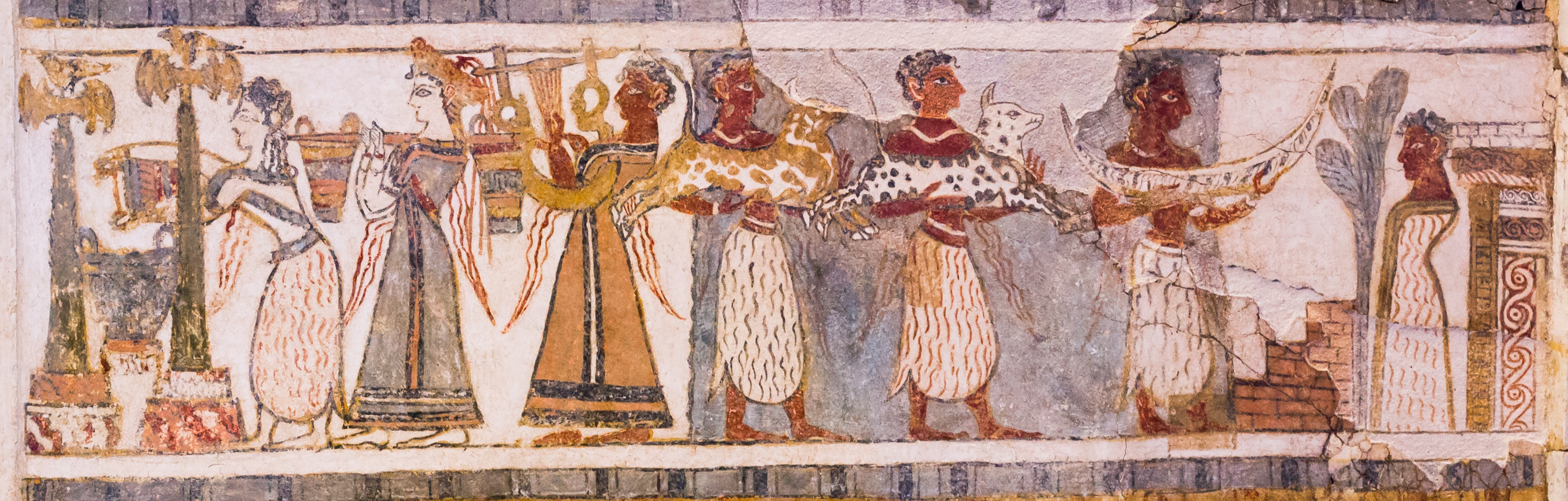
Scene on the "front" side of the Hagia Triada sarcophagus, with offerings

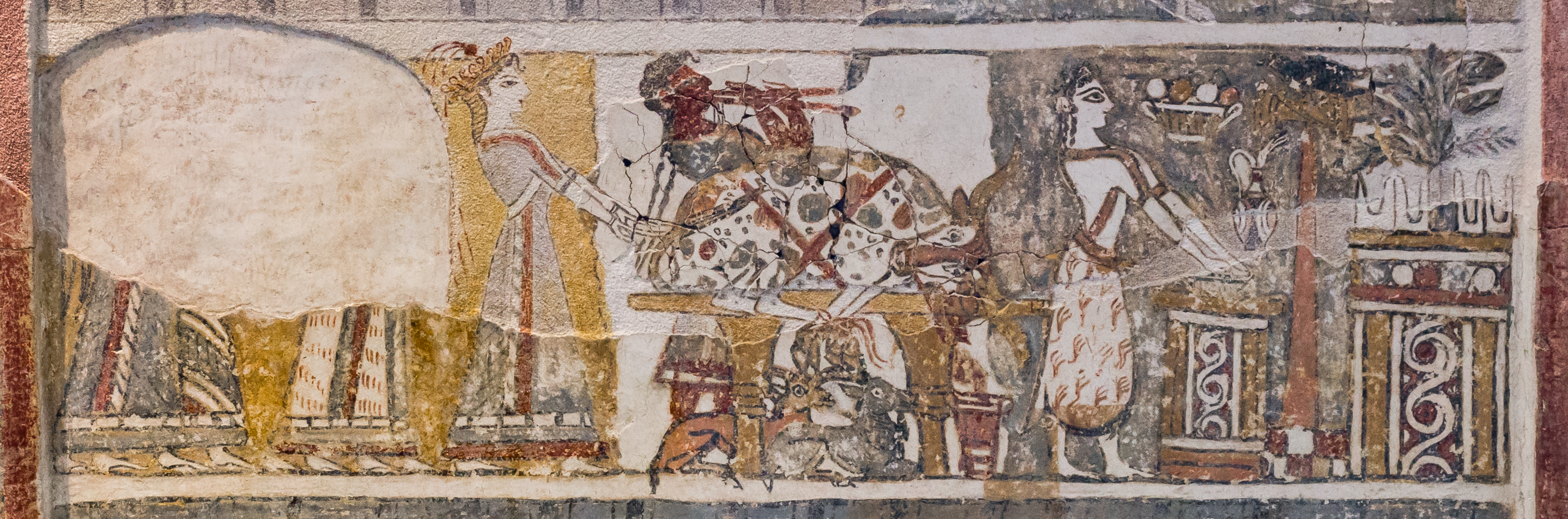
Scene on the "rear" side of the Hagia Triada sarcophagus, with bull sacrifice

This virtually unique painted stone sarcophagus is mostly in good condition, and was a much grander version of the pottery larnax ash-chests that had become common by this late period. It is presumed to show the funeral rituals for the burial of an important male figure, including the sacrifice of a bull, and other offerings. It dates to about 1400 BC or the following decades, well after the presumed Mycenaen conquest of Crete, and the extent to which what it shows reflects pre-conquest practices is one of the many questions it raises. Apart from what is presumed to be the standing corpse of the deceased (at right on the "front"), the most important figures leading the ritual are female (very possibly the same woman repeated), with men limited to carrying offerings and playing music.

== Burial and mortuary practice ==
Like much of the archaeology of the Bronze Age, burial remains constitute much of the material and archaeological evidence for the period. By the end of the Second Palace Period, Minoan burial practice is dominated by two broad forms: beehive tombs or tholoi, located in southern Crete, and "house tombs" in the north and the east. Of course, there are many trends and patterns within Minoan mortuary practice that do not conform to this simple breakdown. Over all, burial was the most popular; cremation does not seem to have been a popular means of disposition of the dead in Bronze Age Crete. Throughout this period there is a trend towards individual burials, with some distinguished exceptions. These include the much-debated Chryssolakkos complex, Malia, consisting of a number of buildings forming a complex. This is located in the centre of Malia's burial area and may have been the focus for burial rituals, or the 'crypt' for a notable family.

These tombs often evidence group burial, where more than one body is deposited. These may represent the burial crypts for generations of a kin group, or of a particular settlement where the individuals are not closely related and shared in the construction of the tomb. The house tomb at Gournia is a typical example, where the construction consisted of a clay and reed roof, topping a mud-brick and stone base. At Ayia Photia, certain rock-cut chamber tombs may have been used solely for the burial of children, indicating complex burial patterns that differed from region to region. Mortuary furniture and grave goods varied widely, but could include storage jars, bronze articles such as tools and weapons, and beauty articles such as pendants. Little is known about mortuary rituals, or the stages through which the deceased passed before final burial, but it has been indicated that 'toasting rituals' may have formed a part of this, suggested by the prevalence of drinking vessels found at some tombs.

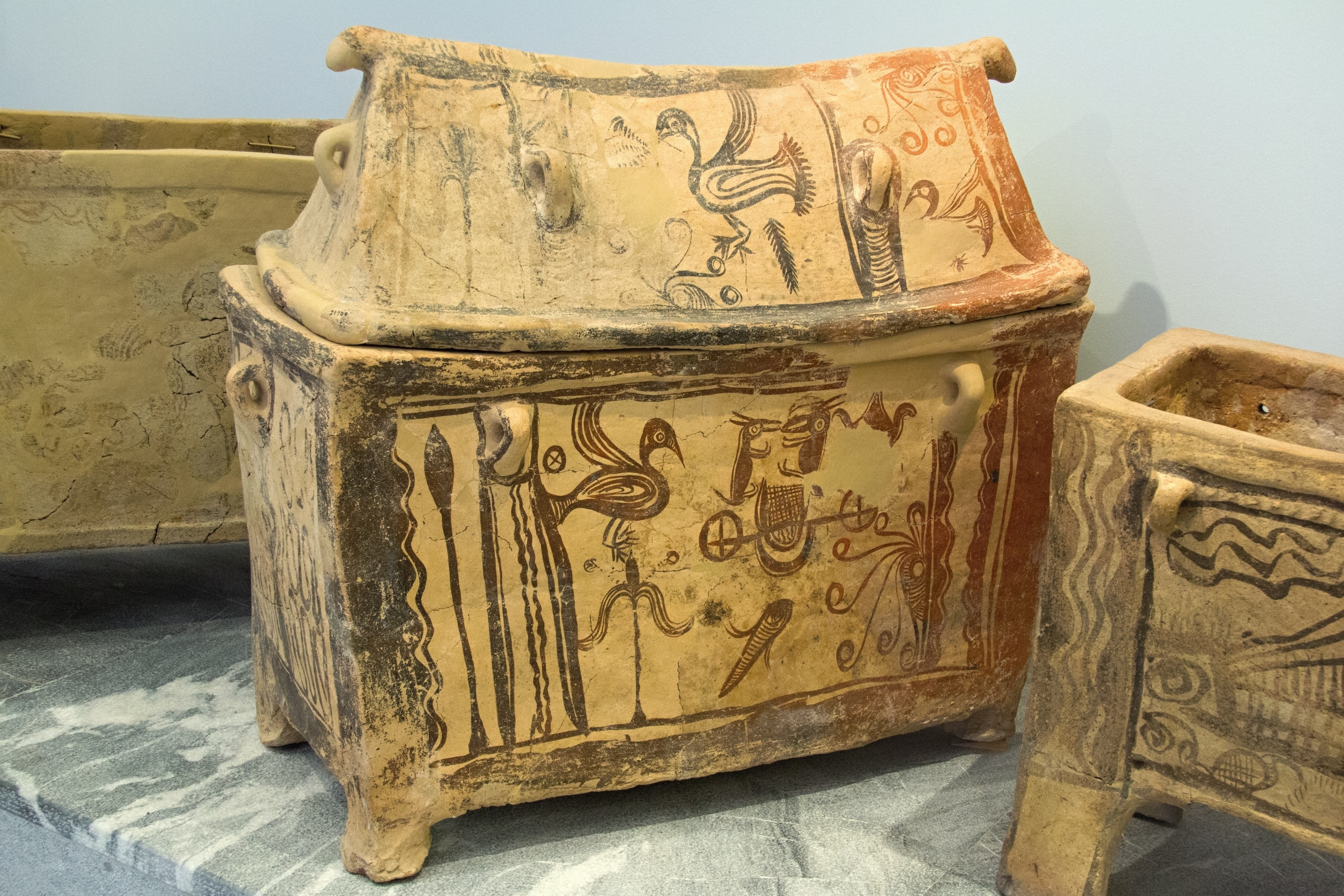
Late Minoan III larnax from Kavrochori, Archaeological Museum of Heraklion

In later periods (EM III) a trend towards singular burials, usually in clay pithoi (large storage vessels), is observed throughout Crete, replacing the practice of built tombs. Equally, the introduction of larnax burials emerges, where the body was deposited in a clay or wooden sarcophagus. These coffins were often richly decorated with motifs and scenes similar to those of the earlier fresco and vase painting tradition. However, rock-cut tombs and tholoi remained in use even by the LM III period, including the site of Phylaki.

The distribution of burial sites varies in time and space. Some functional demands may have influenced the decision to locate a cemetery: the Late Minoan rock-cut tombs at Armenoi utilise the geography of the area for structural support, where chambers are dug deep into the rock. Generally, cemeteries tend to cluster in regions close to settled areas. The Mochlos cemetery, for example, would have served the inhabitants of that island who settled in the south of the area. The cemetery itself has been interpreted to indicate a visible hierarchy, perhaps indicating social differentiation within the local population; larger, monumental tombs for the 'èlite', and smaller tombs, including some early pithoi burials, for the larger part of the population.

The German geologist Hans Georg Wunderlich argued that the Palace of Knossos itself was a mortuary temple in the Egyptian style. This interpretation is strongly rejected by mainstream archaeology.

== Human sacrifice ==
Evidence pointing to the practice of human sacrifice has been found at three sites: (1) Anemospilia, in a MMII (1800–1700 BC) building near Mount Juktas, interpreted as a temple, (2) an EMII (2900–2300 BC) sanctuary complex at Fournou Korifi in south central Crete, and (3) Knossos, in an LMIB (1500–1450 BC) building known as the "North House." (explanation of abbreviations) The subject remains controversial.

The temple at Anemospilia was destroyed by earthquake in the MMII period. The building seems to be a tripartite shrine, and terracotta feet and some carbonized wood were interpreted by the excavators as the remains of a cult statue. Four human skeletons were found in its ruins; one, belonging to a young man, was found in an unusually contracted position on a raised platform, suggesting that he had been trussed up for sacrifice, much like the bull in the sacrifice scene on the Mycenaean-era Agia Triadha Sarcophagus. A bronze dagger was among his bones, and the discoloration of the bones on one side of his body suggests he died of blood loss. The bronze blade was fifteen inches long and had images of a boar on each side. The bones were on a raised platform at the centre of the middle room, next to a pillar with a trough at its base.

Rodney Castleden, discussing the findings, labeled it the remains of a seventeen-year-old boy who was sacrificed.

His ankles had evidently been tied and his legs folded up to make him fit on the table...He had been ritually murdered with the long bronze dagger engraved with a boar's head that laid besides him.

The positions of the other three skeletons suggest that an earthquake caught them by surprise—the skeleton of a twenty-eight-year-old woman was spread-eagled on the ground in the same room as the sacrificed male. Next to the sacrificial platform was the skeleton of a man in his late thirties, with broken legs. His arms were raised, as if to protect himself from falling debris, which suggests that his legs were broken by the collapse of the building in the earthquake. In the front hall of the building was the fourth skeleton, too poorly preserved to allow determination of age or gender. Nearby 105 fragments of a clay vase were discovered, scattered in a pattern that suggests it had been dropped by the person in the front hall when he was struck by debris from the collapsing building. The jar appears to have contained bull's blood.

Unfortunately, the excavators of this site have not published an official excavation report; the site is mainly known through a 1981 article in National Geographic (Sakellarakis and Sapouna-Sakellerakis 1981.) Not all agree that this was human sacrifice. Nanno Marinatos says the man supposedly sacrificed died in the earthquake that hit at the time he died. She notes that this earthquake destroyed the building, and killed the two Minoans who supposedly sacrificed him. She also argues that the building was not a temple and that the evidence for sacrifice "is far from ... conclusive." Dennis Hughes concurs and argues that the platform where the man lay was not necessarily an altar, and the blade was probably a spearhead that may not have been placed on the young man, but could have fallen during the earthquake from shelves or an upper floor.

At the sanctuary-complex of Fournou Korifi, fragments of a human skull were found in the same room as a small hearth, cooking-hole, and cooking-equipment. This skull has been interpreted as the remains of a sacrificed victim.

Excavations at Knossos uncovered additional mass burials, possibly revealing the practice of child sacrifice as well. The British School at Athens, led by Peter Warren, excavated a mass grave of sacrifices, particularly children. The findings also suggest they were victims of cannibalism.

clear evidence that their flesh was carefully cut away, much in the manner of sacrificed animals. In fact the bones of slaughtered sheep were found with those of the children...Moreover, as far as the bones are concerned, the children appear to have been in good health. Startling as it may seem, the available evidence so far points to an argument that the children were slaughtered and their flesh cooked and possibly eaten in a sacrifice ritual made in the service of a nature deity to assure an annual renewal of fertility.

In the "North House" at Knossos, the bones of at least four children (who had been in good health) were found which bore signs that "they were butchered in the same way the Minoans slaughtered their sheep and goats, suggesting that they had been sacrificed and eaten. The senior Cretan archaeologist Nikolaos Platon was so horrified at this suggestion that he insisted the bones must be those of apes, not humans."

The bones, found by Peter Warren, date to Late Minoan IB (1580–1490 BC), before the Myceneans arrived (in LM IIIA, c. 1320–1200 BC) according to Paul Rehak and John G. Younger. Dennis Hughes and Rodney Castleden argue that these bones were deposited as a 'secondary burial'. Secondary burial is the not-uncommon practice of burying the dead twice: immediately following death, and then again after the flesh is gone from the skeleton. The main weakness of this argument is that it does not explain the type of cuts and knife marks upon the bones.

== Legacy in Mycenaean and classical Greek tradition ==
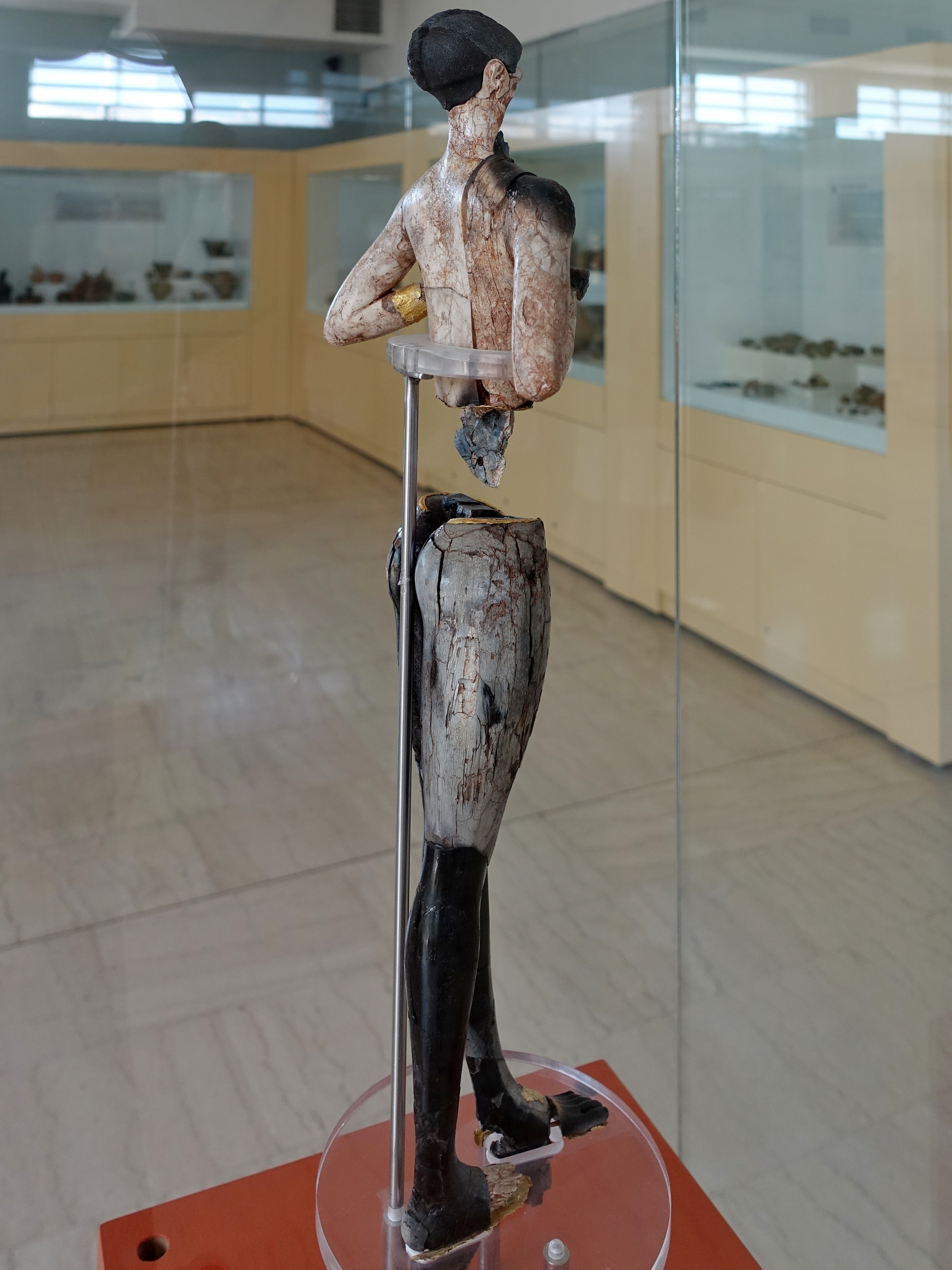
The Palaikastro Kouros, c. 1450 BC, possibly a cult image of the "young god"

The most notable legends placed on Crete in the much later Ancient Greek myths are the upbringing of Zeus, placed around Mount Ida by many ancient sources, and the story of King Minos, his labyrinth built for Minos by Daedalus, and the Minotaur, who was eventually killed by Theseus. Some sources say Zeus was born on Mount Ida, or at Dicte (which may have been the ancient name for Mount Petsofas), though others put the birth at places on the mainland. It is no longer common for scholars to relate the labyrinth myth to the experience of later Greeks encountering the complicated multi-level ruins of Knossos. The possible connection between the Minoan "young god" and the youth of Zeus remains a matter of scholarly interest.

Walter Burkert warns, "To what extent one can and must differentiate between Minoan and Mycenaean religion is a question which has not yet found a conclusive answer". Burkert suggests that useful parallels will be found in the relations between Etruscan and Archaic Greek culture and religion, or between Roman and Hellenistic culture. Minoan religion has not been transmitted in its own language, and the uses literate Greeks later made of surviving Cretan mythemes, after centuries of purely oral transmission, have transformed the meager sources: consider the Athenian point of view of the Theseus legend. A few Cretan names are preserved in Greek mythology, but there is no way to connect a name with an existing Minoan icon such as the familiar serpent-goddess.

However, Μ. Nilsson proposed that the origin of the Greek goddess Athena was the Minoan snake-goddess, citing that Athena was closely related with snakes.

Plutarch (The Intelligence of Animals 983) mentions the horn altar (keraton) associated with Theseus, which survived on Delos: "I saw, the Altar of Horn, celebrated as one of the Seven Wonders of the World because it needs no glue or any other binding, but is joined and fastened together, made entirely of horns taken from the right side of the head."

== See also ==
- Asterion
- Britomartis (Diktynna)
- Eileithyia
- Europa (Mythology)
- Idaea
- Korybantes
- Mount Ida
- Melissa
- Pasiphaë
- Rhea (mythology)
- Talos
- Velchanos (see also Vulcan (mythology))
