= Minoan Genius =

Mythological creature of ancient Crete

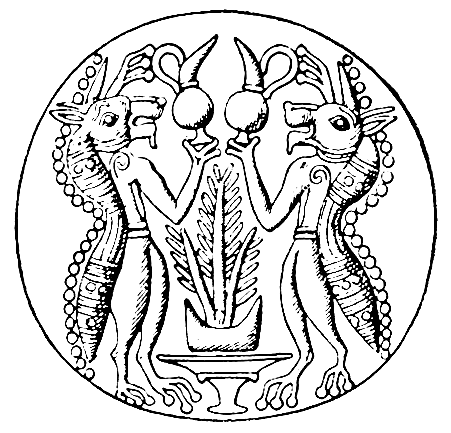
Two Minoan Genius performing a libation over an altar

The Minoan Genius is a legendary creature that was common in the Minoan art of the Bronze Age Minoan civilization in ancient Crete. It is portrayed sometimes with the head of a lion, or of a hippopotamus, or of other animals. It is mostly seen on Minoan seals, often in pairs as supporters of deities. It is also sometimes called a "demon", though it seems generally to be a benign figure in Minoan religion; the meaning is that of a daemon in later classical religions.

It is often portrayed with water vessels, such as ewers, so it seems to play a role as a libation bearer to deities.

== Mythological connections ==
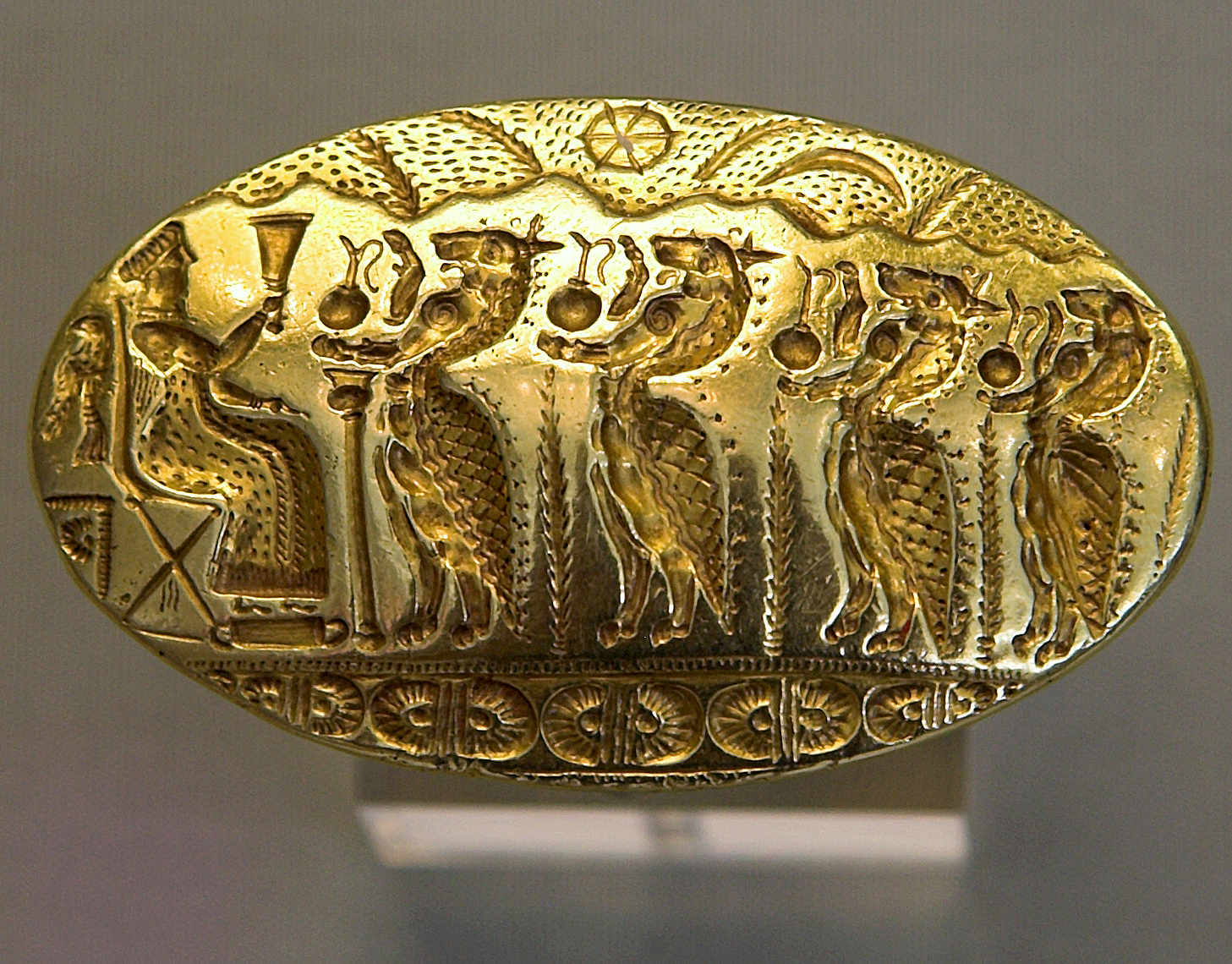
Gold ring with Sitting Goddess and row of Minoan Genius figures bearing offerings, found in context from Mycenaean Greece, but probably made in Crete, NAMA

The connections of this mythological beast seem to be with the Egyptian hippopotamus and crocodile goddess Taweret, from which it is believed to have derived. The earliest forms of the Minoan Genius derived from the Egyptian prototypes between approximately 1800 and 1700 BC. In Egypt, Taweret was the goddess of fertility, childbirth and the protection of young children, and some scholars have thought the Genius had similar functions, although the Minoan evidence for this is limited.

The other common composite mythological beast seen in Minoan art is the griffin—a widespread figure around the Ancient Near East. These may pull deities in chariots, as on the Hagia Triada Sarcophagus.

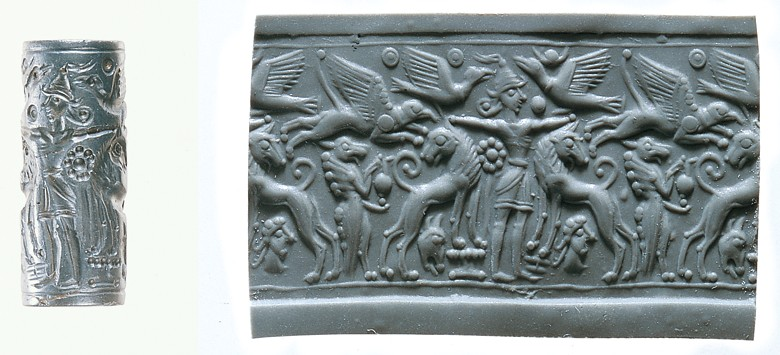
Cylinder seal and modern impression: Master of Animals between lions, griffins, Minoan Genius. Thought to be from Cyprus

Later on, the Genius also became a deity in the Mycenaean world; its representations are found widely in continental Greece.

== Sacrificial aspect ==
Weingarten writes: "The Minoan Genius is also known for carrying large beasts of all kinds to sacrifice... rarely depicted in an act of violence; though closely linked to sacrifice, the demon is only once seen to do the deed: on a seal impression from Zakro (Genius No.27 = Z 104), it slaughters a huge upright bull with sword or spear. The Genius moves indirectly on a cylinder from Kakovatos (CMS XI 208): a hero stabs an upright lion while the demon urges him on from behind."

== Bibliography ==
- C. Baurain, “Pour une autre interprétation des génies minoens,” in P. Darcque and J-C. Poursat (eds.), L’iconographie minoenne [BCH Supplement 11] (Paris 1985) 95-118.
- M. Benzi, “Minoan Genius on a LH III Pictorial Sherd from Phylakopi, Melos? Some Remarks on Religious and Ceremonial Scenes on Mycenaean Pictorial Pottery,” Pasiphae 3(2009) 9-26.
- Gill. M. A. V. 1961. The Minoan Genius: An Iconographical Study. Unpublished PhD thesis, University of Birmingham.
- Gill. M. A. V. 1964. The Minoan Genius. Mitteilungen des Deutschen Archäologischen Instituts, Athenische Abteilung 79, 1-21.
- P. Rehak, The ‘Genius’ in Late Bronze Age Glyptic: the Later Evolution of an Aegean Cult Figure (PDF file), in W. Müller (ed.), Sceaux Minoens et Mycéniens [CMS Beiheft 5] (Berlin 1995) 215-231
- C. Sambin, “Génie minoen et génie egyptien, un emprunt raisonné,” BCH 113(1989) 77-96.
- Weingarten, J. 1991. The Transformation of Egyptian Taweret into the Minoan Genius: A Study in Cultural Transmission in the Middle Bronze Age. Partille, Paul Åström Förlag.
- Weingarten J. and Hallager, E. 1993. The Five Roundels from Malia, and a Note on Two New Minoan Genii. Bulletin de correspondance hellénique 117, 1-18.
- J. Weingarten, 2013, The Arrival of Egyptian Taweret and Beset on Minoan Crete: Contact and Choice, in L. Bombardieri, A. D’Agostino, G. Guarducci, V. Orsi, S. Valentini (eds), SOMA 2012, Identity and Connectivity, Proceedings of the 16th Symposium on Mediterranean Archaeology, Florence, Italy, 1–3 March 2012, Vol..I, Bar International Series 2581 (I) 2013, 371-378.
