= Poppy goddess =

Type of large female terracotta figurine in Minoan art

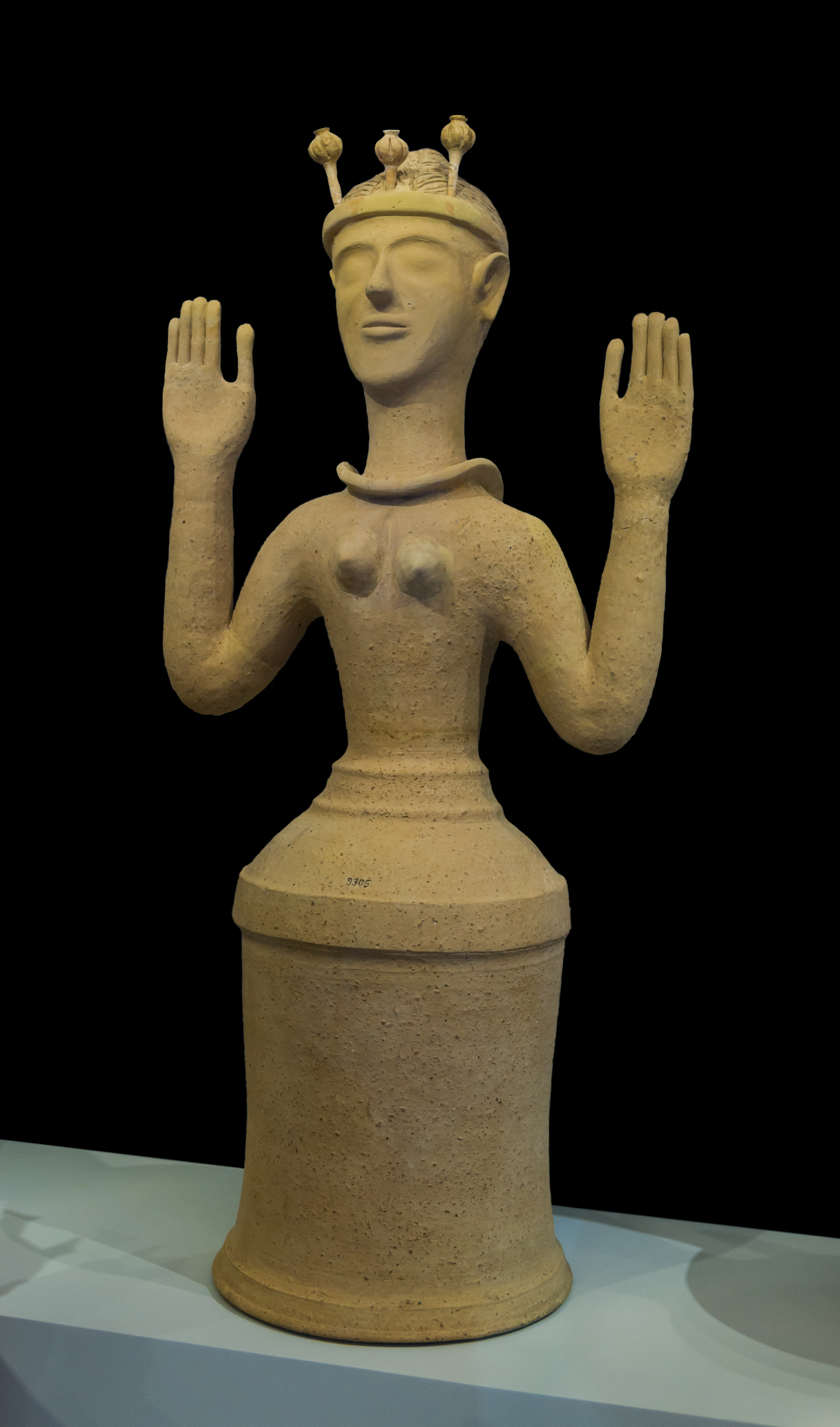
"Poppy goddess" figurine from the sanctuary at Gazi, Crete

The name poppy goddess is often used for a famous example of a distinctive type of large female terracotta figurine in Minoan art, presumably representing a goddess. It was likely used as a votive offering rather than a cult image. It was discovered in 1937 in a sanctuary at Gazi, Crete and dates to the Post-palatial period (LM III, 1400–1100 BC). It is now held at the Heraklion Archaeological Museum.

== Description ==
The figurine is named after the shape of the terminals rising from the diadem, which have been identified as opium poppy seedheads. The seedheads are moveable, and carved with grooves resembling those created to extract opium from seedheads. The figure's eyes are closed and the lips are slightly parted, as if in a drug-induced sleep or trance. It has a round skirt, shaped like a vessel, which was formed on a potter's wheel. Afterwards the body was hand-sculpted while the clay was still malleable. The hands are raised with the palms facing forwards.

== Significance ==
=== Emergence of 'goddess with upraised arms' figures ===
Island-wide destruction, accompanied by a drastic societal shift, occurred at the end of LM IB (c. 1625–1470 BC). This period marked the end of the Neopalatial society. All palaces except for one at Knossos fell out of use, and increased contact with Mycenean Greece led to the emergence of a hybrid Minoan-Mycenean culture, a ruling Mycenean elite at Knossos, and the introduction of Linear B. Peak sanctuaries and lustral basins also fell out of use, and new shrines were built in the simpler, bench-shrine type exemplified by the Shrine of the Double Axes at Knossos.

Minoan pottery figurines began to be found in public sanctuaries, not only in palace-sanctuaries, as was typical in earlier periods. The 'goddess with upraised arms' pottery style, which the poppy goddess belongs to, also appears at this time. These figures were found in shrines at Knossos, Gournia, and Myrtos, and also in sanctuaries at Gortys and Prinias. The figures are typically wearing diadems affixed with various symbols, such as the horns of consecration, disks, birds, snakes, and the seeds of opium poppies. Most are unpainted, but some bear traces of white, red, and yellow paint. Holes were often made at the top of the head, which may have helped the firing process, and some have openings in the ears, which may have symbolized— or facilitated— the goddess listening to prayers. These figures may have represented individual divinities, but likely embody multiple aspects of a single mother goddess.

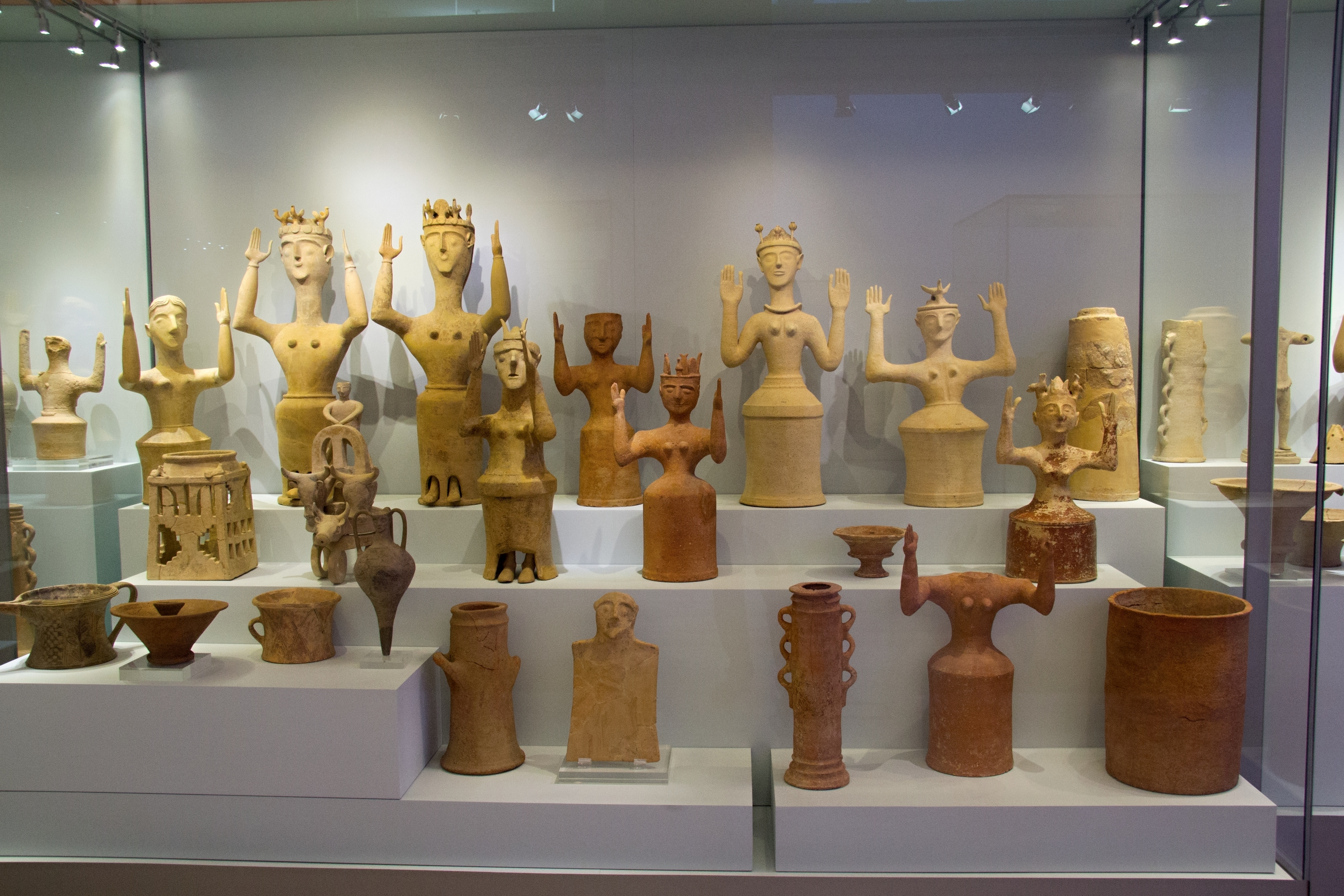
Terracottas from Gazi in AM Heraklion, 1300-1100 BC, including the poppy goddess

Walter Bukert believed that the poppy goddess' raised hands indicate that the figurine depicts a goddess; he speculated that it may be an "epiphany gesture." It is possible that the goddess is giving a greeting or blessing, praying, or it may symbolize her appearance on earth in human form. The gesture may also be depicting a moment of ecstasy or trance brought on by the usage of opium.

=== Significance of poppies ===
Opium poppies were cultivated on Crete, and opium was likely consumed or inhaled by ancient Minoans. Opium was likely consumed in a medicinal context for pain management, and in a ritualistic or cultic context to bring on a state of ecstasy. The poppy goddess figurine was found in a sanctuary containing remnants of coal and multiple cylindrical objects likely used to inhale opium smoke.

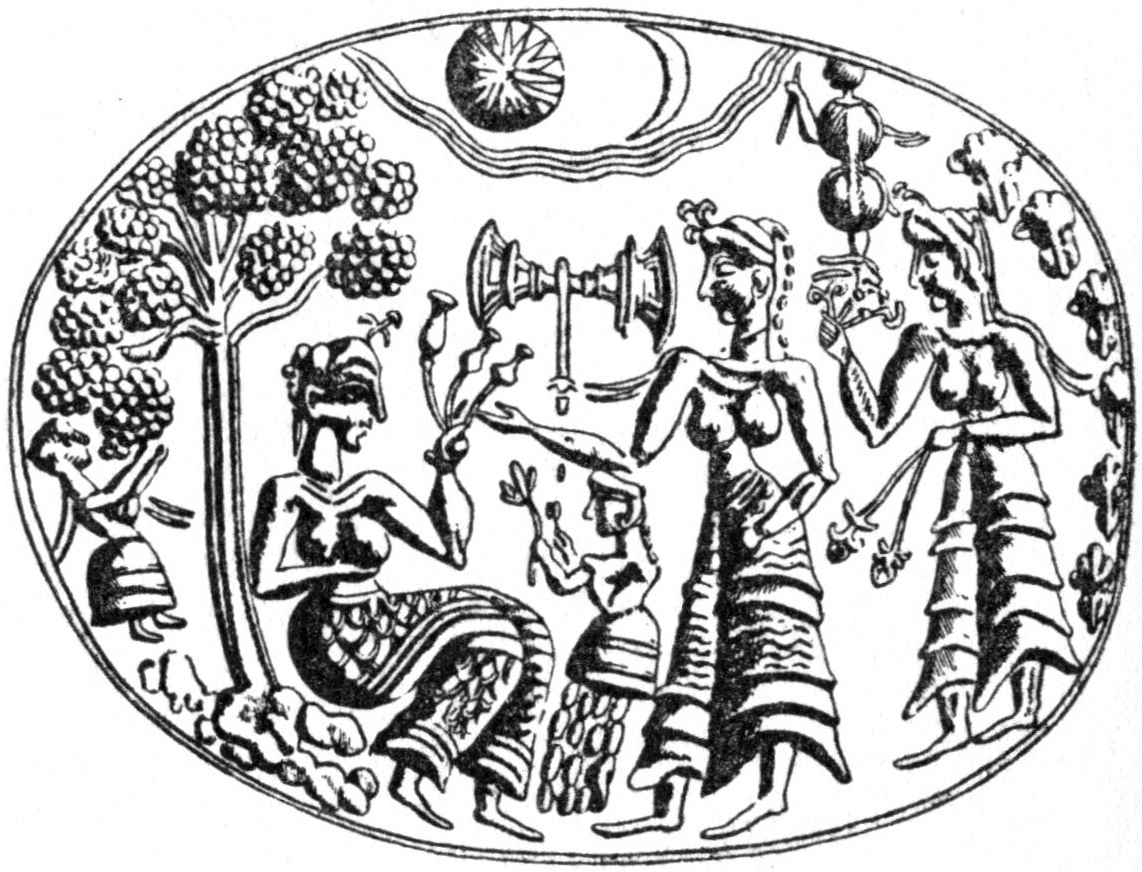
Drawing of a gold ring found at Mycenae showing a seated goddess bearing three poppy seedcases

In Mycenean Greece, poppies were associated the goddess Demeter, potentially connecting her to the poppy goddess. Demeter's association with poppies is attested by writers such as Theocritus, and she was occasionally depicted bearing sheaves and poppies in art and on coinage. Karl Kerenyi asserted that poppies were connected to a Cretan cult that was absorbed into the Eleusinian Mysteries in Classical Greece: "It seems probable that the Great Mother Goddess who bore the names Rhea and Demeter, brought the poppy with her from her Cretan cult to Eleusis and it is almost certain that in the Cretan cult sphere opium was prepared from poppies." Additionally, poppies were used in Greco-Roman myths as offerings to the dead.

The poppy goddess may have also been associated with, or identified with, an unnamed goddess found on golden seals from Mycenae and Boeotia. One signet ring depicts a female divinity seated under a tree, holding poppies that were presented to her by a worshipper; the other two worshippers hold lilies and flowers. The Minoan labrys is also depicted, alongside the sun and moon. It has been proposed that this divinity is a prehistoric mother goddess or nature goddess. British classicist and scholar, Jane Ellen Harrison, proposed that the imagery of the gathered poppies in the goddess' hands are associated with the Minoan "Mother of the Gods".

== See also ==
- Great Goddess
- Poppy (botany)
- Sign of Tanit
