= Horns of Consecration =

Symbol used in the Minoan civilisation

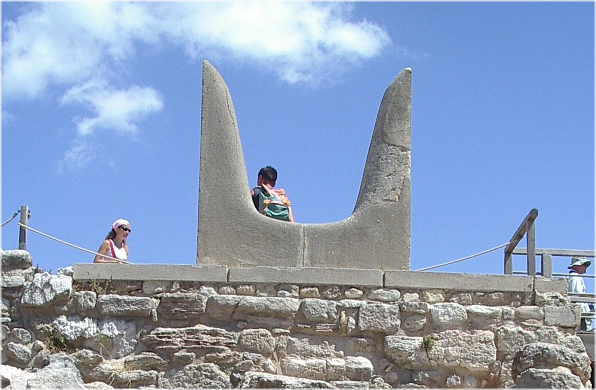
The reconstructed horns of consecration at Knossos

Horns of Consecration is a term coined by Sir Arthur Evans for the symbol, common in Minoan civilization, that is usually thought to represent the horns of the sacred bull. Evans said they were "a more or less conventionalised article of ritual furniture derived from the actual horns of the sacrificial oxen".

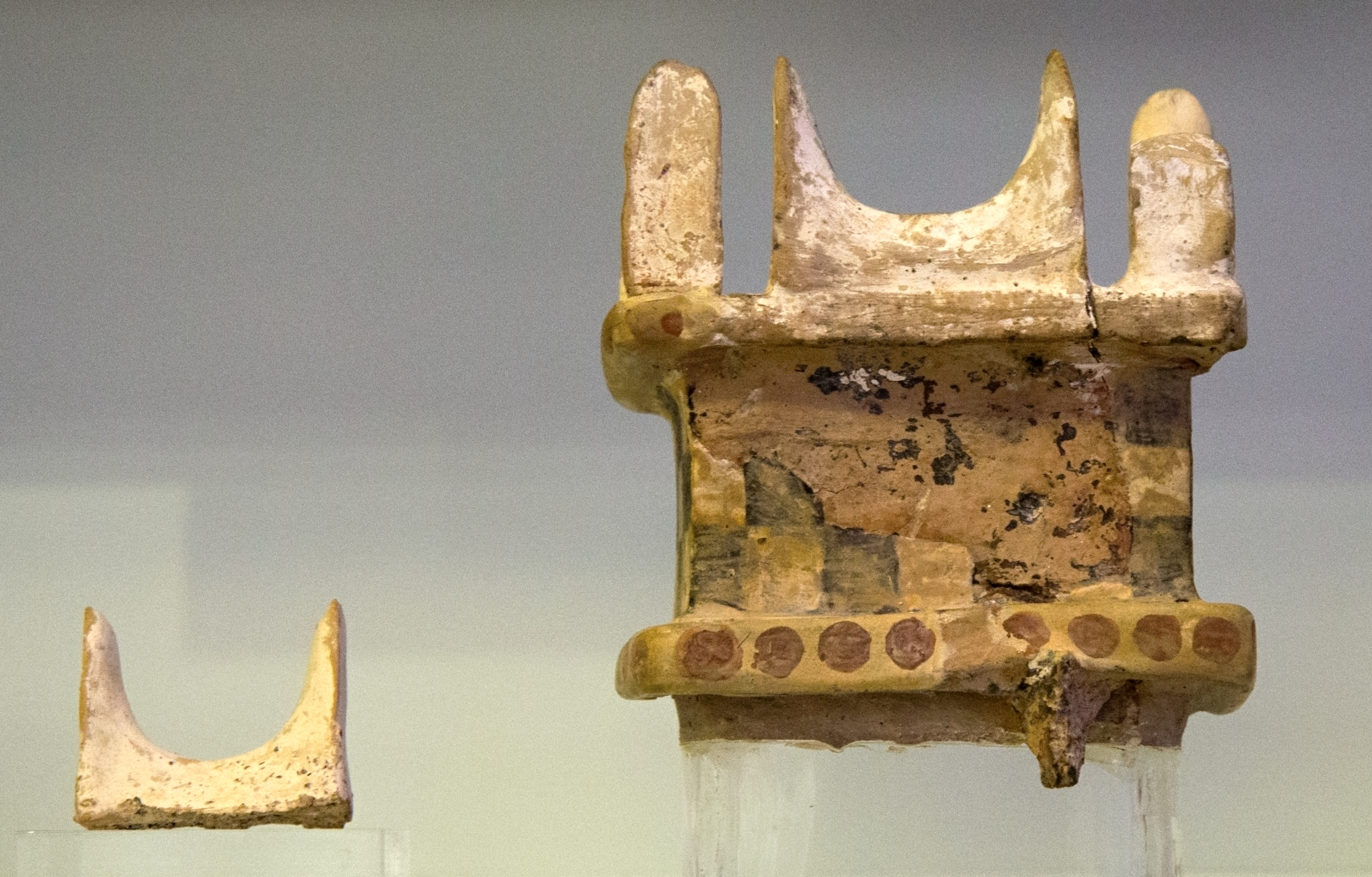
Small clay horns on a model building

The porous limestone horns of consecration on the East Propyleia at Knossos (illustration, right) are restorations. Horns of consecration in stone or clay were placed on the roofs of buildings in Neopalatial Crete, or on tombs or shrines, probably as signs of sanctity of the structure. The symbol also appears on Minoan sealstones, often accompanied by the labrys (double axe) and bucranium (decorative bull skull sculpture), which are part of the iconography of Minoan bull sacrifice. Horns of consecration are among the cultic images painted on the Minoan coffins called larnakes, sometimes in isolation; they may have flowers between the horns, or the labrys.

== Astronomy ==
A suggestion for a practical use for the large examples on the top of buildings, is that they were used as frames for sighting the movements of heavenly bodies, for example the constellation of Orion, which may have represented the "young god" of Minoan religion.

== Comparisons ==
Evans compared the Horns of Consecration with the four "horns of the altar" of Hebrew ritual, and with the altar with a horned cult object depicted on the stele from Teima in northern Arabia, now conserved at the Louvre.

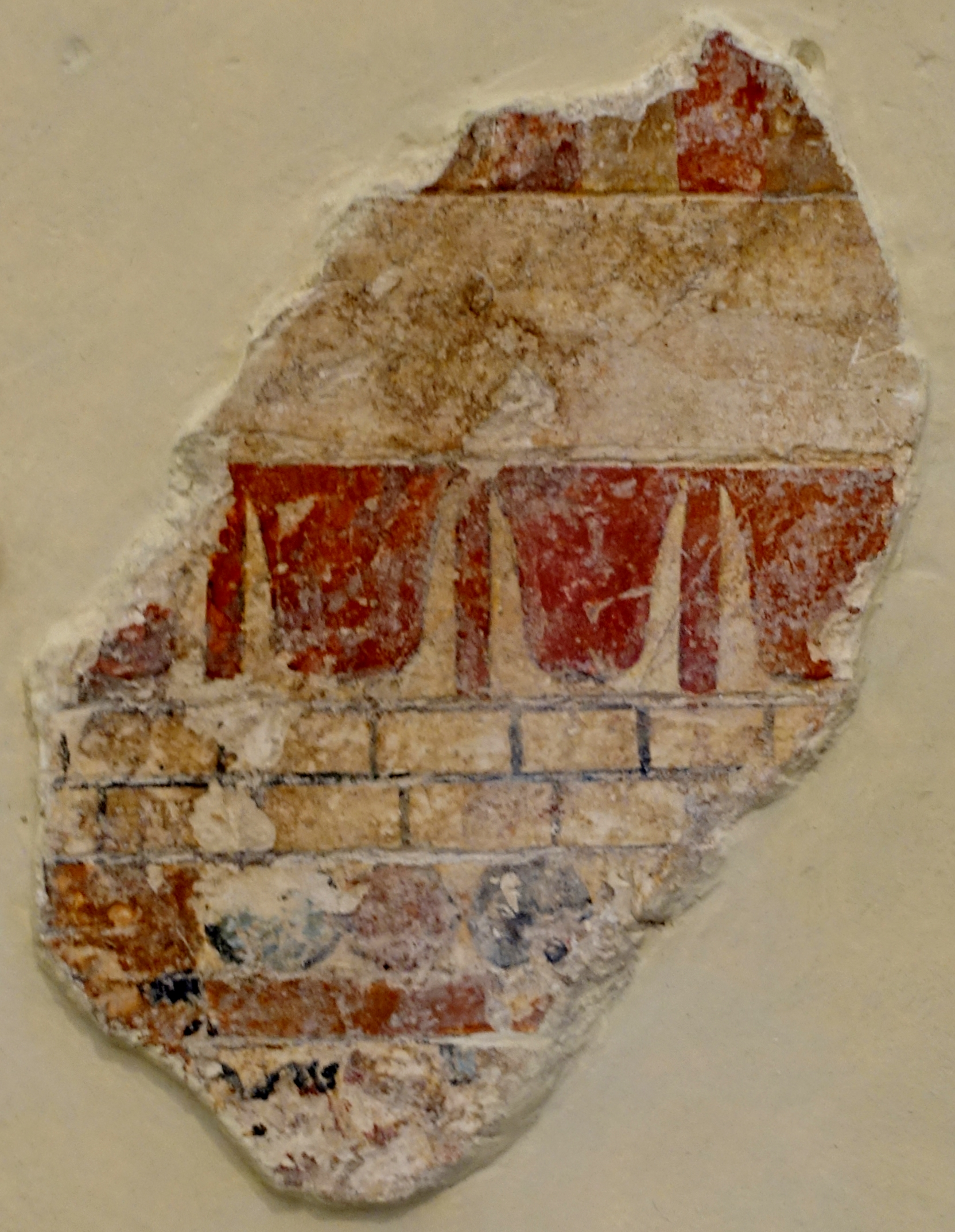
Miniature fresco fragment, Knossos

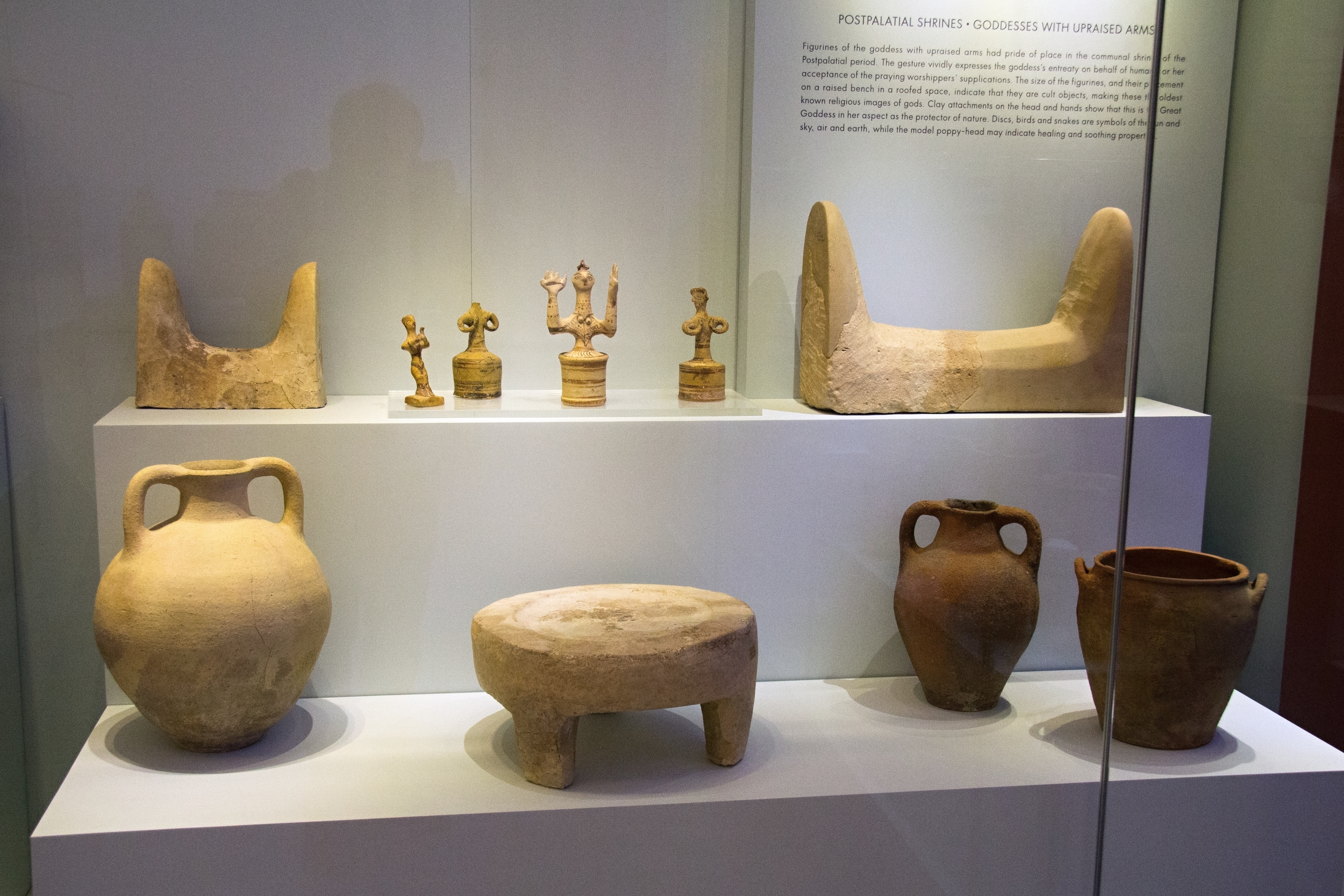
From shrines on Crete, Postpalatial period, AMH

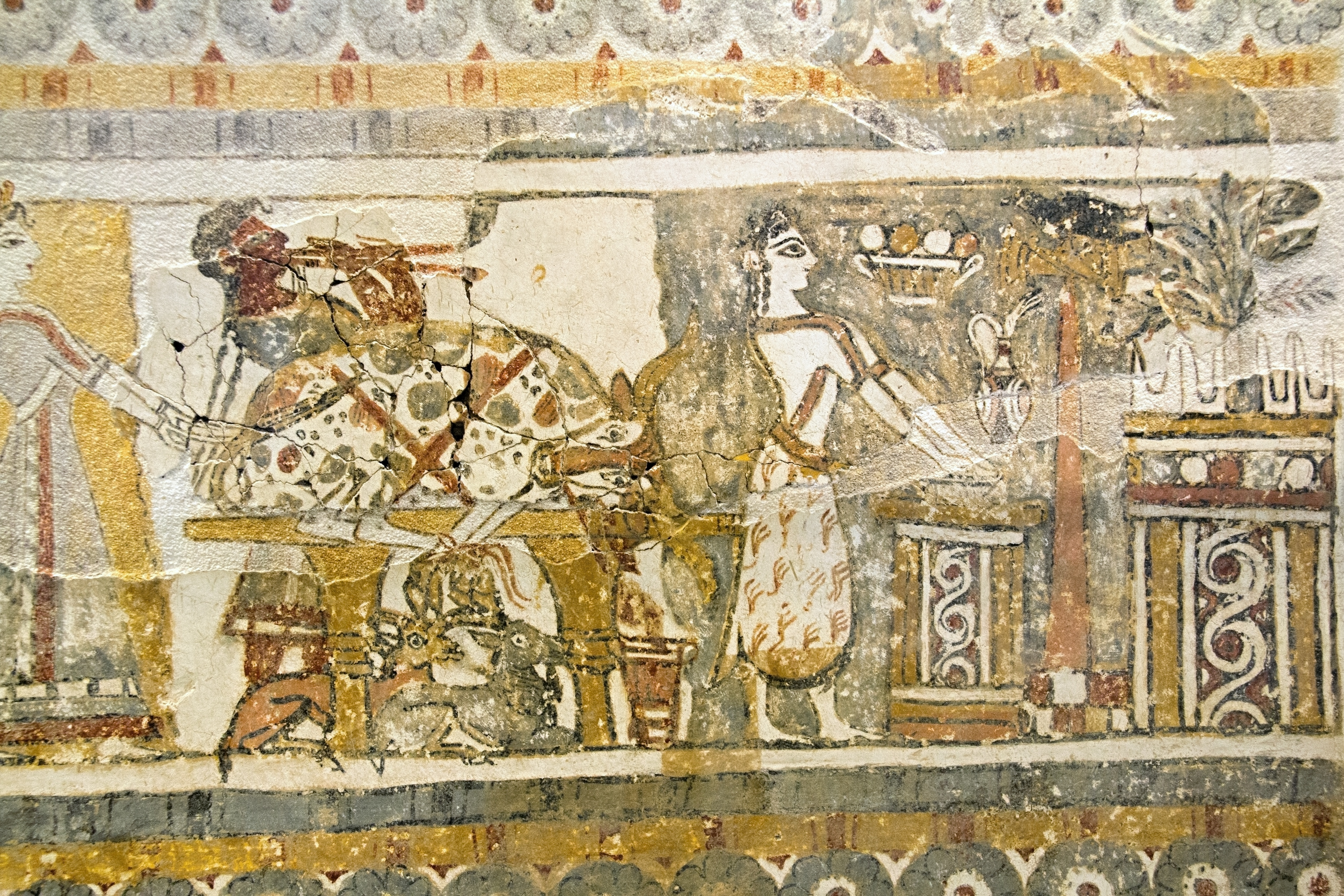
topping a tomb on the Hagia Triada sarcophagus

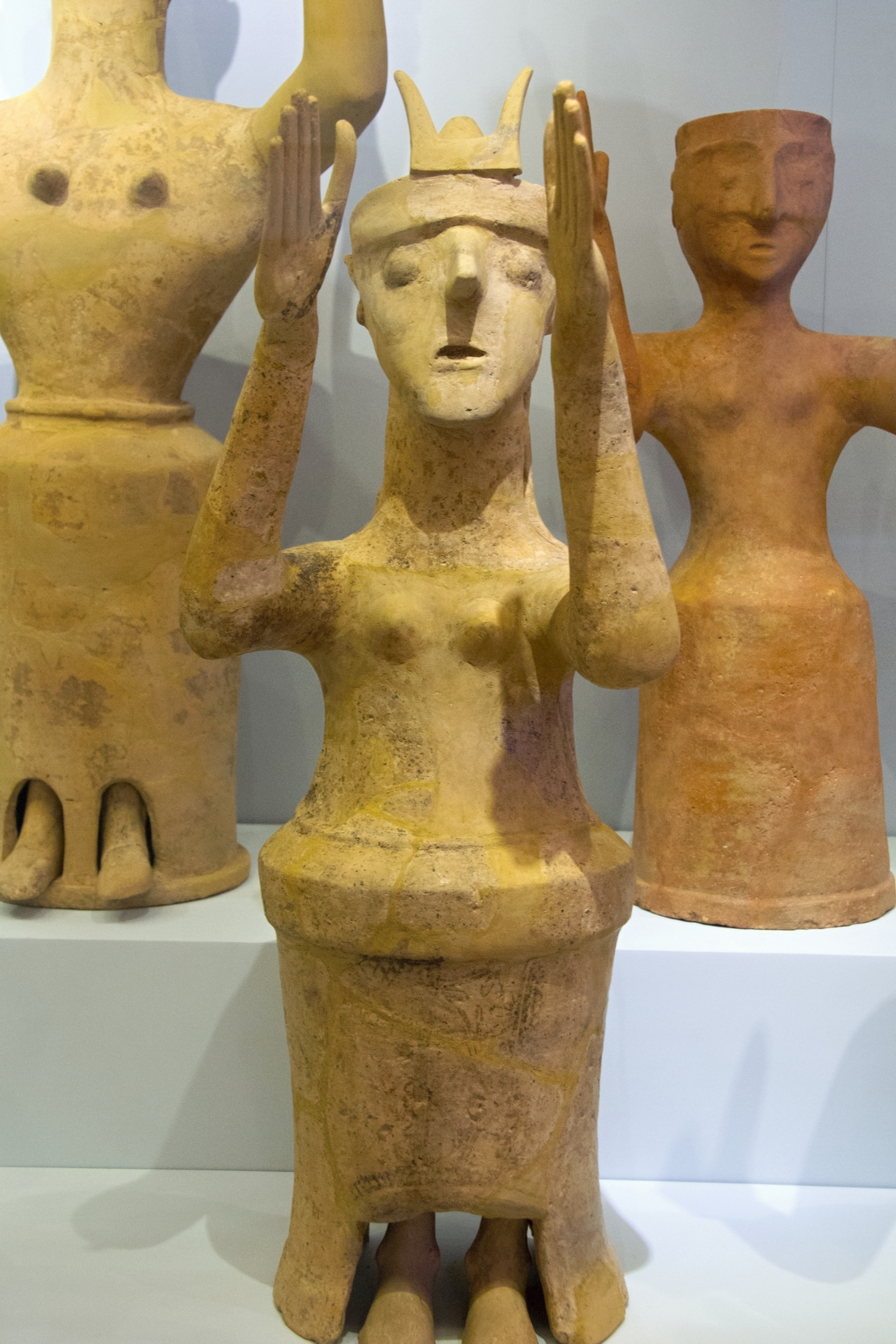
Crowning terracotta goddess figure, Gazi, 1300-1100 BC, AMH
