= Hans Georg Wunderlich =

German geologist (1928–1974)

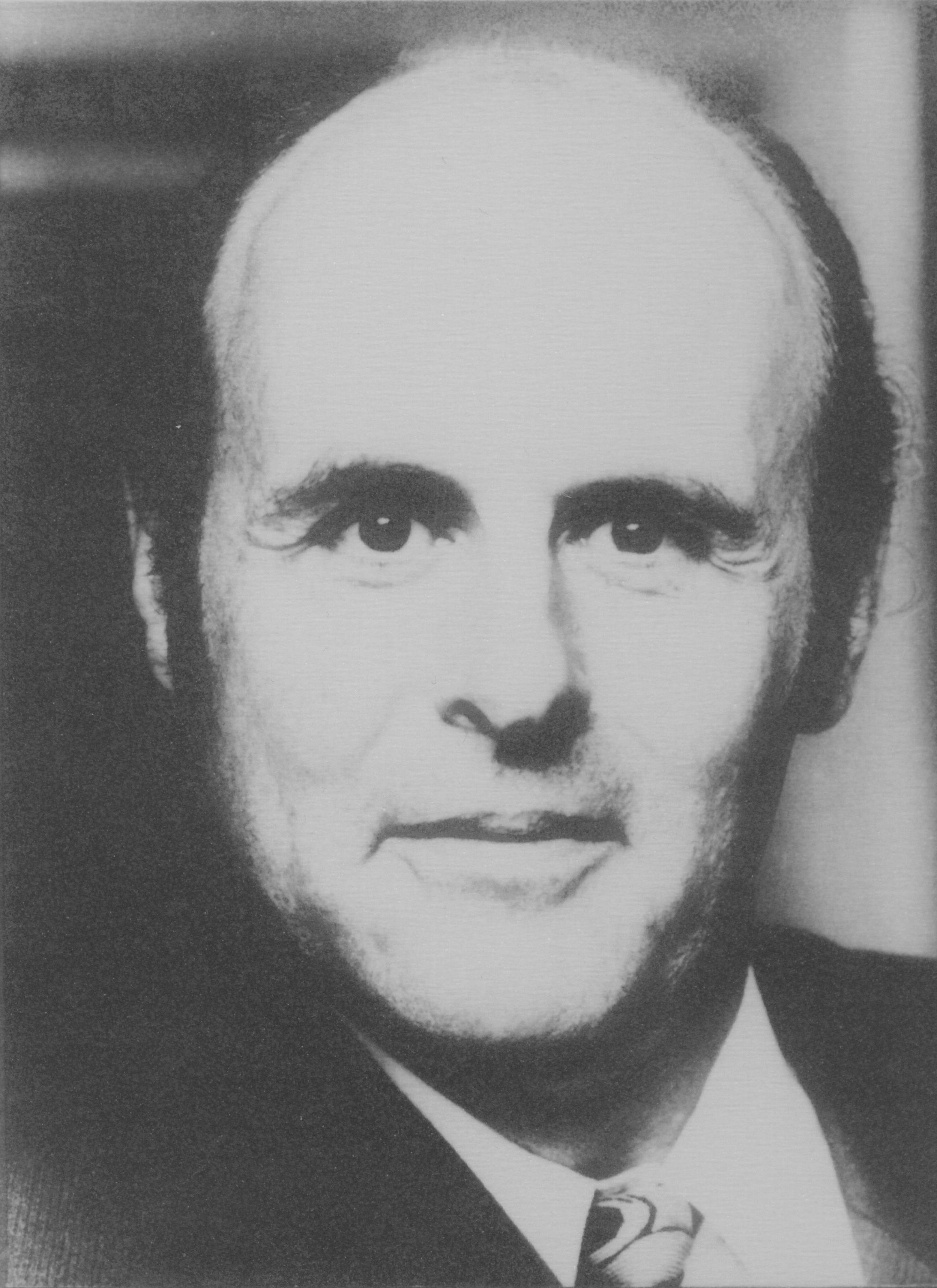
Hans Georg Wunderlich

Hans Georg Wunderlich (19 January 1928 – 28 May 1974) was a German geologist.

== Life and work ==
Wunderlich studied geology in Bonn and Göttingen. In 1952 he was awarded his doctorate in Göttingen (Contributions to the geology of the Northern Harz Boundary Fault in the Bad Harzburg area) and from 1957 he taught in Göttingen. In 1963 he became a professor in Göttingen, in 1970 professor of geology and palaeontology in Stuttgart.

He dealt with geotectonics and orogenesis, where he was a supporter of the theory of plate tectonics. From 1969 he was main coordinator for the Priority Program of the Geodynamics of the Mediterranean region of the German Research Foundation.

== Work on the archaeology of Crete ==
During his geological studies in Crete he became aware of the palace of Knossos. He disagreed with the established thesis of Sir Arthur Evans that the Minoan civilization had been extremely peaceful, pointing instead to evidence of a pronounced cult of the dead similar to that of the ancient Egyptian culture of the Old Kingdom.

In the book Wohin der Stier Europa trug (1972), he analysed the Minoan excavations from the perspective of geology and identified many contradictions in Evans' theories; for example, the devices called baths are completely unsuitable for bathing, since their sheathing is made of a water-soluble material and there is no drainage. He considered the light wells to be ventilation ducts.

He also argued that it was unlikely that the "palaces" and "villas" were permanently inhabited, as there was no water supply there; he did not think that the wells that had been found were deep enough and therefore interpreted them as cisterns. Wunderlich therefore assumed that the population lived in the plains and the so-called villas and palaces were mortuary temples.

Wunderlich's criticism provoked a long-standing scientific dispute, but today it is regarded as an outsider's opinion and is considered largely refuted.

== Works (in chronological order) ==
- Tektonik und Metamorphose der Bündener Schiefer in der Umgebung des Gotthardmassivs (1957, with W. Pleßmann)
- Aufbau und Altersverhältnis der Tektonik- und Metamorphose-Vorgängen in Bündenerschiefer Nordtessins und Graubündens (1958)
- Deckenbau, Faltung und Lineation in den Ligurischen Alpen und im angrenzenden Apennin (1958)
- Zur Tektonik und Metamorphose der Apuanischen Alpen, Akademie der Wissenschaften Göttingen, Math.-Naturwiss. Klasse, 1960, S. 118–158
- Wesen und Ursachen der Gebirgsbildung, BI Hochschultaschenbücher (1966)
- with Erich Bederke: Atlas zur Geologie, Bibliographisches Institut (BI) Mannheim, (1968)
- Einführung in die Geologie, BI Hochschultaschenbücher, 2 Bände (1968)
- Wohin der Stier Europa trug: Kretas Geheimnis und das Erwachen des Abendlandes (1972); translated into English by Richard Winston as The Secret of Crete (1974)
- Bau der Erde. Geologie der Kontinente und Meere, BI Hochschultaschenbücher, 2 Bände (1973, 1975)
- Die Steinzeit ist noch nicht zu Ende. Eine Psycho-Archäologie des Menschen (1974)
- Das neue Bild der Erde. Faszinierende Entdeckungen der modernen Geologie (1975)
