= Hagia Triada Sarcophagus =

Sarcophagus displayed at the Heraklion Archaeological Museum in Crete, Greece

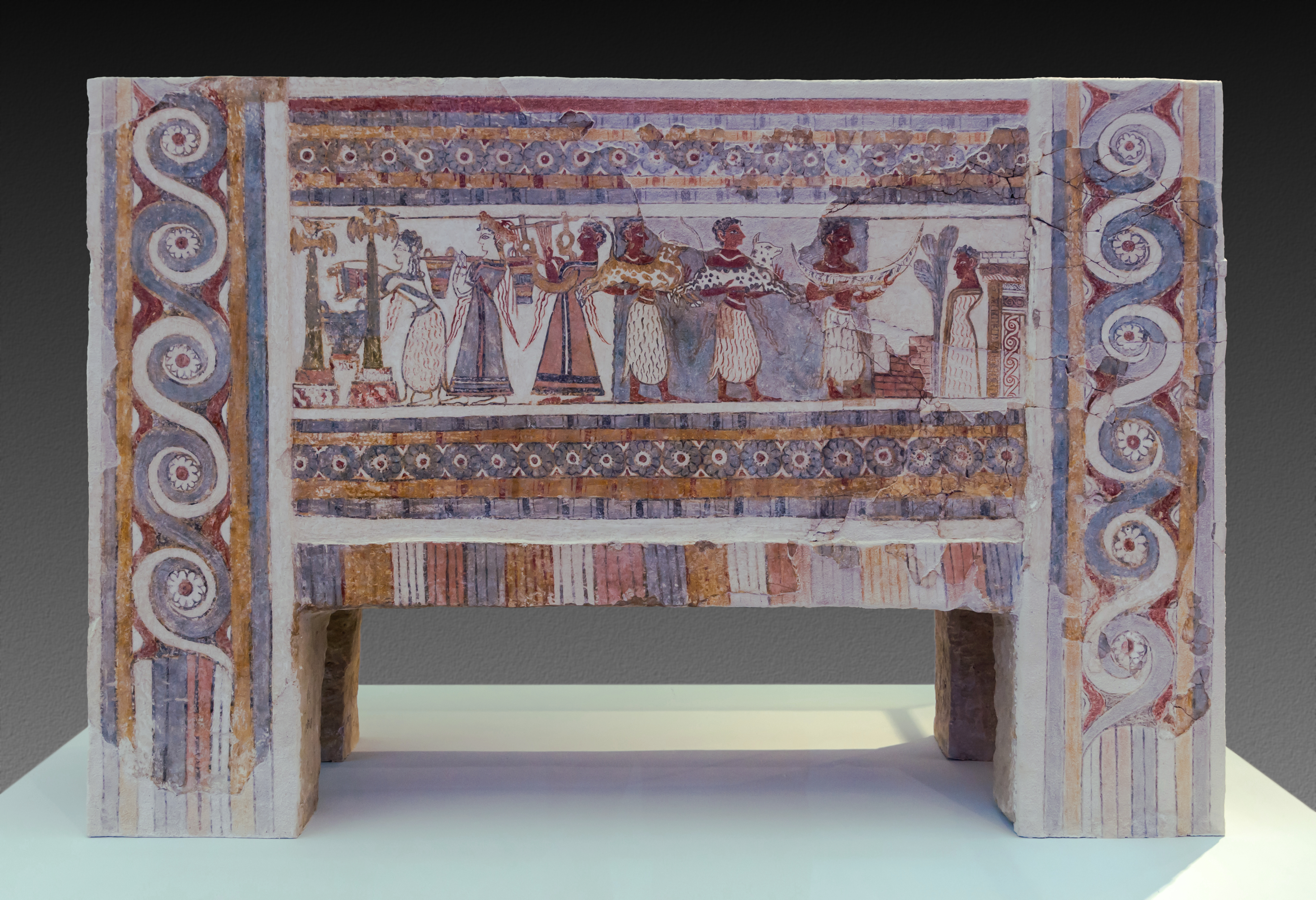
- Material: Limestone
- Size: length: 137 cm
- Created: c. 1400 BC
- Discovered: 1903; Faistos, Crete, Greece
- Present location: Heraklion, Crete, Greece

The Hagia Triada Sarcophagus is a late Minoan 137 cm (54 in)-long limestone sarcophagus, dated to around 1400 BC or some decades later, excavated from a chamber tomb at Hagia Triada, Crete in 1903 and now on display at the Heraklion Archaeological Museum (AMH) in Crete, Greece.

Uniquely for such a piece from this date on Crete, it is coated in plaster and painted in fresco on all faces. Unlike the ancient Egyptians, the Minoans only used frescoes to decorate palaces and houses for the enjoyment of the living, not for funerary use. It is the only limestone sarcophagus of its era discovered to date; there are a number of smaller terracotta "ash-chests" (larnax), painted far more crudely, usually in a single colour. It is the only object with a series of narrative scenes of Minoan funerary ritual (later sarcophagi found in the Aegean were decorated with abstract designs and patterns). It was probably originally used for the burial of a prince.

It provides probably the most comprehensive iconography of a pre-Homeric thysiastikis ceremony and one of the best pieces of information on noble burial customs when Crete was under Mycenaean rule, combining features of Minoan and Mycenaean style and subject matter, as well as probable influence from Ancient Egyptian religion.

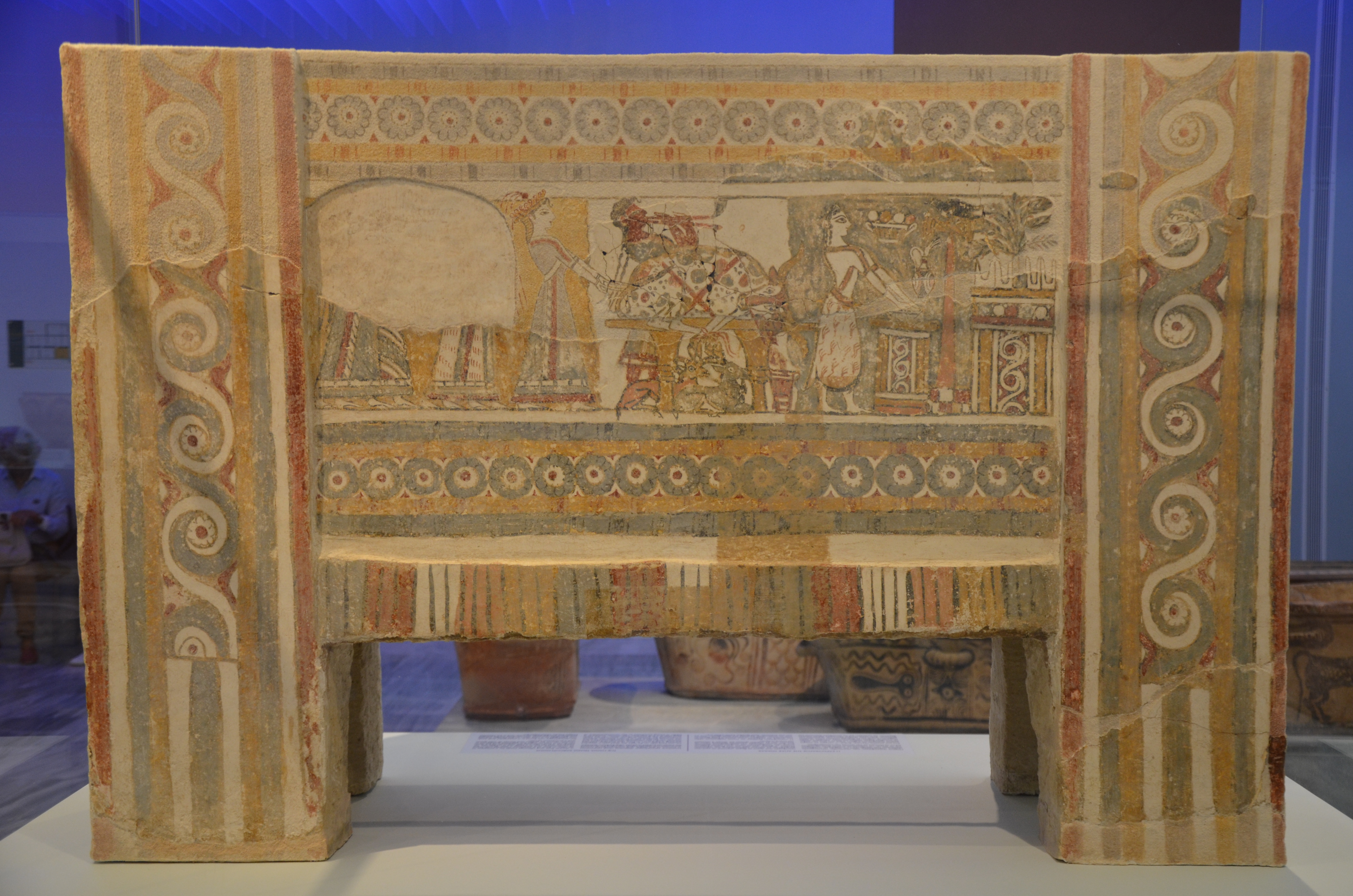
The other face

== Discovery and Dating ==
The Hagia Triada Sarcophagus was discovered on June 23, 1903 by Roberto Paribeni on a hilltop containing a late Bronze Age cemetery near the site of Hagia Triada. This funerary structure, referred to as tomb 4, is located near two tholos tombs (A and B) dating from the Prepalatial period, close to a larnax burial area, and close to another tomb from the Neopalatial or Postpalatial period.

The sarcophagus was discovered in a burial chamber, or rather a small structure that served as a tomb, measuring 3.8 × 4.2 m (9.8 ft × 13 ft). The walls of the structure, which were preserved at a height ranging from 65 cm (25 in) to 1.20 m (3.2 ft), stop at ground level and thus have no proper foundation. This structure, with its thick walls made of small irregular stones, is the only example of this type in the entire Minoan and Mycenaean world. The walls show no traces of frescoes. The first excavations did not reveal traces of a roof, but the stones of the structure suggest that they could have served as a base for a wooden structure, perhaps similar to the building depicted on the sarcophagus itself. Contemporary with the Mycenaean presence in Crete, the building combines traditional elements of Minoan architecture with Mycenaean forms. Tomb 4 is similar to two Mycenaean tombs found at Farsala, in northern Greece. A similar tomb, closer and dating from the same period, was discovered at Archanes. Like tombs A and B from Mycenae, the tombs at Hagia Triada and Archanes were reserved for a closed social group.

== Description ==
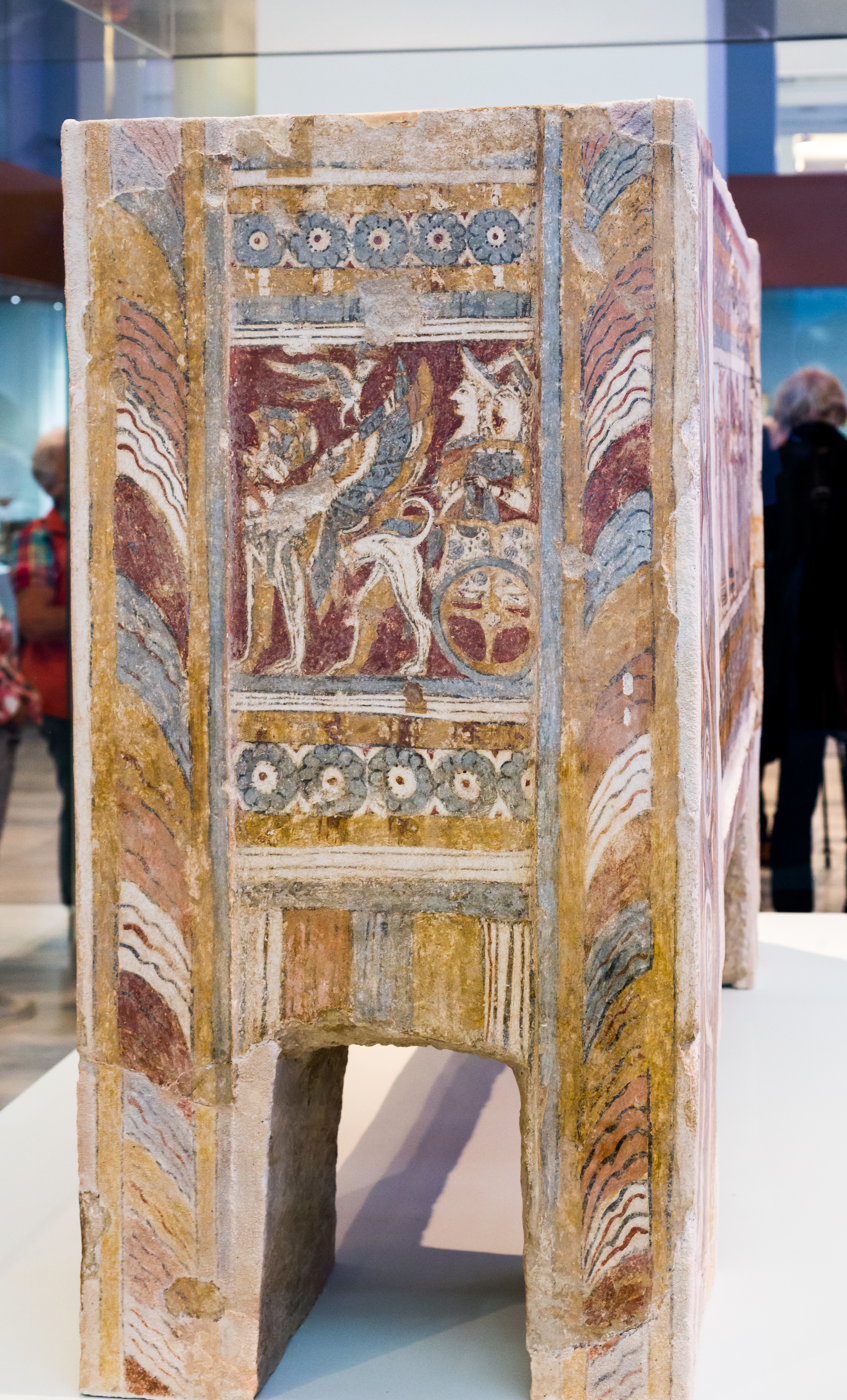
Side view

All four faces of the sarcophagus are fully painted in several colours, using the fresco technique otherwise only found in Minoan paintings on walls, and sometimes floors and ceilings. Each of the long sides has a long section with a narrative figure scene of a religious ritual. One of the short end sides has a roughly square section with a scene of a chariot with two figures, presumably goddesses as they are pulled by a griffin (possibly two), above which hovers a large bird. The other end has two scenes, the upper almost entirely missing, but probably with a procession of male figures. The lower scene again has two figures in a chariot pulled by two horses.

These scenes are surrounded by ornamental borders covering the remaining areas. These are comparable to the decorative borders around Minoan wall-paintings, although larger in relation to the figures. The ornament includes scrolls, stripes, and rows of rosettes. Immediately above and below the narrative scenes on the long sides are thin blank (white) strips, into which some elements of the scenes intrude at the top. On the sides the strips are a mixture of colours.

Unlike larnakes, the sarcophagus has no lid, and none was apparently intended. It also has drainage holes.

=== Narrative scenes ===
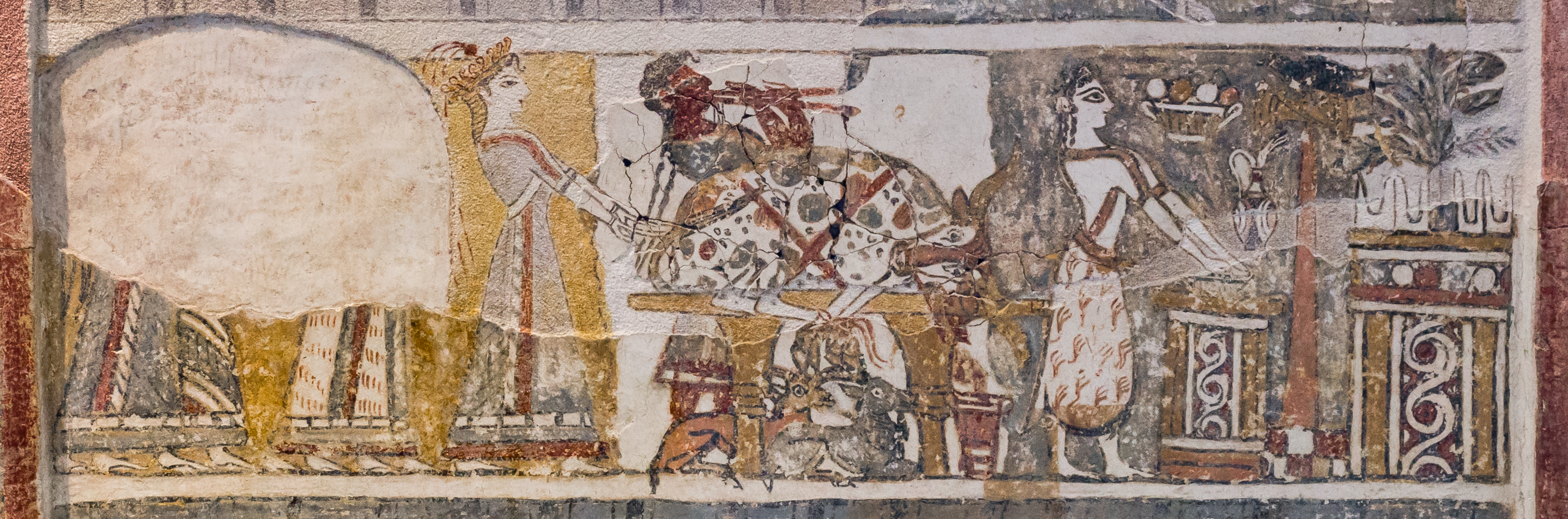
Scene on the "rear" side, with bull sacrifice

The long painted scenes show the stages of the sacred ceremony which was performed at the burial of important personages. In the centre of one of the long sides of the sarcophagus (here called the "rear" side, purely for convenience) is a scene with a sacrifice of a bull, who is lying tethered on a table-like altar. Under the altar are at least two smaller animals, variously described as calves, deer or goats, possibly terracotta models like those being carried on the other side, or real ones waiting to be sacrificed. Behind this is a male figure playing the aulos double flute. He is painted red in the usual Minoan convention, unlike the white females.

At the left of the scene are five female figures in profile, facing the altar. Only the front one is complete, as a chunk of the plaster is missing, and the others are missing their upper bodies. The front figure has a large crown with long plumes, probably of feathers. She holds her hands in front of her, with open palms. This section has a yellow background, which changes to white at the altar. Blood pouring from the altar table is falling into a bucket or rhyton at the right of this section.

In the final section the background colour changes again to a blue that is now rather muddy. A female figure with a skirt or apron of shaggy animal hide faces away from the bull towards the right. She holds out both arms over a bowl on a pedestal or altar. Shown as in the air beside her are a decorated vase and a bowl with fruit-like round objects. In front of this is a pole with a labrys double axe at the top and a black bird sitting on this. This has a chequered base; or perhaps this is a step up to the final element, either an altar or a building (in which case probably the tomb). This is topped by four Horns of Consecration symbols, and also a tree. Both the structures in this part of the scene have decoration including spiral scrolls and stripes that is comparable to that on the borders on the sarcophagus.

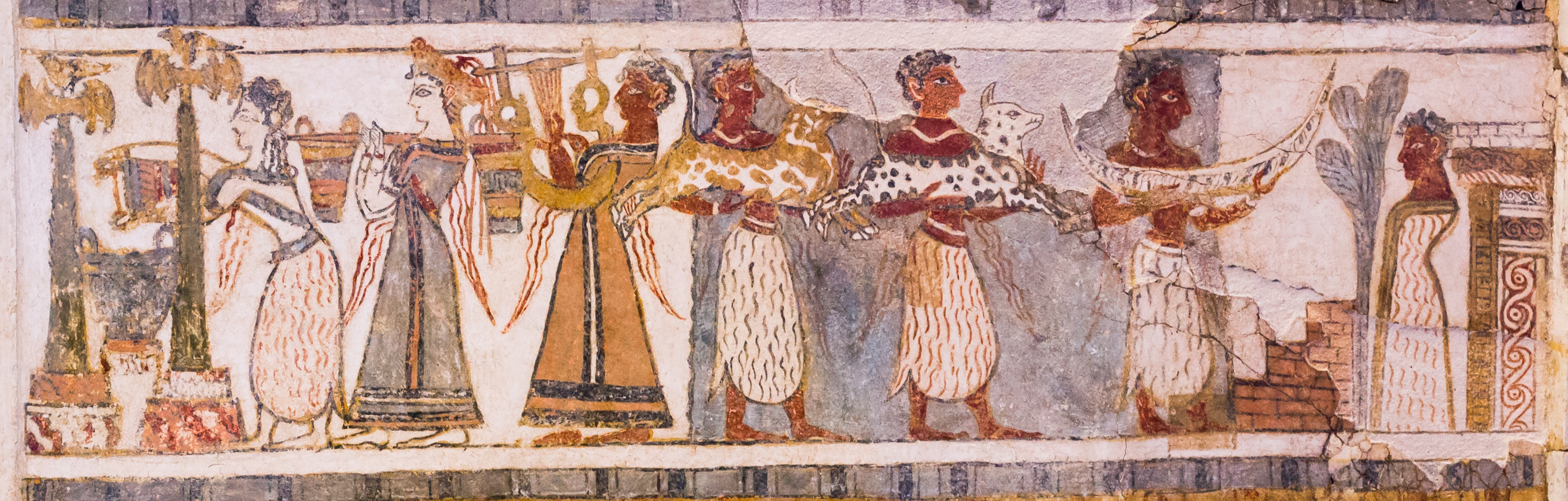
Scene on the "front" side, with offerings

The narrative scene on the second long side (called here the "front") is also divided into three zones with different background colours. On the left, with a white background, there are three left-facing figures. Firstly a woman wearing a hide skirt apron is emptying a decorated vase or bucket into a large metal cauldron; this might be blood from the sacrifice on the other side, possibly as an invocation to the soul of the deceased. The cauldron appears to sit on a tripod, and stands between two poles on decorated bases. The poles are topped with labrys symbols and a bird each above that. Behind the first woman a richly-dressed woman wearing a crown is carrying two vessels on a yoke over her shoulders. Behind her a man dressed in a long robe is playing a seven-string lyre. This is the earliest picture of the lyre known in Greece.

In the central section, with a blue background, three men wearing hide aprons or kilts face right and carry models of animals (probably bulls) and a boat. They seem to be approaching the only figure in the right-hand section, with a white background. He is a static left-facing male figure without arms and feet, who wears a full-length hide cloak-like garment, with gold edging; it is presumed that he represents the dead man receiving gifts (and the boat for his journey to the next world). The dead man stands outside what is presumably the elaborate entrance to his tomb, beside a tree, and three steps.

== Age ==
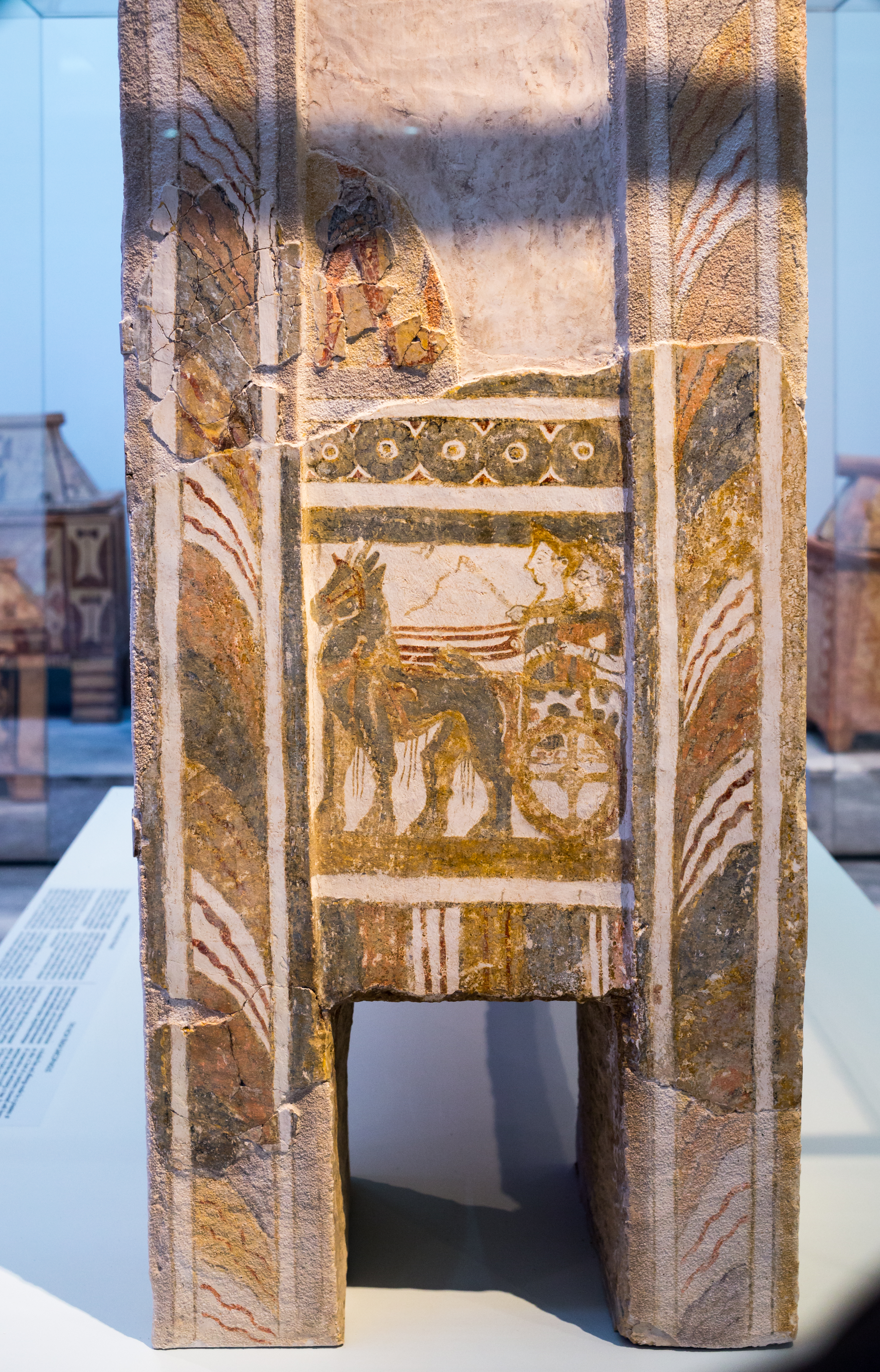
Other side

Recent 20th century excavations on the same site have allowed the sarcophagus's dating to be tightened up to 1370-1320 BC, which coincides with the end of the 18th Dynasty in Egypt, a period of extensive contact between Crete and Egypt, thus allowing the sarcophagus's technical and artistic elements to be related to similar decorative techniques in Egyptian temples and tombs. Some miniature sculpture found in other places of Crete (Kamilari, Archanes) during this period are connected with the worship of the dead and there are traces of a true funereal Egyptian cult at the same period. Funereal cults were not common in Crete, but they were practised in certain instances: at the tombs of dead kings, or possibly of higher officials and kings.

== Iconography ==
Nanno Marinatos, whose view of Minoan religion emphasizes a theocracy ruled by a royal couple of a priest-king and queen, combining political and religious roles (the queen perhaps more central to the latter) suggests the hide skirt reflects close involvement with ritual sacrifices and offerings, and that the same royal figures are shown more than once on the sarcophagus, especially the queen, who is shown both in procession wearing a long robe and plumed crown, and then changed into a hide skirt to conduct ceremonies. In her view, in Minoan art, "the plumed crown" is only worn by deities, griffins, and the queen, who is, by definition, also the chief priestess. The king is only shown wearing the hide skirt. She cites Hittite and Syrian (Ugarit) equivalents for priest-royalty changing clothes to mark a transition in roles.

The sacrifice scene may in part be interpreted by the following criteria from classical and archaic Greece used in worshiping two sets of deities, the ouranioi, deities of the heavens, and the chthonioi, earth deities: position of the hands of the worshipers, level of the altar and color of the deity. The position of the hands of the participants is hands down, palms down indicating the deity invoked is a chthonic deity who is the deity in an epiphany as a black bird on the baetylus behind the low altar, the altar for the chthonioi, who has black color, the color of the chthonioi. The position of the throat of the sacrificial animal, the bull, is down indicating the sacrifice is for the chthonioi or chthonic deity.

The high altar is reserved for the ouranioi, deities of the heavens. Above the low altar, chthonic altar, are two objects, a jug of water and a basket of fruits of the earth (standard Egyptian icon). The jug of water is for purification of the sacrifice participants who wash their hands before sacrificing the bull. In Classical Greece the offering of fruits of the earth was made to a chthonic deity just as on the Hagia Triada Sarcophagus. On the high altar, altar for the ouranioi, are the horns of consecration and a tree with seven branches. Most often, but not always, the horns of consecration are found in high places in Minoan religious art indicating they related to the ouranioi. The tree, with seven branches, may be a tree representing regeneration and the seven branches is an Egyptian number signifying completeness.

There are seven participants in the sacrifice scene with hands down palms down possibly indicating a forceful prayer or invocation of the chthonic deity behind the low altar in epiphany. Also, the sacrifice scene has three other elements common in sacrifices in Classical Greece, the presence of a pipe player, incense in the hand of one of the four rear participants and the jug of water for purification. The time of day of the sacrifice is night because chthonic rituals took place during the night, ouranic rituals took place during the day. The action of both the sacrifice scene and the libation scene moves from left to right. In Egyptian religion, the left was the side of death and right was the side of life.

The libation scene has seven participants giving force to the offering. The two birds in gold color on baetyls sit on double axes and are the highest objects in the scene indicating they are deities in epiphany. The blood in the sacrifice scene is transformed into water because it quenches lips of the "thirsty dead" as mentioned in the Pylos Linear B tablets. The dead man (lowest object) receives the "water" as nourishment because the dead did not feed on solid food, but rather on liquids. Therefore, the calves are symbolic food for dead. The stairs in front of the dead man's tomb, an Egyptian concept, allows the spirit of the dead man to ascend into the realm of the living. The tree on a sarcophagus in ancient Egypt represented regeneration.

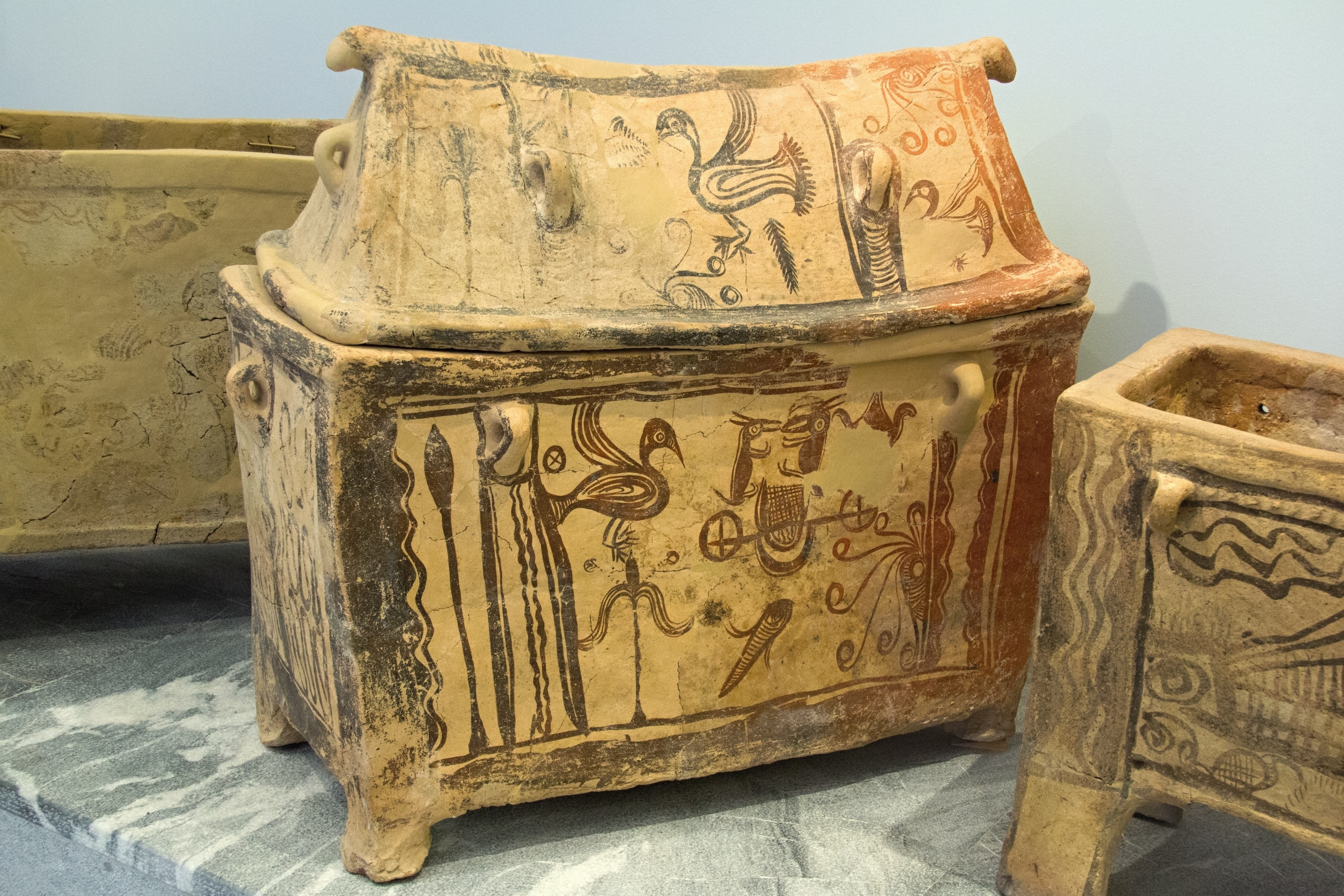
Late Minoan III larnax from Kavrochori, Archaeological Museum of Heraklion

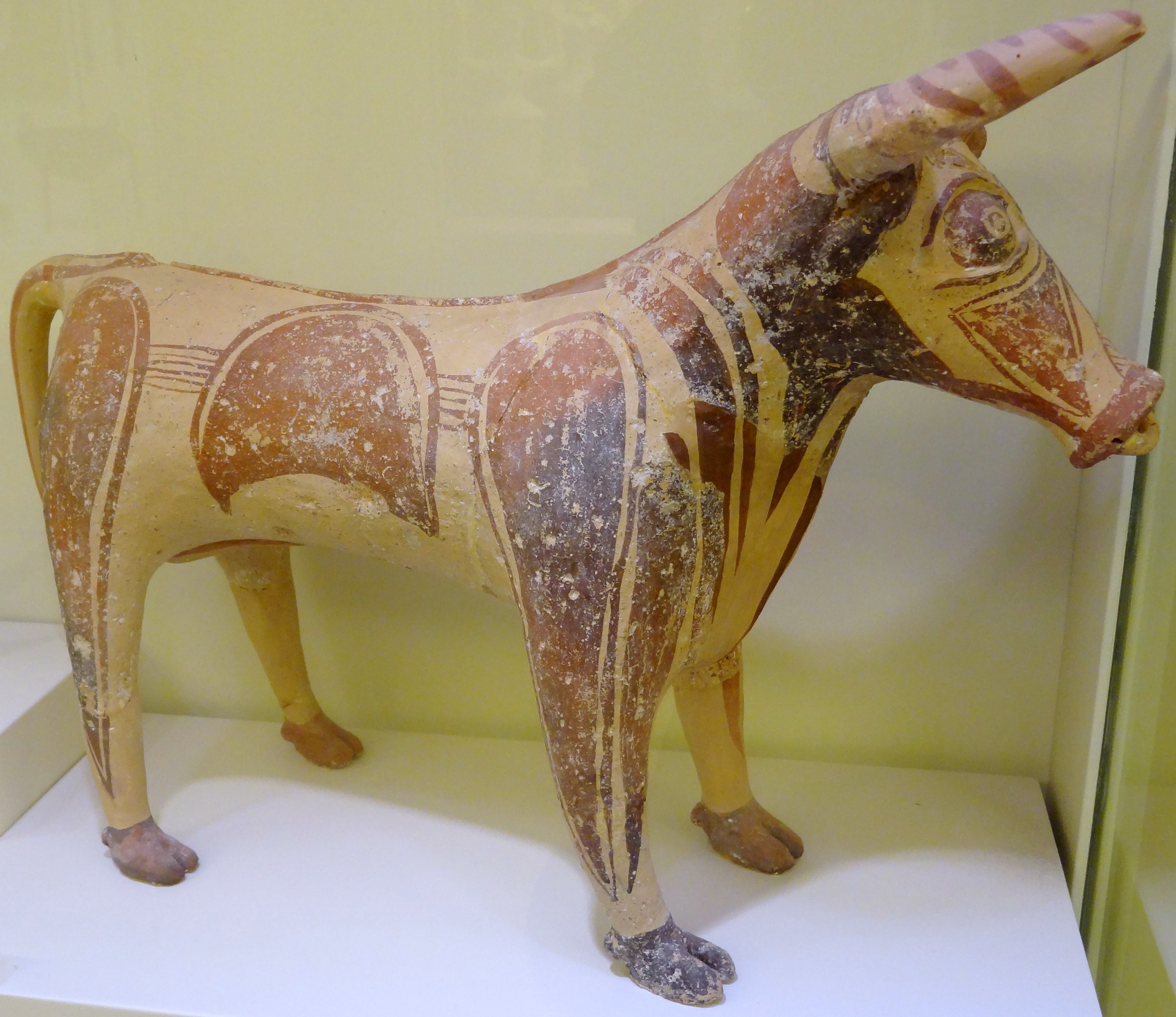
Late Minoan painted model bull in terracotta, AMH, 1200-1100 BC, Height : 35 cm, without the horns
