= Prince of the Lilies =

Minoan mural painting from Knossos, Crete

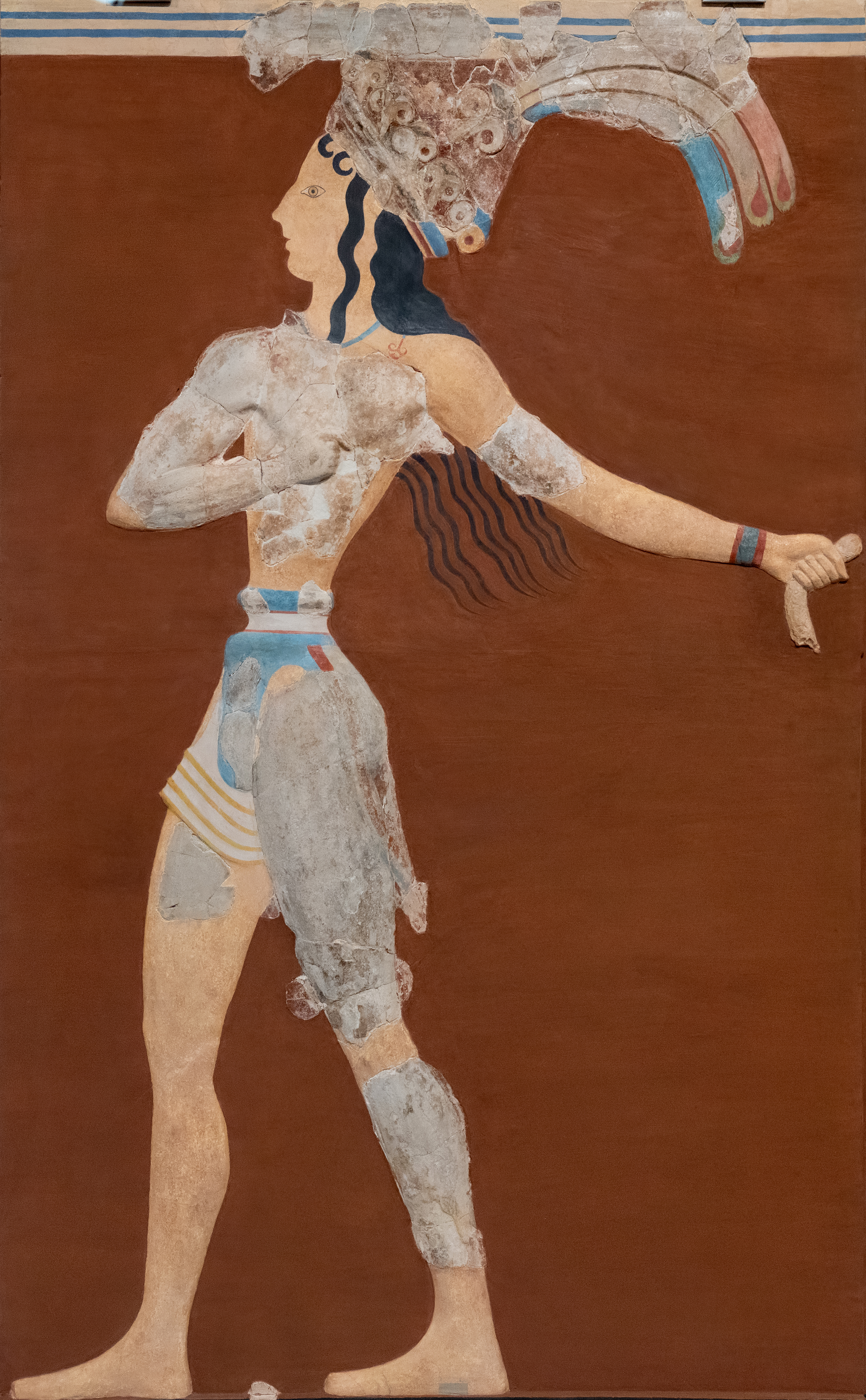
- Reconstruction with the original pieces, Heraklion Archaeological Museum ("AMH")
- Created: c. 1550 BC
- Discovered: 1901; Heraklion, Crete, Greece
- Present location: Heraklion, Crete, Greece

The Prince of the Lilies, or the Lily Prince or Priest-King Fresco, is a celebrated Minoan painting excavated in pieces from the palace of Knossos, capital of the Bronze Age Minoan civilization on the Greek island of Crete. The mostly reconstructed original is now in the Heraklion Archaeological Museum (AMH), with a replica version at the palace which includes flowers in the background.

Though often called a fresco, the figure (not including the flat background) is one of the smaller group of "relief frescos" or "painted stuccos", as the original parts of the image are built up in plaster to a low relief before being painted. It is dated to "Late Minoan IA" by Sinclair Hood, circa 1550 BC, in the Neopalatial ("new palace") period between 1750 and 1500 BC). Maria Shaw says that estimated datings (in 2004) ranged between MM IIIB and LM IB, giving a maximum date range from c. 1650 to c. 1400 BC, "and occasionally later".

Only a few pieces of the original image were excavated; it was probably removed from its wall deliberately during rebuilding or renovating the palace. There have been a number of different suggestions from archaeologists as to the appearance of the original image, many very different from the grand male figure reconstructed a century ago. These go back to the original excavation under Sir Arthur Evans in 1901, as he first thought the fragments belonged to at least two figures, a possibility that remains under discussion. It is now generally agreed that Evans' reconstruction was considerably over-confident. The uncertainty surrounding the fragments may be summarized by the title of a paper published in 2004: "The Priest-King Fresco from Knossos: Man, Woman, Priest, King, or Someone Else?", though in fact the paper tends to back more of Evans' conclusions than some subsequent scholars do.

== The fragments ==
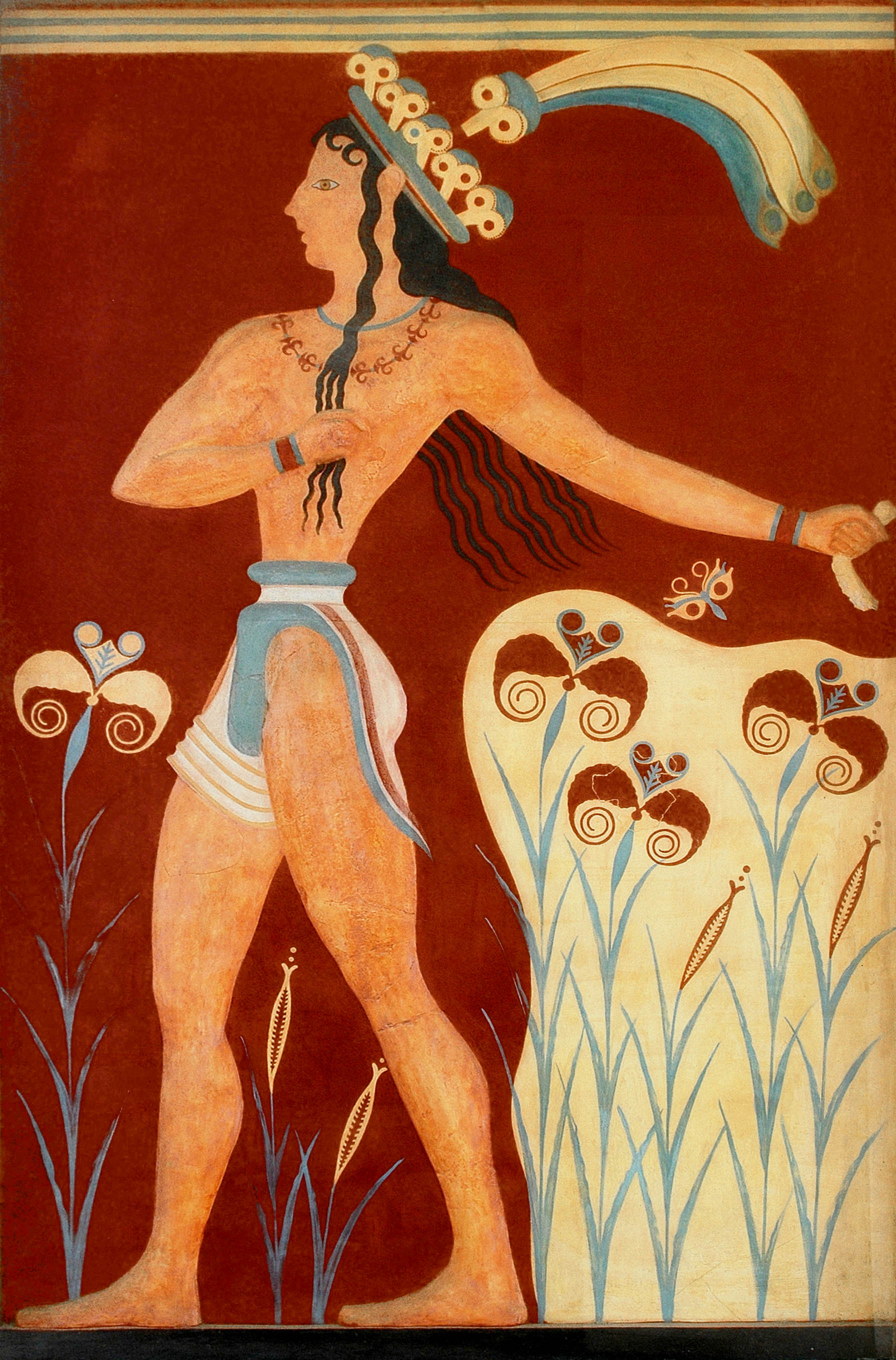
Version with lilies, displayed at Knossos (entirely 20th-century)

The fragments making up the reconstruction at the AMH are, as is usual with these displayed pieces, embedded in plaster of Paris on a backing, and framed. There are a total of nine fragments used:

1. Top of the forehead, part of the ear and hair, and the crown
2. Torso, including the figure's right arm (viewer's left) and clenched fist. Showing a necklace of waz-lilies.
3. Biceps, placed on the other arm
4. Parts of a belt
5. Parts of a codpiece
6. Part of a thigh, and a shin (two pieces)
7. Flat background piece, red and black (restored at bottom)
8. Flat part of flower (not now in the AMH version)
9. Flat part restored as butterfly (not now in the AMH version; between the lilies and arm at right in the Knossos reproduction)

== Reconstruction ==
The reconstruction of the so-called "Priest-king" from Knossos has always been uncertain. When the fragments were excavated under Arthur Evans (not by him personally) in 1901, his first thought was that they belonged to different personages and "the torso may suggest a boxer".

Anatomical observation of this torso shows a contracted powerful musculature and the left disappeared arm was surely in ascendant position because the pectoral muscle is raised. These observations allow us to conclude the torso was one of a boxer resembling the many athletic representations engraved on the Boxer Vase from Hagia Triada. The lily crown belonged to another personage, perhaps a priestess (like on Hagia Triada sarcophagus). The painted reliefs of two athletes boxing in the palace of Knossos were surely the model of the "boxing children" fresco in Akrotiri at Thera.

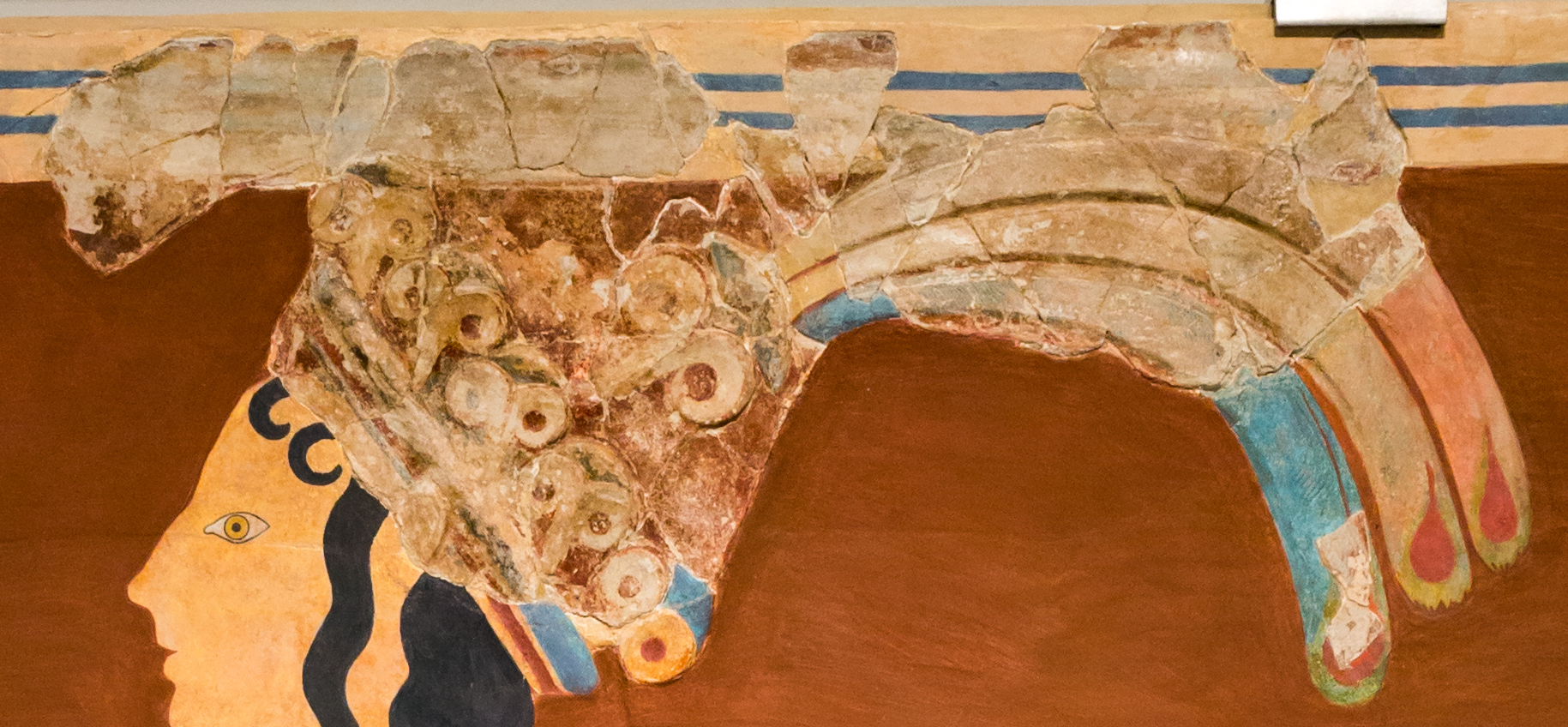
Detail of reconstruction: head and crown, Heraklion Archaeological Museum ("AMH")

Evans later changed his mind, and the reconstruction reflects his later idea of the figure as a "Priest-King"; he used the image on the cover of all volumes of his main publication on the Knossos excavations, despite the cost of gold-embossing the crown. Evans' change of mind was perhaps largely because he had decided that the original painted wall with the fresco was part of a processional corridor in the palace, and the figure one of a group of others shown in procession, via another corridor, towards the Central Court of the palace, always thought to be the place where bull-leaping took place. In the reconstruction, the rope in the invented hand at right was, Evans thought, leading a sphinx or a griffin; a bull being led to a ceremony or sacrifice might be another possibility, but in fact there is no evidence the missing arm held a rope at all.

The fresco griffins from the "Throne Room" wear plumed crowns comparable to the "Priest-King", and if his crown in fact come from another figure, that would be a possibility. In the view of Nanno Marinatos, in Minoan art "the plumed crown" is only worn by deities, griffins and the queen, who is, by definition, also the chief priestess.

The "boxer" idea, for the torso, has resurfaced in recent years, as has an identification as a god. Other suggested reconstructions, that do not combine the piece with the crown with the torso piece, may have the head facing to the viewer's right. The idea of a processional context has been disputed. As to the direction of the head, a careful examination (atop a ladder) by Maria C. Shaw led her to conclude, from the absence of tresses of hair, that at least the restored direction of the head looking to the viewer's left, was correct, which the boxer and god ideas rejected.

The notes by Duncan Mackenzie, the original excavator in 1901, were not done to modern standards, and in particular leave the exact depth where the fragments were found unclear, as well as raising problems reconciling the exact findspot with Evan's published account. Evans and Mackenzie thought that the fragments were found directly (or nearly so) below their original location on a wall, having been swept, or allowed to fall, down to a basement level after being removed from the wall. Sinclair Hood, a later excavator at Knossos, says that "the fragments were found close below the surface in the much eroded southern region of the palace, and were therefore virtually unstratified".

=== Gender ===
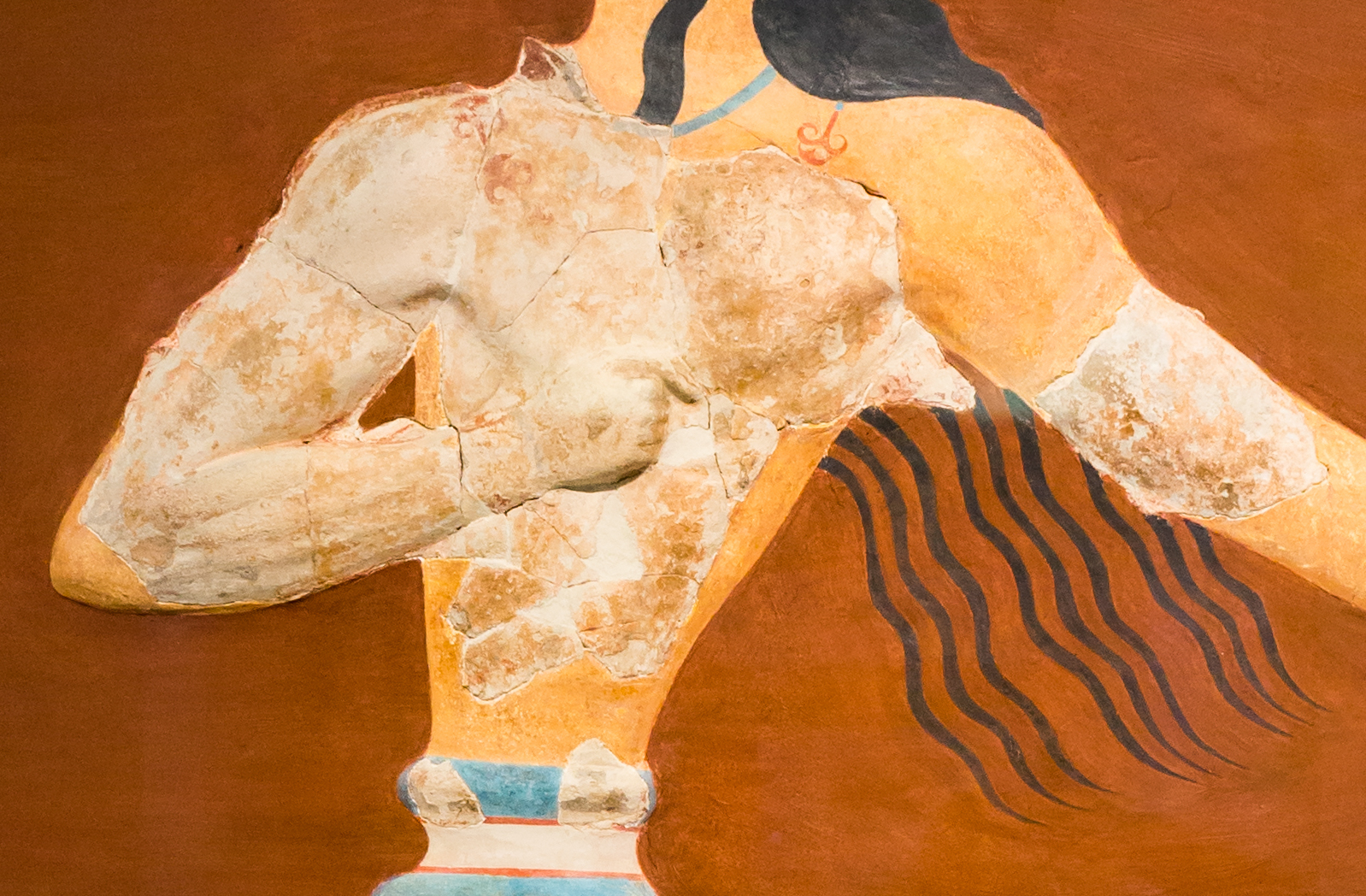
The upper body fragments, AMH

As a general rule, Minoan art followed the Ancient Egyptian convention regarding skin colours of "red" (usually more a reddish-brown) for men's flesh and white for women's flesh (also yellow for gold, blue for silver, and red for bronze). The skin of the Prince of the Lilies has most often been interpreted as "red", but some writers have seen it, at least on some fragments, as a white that became dirty when buried. There are also arguments that the colour gender distinction is not invariable in Minoan painting, for example when, as here, the background is a dark red. The elaborate crown may compare better with others on female figures (whether human or griffin) than male ones.

One proposal was that the figure, including the crown, was a female bull-leaper. Two apparent females are shown in the famous Bull-Leaping Fresco from the Knossos palace; at any rate the two figures at either end of the bull are a white that contrasts strongly with the "red" one vaulting over the bull, although they may only be wearing loinclothes (again, the lack of most parts leaves gender uncertain). However, it has also been suggested that these "white" figures are also male, and the colour difference perhaps indicates youth or seniority.

Although most figures with crowns are females or griffins, Maria Shaw points to a male tumbler in one of the Minoan frescoes from Tell el-Daba, who wears a (considerably simpler) tailed crown. She suggests that athleticism and "royalty" in a Minoan context may have gone together, with the victors in athletic contests given a special status, even an enduring political one.

== Minoan Frescoes ==
Fresco painting was one of the most important forms of Minoan art. Many of the surviving examples are fragmentary. The walls of the great halls of the palaces and houses of Crete were skillfully decorated with frescoes. The paint was applied swiftly while the wall plaster was still wet, so that the colours would be completely absorbed and would not fade. Through the frescoes, one can gain the sense of the character of Minoan life and art and the Minoan joie de vivre. Some frescos were reconstructed between 1450 and 1400 BC, when the Myceneans had established themselves on the island, and exhibit a rather different style.

== Trivia ==
A stylized version of the fresco is the official logo of the Greek ferry company Minoan Lines.

== See also ==
- List of Aegean frescos
- Akrotiri
- Ancient Greek boxing
- La Parisienne (fresco)
