= List of Aegean frescos =

This is a list of Minoan, Mycenaean, and related frescos and quasi-frescos (not completed before the plaster dried) found at Bronze Age archaeological sites on islands and in and around the shores of the Aegean Sea and other relevant places in the Eastern Mediterranean region. In cases where one civilization encroaches on another or a mixture of civilizations is present, both names are used. Though culturally rather different, the Wall Paintings of Thera are regarded as part of Minoan art; all types form part of the wider grouping of Aegean art.

These frescos were primarily murals, few of which survived on their walls. Rather, the majority of frescos were reconstructed from flakes of fallen plaster and stucco, especially in those from Knossos and other sites in Crete. Fortunately those from Akrotiri have survived in more complete form. They are often not the originals, but are either facsimiles of originals, or reconstructions including the original fragments, often as little as 5% of the total area, with the rest added in modern times. Careful examination of the photos usually shows which areas are original. Often considerable artistic license has been exercised in the reconstruction. More than one reconstruction may exist, and more than one name has been assigned. The medium in all cases is plaster for interior walls, and stucco for exterior walls. Often exterior frescos were in relief. Frescos can never be dated more precisely than the period in which they were painted. No names of painters have survived from the Bronze Age. Due to the necessity for extensive restoration, individual styles are typically not discernible, except those of the restorers; however, some scholars have assigned a school or painter name to a name fresco. These are not generally accepted.

== List ==
Thumb	Names	Site	Civilization	Period	Museum	Notes
	Antelopes Fresco	Akrotiri	Cycladic / Minoan	LC I LM IA	Athens	Outline of two antelopes symmetrically arranged. See: Wall Paintings of Thera
	Blue Bird Fresco, Frieze, or Panel	Knossos	Minoan	LM IA	Heraklion	A bird, colored blue, beak closed, uncertain species, shown possibly perched or possibly rising on a downstroke, on or from rocks placed in a flower bed including wild roses, lilies of genus Pancratium, vetch, and other flowers. Part of the same band as the Monkeys Fresco in the House of the Frescos; hence, also called the Monkeys and Blue Birds Fresco.
	Boar-hunt Fresco; Wild boar-hunt fresco	Tiryns	Mycenaean	LH IIIB (13th century)	Athens	Three spotted hounds with collars harry a boar in a field of plants while its head is being pierced from in front by a spear held in a hand.
	Boxers	Tylissos	Minoan	LM IA	Heraklion	Two fragments from one or two miniature frescos duplicating parts of a boxing scene shown on the Boxer Vase from Hagia Triada. A lower body is shown on one, a central body on the other. A kilted male figure in a boxing stance, legs bent, weight on the front leg, rear heel up, displays one arm extended fully with the fist drooping at the end of a snapping motion of the wrist. The Boxer Vase shows a helmeted figure with the off arm pulled back for counterbalance, martial-arts style.
	Bull-Leaping Fresco, Taureador Fresco	Knossos	Minoan	MM IIIB	Heraklion	Composite scene of acrobatics over a galloping bull. The best of a series of similar scenes, the Taureador Frescos.
	Cat and Pheasant	Hagia Triada	Minoan	LM I	Heraklion	A cat on the right side of some ivy-covered rocks stalks a pheasant with its back turned on the left.
	Cat and Pheasant	Knossos	Minoan	LM I	Heraklion	Two fragments, one depicting a spotted Cretan wild cat, with a white patch around the eye, and a second showing the overlapping tail feathers of a pheasant.
	Charging bull and olive tree relief	Knossos	Minoan	MM IIIB	Heraklion	Half of a bull shown charging to right past a rock toward an olive tree.
	Crocus Clumps; Crocus Panel; Crocus Frieze	Knossos	Minoan	LM IA	Heraklion	Band containing a repeated Crocus motif with four red flowers above a waveform double tricolor band: black, blue, white, black, blue, white.
	Cup-bearer Fresco	Knossos	Minoan	LM I	Heraklion	Part of the Procession Fresco, but not one of the figures proceeding from left to right; i.e., not on the same wall. Kilted males bearing pottery in procession from right to left. Evidence exists for only the figure carrying the conical cup extending from head to midriff, often called a rhyton.
	Dancing Lady	Knossos	Minoan	LM IB	Heraklion	Non-acrobatic female upper torso and head, open bodice, tresses flying, arms up, probably dancing.
	Dolphin Fresco	Knossos	Minoan	LM I	Heraklion	A marine scene featuring a school of dolphins composed symmetrically with fish in the interstices and clusters of sponges around the periphery.
	Fisherman Fresco; Fisherboy Fresco	Akrotiri	Cycladic / Minoan	LC I LM IA	Athens	Nude male figure holding two strings of small Mahi Mahi, one in each hand. See: Wall Paintings of Thera
	Fisherman Fresco; Fisherboy Fresco	Akrotiri	Cycladic / Minoan	LC I LM IA	Athens	Nude male figure holding one string of fish with two hands. See: Wall Paintings of Thera
	Flying Fish Fresco or Panel	Phylakopi	Cycladic / Minoan	Phylakopi III, 1600–1400; LC I, LM IA	Athens	Two rows of flying fish. The top is fish in air with fins extended as wings. The bottom is fish leaving or entering water with fins folded. The interstices are filled with bubbles and spray.
	Griffin Fresco	Knossos	Minoan or Mycenaean	LM II	In situ	Griffins couchant in a background of rocks and lilies.
	Ladies in Blue	Knossos	Minoan	MM IIIB	Heraklion	Heads and upper torsos of three women with long tresses, headbands, flounced dresses of open bodice. Blue is the predominant color.
	Mycenaean Lady	Mycenae	Mycenaean	LH IIIB (13th century)	Athens	Head, torso of female with long tresses, headband, dress with full bodice, wearing necklaces, wristlets, holding up a necklace in the right hand.
	Myrtle Shoots; Myrtle Fresco; Myrtle Frieze	Knossos	Minoan	LM IA	Heraklion	Several shoots with myrtle leaves rising from a band representing the ground.
	Parisienne	Knossos	Minoan	LM III	Heraklion	Fragment from the Camp-Stool Fresco of a woman who seemed to the archaeologists to resemble a late 19th-century Parisian woman.
	Partridge Fresco or Frieze	Knossos	Minoan	LM IB	Heraklion	Three distinct mural panels. Panel 1: two strutting partridges on the left face third on the right across uneven ground and a hoopoe perched in a bush. A partridge on the far right beyond a knoll flaps its wings, possibly crowing. Panel 2: three flapping partidges systematically arranged on uneven ground containing striated pebbles. Two more perch to the right. Panel 3: four partridges, the center dominated by a pair in chiasmus.
	Priest-King Relief Fresco, Prince of the Lilies, Feather Prince	Knossos	Minoan	LM I	Heraklion	Procession Fresco figure. Male in a flounced kilt, headdress of uncertain nature, proceeding through a background possibly of lilies, reaching back to grasp possibly a tether.
	Procession Fresco	Knossos	Minoan	LM I	Heraklion	Equivocal name: 536 original life-size figures in procession on the walls of the Corridor of Processions; 22 surviving figures of the procession; the 22 plus the Priest-king Relief Fresco, the Cup-bearer Fresco, and any and all fragments from the additional corridors leading to the south entrance and in the entrance. The 22 are divided into 3 related groups: A of 7 figures, B of 12 figures, and C of 3 figures.
	Procession Fresco Group A	Knossos	Minoan	LM I	Heraklion	Figures 1-7 of the procession Fresco. A pairwise procession of ladies with flounced skirts, bodices unknown, long tresses, facing to the right playing musical instruments: two sistra, one double pipe, and a 7-stringed lyre. The front pair raises its arms in the gesture of adulation.
	Procession Fresco Group B	Knossos	Minoan	LM I	Heraklion	Figures 8-19 of the procession Fresco. Groups of youths approach a central goddess from the right and left. She wears a flounced skirt, open bodice, headdress. Tresses extend to the ground. The head and lower body are in profile. Upper torso frontal. Hands are up, in each two double axes. On the left are 6 kilted males. The 4 nearest the goddess raise arms in adulation. Behind them 2 more bear pots. On the right a pair of kilted males, skirted females, raise arms in adulation. To the far right a kilted male faces the opposite direction.
	Procession Fresco Group C	Knossos	Minoan	LM I	Heraklion	Figures 20-22 of the procession Fresco. Three kilted youths bearing pottery in procession from left to right. Rocks in background. The weave of the kilts is detailed.
	Temple Fresco, Grandstand Fresco, Palace feast	Knossos	Minoan	LM I	Heraklion	A miniature fresco showing the facade of the Tripartite Shrine bordering on the Central Court of the palace at Knossos, surrounded by men in a red wash background and some women in an ivory background. Some ladies shown seated. Supporting pillars at sides possibly of a grandstand. The court is walled.
