= Wall Paintings of Thera =

Historical frescoes on Santorini, Greece

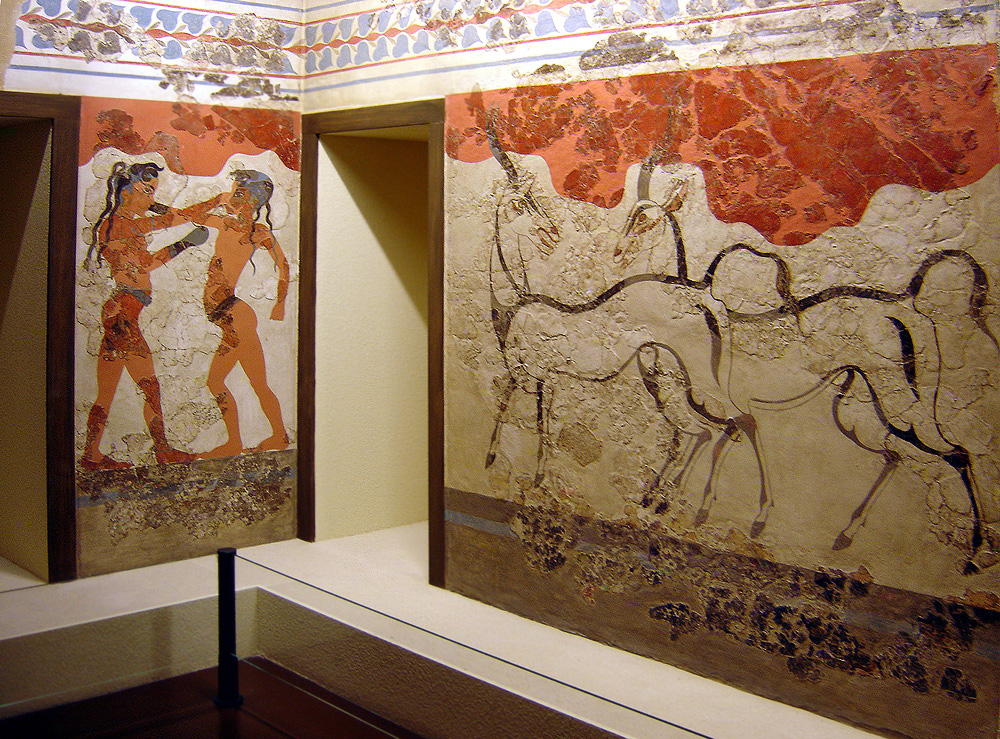
Akrotiri Frescos of Boxing Boys (Possibly Girls) and Gazelles in the National Archaeological Museum of Athens.

The wall paintings of ancient Thera are famous frescoes discovered by Spyridon Marinatos at the excavations of Akrotiri on the Greek island of Santorini (or Thera). They are regarded as part of Minoan art, although the culture of Thera was somewhat different from that of Crete, and the political relationship between the two islands at the time is unclear. They have the advantage of mostly being excavated in a more complete condition, still on their walls, than Minoan paintings from Knossos and other Cretan sites.

Most of the frescos are now in the Prehistoric Museum of Thera on Santorini, or the National Archaeological Museum of Athens, which has several of the most complete and famous scenes.

== Importance ==
Excavated from 1967 to 1974, the wall paintings provide a crucial window into Santorini's history, depicting the early Aegean world as a highly developed society. Of all the findings unearthed at Akrotiri, these frescoes constitute the most significant contribution to present-day knowledge of Aegean art and culture. In their technique, style, and thematic content, the paintings are invaluable objects of study for archaeologists, art historians, zoologists, botanists, and chemists. Originally displayed on the walls of ancient Theran houses, the paintings render ancient figures, customs and historical events.

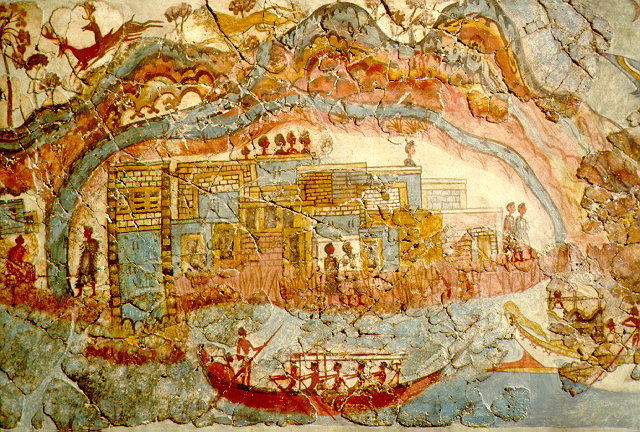
Ship Procession Fresco, Akrotiri, Thera.

== Technique and palette ==
To prepare the stone walls of the buildings for frescoes, the walls were first covered with a mixture of mud and straw, then thinly coated with lime plaster and lastly layers of fine plaster. The palette of the paintings consists of white (from the lime plaster), red (derived from ferrous earths and haematite), yellow (from yellow ochre), blue (either Egyptian blue, purple, or possibly azurite), and mineral black. The ancient Theran artists made full use of their colors: yellow was used for the golden fur of lions or the skin of youths, and as a stand-in for light green for painted plants such as myrtle. Blue was used as a dark gray to indicate birds, animal pelts, fish scales, and the shaven heads of young figures. Deep blue was also used to suggest the deep green of ivy, papyrus, lily, reeds, and palm trees. White indicated the pale skin of female figures while red was used for the darker, sun-tanned skin of males.

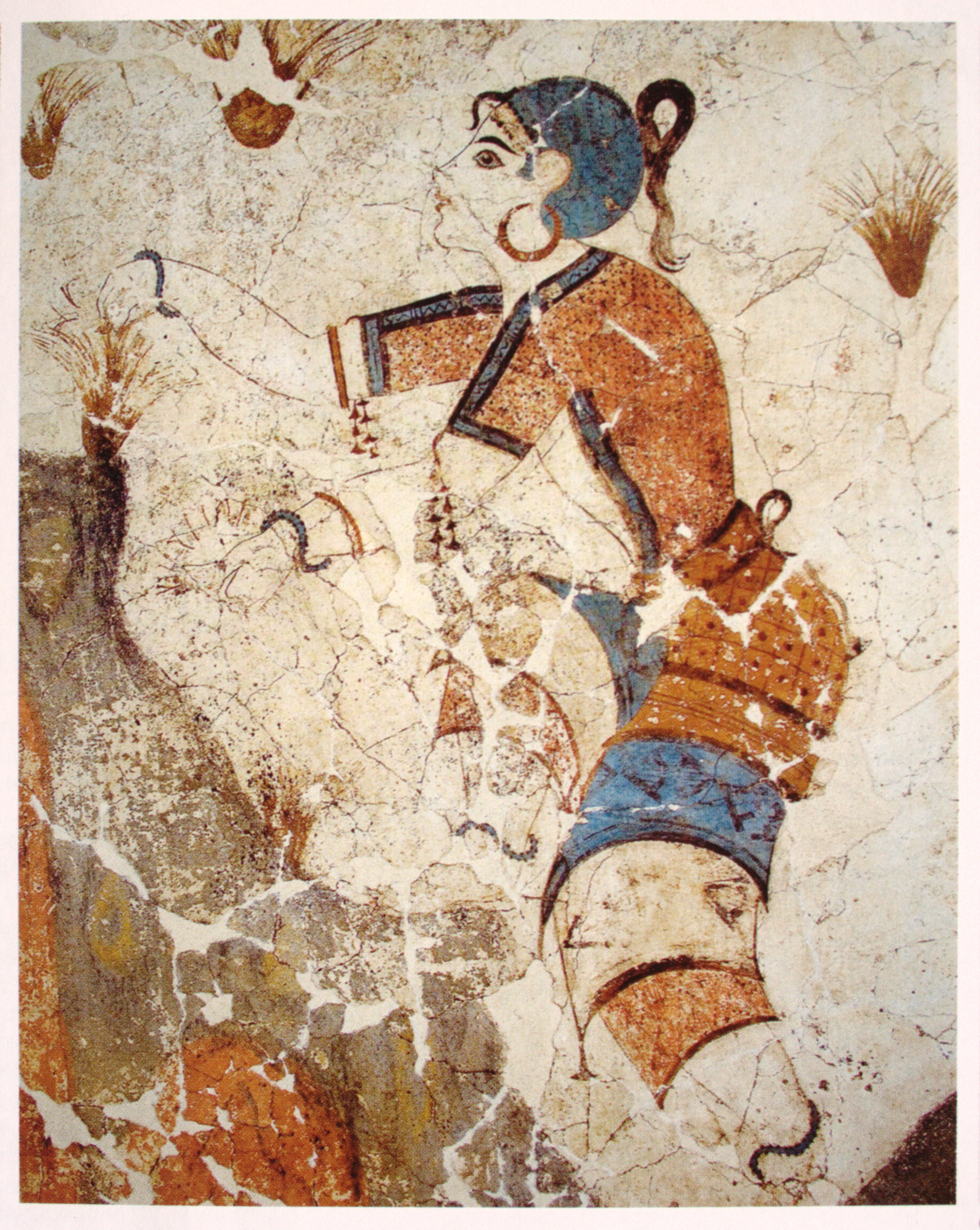
Saffron gatherer in fresco from Akrotiri, Thera.

== Reproductions ==
3-D reproductions of the paintings were sponsored by the Thera Foundation as a commission to Kodak Pathé of France. The Kodak Pathé technique has also been used in the reproductions of the Lascaux cave paintings and the Tomb of Sennefer.

== Exhibitions ==
=== Past ===
- Roemer and Pelizaeus museums, Hildesheim, Germany, 1993: "Egyptian-Minoan Relations"
- Vienna City Museum, Vienna, Austria, 1994: "Pharaohs and Foreigners, Dynasties in the Dark"
- Salon International de Musées et de Exposicion (SIME), Paris, France, 1994
- Petros M. Nomikos Conference Center, Santorini, Greece, 1997: "First International Symposium on the Wall Paintings of Thira"
- Paris, France, 1999–2000: "Europe in the Time of Ulysses, Gods and Heroes of the Bronze Age"

=== Present ===
The reproductions are currently on display at Santozeum, a museum in Santorini that doubles as a private residence. The reproductions are featured on the house's inner walls, presented as they were intended to be viewed in antiquity, as interior embellishments for Aegean homes.
