= Minoan chronology =

Measure of the phases of the Minoan civilization

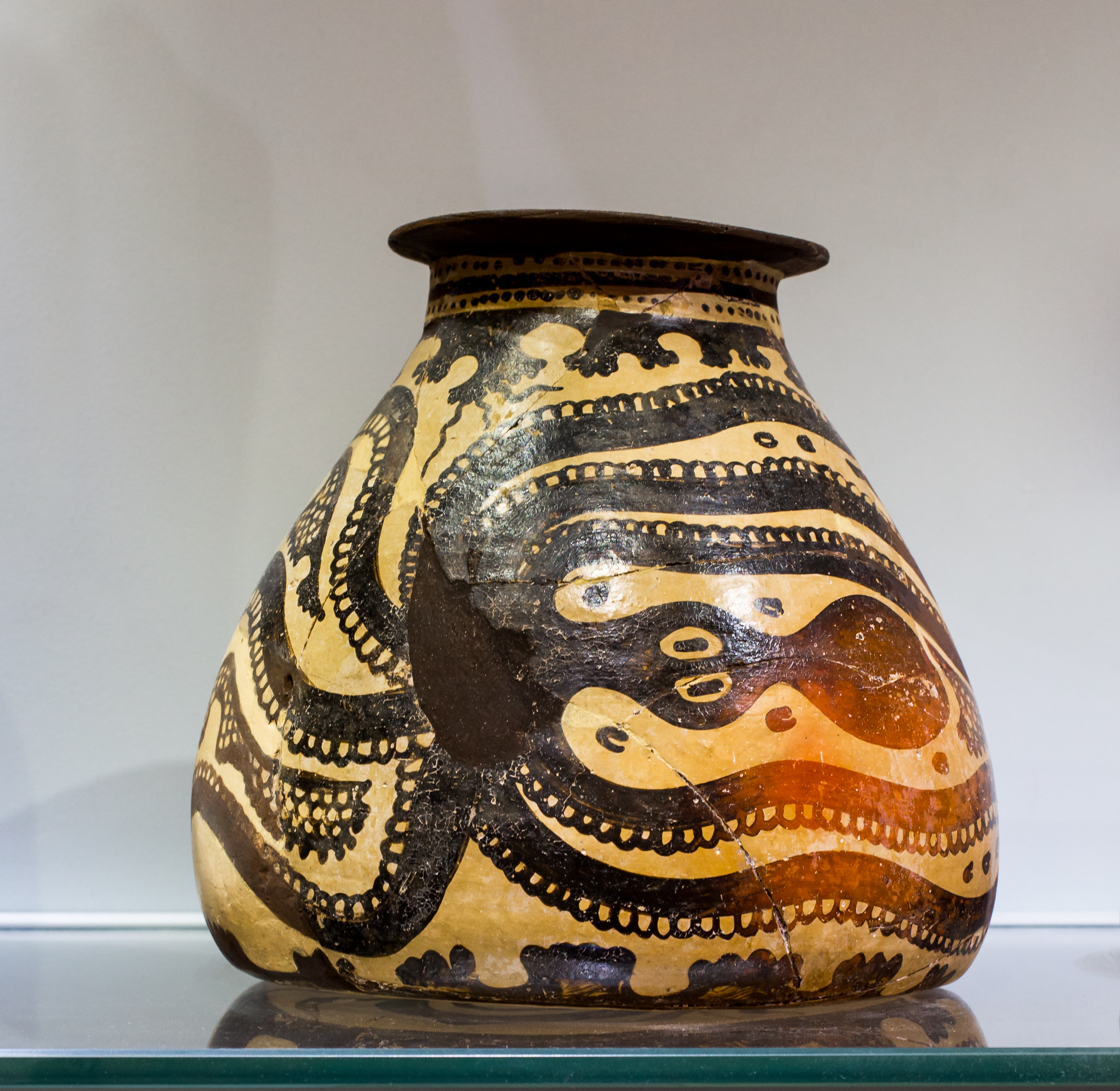
A Marine Style pot, characteristic of the Late Minoan IB ceramic period that followed the eruption of Thera

Minoan chronology is a framework of dates used to divide the history of the Minoan civilization. Two systems of relative chronology are used for the Minoans. One is based on sequences of pottery styles, while the other is based on the architectural phases of the Minoan palaces. These systems are often used alongside one another.

Establishing an absolute chronology has proved difficult, since different methodologies provide different results. For instance, while carbon dating places the eruption of Thera around 1600 BC, synchronism with Egyptian records would place it roughly a century later.

Minoan chronology
3100–2650 BC	EM I	Prepalatial
2650–2200 BC	EM II	Prepalatial
2200–2100 BC	EM III	Prepalatial
2100–1925 BC	MM IA	Prepalatial
1925–1875 BC	MM IB	Protopalatial
1875–1750 BC	MM II	Protopalatial
1750–1700 BC	MM III	Neopalatial
1700–1625 BC	LM IA	Neopalatial
1625–1470 BC	LM IB	Neopalatial
1470–1420 BC	LM II	Postpalatial
1420–1330 BC	LM IIIA	Postpalatial
1330–1200 BC	LM IIIB	Postpalatial
1200–1075 BC	LM IIIC	Postpalatial

== Relative chronology ==
=== Ceramic periodization ===
The standard relative chronology divides Minoan history into three eras: Early Minoan (EM), Middle Minoan (MM) and Late Minoan (LM). These eras are divided into sub-eras using Roman numerals (e.g. EM I, EM II, EM III) and sub-sub-eras using capital letters (e.g. LM IIIA, LM IIIB, LM IIIC).

This system is based on the sequence of pottery styles excavated at Minoan sites. For instance, the transition from EM III to MM IA is characterized by the appearance of handmade polychrome pottery; the transition from MM IA to MM IB follows the appearance of wheel-made pottery.

This framework was originated by Arthur Evans during his excavations at Knossos. It remains the standard in Minoan archaeology, though it has been revised and refined by subsequent researchers, and some aspects remain under debate.

=== Architectural periodization ===
An alternative framework divides Minoan history based on the construction phases of the Minoan palaces. In this system, the Prepalatial period covers the timespan before the construction of the palaces. The Protopalatial era begins with the construction of the first palaces and ends with their destruction. The Neopalatial period, often considered the zenith of Minoan civilization, begins with the rebuilding of the palaces and ends with yet another wave of destructions. The Postpalatial period covers the era in which Minoan culture continued in the absence of the palaces. Some variants of this system include a Final palace period or a Monopalatial period between the Neo- and Postpalatial periods, corresponding to the era when the palace at Knossos was reoccupied.

The architectural periodization was proposed by Nikolaos Platon in 1961, though later scholars have proposed variants and refinements. This system is often used concurrently with the ceramic chronology, since the two are commensurate. For instance, the Prepalatial period covers the ceramic phases EM I through MM IA.

== Absolute dating ==
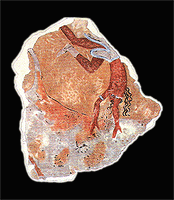
Fragment of a Minoan-style fresco found in an 18th Dynasty context in Egypt

Establishing an absolute chronology has proved difficult. Archaeologists have attempted to determine calendar dates by synchronizing the periods of Minoan relative chronology with those of better understood neighbors. For example, Minoan artifacts from the LM IB ceramic period have been found in 18th Dynasty contexts in Egypt, for which Egyptian chronology provides generally accepted calendar dates. However, dates determined in this manner do not always match the results of carbon dating and other methods based on natural science. Much of the controversy concerns the dating of the eruption of Thera, which is known to have occurred towards the end of the LM IA period. While carbon dating places this event (and thus LM IA) around 1600 BC, synchronism with Egyptian records would place it roughly a century later.

=== Theran eruption ===
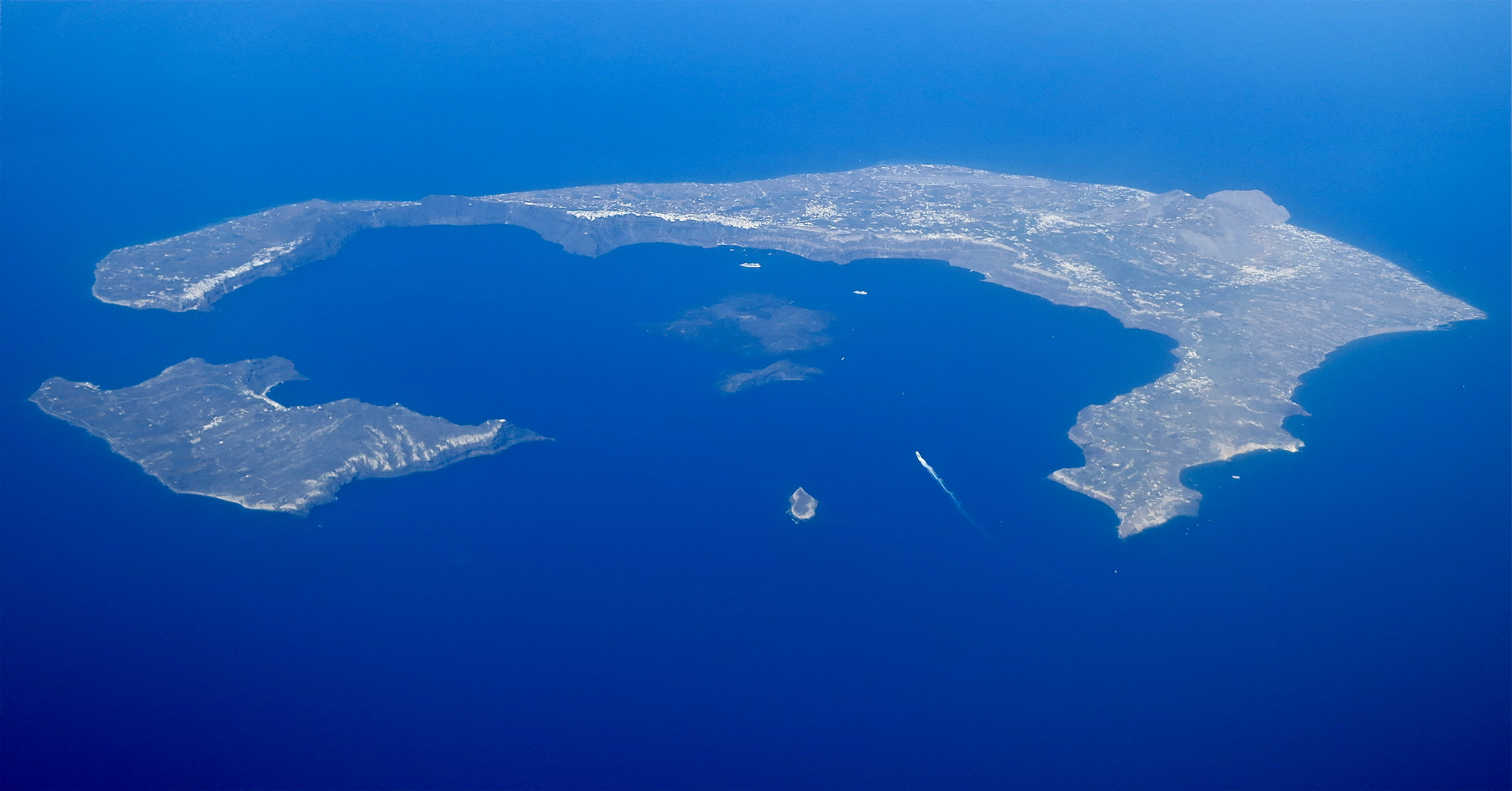
The remains of the Thera volcano's caldera

The timing of natural disasters is of importance to high and low chronologies, which can use the resulting geological evidence to date co-located artifacts. The eruption of the Thera volcano on what is now the island of Santorini is of particular significance to the chronology of Minoan history.

The Theran eruption plays a role in both the high and low chronological approaches, although each system assigns a different date range to the event. In his initial framework, Evans vaguely assigned the eruption to the 17th century BCE. Low chronological assessments revise the eruption to the mid-15th century, while high and blended chronologies push the date back to a point that lies between those assigned by Evans and low chronologies—a more commonly accepted specific date of approximately 1628, though the date is by no means generally agreed. The ancient city was buried under volcanic ash after a massive eruption around 1600 BC. The precise date is of more concern to archaeologists of the Asian mainland and Ancient Egypt—where volcanic ash from Thera is widely evident, and there are established competing chronologies—than to those of Crete.

High chronological techniques such as radiocarbon dating can be used in conjunction with evidence from artifacts indirectly related to the eruption, such as eruption-caused tsunami debris, to pinpoint the exact timing of the event and therefore which Minoan period it belongs in. However, the broadness of radiocarbon dating has also resulted in dates for the eruption of Thera that do not precisely match evidence from the archeological record.

== Minoan history ==
=== Early Minoan ===
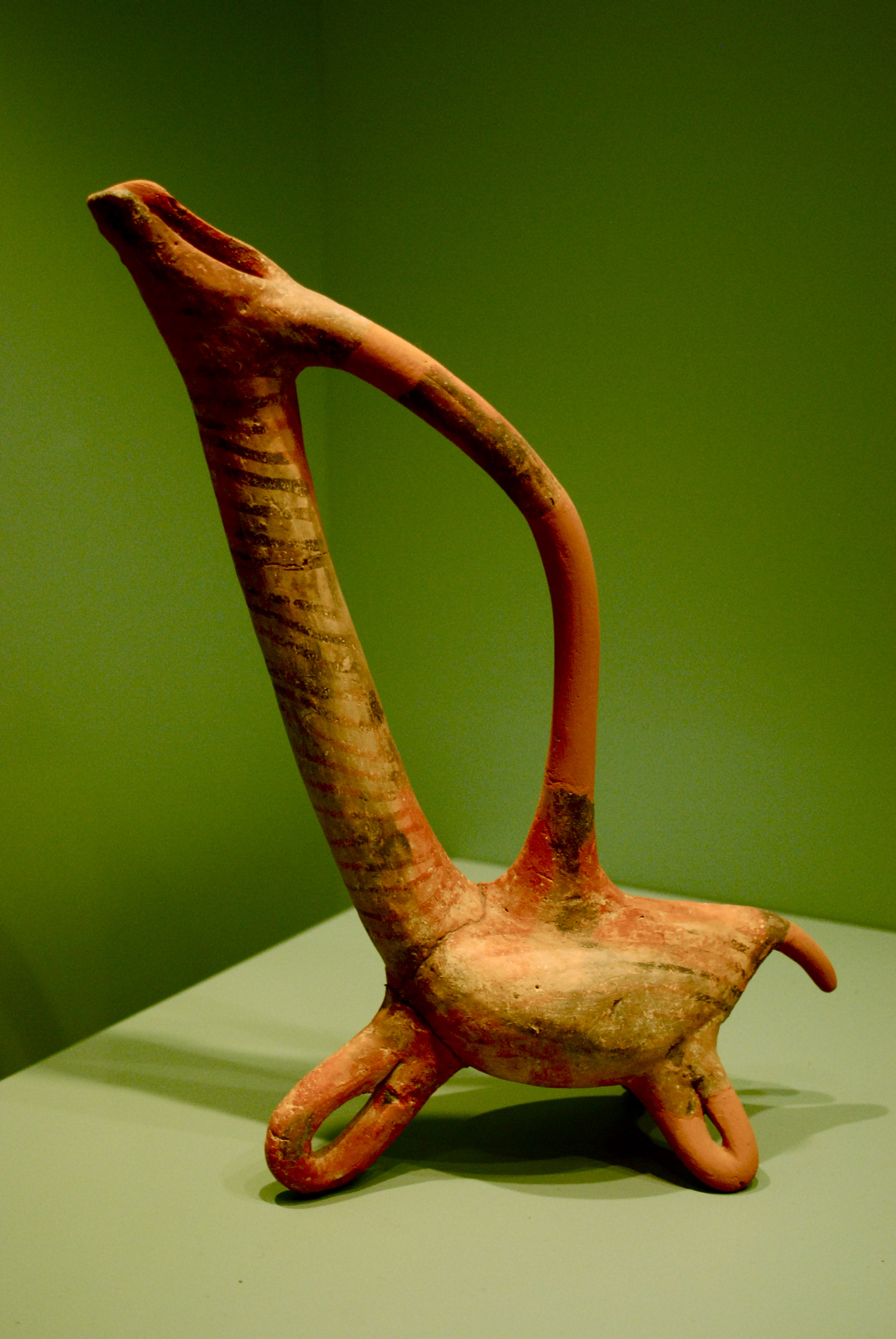
An Early Minoan bird-shaped vessel

Early Minoan society developed largely continuously from local Neolithic predecessors, with some cultural influence and perhaps migration from eastern populations. This period saw a gradual shift from localized clan-based villages towards the more urbanized and stratified society of later periods.

EM I (c. 3100–2650 BC) is marked by the appearance of the first painted ceramics. Continuing a trend that began during the Neolithic, settlements grew in size and complexity, and spread from fertile plains towards highland sites and islands as the Minoans learned to exploit less hospitable terrain.

EM II (c. 2650–2200 BC) has been termed an international era. Trade intensified, and Minoan ships began sailing beyond the Aegean to Egypt and Syria, possibly enabled by the invention of masted ships. Minoan material culture shows increased international influence, for instance in the adoption of Minoan seals based on the older Near Eastern seal. Minoan settlements grew, some doubling in size, and monumental buildings were constructed at sites that would later become palaces.

EM III (c. 2200–2100 BC) saw the continuation of these trends.

=== Middle Minoan ===
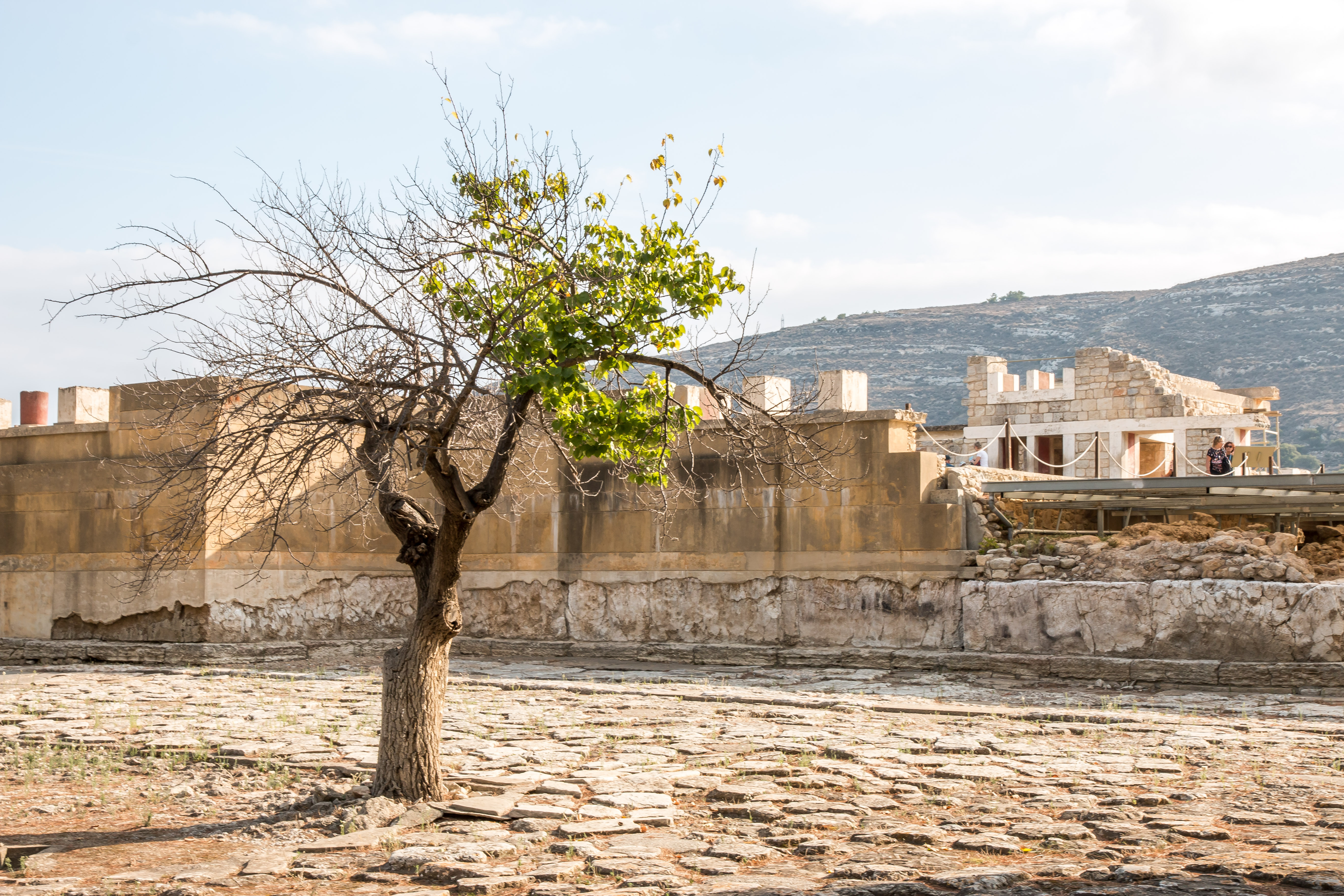
The western facade of the Palace at Knossos. Like other palaces, it was built during the Middle Minoan era but continually renovated throughout its existence.

MM I (c. 2100–1875 BC) saw the emergence of Protopalatial society. During MM IA (c. 2100–1925 BC), populations increased dramatically at sites such as Knossos, Phaistos, and Malia, accompanied by major construction projects. During MM IB (c. 1925–1875 BC), the first palaces were built at these sites, in areas that had been used for communal ceremonies since the Neolithic. Middle Minoan artisans developed new colorful paints and adopted the potter's wheel during MM IB, producing wares such as Kamares ware.

MM II (c. 1875–1750 BC) saw the development of the Minoan writing systems Cretan hieroglyphic and Linear A. It ended with mass destructions generally attributed to earthquakes, though violent destruction has been considered as an alternative explanation.

MM III (c. 1750–1700 BC) marks the beginning of the Neopalatial period. Most of the palaces were rebuilt using architectural innovations, with the notable exception of Phaistos. Cretan hieroglyphs were abandoned in favor of Linear A, and Minoan cultural influence becomes significant in mainland Greece.

=== Late Minoan ===
The Late Minoan period was an eventful time that saw profound change in Minoan society. Many of the most recognizable Minoan artifacts date from this time, for instance the Snake goddess figurines, La Parisienne Fresco, and the marine style of pottery decoration.

LM I (c. 1700–1470 BC) was a continuation of the prosperous Neopalatial culture. A notable event from this era was the eruption of the Thera volcano, which occurred around 1600 BC towards the end of the LM IA subperiod. One of the largest volcanic explosions in recorded history, it ejected about 60 to 100 cubic kilometres (14 to 24 cu mi) of material and was measured at 7 on the Volcanic Explosivity Index. While the eruption destroyed Cycladic settlements such as Akrotiri and led to the abandonment of some sites in northeast Crete, other Minoan sites such as Knossos continued to prosper. The post-eruption LM IB period (c. 1625–1470 BC) saw ambitious new building projects, booming international trade, and artistic developments such as the marine style.

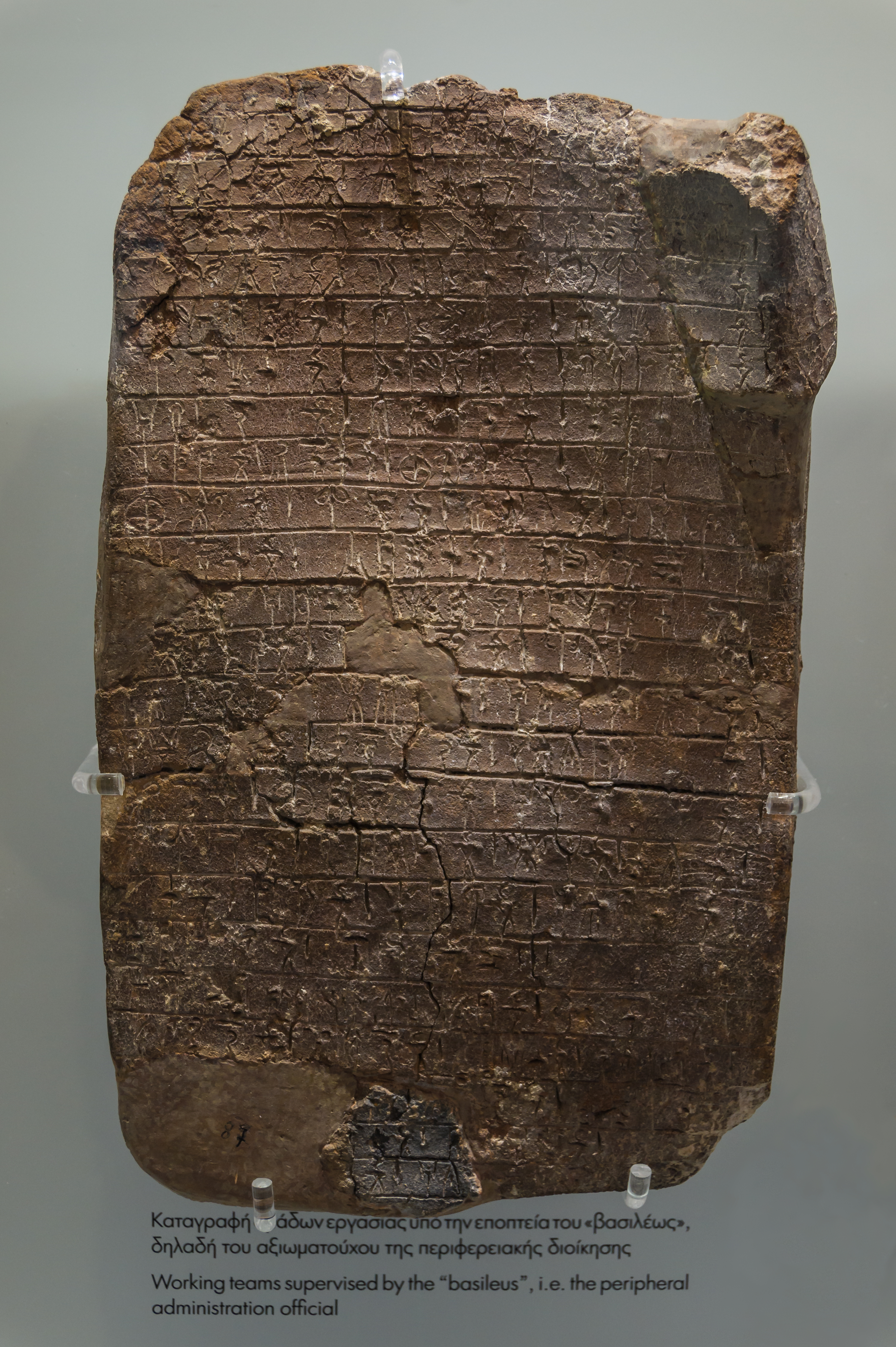
Tablet with Linear B writing, a development of the late palatial period

LM IB (c. 1625–1470 BC) ended with severe destructions throughout the island, marking the end of Neopalatial society. These destructions are thought to have been deliberate, since they spared certain sites in a manner inconsistent with natural disasters. For instance, the town at Knossos burned while the palace itself did not. The causes of these destructions have been a perennial topic of debate. While some researchers attributed them to Mycenaean conquerors, others have argued that they were the result of internal upheavals. Similarly, while some researchers have attempted to link them to lingering environmental disruption from the Thera eruption, others have argued that the two events are too distant in time for any causal relation.

LM II (c. 1470–1420 BC) is sparsely represented in the archaeological record but appears to have been a period of decline. It marks the beginning of the Monopalatial period, as the palace at Knossos was the only one remaining in use.

LM III (c. 1420–1075 BC) shows profound social and political changes. Among the palaces, only Knossos remained in use, though it too was destroyed by LM IIIB2 and possibly earlier. The language of administration shifted to Mycenaean Greek, written in Linear B, and material culture shows increased mainland influence, reflecting the rise of a Greek-speaking elite.

In LM IIIC (c. 1200–1075 BC), coinciding with the wider Late Bronze Age collapse, coastal settlements were abandoned in favor of defensible locations on higher ground. These small villages, some of which grew out of earlier mountain shrines, continued aspects of recognizably Minoan culture until the Early Iron Age.
