= Akrotiri (prehistoric city) =

Bronze age archeological site on Santorini

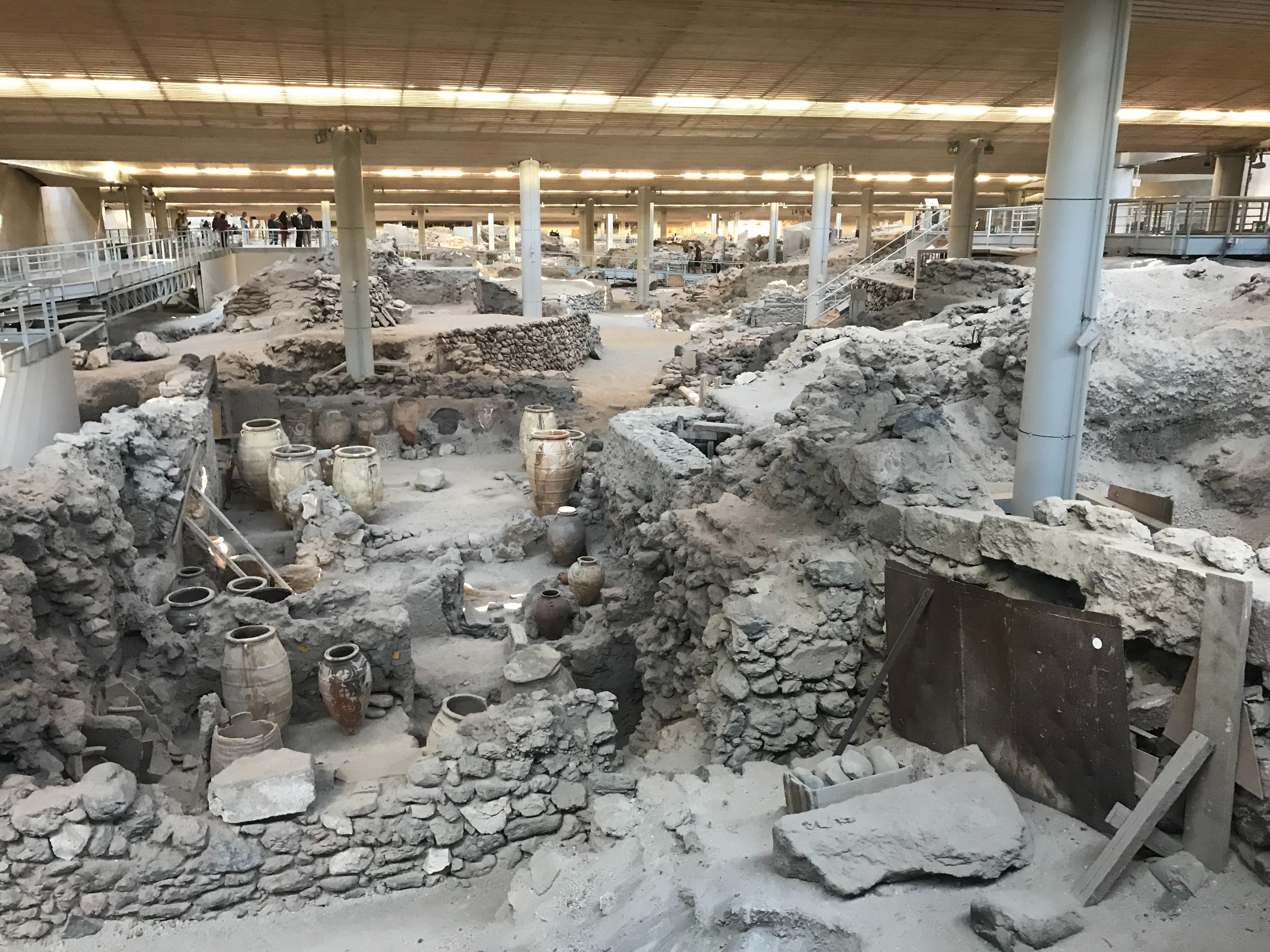
- Excavation of Akrotiri in 2018

- Location within Greece
- 36°21′05″N 25°24′13″E
- Type: Settlement
- Cultures: Cycladic
- Location: Santorini, Greece
- Region: Aegean sea

History
- Built: c. 5000–4001 BC
- Abandoned: 16th century BC
- Event: Theran eruption

Site notes
- Excavation dates: since 1967
- Condition: Ruins

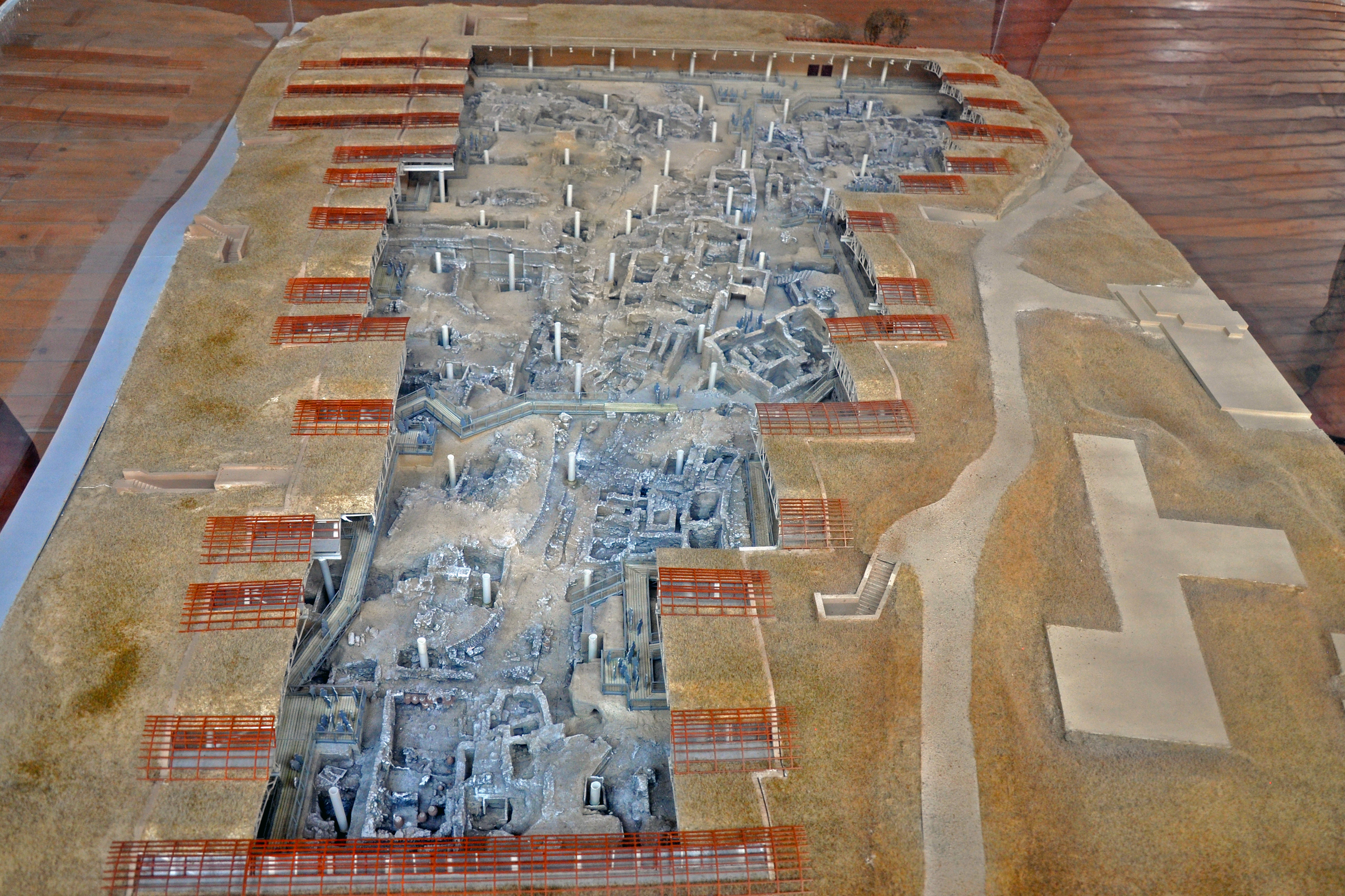
Model of the excavations

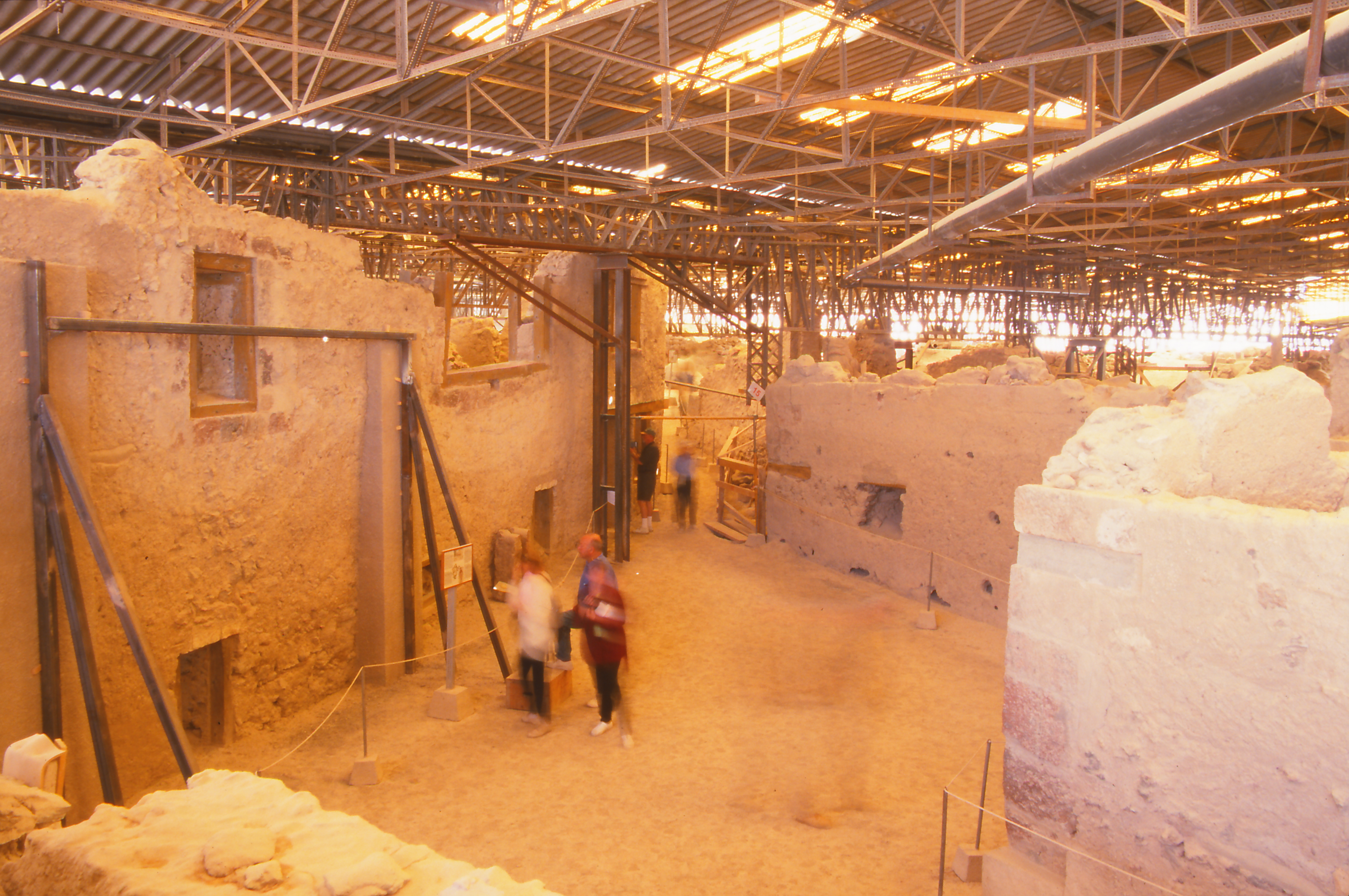
A view down onto Triangle Square in front of the West House in Akrotiri, Greece. Taken on 16 May 2001, 4 years before the 23 September 2005 roof collapse.

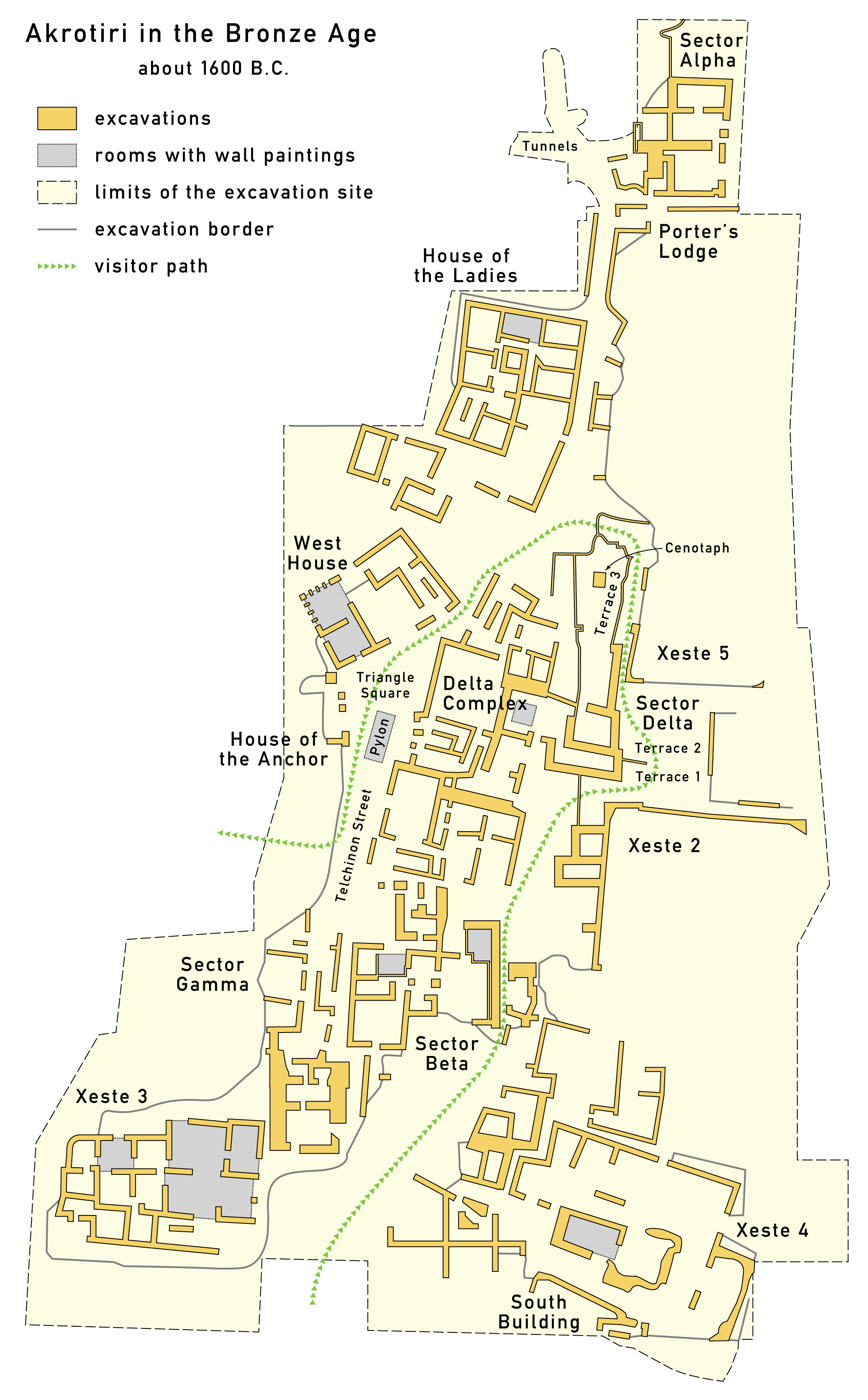
Layout map of Akrotiri in the Bronze Age

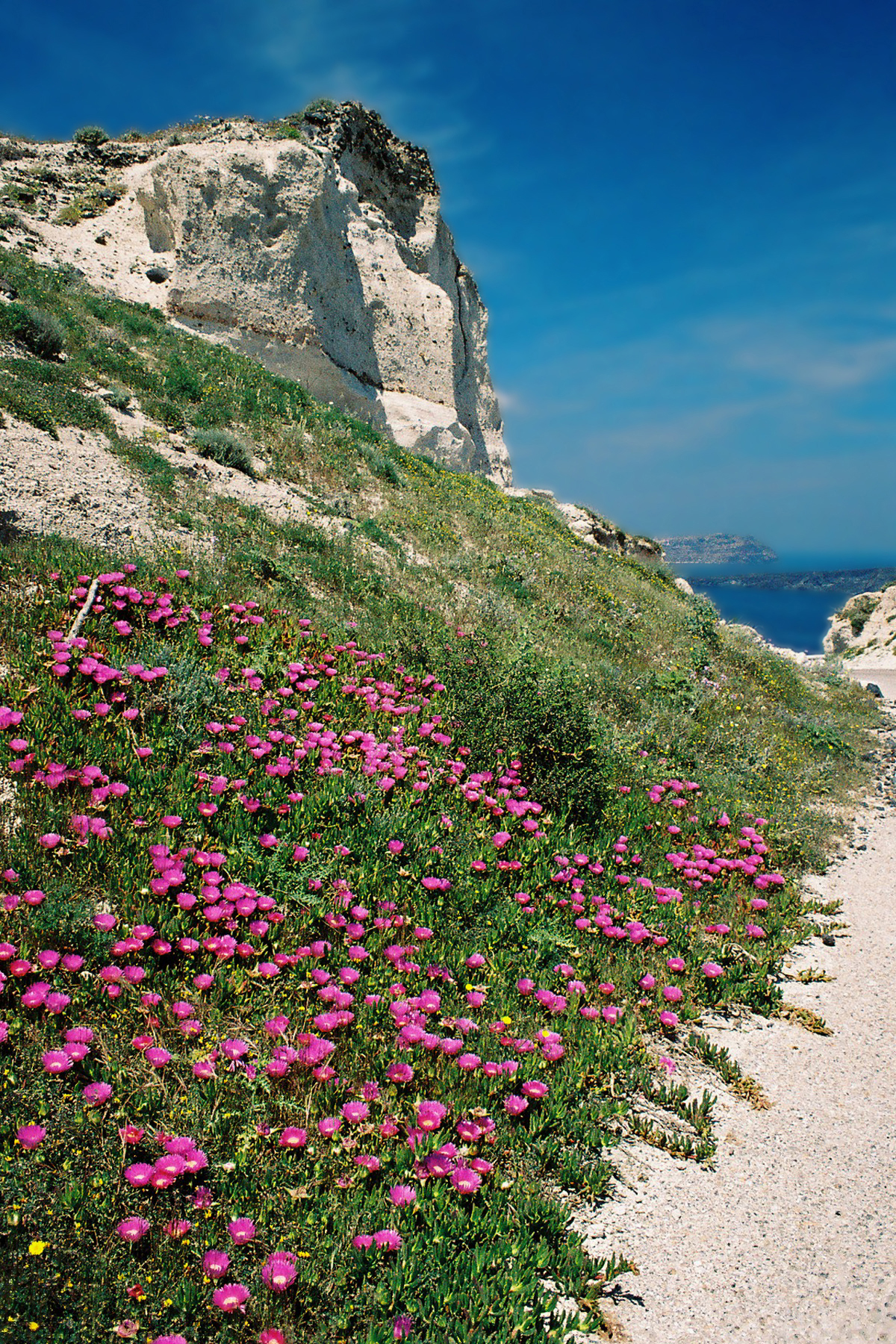
Pumice on the shelving northern coast

Akrotiri (Greek: Ακρωτήρι, pronounced Greek: [akroˈtiri]) is a Cycladic Bronze Age settlement site on the volcanic Greek island of Santorini. The name comes from the nearby village of Akrotiri, the name of the site in antiquity is unknown.

The settlement was destroyed during the Theran eruption sometime in the 16th century BC, and was buried in volcanic ash, which helped preserve its fine frescoes. Akrotiri has been excavated since 1967, after earlier excavations on the island.

== History ==
The earliest evidence for human habitation of Akrotiri can be traced back as early as the fifth millennium BCE when it was a small fishing and farming village. By the end of the third millennium, this community developed and expanded significantly. One factor for Akrotiri's growth may be the trade relations it established with other cultures in the Aegean, as evidenced in fragments of foreign pottery at the site. Akrotiri's strategic position on the primary sailing route between Cyprus and Minoan Crete also made it an important point for the copper trade, thus allowing it to become an important centre for processing copper, as proven by the discovery of moulds and crucibles there. Akrotiri's prosperity continued for about another 500 years; paved streets, an extensive drainage system, the production of high-quality pottery and further craft specialization all point to the level of sophistication achieved by the settlement.

This all came to an end, however, in the 16th century BC with the volcanic eruption of Thera. There is a variety of dating evidence for the eruption, but its exact year is not known. Radiocarbon dating places it most probably between 1620 and 1530 BC, which is also in accord with the date range of 1570 to 1500 BC suggested by similarities of the material culture with other sites in the Aegean. Unusual growth patterns observed in tree rings in 1597, 1560, 1546 and 1544 BC are consistent with a major volcanic event in any of those years. The latter three dates might be the best candidates as they are also considered possible for Egyptian New Kingdom records that are thought to refer to the eruption.

== Excavations ==
Akrotiri was buried by the massive Theran eruption in the middle of the second millennium BC (during the Late Minoan IA period); as a result, like the Roman ruins of Pompeii after it, it is remarkably well-preserved. Frescoes, pottery, furniture, advanced drainage systems and three-story buildings have been discovered at the site.

Despite being a Cycladic settlement, the site is associated with the Minoan civilization due to inscriptions in Linear A, and close similarities in artifact and fresco styles.

The earliest excavations on the island of Santorini were conducted by French geologist F. Fouque in 1867 after some local people found old artifacts at a quarry. Later, in 1895–1900, the digs by German archeologist Baron Friedrich Hiller von Gaertringen revealed the ruins of ancient Thera on Mesa Vouno, which date from the archaic period, much after the Minoan eruption. Also, a little later, R. Zahn excavated in the locality of Potamos, near Akrotiri, under the auspices of the German Archaeological Institute at Athens.

The extensive modern excavation was started in 1967 by Spyridon Marinatos and revealed the full value of this site. Marinatos's choice of the site proved to be correct and a few hours into the excavation, the remains of the buried city began to be discovered. The next step was to determine the extent of the city, which took two seasons devoted to the site in 1967 and 1968. In the early years of the excavation, a great deal of attention was paid towards the organization of proper facilities for the dig, including substantial workshops, laboratories built for storage, repair, and treatment, and areas for examination of archaeological finds. Because of the site being preserved in thick, volcanic debris, Marinatos noted that many of the buildings were preserved to a height of more than a single storey, creating unique challenges for excavation. He experimented with tunnelling into the pumice, but this technique was later abandoned. In 1975, after Marinatos' death, Christos Doumas took over as the head of excavations.

Excavated artifacts have been installed in a museum distant from the site (Museum of Prehistoric Thera), with many objects and artworks presented. Only a single gold object has been found, hidden beneath flooring, and no uninterred human skeletal remains have been found. This indicates that an orderly evacuation was performed with little or no loss of life.

In 2005, a new roof structure, meant to protect the site, collapsed just before its completion, killing one visitor. No damage was caused to the antiquities. Between 2005 and April 2012, the site was closed to visitors. Between 2005 and 2016, excavations stopped, due to lack of funding, then resumed with sponsor support.

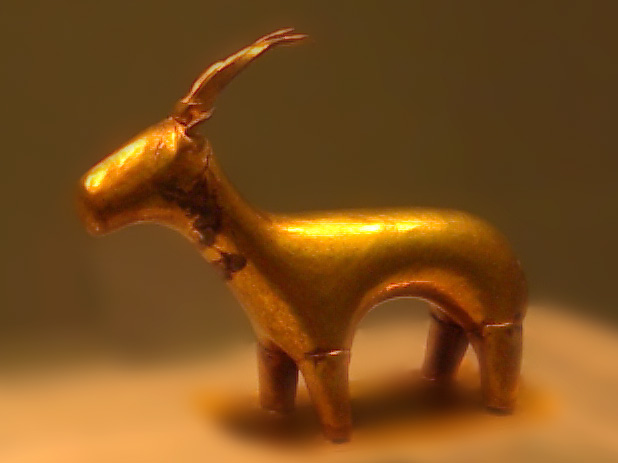
A golden goat figurine, found in 1999

In October 2018, a small shrine with a marble figurine of a woman was discovered in the "House of the Thrania" which is located near Xeste 3, where a golden goat was found in 1999.

== Frescoes ==
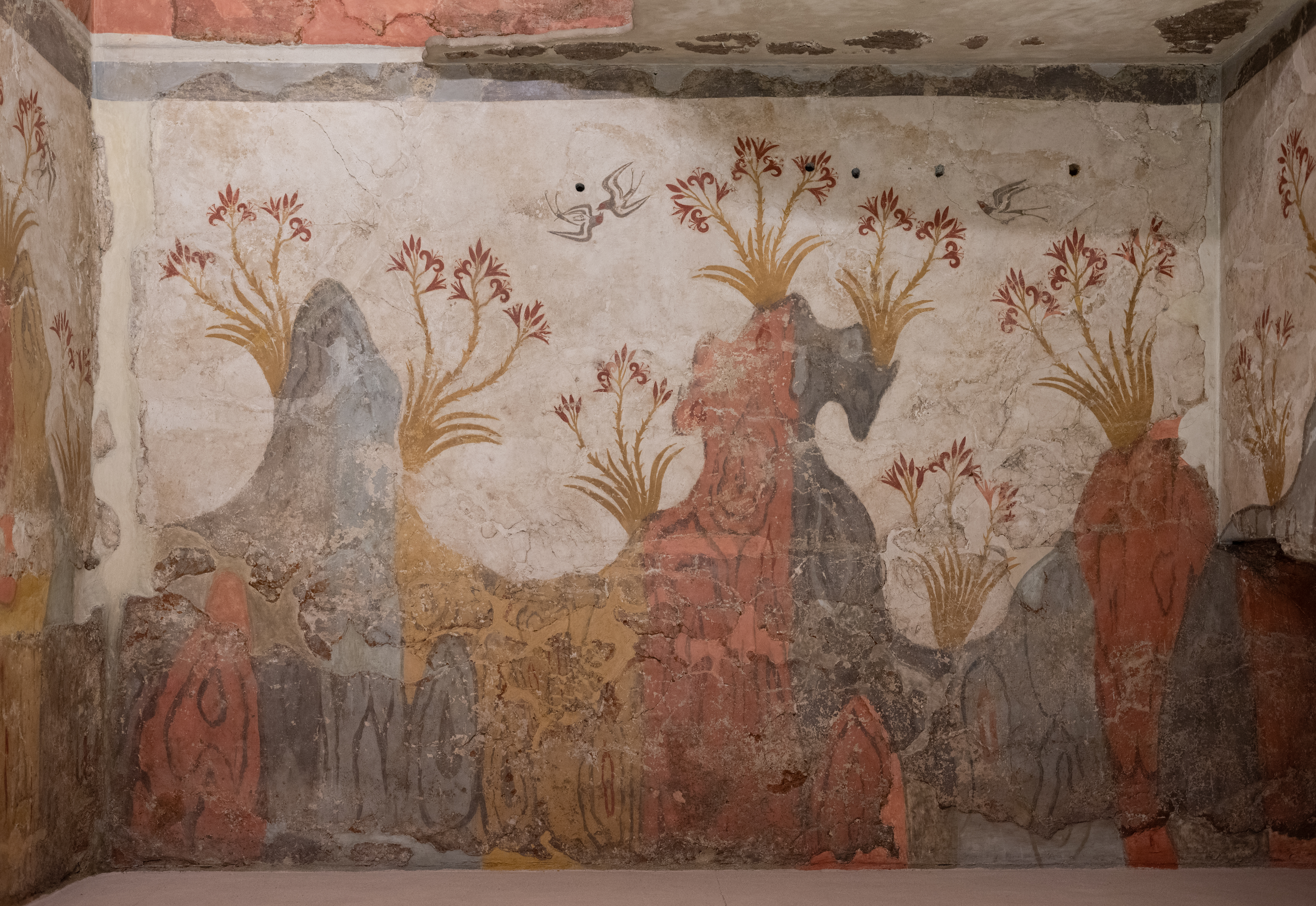
Spring flowers and swallows

The frescoes in Akrotiri are especially important for the study of Minoan art because they are much better preserved than those that were already known from Knossos and other sites on Crete, which have nearly all survived only in small fragments, usually fallen to the ground.

All of the pigments used by the artists at Akrotiri for painting the frescoes look as though they are mineral based and thus have resulted in the great preservation of the pieces. The colors used in Theran painting include white, yellow, red, brown, blue and black. The technique used is not true fresco, except for a few isolated instances, and instead appears as though the painting was begun while the plaster was still wet, but as though the artist made no effort to keep it wet, and seemed content to complete the work on a dry surface. As a result, often on the same fresco, the paint has penetrated the plaster in some areas but flakes off easily in others.

Specialized techniques were required when it was discovered early on in the excavation process that the site contained numerous well preserved fresco wall paintings. Tassos Margaritoff, one of the leading restorers of Byzantine frescoes, is currently the supervisor of the Akrotiri project. The first fragments of fresco were discovered in 1968 in Sector Alpha and depict the head of an African, the head of a blue monkey and some large flying blue birds.

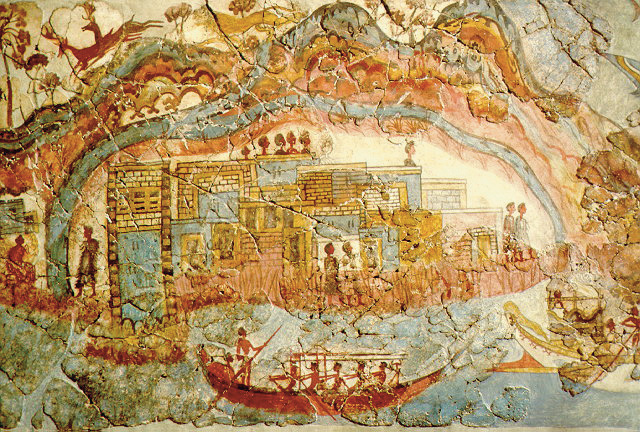
Akrotiri Minoan town-2

In 1969, the fresco of the Blue Monkeys in Room Beta 6 was discovered and created increased excitement at the site. The rocky landscape which the monkeys are depicted climbing upon mimics the similar volcanic rocks near the site presently.

In 1970 the Spring Fresco was uncovered in Room Delta 2. It is the first fresco to have been found perfectly preserved and still standing in its original installed position. The supporting wall of the fresco was not in the best condition and thus the fresco had to be removed immediately in order to preserve it. Rescuing the fresco was a delicate procedure and allowed the archaeologists and restorers to develop invaluable experience.

A few other frescoes including The Fisherman and the Lady from the House of Ladies have been found standing, though detached from the wall.

== Artifacts ==
The excavations at Akrotiri have produced a large variety of artifacts revealing numerous varieties of Late Cycladic (LC I) pottery from the area. Pottery is the most common and most enduring commodity in the culture of the majority of ancient societies and, thus, is of great importance to archaeologists in interpreting Ancient Greek societies. At Akrotiri, pottery is particularly abundant because of the circumstances surrounding the demise of the town, in that its sudden evacuation meant that inhabitants were only able to take their most valuable possessions with them.

Serving a multitude of purposes, pottery can tell a great deal about the society in which it were produced. Large jars were used as containers for storage of goods, while others like stirrup jars were designed for the transportation of certain commodities. As well, there were also vessels for preparing and cooking food, for eating and drinking and many other diverse activities, including bathtubs, braziers, oil lamps, bee-hives, flower pots, etc. Most evidently, the shape, size and perhaps even the decoration of the vases were closely related to their use in the ancient world.

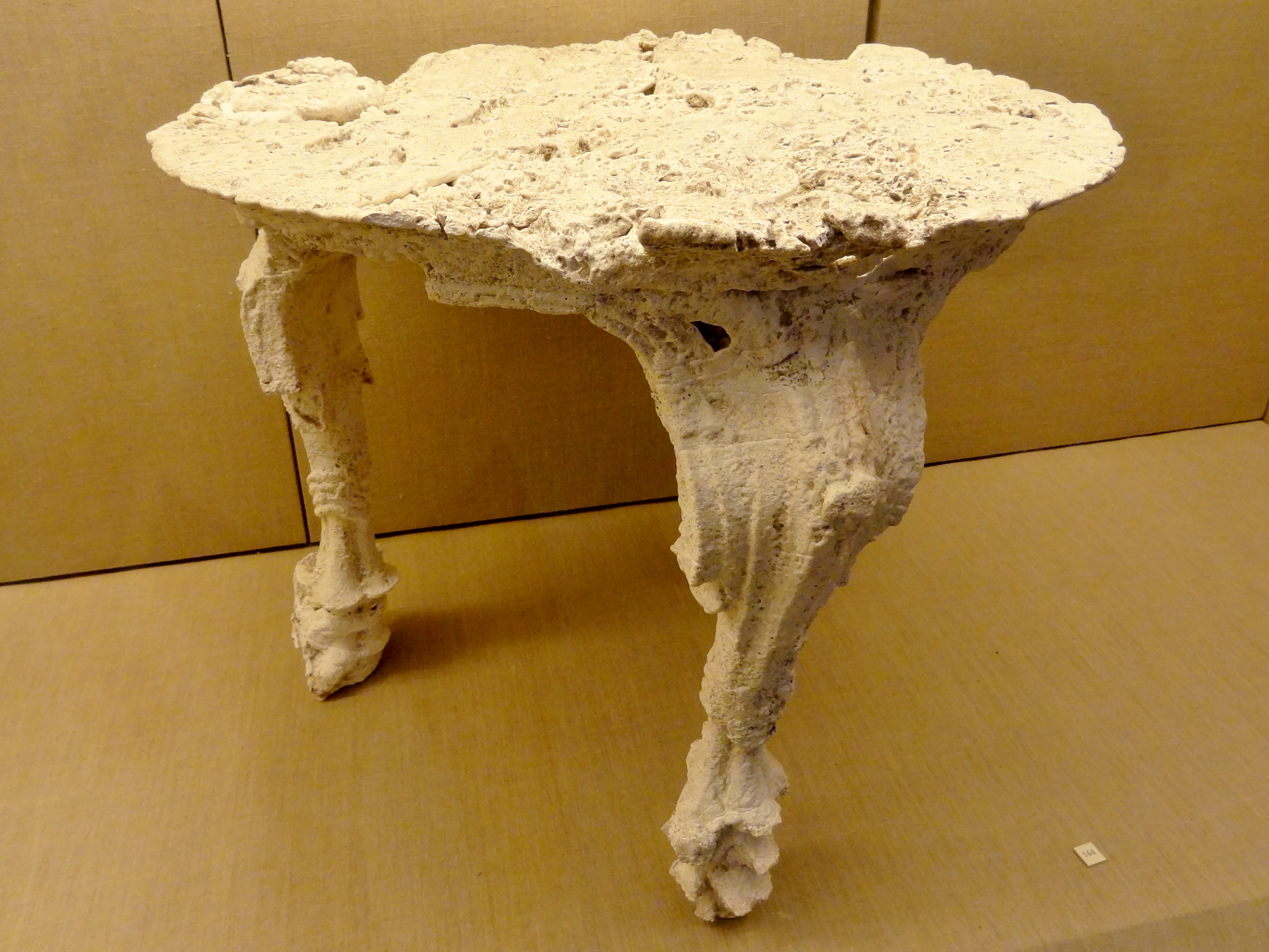
Offering table, plaster cast of a wooden 16th-century-BC original

In regards to furniture, the volcanic ash which engulfed the city often penetrated into the houses in large quantities and, in these layers of fine volcanic dust, produced negatives of the disintegrated wooden objects. Using these negatives as molds, liquid plaster-of-Paris can be poured in and produce casts of parts, or even entire pieces of furniture such as beds, tables, chairs or stools. Offering tables are one of the most common finds in Akrotiri and were either made of clay or coated with plaster, decorated in the same technique as the wall paintings, and only consisted of three highly decorated legs and a top.

In the 'House of the Benches' a large deposit of between 300 and 500 horns were found. The horns were from cattle, sheep and goats and almost all of them were altered by fire, with keratinous sheath removed and painted with patterns in ochre. The religious use is currently unknown.

== Connecting path ==
There is a path descending from the first houses of the modern settlement to the parking lot of the excavations of Akrotiri, connecting the old excavation site to the town of Akrotiri. The path was signposted and reopened in September 2012 and now regularly undergoes maintenance, thanks to international volunteers. The local population has been the first supporter of this initiative and in charge of the upkeep of the path, working alongside the volunteers. The path is suitable for mountain biking, hiking and many other activities.

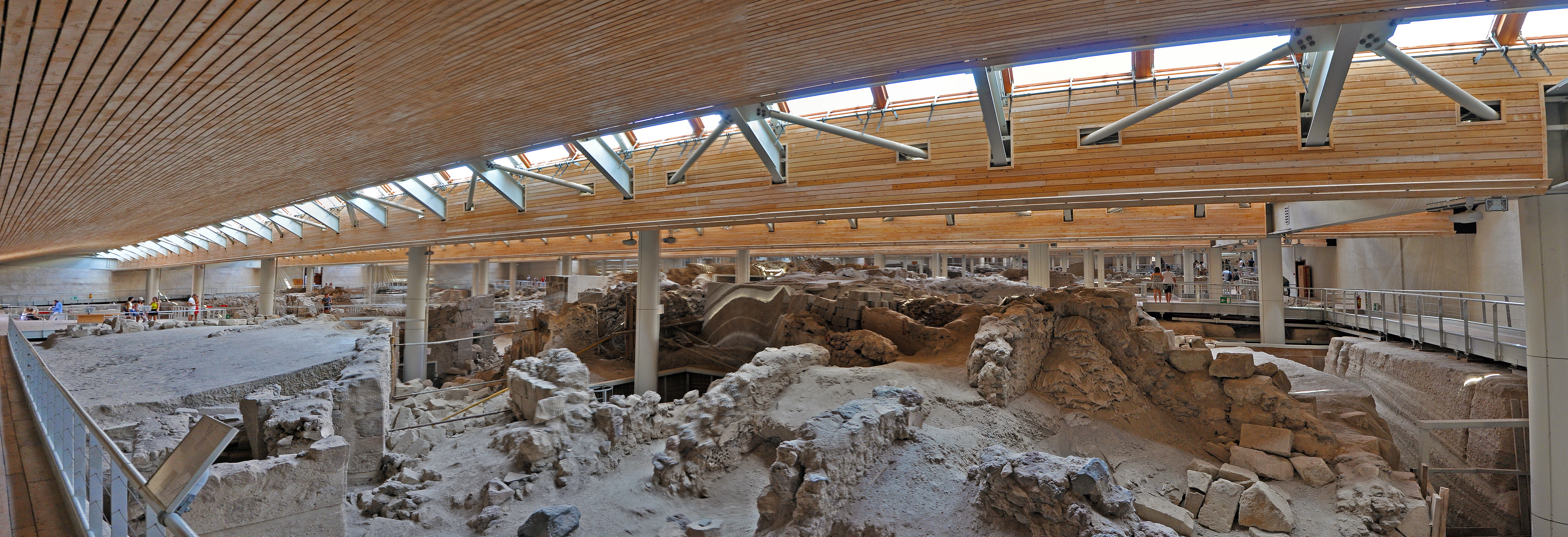
Panorama of Akrotiri excavation.

== See also ==
- Akrotiri Boxer Fresco, one of the frescoes at Akrotiri
- Akrotiri, Santorini, modern village located north of the ancient settlement
- Castle of Akrotiri, a ruined castle on Santorini
- List of Aegean frescos
- Summer Lovers, a 1982 Randal Kleiser film with filmed scenes at Akrotiri
- Towns destroyed by volcanic deposits
