= Akrotiri Boxer Fresco =

Historical fresco on Santorini, Greece

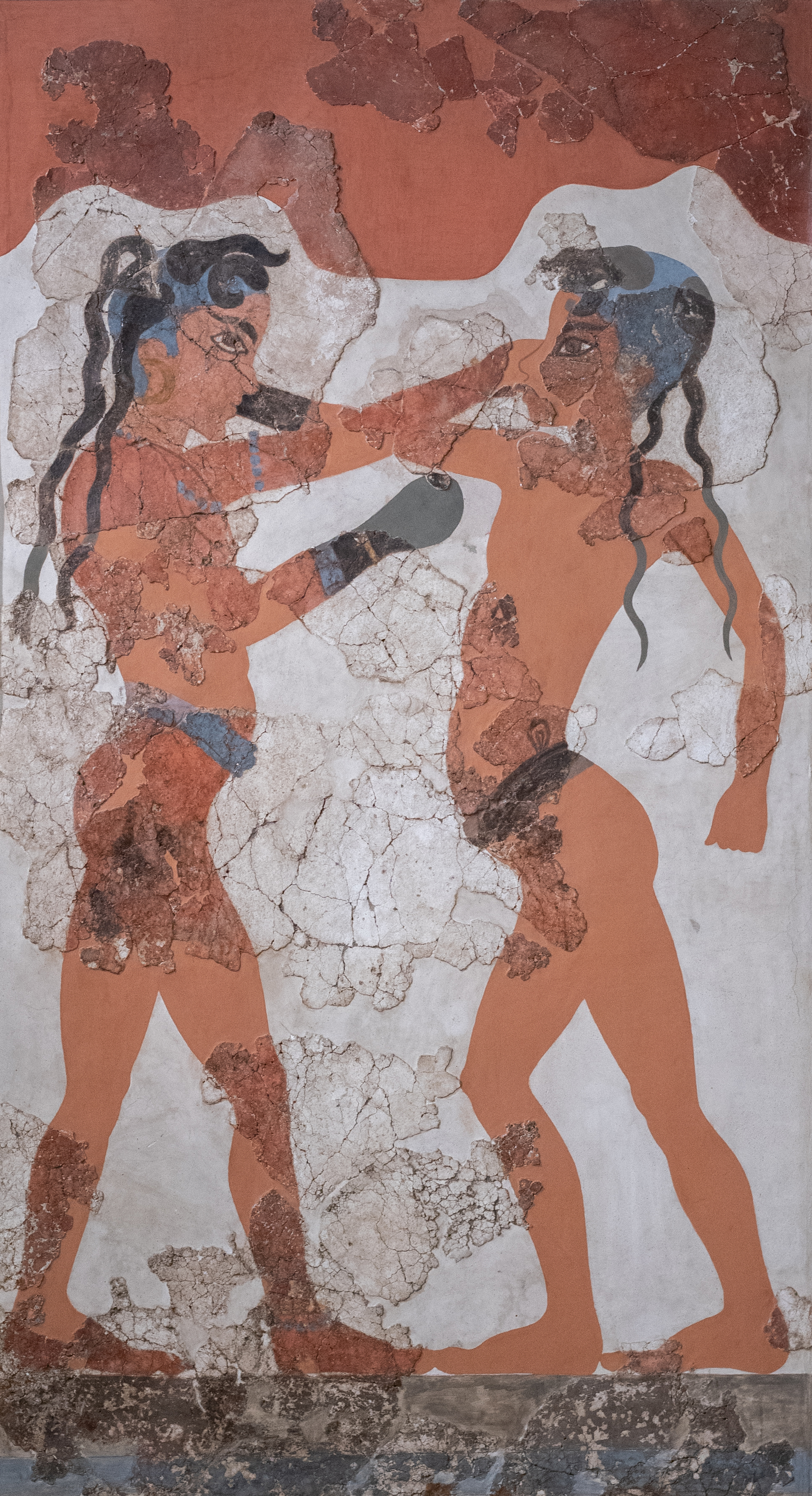
Akrotiri Boxer Fresco

The Akrotiri Boxer Fresco, discovered in 1967, is one of the Wall Paintings of Thera and a leading example of Minoan painting, though the version usually shown (as here) includes large sections "reconstructed" by archaeologists, which can be identified by their smooth texture. It is a fresco depicting two young boys wearing boxing gloves and belts and dates back to the Bronze Age, 1700 BC. Around 1600 BC, a disastrous earthquake, followed by a volcanic eruption, covered Akrotiri, Greece in a thick layer of pumice and ash, which resulted in the remarkable conservation of frescoes, including the Akrotiri Boxer Fresco, from multiple buildings throughout the town. This particular fresco was found in room B1 of Building Beta along with the Antelope Fresco. The boys' shaved heads and stray locks indicate their youth, while their darker skin tone indicates their gender. The boy on the right is completely nude except for a belt, whereas the boy on the left has jewellery; most likely markers of a higher status. They appear to be slightly over life-size at roughly 5 ft 10 in (1.78 m). To create such vibrant frescoes, a smooth lime plaster was applied to the walls and then painted over. It is impossible to know whether the match was a competitive one or simply a routine sport.

== Volcanic eruption ==
The volcanic eruption on the island of Thera, now known as Santorini, was one of the largest Plinian eruptions in the past 10,000 years, with a range of 30–40 cubic kilometres. An eruption of this size would have most likely generated a tsunami over 100 feet tall, travelling across the Aegean Sea and decimating populations in its path. The size of this eruption had far-reaching impacts on the environment and civilisation in the region, primarily the Minoans. The thick layer of pumice and ash from the volcano covered the island and preserved much of the alienation for thousands of years. As a result, several pieces of Minoan artwork, primarily the frescoes, were preserved as fragments in the rubble, and have been reassembled by archaeologists. These frescoes provide modern society with invaluable insight into the daily lives of the Cycladic people.

== Role of boxing in Minoan culture ==
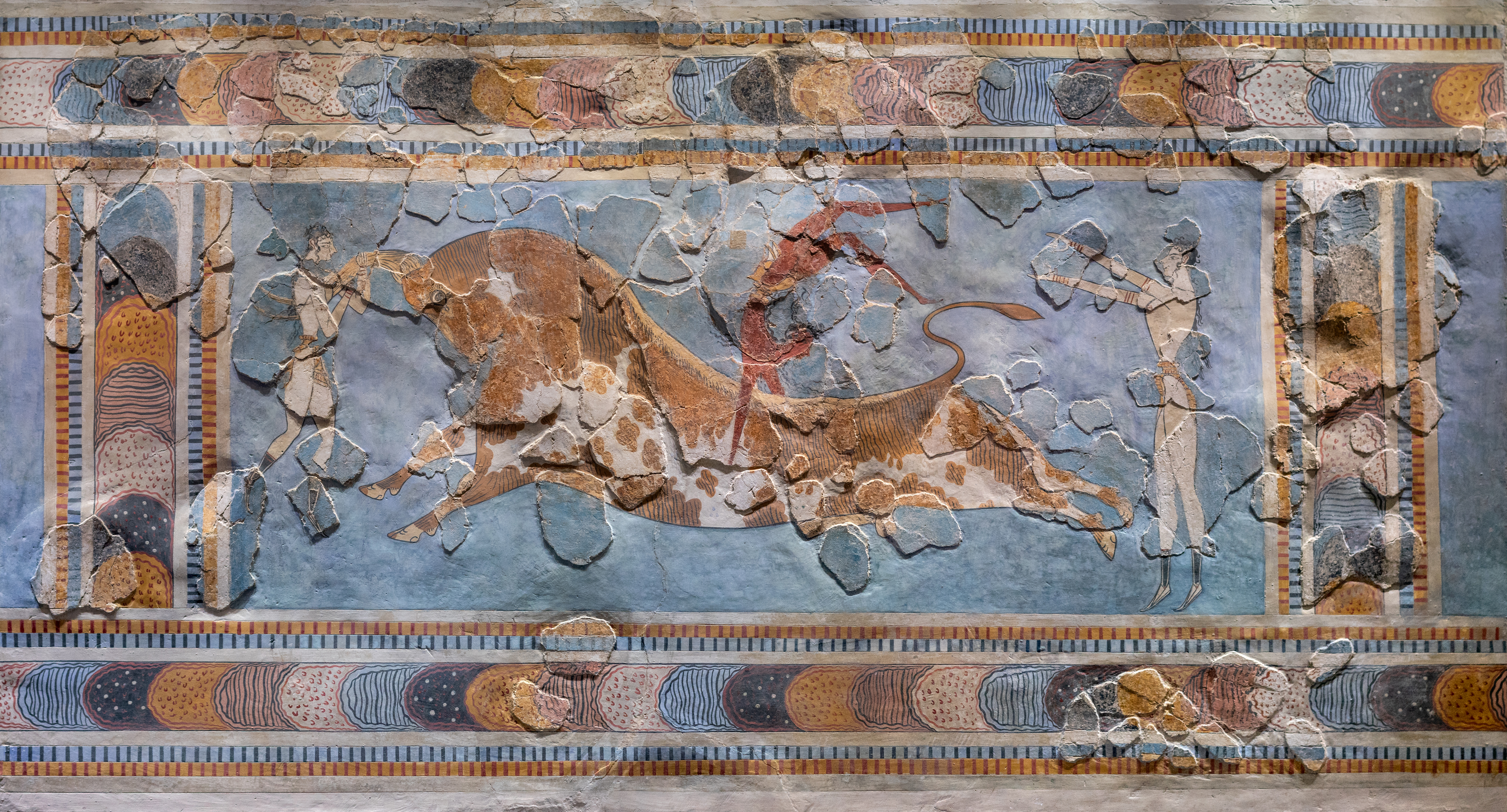
Bull-Leaping Fresco

The Minoans practised several sports including wrestling, bull jumping, acrobatics, and of course: boxing. This is apparent in multiple pieces of art, ranging from other frescoes, such as the Bull-Leaping Fresco, to pottery. The youth of the boys in the Akrotiri Boxer Fresco hints that athletes began training very early on in life, suggesting that sports were extremely important to Minoan society. It has even been suggested that athletics played a religious role in society due to their widespread practice.

The youth of athletes in many pieces of artwork indicates that athletic competition may have been a rite of passage into adulthood for the Minoans. Although there is much scholarly debate as to whether or not the gloves that the boys are wearing were meant to provide protection for the bones of the wearer or increase the amount of damage inflicted on the opponent, it is clear that except gloves, jewellery, and belts, competitors wore as little as possible. Due to the simplicity of the sport, it is quite possible that boxing was created as a means to settle disputes and eventually evolved into an athletic competition.

== Spinal deformity ==
The Akrotiri Boxer Fresco may have been the first example of a sports-related deformity ever recorded. According to a medical writer, the young boy on the right appears to have spondylolisthesis. But the anatomy in Minoan painting is often not very realistic.

== How frescoes are made ==
To achieve such vibrant colouration there are several techniques possible. In buon fresco, commonly known from Renaissance art, lime plaster was applied to the walls and then painted over while wet with colourful paint. In Minoan art, frescos often employed another technique as well known as fresco-secco. After the plaster and paint dried, extra paint was sometimes used to add details and would be applied with a binding agent. Some frescos are entirely created using this technique. The most common colours used in frescoes were green, blue, yellow, white, red, and black, all of which were derived from minerals and later fixed with organic material. Advanced geometric patterns suggest the usage of mechanical tools to improve the accuracy of the designs as well as a grid system for proportionality. As is common in other forms of Greek art such as pottery, male skin is generally painted red while females tend to be portrayed as white. In the Akrotiri Boxer Fresco, the youths' red skin suggests their gender while their partially shaved heads indicate that they are still children.
