= Museum of Prehistoric Thera =

Museum in Fira, Santorini, Greece

Coordinates: 36.4185°N 25.4370°E

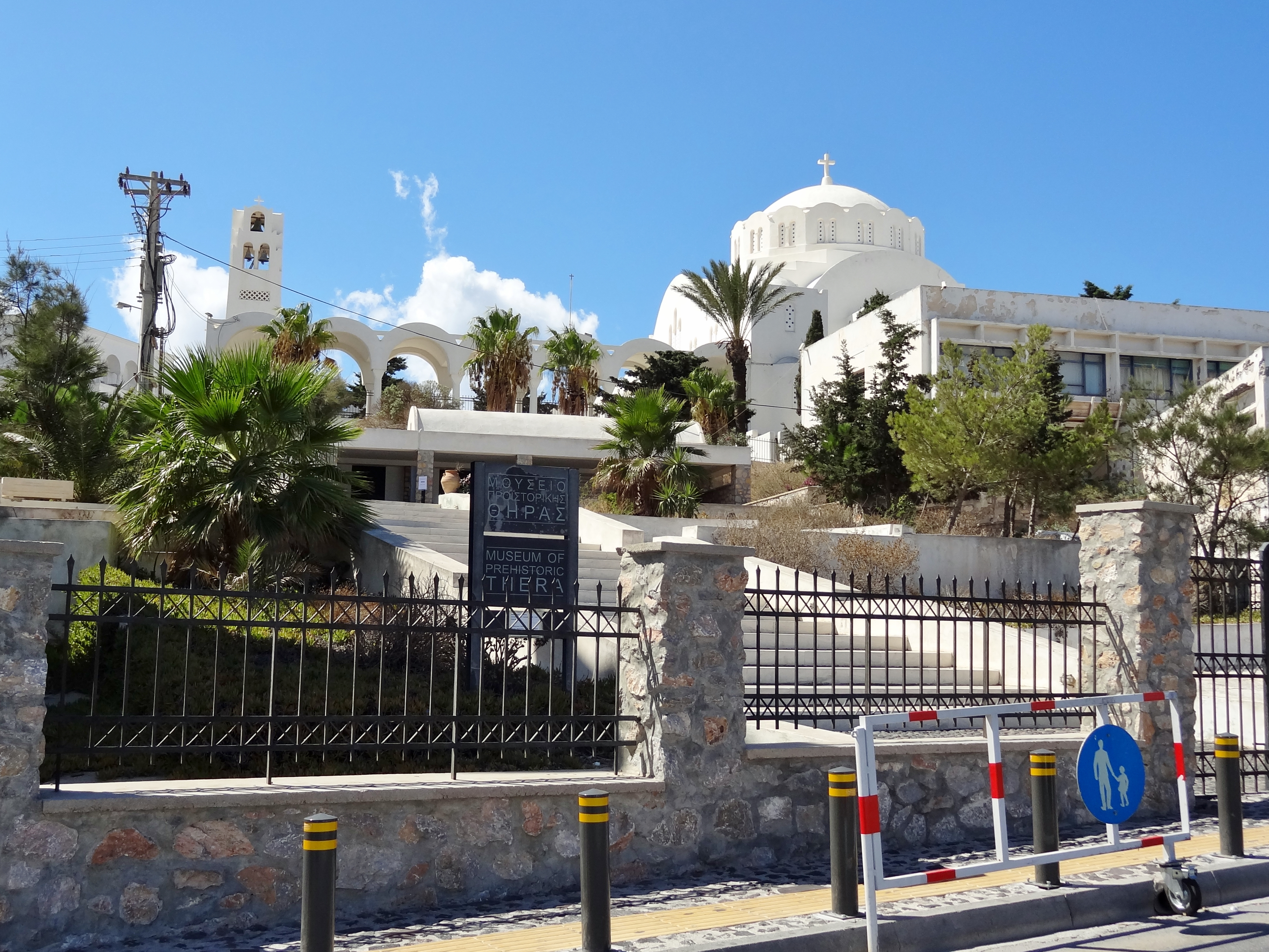
Museum of Prehistoric Thera entrance

The Museum of Prehistoric Thera (Greek: Μουσείο Προϊστορικής Θήρας) is located in Fira, on the island of Santorini in Greece. It was built on the site of the old Ypapanti Church which was destroyed in the 1956 Amorgos earthquake.

The Museum houses a very large number of ancient artifacts from various excavations on Santorini, such as at Akrotiri (southwest part of the island, located on a peninsula), and at the nearby Potamos site.

The earliest excavations on Santorini were conducted by French geologist F. Fouque in 1867, after some local people found old artifacts at a quarry. Later, in 1895-1900, the digs by German archeologist Baron Friedrich Hiller von Gaertringen revealed the ruins of ancient Thera on Mesa Vouno. He focused on the settlements of 9th century BC there, believed to be a Spartan colony.

Also, a little later, R. Zahn excavated in the locality of Potamos, under the auspices of the German Archaeological Institute at Athens.

The main excavations at Akrotiri were conducted under the direction of the Archaeological Society of Athens.

== Exposition ==
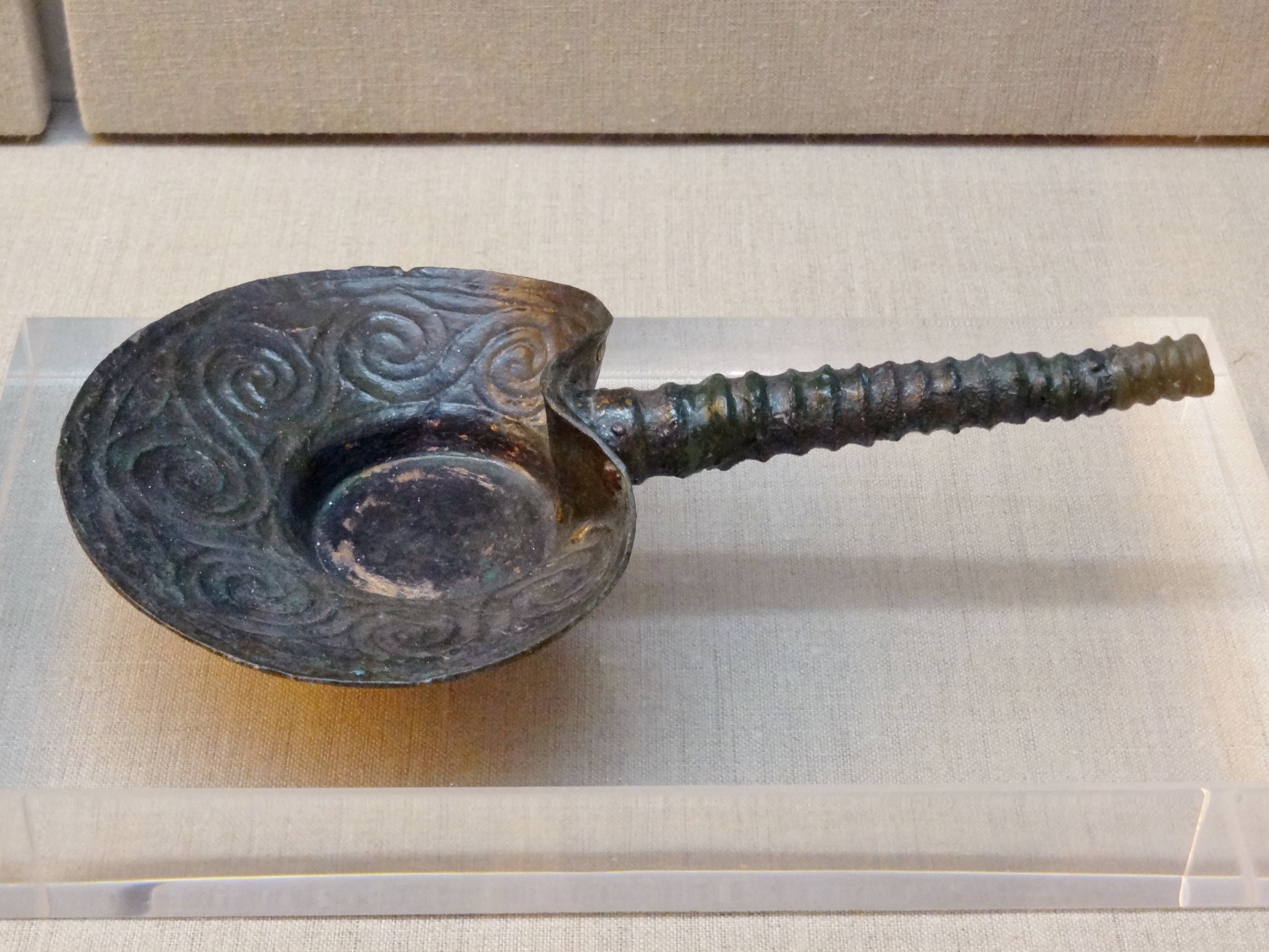
Bronze incense holder from Akrotiri, 1700 BC. Museum of Prehistoric Thera

The Museum covers the island's history starting from the Late Neolithic period to the Late Cycladic I period. The history of Akrotiri goes back to 3300 B.C., and the city flourished especially during the mature Late Cycladic I period (17th century B.C.); the artefacts from this period are abundantly illustrated.

The collections are ordered chronologically, and include ceramics, sculptures, jewellery, wall paintings, and ritual objects. The monumental art of wall-painting is represented in great detail. The island's complex network of contacts with the outside world is also explained.

The Museum illustrates the Neolithic pottery found on the island, and Early Cycladic marble figurines and pottery.

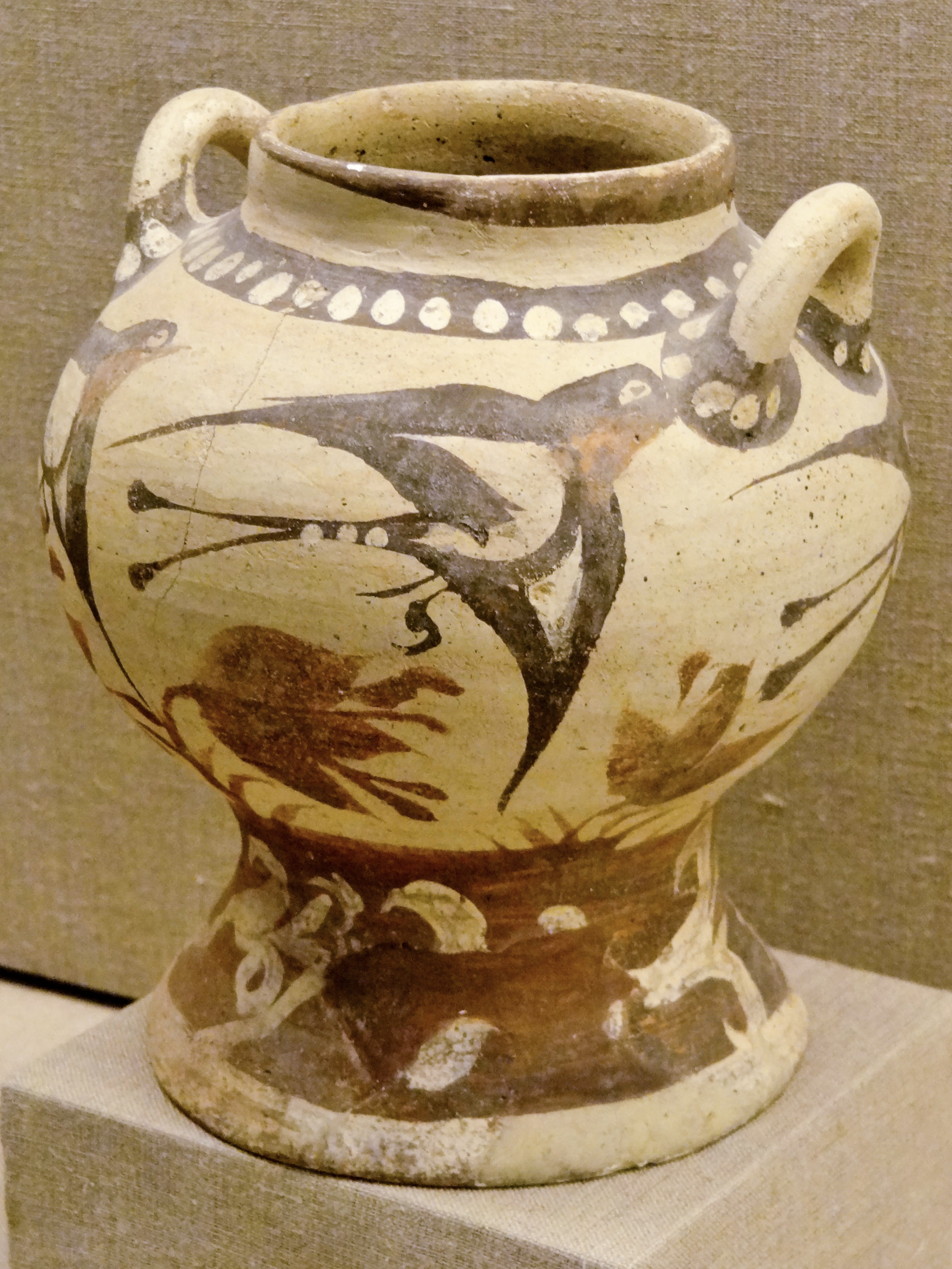
Ceramic pitcher with swallows from Akrotiri, 1700 BC. Museum of Prehistoric Thera

In particular, the 'Kastri group' of objects illustrates the transitional phase from Late Cycladic II to Late Cycladic III period. The relevant artefacts are from the Christiana islets and Akrotiri.

Middle Cycladic pottery is represented by a series of impressive bird jugs, often featuring swallows. These objects – dating to 20th-18th century B.C. -- were found at Ftellos, Megalochori and Akrotiri.

Early Cycladic metal artefacts from different sites are also represented.

== See also ==
- Ancient Thera
- Minoan civilization
