= La Parisienne (fresco) =

Minoan fresco in Knossos, Crete

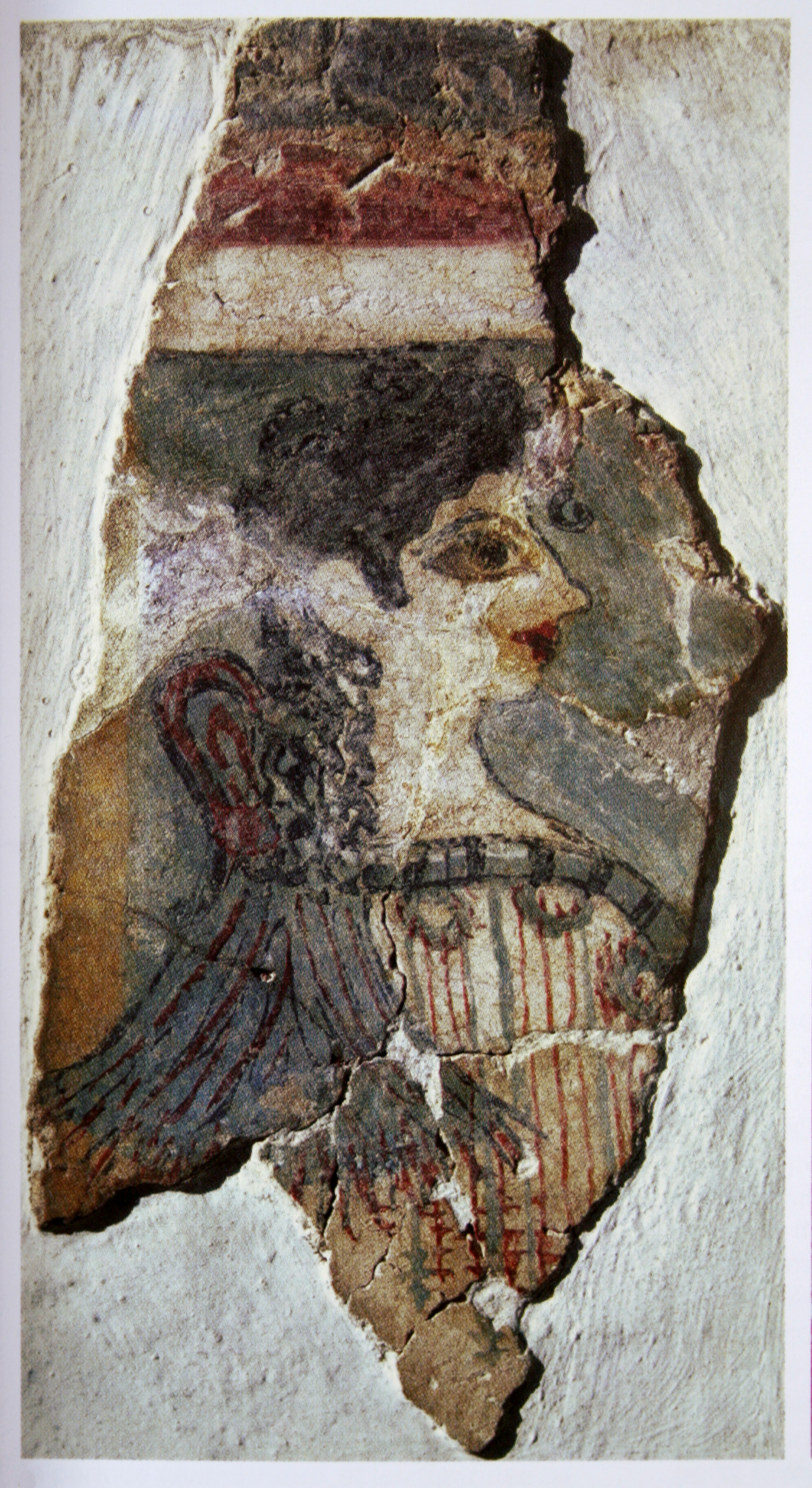
- Created: c. 1400 BC
- Discovered: before 1964; Knossos, Crete, Greece
- Present location: Heraklion, Crete, Greece

The Minoan fresco fragment known as La Parisienne, or sometimes the Minoan Lady, is part of the Camp Stool Fresco, which was probably painted on the wall of the Sanctuary Hall on the room sometimes called the piano nobile at the palace of Knossos on Crete. It dates to the Final Palatial Period, c. 1450–1350/1300 BC, and is now in the Heraklion Archaeological Museum.

The female figure is depicted in profile with a sacral knot worn at the back of the neck,this as well as size of the figure in comparison with the other figures on the Camp Stool fresco seems to indicate that the depicted woman is a person of importance, such as priestess or even a goddess. The presence of a twin figure (of which only a fragment is preserved) of the same size seems to show two goddesses presiding over religious rites. It has been described as a ceremonial banquet with libations being offered.

The fragment was excavated in 1901 by the British archaeologist Arthur Evans. Evans employed the services of Emile Gillieron to restore some of the excavated frescoes (including La Parisienne). While Evans seems to have earnestly attempted to have the recreations of the frescos rely on archaeological evidence, many of his conclusions stemmed from a desire to historicize Greek myths and this attitude of confirmation bias, it is thought influenced Gillieron and led to these recreations bordering on being almost complete inventions according to critics.

The French archaeologist and art historian, Edmond Pottier gave her the name "La Parisienne" as he felt she resembled a contemporary woman from Paris.

. . . Her disheveled hair, the provocative ‘kiss curl’ on her fore-head, her enormous eye and sensual mouth, stained a violent red . . . the mass of ribbons tossed over her shoulder in a ‘come-hither’ gesture, this mixture of naive archaism and spicy modernism . . . this Pasiphae who looks like an habitue of Parisian bars – everything about this work conspires to amaze us; in sum, there is something about the discovery of this unheard-of art that we ﬁnd stunning, even scandalous.

— Edmond Pottier, La revue de l'art ancien et moderne- Une excursion de Cnossos, p 119

One of the reasons critics argued for the fragment being changed too much was that Minoan women did not wear make-up and that this too was one of Gillierion's changes, but archaeological researches in Minoan palaces, cemeteries and settlements has brought to light a multitude of objects related to beautification. It seems that there were beautification areas in the palaces of Knossos, Zakros and Pylos. These beauty objects were used during the whole Aegean Bronze Age. By using these objects, the Minoan ladies highlighted the red lips and the white of the face. In the fresco of the Parisienne, the use of black for emphasizing the form of the eyes and red for the lips can clearly be seen.

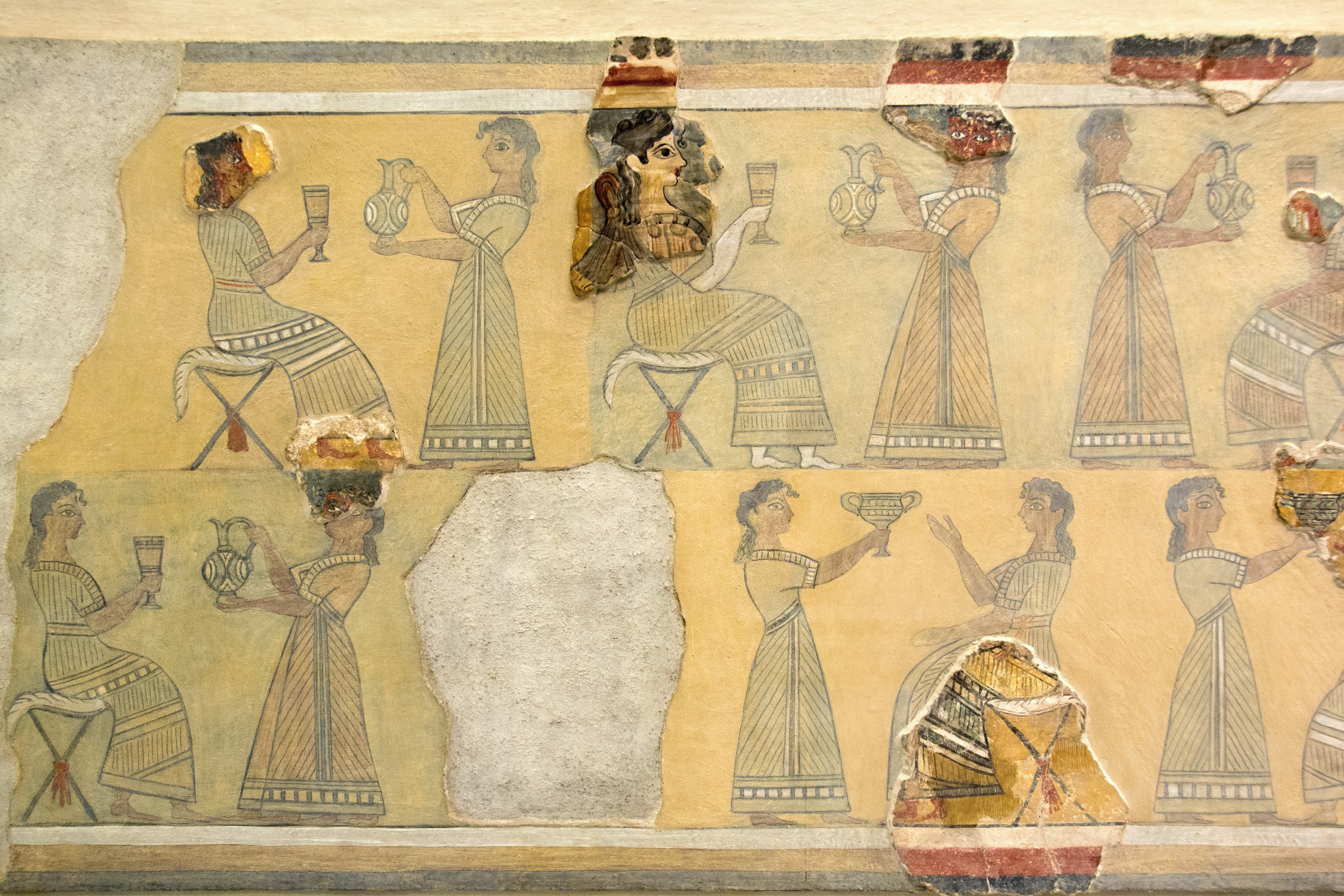
Proposed recreation of the Camp stool fresco (La Parisienne third from left upperfield) Archaeological Museum of Heraklion.

== See also ==
- List of Aegean frescos

== Bibliography ==
- A. Evans, The Palace of Minos at Knossos III repr. New York 1964
- A. Papaefthymiou-Papanthimou Utensils and toiletries of the Cretan-Mycenaean Age, Thessaloniki 1979
- Poursat, J.C., Les Ivoires myceniens, Paris 1977
- Palmer L, The Interpretation of Mycenaean Greek Texts, Oxford 1963.
