= Minoan eruption =

Major volcanic eruption around 1600 BC

Minoan eruption of Thera
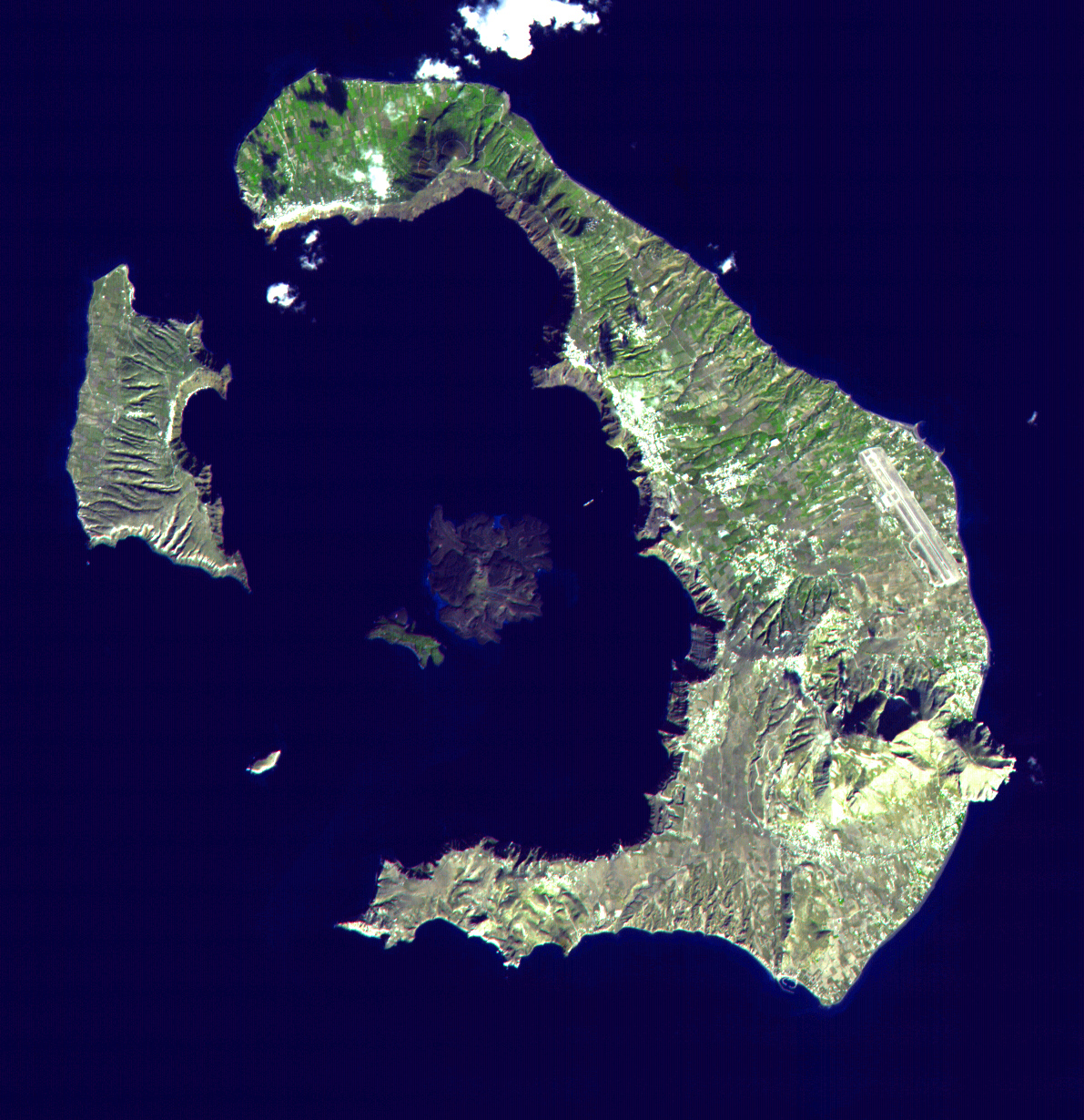
- Satellite image of Thera, November 21, 2000. The bay in the center of the island is the caldera created by the Minoan eruption.
- Volcano: Thera
- Date: c. 1600 BC (see below)
- Type: Plinian
- Location: Santorini, Cyclades, Aegean Sea; 36°24′36″N 25°24′00″E
- VEI: 7
- Impact: Devastated the Minoan settlements of Akrotiri, the island of Thera, communities and agricultural areas on nearby islands, and the coast of Crete with related earthquakes and tsunamis.

Maps

The Minoan eruption was a catastrophic volcanic eruption that devastated the Aegean island of Thera (also called Santorini) circa 1600 BC. It destroyed the Minoan settlement at Akrotiri, as well as communities and agricultural areas on nearby islands and the coast of Crete with subsequent earthquakes and tsunamis. With a Volcanic Explosivity Index (VEI) of 7, it resulted in the ejection of approximately 28–41 km^{3} (6.7–9.8 mi^{3}) of dense-rock equivalent (DRE), the eruption was one of the largest volcanic events in human history. Because tephra from the Minoan eruption serves as a marker horizon in nearly all archaeological sites in the Eastern Mediterranean, its precise date is of high importance and has been fiercely debated among archaeologists and volcanologists for decades, without coming to a definite conclusion.

Although there are no clear ancient records of the eruption, its plume and volcanic lightning may have been described in the Egyptian Tempest Stele, though recent studies have disputed this based on the carbon dating of early 18th Dynasty artefacts. The Chinese Bamboo Annals reported unusual yellow skies and summer frost at the beginning of the Shang dynasty, which may have been a consequence of volcanic winter (similar to 1816, the Year Without a Summer, after the 1815 eruption of Mount Tambora).

== Eruption ==
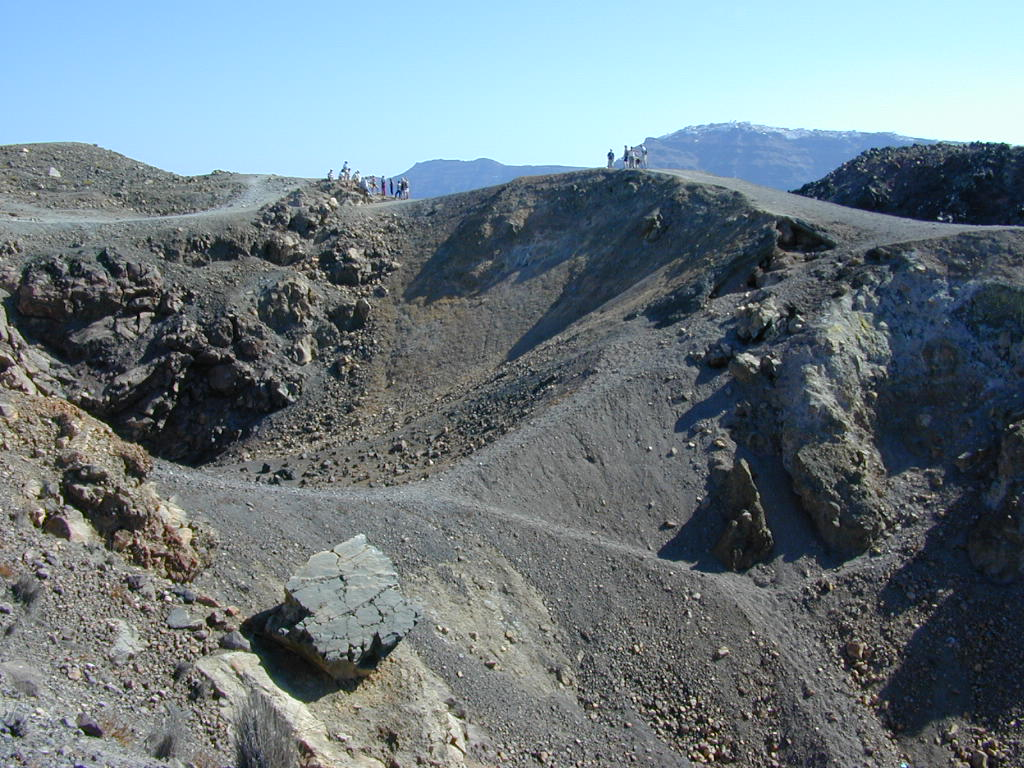
Volcanic craters on Santorini, June 2001

=== Background ===
Geological evidence shows the Thera volcano erupted numerous times over several hundred thousand years before the Minoan eruption. In a repeating process, the volcano would violently erupt, then eventually collapse into a roughly circular seawater-filled caldera, with numerous small islands forming the circle. The caldera would slowly refill with magma, building a new volcano, which erupted and then collapsed in an ongoing cyclical process.

Immediately before the Minoan eruption, the walls of the caldera formed a nearly continuous ring of islands, with the only entrance between Thera and the tiny island of Aspronisi. This cataclysmic eruption was centered on a small island just north of the existing island of Nea Kameni in the centre of the then-existing caldera. The northern part of the caldera was refilled by the volcanic ash and lava, then collapsed again.

=== Magnitude ===
The magnitude of the eruption, particularly the submarine pyroclastic flows, has been difficult to estimate because the majority of the erupted products were deposited in the sea. Together, these challenges result in considerable uncertainty regarding the volume of the Minoan eruption, with estimates ranging between 13–86 km^{3} (3.1–20.6 mi^{3}) DRE.

According to the latest analysis of marine sediments and seismic data gathered during ocean research expeditions from 2015 to 2019, the estimated volume of the material expelled during the volcanic eruption ranges from 28–41 km^{3} (6.7–9.8 mi^{3}) DRE.

The study revealed that the initial Plinian eruption was the most voluminous phase, ejecting 14–21 km^{3} (3.4–5.0 mi^{3}) magma and accounting for half of total erupted materials. This was followed by 3–4 km^{3} (0.72–0.96 mi^{3}) DRE co-ignimbrite fall, 5–9 km^{3} (1.2–2.2 mi^{3}) DRE pyroclastic flows and 5–7 km^{3} (1.2–1.7 mi^{3}) DRE intra-caldera deposits.

This eruption is comparable with the 1815 eruption of Mount Tambora, the 1257 Samalas eruption, Lake Taupo's Hatepe eruption around AD 230, and the 946 eruption of Paektu Mountain, which are among the largest eruptions in the last two thousand years.

=== Sequence ===
On Santorini, there is a 60 m (200 ft) thick layer of white tephra that overlies the soil clearly delineating the ground level before the eruption. This layer has three distinct bands that indicate the different phases of the eruption. Studies have identified four major eruption phases, and one minor precursory tephra fall. The thinness of the first ash layer, along with the lack of noticeable erosion of that layer by winter rains before the next layer was deposited, indicate that the volcano gave the local population a few months' warning. Since no human remains have been found at the Akrotiri site, this preliminary volcanic activity probably caused the island's population to flee. It is also suggested that several months before the eruption, Santorini experienced one or more earthquakes, which damaged the local settlements.

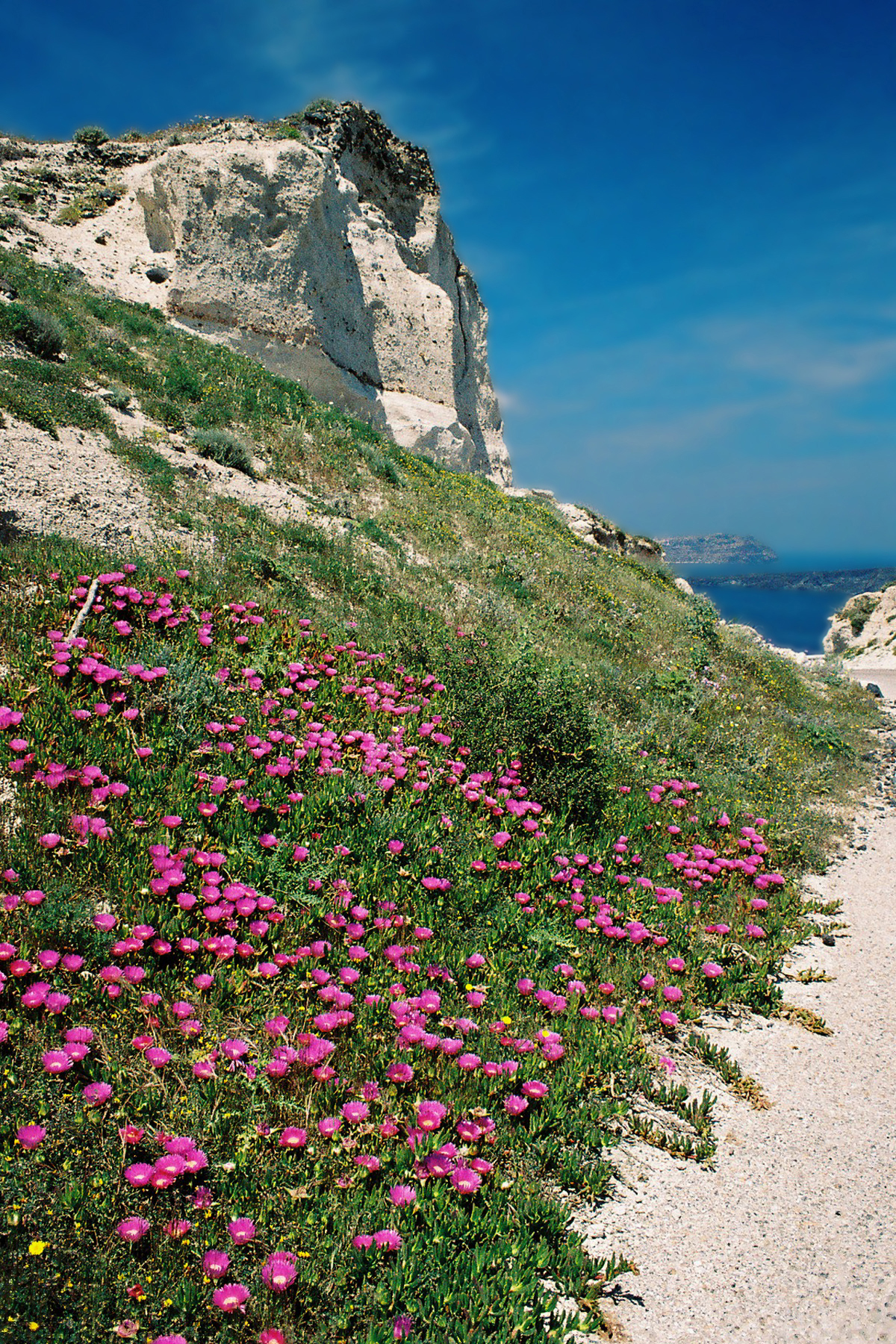
Early phase of Late-Bronze-Age volcano eruption (~ 1500 BC), southern border of the Caldera island. The lower layer of pumice is finer, almost white and without rock intrusions.

Intense magmatic activity of the first major phase (BO_{1}/Minoan A) of the eruption deposited up to 7 m (23 ft) of pumice and ash, with a minor lithic component, southeast and east. Archaeological evidence indicated burial of man-made structures with limited damage. The second (BO_{2}/Minoan B) and third (BO_{3}/Minoan C) eruption phases involved pyroclastic surges and lava fountaining, as well as the possible generation of tsunamis. Man-made structures not buried during Minoan A were completely destroyed. The third phase was also characterized by the initiation of caldera collapse. The fourth, and last, major phase (BO_{4}/Minoan D) was marked by varied activity: lithic-rich base surge deposits, lava flows, lahar floods, and co-ignimbrite ash-fall deposits. This phase was characterized by the completion of caldera collapse, which produced megatsunamis.

== Geomorphology ==
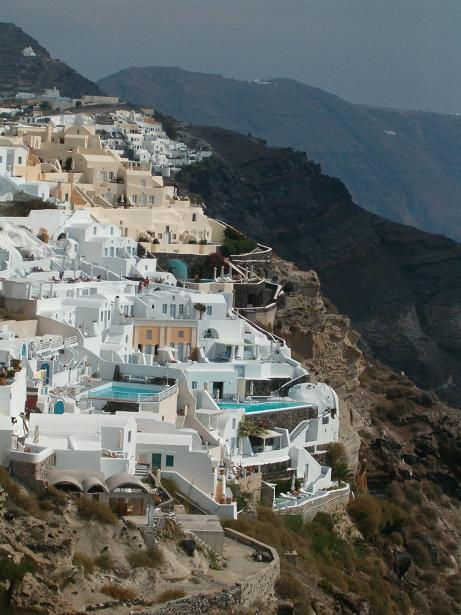
Mansions and hotels atop steep cliffs.

Although the fracturing process is not yet known, the altitudinal statistical analysis indicates that the caldera had formed just before the eruption. The area of the island was smaller, and the southern and eastern coastlines appeared regressed. During the eruption, the landscape was covered by the pumice sediments. In some places, the coastline vanished under thick tuff depositions. In others, recent coastlines were extended towards the sea. After the eruption, the geomorphology of the island was characterized by an intense erosional phase during which the pumice was progressively removed from the higher altitudes to the lower ones.

== Volcanology ==
The eruption was of the Plinian type, involving rhyodacite, and it resulted in an estimated 30 to 35 km (19 to 22 mi) high eruption column which reached the stratosphere. In addition, the magma underlying the volcano came into contact with the shallow marine embayment, resulting in violent phreatomagmatic blasts.

The eruption also generated 35 to 150 m (115 to 492 ft) high tsunamis that devastated the northern coastline of Crete, 110 km (68 mi) away. The tsunami affected coastal towns such as Amnisos, where building walls were knocked out of alignment. On the island of Anafi, 27 km (17 mi) to the east, ash layers 3 m (10 ft) deep have been found, as well as pumice layers on slopes 250 m (820 ft) above sea level.

Elsewhere in the Mediterranean are pumice deposits that could have been sent by the Thera eruption. Ash layers in cores drilled from the seabed and from lakes in Turkey show that the heaviest ashfall was towards the east and northeast of Santorini. The ash found on Crete is now known to have been from a precursory phase of the eruption, some weeks or months before the main eruptive phases, and it would have had little impact on the island. Santorini ash deposits were at one time claimed to have been found in the Nile Delta, but this is now known to be a misidentification.

== Eruption dating ==
The Minoan eruption is an important marker horizon for the Bronze Age chronology of the Eastern Mediterranean realm. It provides a fixed point for aligning the entire chronology of the second millennium BC in the Aegean, as evidence of the eruption is found throughout the region. Yet, archaeological dating based on typological sequencing and the Egyptian chronology is significantly younger than the radiocarbon age of the Minoan eruption, by roughly a century. This age discrepancy has resulted in a fierce debate about whether there is an upheaval in the archaeological synchronization between the Aegean and Egypt.

=== Archaeology ===
Archaeologists developed the Late Bronze Age chronologies of eastern Mediterranean cultures by analyzing design styles of artifacts found in each archaeological layer. If the type of artifacts can be accurately assigned, then the layer's position in a chronological order can be determined. This is known as sequence dating or seriation. In Aegean chronology, however, the frequent exchange of objects and styles enables relative chronology to be compared with the absolute chronology of Egypt, so absolute dates could be determined in the Aegean.

Since the Minoan eruption has been conclusively placed in late/end Late Minoan IA (LM-IA) in the Crete chronology, late/end Late Helladic I (LH-I) in the mainland chronology, the contention concerns which Egyptian period was contemporaneous with LM-IA and LM-IB. Decades of intensive archaeological work and seriation on Crete in the last century had confidently correlated the late LM-IA with Dynasty XVIII in Egypt and the end of LM-IA at the start of Thutmose III. Stone vessels discovered in the Shaft Graves in LH-I are also of the New Kingdom type. Multiple archaeological sites of Theran pumice workshops used by the local inhabitants are only found in the New Kingdom strata. A milk bowl on Santorini used before the volcanic eruption has a New Kingdom pottery style. An Egyptian inscription on the Ahmose Tempest Stele recorded an extraordinary cataclysm resembling the Minoan eruption. Taken together, the archaeological evidence points to an eruption date after the accession of Ahmose I. The year of accession based on the conventional Egyptian chronology and radiocarbon-based chronology is either 1550 BC and 1570–1544 BC (IntCal04) or 1569–1548 BC (IntCal20). The archaeological evidence argues for a Theran eruption date between circa 1550 and 1480 BC.

Proponents of an earlier date argue that Aegean-Egyptian pottery correlation allows considerable flexibility. Several other archaeological interpretations of LM-IA and LM-IB pottery differ from the "traditional" and could be consistent with a much earlier beginning time for LM-IA and LM-IB. Pottery synchronisms were also assessed to be less secure before the LM-IIIAI/Amenhotep III period. Pumice in workshops and the inscription on the Tempest Stele have been argued to only reflect the lower bound of the eruption age. The date of the production of pottery with the Santorini milk bowl style in other regions has not been determined and could pre-date the Minoan eruption. The chronology of stone vessel styles during this critical period is lacking.

=== Radiocarbon age ===
A major cause of inaccuracy in raw radiocarbon dates is fluctuation in the level of atmospheric radiocarbon. Hence, raw dates are adjusted with calibration curves which are periodically updated by international researchers. Derived calibrated calendar date ranges are highly dependent on how accurately the calibration curve represents radiocarbon levels for the time period. As of 2022, the most updated calibration curve is IntCal20. Early radiocarbon dates in the 1970s with calibration were already showing massive age disagreement and were initially discarded as unreliable by the archaeological community. In the following decades, the range of possible eruption dates narrowed significantly with improved calibration, analytical precision, statistical methods, and sample treatment. Radiocarbon dating has built a strong case for an eruption date in the late 17th century BC. The table below summarizes the history and results of radiocarbon dating of volcanic destruction layer with pre-2018 calibration curves:

List of radiocarbon dates with calibration curve published before 2018
Source	Calibrated date (95% CI)	Calibration used	Sample context and statistical method
Hammer et al., 1987	1675–1525 BC	Pearson and Stuiver, 1986	Weighted average of 13 samples from volcanic destruction layer at Akrotiri (VDL)
Ramsey et al., 2004	1663–1599 BC	INTCAL98	Bayesian model of sequence of samples from before, during and after eruption
Manning et al., 2006	1683–1611 BC	IntCal04	Bayesian model of sequence of samples from before, during and after eruption
Friedrich et al., 2006	1627–1600 BC	IntCal04	Wiggle-matching of olive tree buried alive in pumice layer
Manning et al., 2010	1660–1611 BC	IntCal09	Bayesian model of sequence of samples from before, during and after eruption
Höflmayer et al., 2012	1660–1602 BC 1630–1600 BC (2)	IntCal09	Tau boundary function on 28 samples from VDL Wiggle-matching of olive tree buried alive in VDL (2)
Pearson et al., 2018	1664–1614 BC 1646–1606 BC (2) 1626–1605 BC (3)	IntCal13	Weighted average of 28 samples from VDL Tau boundary function on the 28 samples from VDL (2) Wiggle-matching of olive tree buried alive in pumice layer (3)

In 2018, a team led by tree ring scientists reported a possible offset of a few decades in the previous IntCal calibration curves during the period 1660–1540 BC. The resulting new calibration curve allowed previous raw radiocarbon dates to be calibrated to encompass a substantial part of the 16th century BC, making it possible for radiocarbon dates to be compatible with archaeological evidence. The measured offset was then confirmed by other laboratories across the world and incorporated into the most updated calibration curve: IntCal20. In the same year, a study examining the bomb peak further questioned the validity of wiggle-matching of the olive branch, arguing that growth cessation could cause the radiocarbon dates of the outermost brand layer to differ by up to a few decades and potentially allowing the olive branch to pre-date Thera by decades.

In 2020, speculation of regional offset specific to Mediterranean context in all calibration curves was reported based on measurements made on juniper wood at Gordion. If the regional offset is genuine, then calibration based on the regional dataset, Hd GOR, would place the eruption date back to the 17th century BC. Others have argued that these site-specific offsets are already incorporated into the IntCal20 prediction interval since it is constructed from a much wider range of locations and any locational variation is of similar magnitude to the inter-laboratory variation.

While the refined calibration curve IntCal20 does not rule out a 17th-century BC eruption date, it does shift the probable range of the eruption date to include the majority of the 16th century BC, offering a way to at least mitigate the long-standing age disagreement. However, the exact year of eruption has yet to be settled. The table below summarizes the dating results:

List of volcanic destruction layer (VDL) radiocarbon dates with calibration curve published after 2018
Source	Calibrated date (posterior probability)	Calibration used	Sample context and statistical method
Manning et al., 2020	1663–1612 BC (87.5%)	Hd GOR	Bayesian model of sequence of samples from before, during and after eruption
Manning et al., 2020	1619–1596 BC (64.7%) 1576–1545 BC (22.9%)	IntCal20	Bayesian model of sequence of samples from before, during and after eruption
Şahoğlu et al., 2022	1612–1573 BC (19.4%) 1565–1501 BC (76.1%)	IntCal20	The youngest sample near victims from Theran tsunami layer at Çeşme
Ehrlich et al., 2021	1624–1528 BC	IntCal20	Eight scenarios of olive wood growth to account for possible growth cessation
Manning, 2022	1609–1560 BC (95.4%)	IntCal20	Bayesian model of sequence of samples from before, during and after eruption but more comprehensive to include samples from VDL, tsunami and distal fallout from across southern Aegean region
Pearson et al., 2023	1610–1510 BC (95.4%) 1602–1502 BC (95.4%)	IntCal20	Therasia olive shrub

=== Ice cores, tree rings and speleothems ===
An eruption of Theran magnitude is expected to leave a detectable signal in various environmental records like ice cores and tree rings. Petrologic constraints on Minoan magma yields a range of 0.3–35.9 trillion grams of released sulfur. The higher end of the estimate could cause severe climatic change and leave detectable signals in ice cores and tree rings. Notably, tree ring dating allows extremely precise dating to the exact calendar year of each ring with virtually no age uncertainty, and from properties of the annual tree rings local climate record could be reconstructed down to sub-annual precision.

In 1987, a major Greenland sulfate spike in 1644 ± 20 BC in ice core chronology was hypothesized to be caused by the Minoan eruption based on the early radiocarbon results of Hammer et al. In 1988, a major environmental disruption and extreme global-cooling/frost-ring in 1627 ± 0 BC were also revealed through precisely dated frost rings and hypothesized to be related to the Minoan eruption.

Archaeologists who preferred a late 16th-century BC eruption date were neither convinced by the 1644 ± 20 BC sulfate spike nor by the 1627 BC frost ring, because evidence of causality between the two events and Minoan eruption was absent.

Since 2003, multiple independent studies of major elements and trace elements of volcanic ash retrieved from the 1644 ± 20 BC sulfate layer failed to match the ash to that of Santorini. All of these independent studies attributed the ash to another large eruption during this period, the eruption of Mount Aniakchak, thus ruling out the Minoan eruption as the cause of the sulfate spike. In 2019, a revision of the Greenland ice-core chronology was proposed based on synchronization of the frost-ring data and the major sulfate spike, and the revised date for the Aniakchak eruption was shifted to 1628 BC. The Greenland ice core chronology offset was independently confirmed by other teams and adopted into Greenland Ice Core Chronology 2021 (GICC21). The 1627 BC extreme global cooling was subsequently attributed to the major Aniakchak eruption without invoking the Theran eruption. An eruption date of 1627 BC is also no longer supported by radiocarbon evidence with the most recent calibration curve IntCal20.

In light of much younger radiocarbon dates and revised ice core chronology, several possible ice core and tree ring signals in the 17th and 16th century BC have been proposed. The list below summarizes the tree ring and ice core signals that may have been caused by the Minoan eruption:

List of proposed Minoan eruption dates suggested by environmental anomalies
Date	Environmental context	Records	Ref
1681–1673 BC	Tree ring	increases of sulfur, calcium, and rare earth elements in Mediterranean tree ring 857, possibly caused by volcanic eruption in this region	
1654 BC	Ice core and tree ring	one of largest sulfate spikes recorded in Greenland in the last 4,000 years, estimated 50 trillion grams of sulfur; frost-damaged ring in 1653 BC followed by ring-width minima in 1652 BC	
1649 BC	Tree ring	ring-width minima	
1619 BC	Tree ring	narrow ring	
1611 BC	Ice core	sulfate spike, estimated 2–8 trillion grams of sulfur	
1597 BC	Tree ring	ring-width minima	
1561 BC	Ice core and tree ring	large sulfate spike, estimated 22 trillion grams of sulfur; ring growth reduced in 1560 BC; calcium depletion in Mediterranean tree ring in 1560 BC possibly caused by volcanic eruption in this region	
1558 BC	Ice core	sulfate spike, estimated 10 trillion grams of sulfur	
1555 BC	Ice core and tree ring	sulfate spike, estimated 6 trillion grams of sulfur; reduced ring growth in 1554 BC	
1546 BC	Tree ring	reduced tree ring growth	
1544 BC	Tree ring	ring-width minima	
1539 BC	Ice core	sulfate spike, estimated 6 trillion grams of sulfur	
1524 BC	Tree ring	ring-width minima	

The date of Minoan eruption does not necessarily have to be in one of the years listed in the table, because the eruption may not have been environmentally impactful enough to leave any detectable signal.

In addition, a stalagmite from Turkey shows bromine peaks at 1621 ± 25 BC, molybdenum at 1617 ± 25 BC and sulfur at 1589 ± 25 BC. The authors interpreted that all three peaks were caused by a single volcanic eruption in the Mediterranean region and the time difference was related to differences in their retention rates. Others have suggested that the sulfur peak may have been related to the 1561 BC chemical anomaly recorded in Mediterranean tree rings.

== Historical impact ==
=== Akrotiri ===
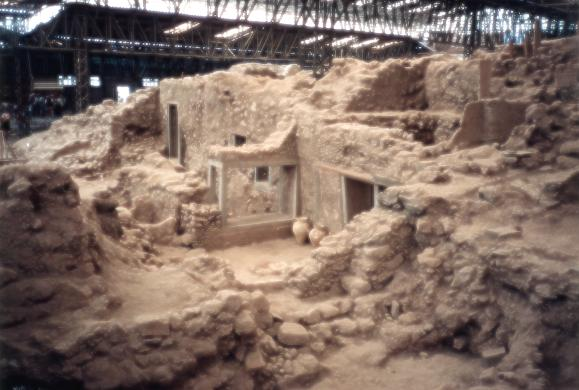
Excavation of Akrotiri on Thera

The eruption devastated the settlement at Akrotiri on Santorini, which was entombed in a layer of pumice and ash. Evidence at the site suggests that survivors returned and attempted to recover their possessions and perhaps to bury victims.

=== Minoan Crete ===
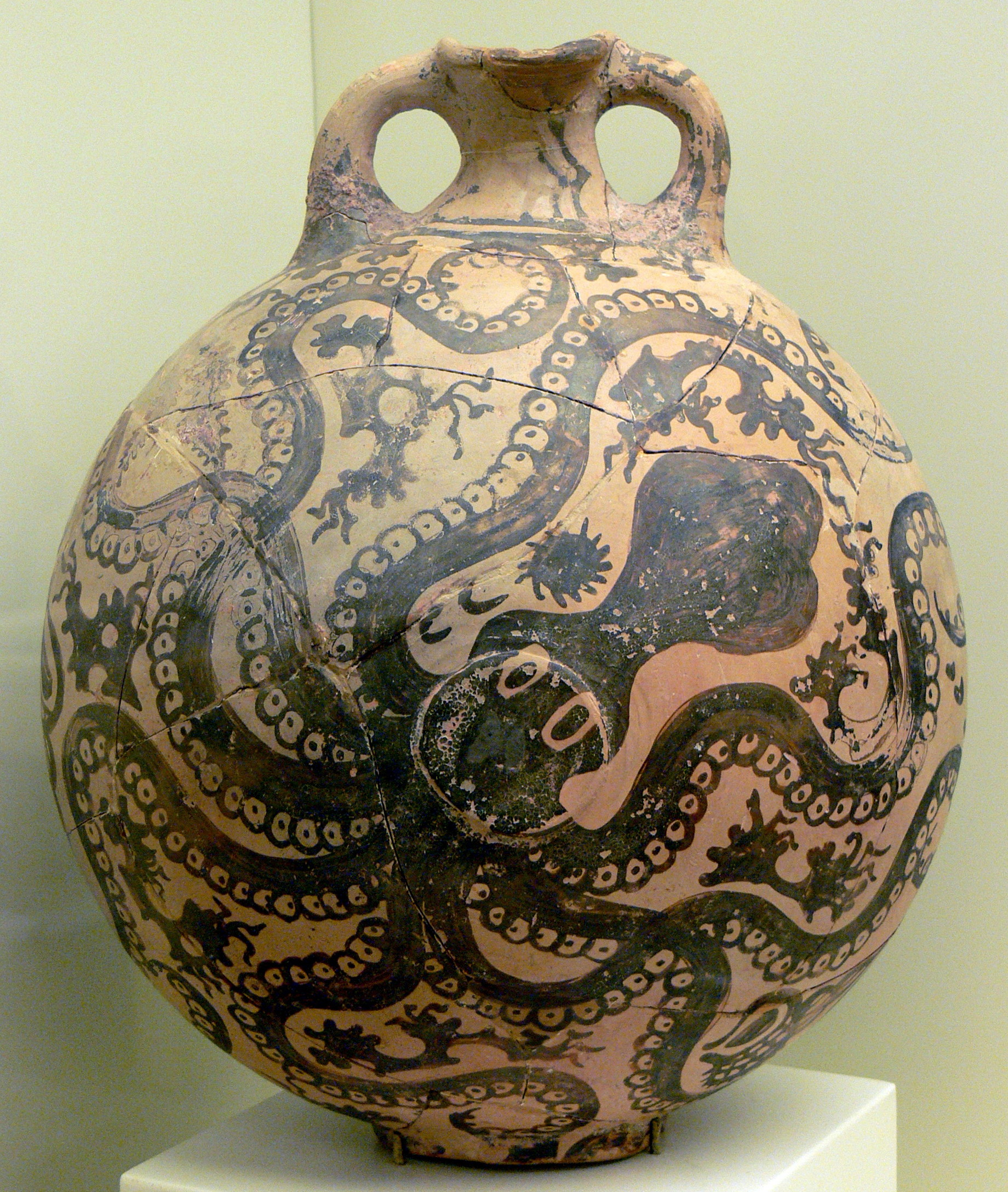
A Marine Style vase, typical of the Late Minoan IB period that followed the eruption of Thera.

The eruption was felt at Minoan sites on Crete. In northeastern Crete, earthquakes destroyed sites including Petras, while 9 meter high tsunamis swept over coastal sites such as Palaikastro. Ash and pumice fell across the island, where it was sometimes collected and stored.

After the eruption, the Minoans quickly recovered, and the subsequent period is considered the zenith of Minoan culture. Many affected sites were rebuilt, including Petras and Palaikastro, at the latter of which, new buildings were constructed using high quality ashlar masonry. New Minoan palaces were constructed at Zakros and Phaistos. However, other sites fell into decline, including Galatas and Kommos.

The longer-term impact of the eruption remains a matter of debate. The immediate aftermath saw a number of puzzling cultural changes including the filling in of lustral basins. In their book The Troubled Island, Driessen and MacDonald argued that the richness of the post-eruption material culture masked deep economic and political problems that eventually led to the collapse of Neopalatial society. Subsequent evidence suggests that this was not a general pattern across the island.

=== Chinese records ===
A volcanic winter from an eruption in the late 17th century BC has been claimed by some researchers to correlate with entries in later Chinese records documenting the collapse of the semi-legendary Xia dynasty in China. According to the Bamboo Annals, the collapse of the dynasty and the rise of the Shang dynasty, approximately dated to 1618 BC, were accompanied by "yellow fog, a dim sun, then three suns, frost in July, famine, and the withering of all five cereals".

=== Effect on Egyptian history ===
Apocalyptic rainstorms, which devastated much of Egypt and were described on the Tempest Stele of Ahmose I, have been attributed to short-term climatic changes caused by the Theran eruption. The dates and regnal dates of Ahmose I are in some dispute with Egyptologists (leaving aside alternate chronologies). Proposed reigns range from 1570–1546 BC to 1539–1514 BC. A radiocarbon dating of his mummy produced a mean value of 1557 BC. In any case, this would only provide an overlap with the later estimates of the eruption date. In 2025, carbon dating of early 18th Dynasty building materials, such as mudbricks from temples of Ahmose I, suggested dates inconsistent with the eruption of Thera.

Alternatively, if the eruption occurred in the Second Intermediate Period, the absence of Egyptian records of the eruption could be caused by the general disorder in Egypt around that time.

While it has been argued that the damage attributed to these storms may have been caused by an earthquake following the Thera eruption, it has also been suggested that the same damage resulted from a war with the Hyksos, with the storm reference metaphorically representing the chaos the Pharaoh was attempting to impose order upon. Other ancient Egyptian documents depict storms which are clearly figurative, such as Hatshepsut's Speos Artemidos. Research indicates that the Speos Artemidos stele is a reference to Hatshepsut overcoming the powers of chaos and darkness.

=== Greek traditions ===
==== The Titanomachy ====
The eruption of Thera and volcanic fallout may have inspired the myths of the Titanomachy in Hesiod's Theogony. The story may have absorbed elements of western Anatolian folk memory, especially those circulating in the eastern Aegean. In this sense, the Hesiodic version of the myth could have incorporated eastern influences as the narrative tradition took shape in mainland Greece, further west.

Hesiod's lines have been compared with volcanic activity, citing Zeus's thunderbolts as volcanic lightning, the boiling earth and sea as a breach of the magma chamber, immense flame and heat as evidence of phreatic explosions, among many other descriptions.

==== Atlantis ====
Spyridon Marinatos, the discoverer of the Akrotiri archaeological site, suggested that the Minoan eruption is reflected in Plato's story of Atlantis. This view remains prevalent in popular culture, as reflected in TV programs such as BBC's Atlantis. However, this view is not supported by current scholarship.

=== The Exodus ===
Geologist Barbara J. Sivertsen seeks to establish a link between the eruption of Santorini (c. 1600 BC) and the Exodus of the Israelites from Egypt in the Bible.

== See also ==
- Chronology of the ancient Near East
- Timeline of volcanism on Earth
- 1883 eruption of Krakatoa
