= Tempest Stele =

Stele erected by pharaoh Ahmose I in Egypt

The Tempest Stele (alt. Storm Stele) was erected by pharaoh Ahmose I early in the 18th Dynasty of Egypt, c. 1550 BCE. The stele describes a great storm striking Egypt during this time, destroying tombs, temples and pyramids in the Theban region and the work of restoration ordered by the king.

== Text ==
Broken pieces of this stele were found in the 3rd pylon of the temple of Karnak at Thebes between 1947 and 1951 by French archaeologists. It was restored and published by Claude Vandersleyen in 1967 and 1968.

The part of the stele that describes the storm is the most damaged part of the stele, with many lacunae in the meteorological description. The other parts of the stele are much better preserved.

Here are some descriptions of the storm.

(7) ... ...the gods expressed

(8) their discontent... The gods (made?) the sky come with a tempest of (rain?); it caused darkness in the Western region; the sky was

(9) unleashed, without ... ... more than the roar of the crowd; ... was powerful... on the mountains more than the turbulence of the

(10) cataract which is at Elephantine. Each house, ... each shelter (or each covered place) that they reached...

(11)... were floating in the water like the barks of papyrus (on the outside?) of the royal residence for... day(s)...

(12) with no one able to light the torch anywhere. Then His Majesty said 'How these (events) surpass the power of the great god and the wills of the divinities!' And His Majesty descended

(13) in his boat, his council following him. The (people were?) at the east and the west, silent, for they had no more clothes (?) on them...

(14) after the power of the god was manifested. Then His Majesty arrived in Thebes ... this statue; it received what it had desired.

(15) His Majesty set about to strengthen the Two Lands, to cause the water to evacuate without (the aid of) his (men?), to provide them with silver,

(16) with gold, with copper, with oil, with clothing, with all the products they desired; after which His Majesty rested in the palace – life, health, strength.

(17) It was then that His Majesty was informed that the funerary concessions had been invaded (by the water), that the sepulchral chambers had been damaged, that the structures of funerary enclosures had been undermined, that the pyramids had collapsed(?)

(18) all that existed had been annihilated. His Majesty then ordered the repair of the chapels which had fallen in ruins in all the country, restoration of the

(19) monuments of the gods, the re-erection of their precincts, the replacement of the sacred objects in the room of appearances, the re-closing of the secret place, the re-introduction

(20) into their naoi of the statues which were lying on the ground, the re-erection of the fire altars, the replacement of the offering tables back on their feet, to assure them the provision of offerings,

(21) the augmentation of the revenues of the personnel, the restoration of the country to its former state. They carried out everything, as the king had ordered it.

== Interpretations ==
=== Royal propaganda ===
One interpretation is that the stele is propaganda put out by the pharaoh, to cover up the supposed depredations of officials of the embattled 17th Dynasty drawing upon the financial resources of the temples during the escalating conflict with the Hyksos.

=== Thera eruption ===
The argument has been made that there was "a meteorological event of far-reaching proportions, one of the major aftereffects, we strongly suspect, of the Thera eruption" and that the stele reflects an eye-witness account of the eruption. Others argue that given the description in the stele, this is unlikely. Archaeologists have traditionally placed the date of the Theran eruption at approximately 1500 BCE. Radiocarbon dates, including analysis of an olive branch buried beneath a lava flow from the volcano that gave a date between 1627 BCE and 1600 BCE (95% credible interval), suggest an eruption date more than a century earlier than suggested by archaeologists. Thus, the radiocarbon dates and the archaeological dates are in substantial disagreement.

In 2014, Nadine Moeller and Robert Ritner offered a new translation of the Tempest Stela. They believe the unusual weather patterns described on the slab were the result of a massive volcano explosion at Thera. They also suggest that the Egyptian pharaoh Ahmose I ruled at a time closer to the Thera eruption than previously thought; in the conventional but disputed Egyptian chronology he ruled from c. 1539–1514 BC. The time of Ahmose I rule is under dispute for other reasons, and he has been assigned a reign from 1570–1546, 1560–1537, 1551–1527 and 1539–1514 by various sources. A medical examination of his mummy indicates that he died when he was about thirty-five, supporting a 25-year reign if he came to the throne at the age of 10. The radiocarbon date range for the start of his reign is 1570–1544 BC, the mean point of which is 1557 BC. Additional scientific research published in 2018 also suggests a correlation.
