= Claude Vandersleyen =

Belgian Egyptologist (1927–2021)

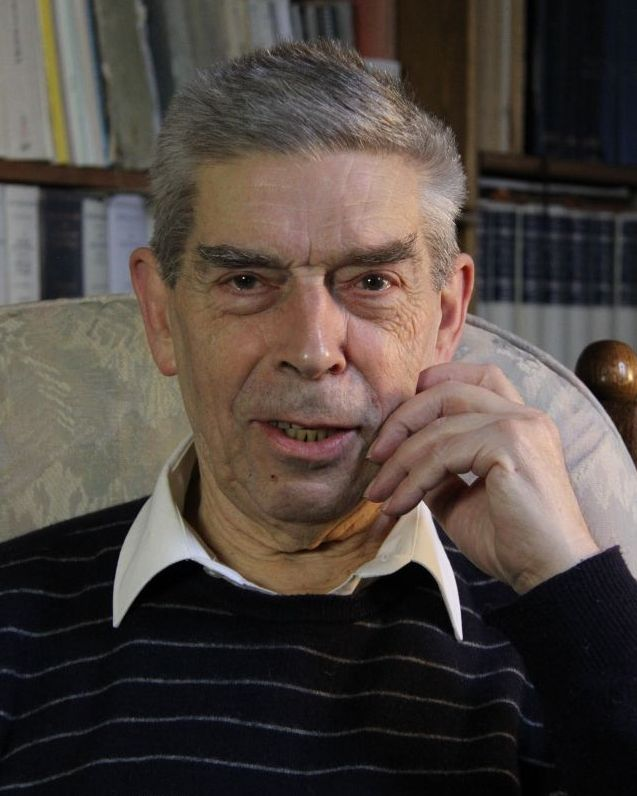
- Born: 26 September 1927; Brussels, Belgium
- Died: 7 December 2021 (aged 94); Braine-l'Alleud, Belgium
- Occupation: Egyptologist

Claude Vandersleyen (26 September 1927 – 7 December 2021) was a Belgian Egyptologist.

== Biography ==
Vandersleyen was born in Brussels, but soon his family moved to Waterloo where he grew up. After his secondary studies at the Collège Cardinal Mercier, Vandersleyen studied at the Facultés universitaires Saint-Louis from 1945 on and later at the Université libre de Bruxelles, where he earned a degree in Egyptology in 1950. He worked in the field of Egyptian art and the Egyptian language at the Université catholique de Louvain where he became full professor in 1979. He assisted in the restoration of the Tempest Stele, discovered by French archeologist from 1947 to 1951.

Vandersleyen died in Braine-l'Alleud on 7 December 2021, at the age of 94.

== Publications ==
- Chronologie des préfets d'Égypte de 284 à 395 (1962)
- Les guerres d'Amosis, fondateur de la XVIIIe dynastie (1971)
- "Des obstacles que constituent les cataractes du Nil" (1971)
- Das Alte Ägypten (1975)
- L'Égypte et la vallée du Nil, vol. II : De la fin de l'Ancien Empire à la fin du Nouvel Empire (1995)
- La guerre de Ramsès II contre les Hittites. Der Hettiterkrieg Ramses'II. Réédition du texte allemand (Vienne, 1939) et traduction française de Claude Vandersleyen (1996)
- Ouadj Our. Un autre aspect de la vallée du Nil (1999)
- "Le relief d’Amenhotep Ier au Louvre B 58 = E 11278" (2004)
- Iahmès Sapaïr fils de Séqénenré (XVIIe dynastie) (2005)
- "Où est mort le grand Pompée, l’adversaire malheureux de Jules César ?" (2006)
- Le delta et la vallée du Nil. Le sens de ouadj our (wȝd wr) (2008)
- Écrits sur l'art égyptien. Textes choisis, réunis et édités par Nadine Cherpion et A.-L. Oosthoek (2012)
- Le Rapport d’Ounamon (vers 1065 avant Jésus-Christ) : Analyse d’une mission manquée (2013)

== Secondary literature ==
- Obsomer, Claude (2021). "L'Égyptologie à l'Université de Louvain (1891-2019)" [Egyptology at the University of Louvain (1891-2019)]. In: Courtois, Luc (ed.). Les études orientales à l'Université de Louvain depuis 1834. Hommes et réalisations. Brussels: Éditions Safran, ISBN 978-2-87457-124-4, pp. 159-174, on Vandersleyen esp. pp. 168-171.
