= Galatas Palace =

Archaeological site in Greece

Galatas
- 35.1746°N 25.2457°E
- Type: Minoan town and "palace"
- Cultures: Minoan, Mycenaean
- Location: Heraklion, Crete, Greece

Site notes
- Archaeologists: George Rethemiotakis
- Public access: Yes

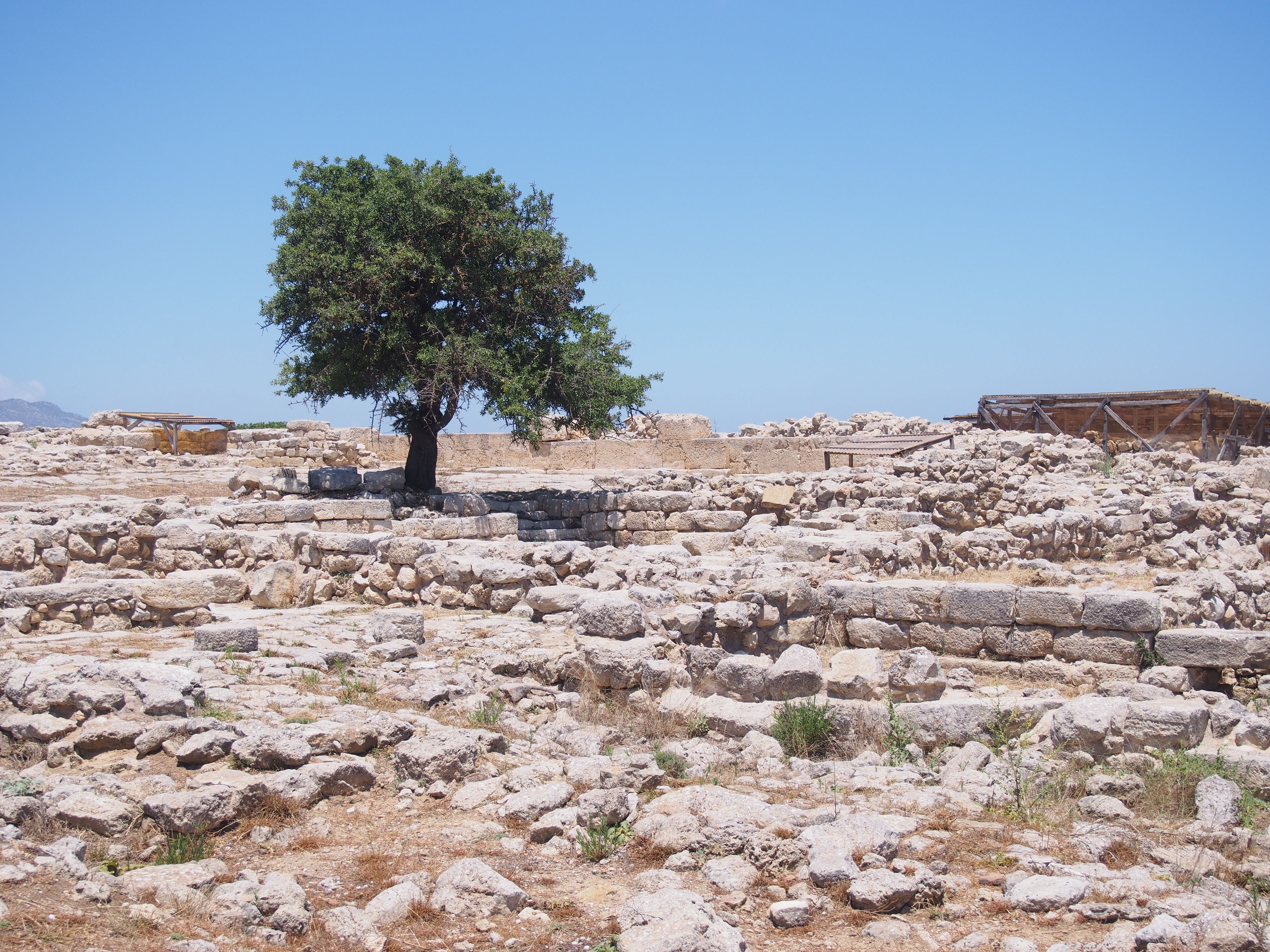
The archaeological site of Galatas

The Galatas Palace is a Minoan archaeological site in Heraklion, Crete, Greece about 30 kilometers southeast of the city of Heraklion discovered in the early 1990s. Built on an older Protopalatial settlement dating to the MM IB (c. 1925–1875 BC) period, a Minoan palace was constructed in the early Neopalatial Period, during the Early MM IIIA period (c. 1750 BC). The palatial center was destroyed by a conflagration at the end of the MM IIIA period.

The east wing is the best-preserved part of the structure, while the West and South wings were found to be extensively damaged. Excavations have not been completed in the area of the North wing of the building. The archaeological site is considered to be unique because it is the only such Minoan center to have been built and inhabited during one period.

== Archaeology ==
Minoan chronology
Timespan	Period	
3100–2650 BC	EM I	Prepalatial
2650–2200 BC	EM II	Prepalatial
2200–2100 BC	EM III	Prepalatial
2100–1925 BC	MM IA	Prepalatial
1925–1875 BC	MM IB	Protopalatial
1875–1750 BC	MM II	Protopalatial
1750–1700 BC	MM III	Neopalatial
1700–1625 BC	LM IA	Neopalatial
1625–1470 BC	LM IB	Neopalatial
1470–1420 BC	LM II	Postpalatial
1420–1330 BC	LM IIIA	Postpalatial
1330–1200 BC	LM IIIB	Postpalatial
1200–1075 BC	LM IIIC	Postpalatial

The site has been covered by two archaeological surveys. The first in the 1980s led by Nikos Panagiotakis, covered a very wide area (about 800 square kilometers) using an interview based system common at that time. The second between 2005 and 2007, led by L. Vance Watrous, was more narrowly focused (79 square kilometers) and used a field walking approach.

Galatas was discovered in 1992 when illegal excavations revealed the existence of several buildings associated with the Minoans. The site, located at Galatas Kephala, some 30 km south of Heraklion, and near the modern village of Galatas, was excavated under the guidance of archaeologist Dr. George Rethemiotakis. By 1997, he announced that a new Minoan palace had been discovered.

Excavation of the 4000 square meter palace has unearthed a large, paved central courtyard oriented north and south, that measured 16 meters by 32 meters. This is a typical feature of other Crete palatial sites (i. e., Knossos, Phaistos, Malia, and Zakros). They found remnants of a four-wing building that once surrounded the central court, also reminiscent of other Minoan palatial sites. Another unique feature of this Minoan center was a huge hearth measuring 3 meters by 1.5 meters, the first discovered on Crete. Two other hearths intended for feasting were also discovered, along with numerous Minoan ceramic finds, indicating large feasting events.

Work has also occurred on the settlement area associated with the palace. In 2007 a single-room shrine with goddess figure was found in Building 6, a large mansion southwest of the palace. The building had two occupation layers dated MM IIIA and LM 1A-B and included a Lustral basin. Remains of the earlier Protopalatial settlement, destroyed in the area of the Neopalatial palace, cover a sizable area outside of that palace.

== History ==
The site was occupied beginning in the Early Minoan I (EM I) (c. 3100–2650 BC) period based on pottery traces. In the Protopalatial MM IB (c. 1925–1875 BC) period a settlement arose in the northern area. At the beginning of the Neopalatial Early MM IIIA period (c. 1750 BC) a palace was constructed after leveling the MM IB buildings in that area. The Protopalatial remains were used as fill. By the end of the Late Minoan IB the palace had been abandoned and then destroyed by conflagration though occupation continued in the associated settlement. This occupation continued until the LM III A2-B period.

== See also ==
- Minoan pottery
- Minoan chronology
- Minoan art
- Minoan religion
- Minoan eruption
