= Radiocarbon dating considerations =

Radiocarbon dating is a method used to determine the age of organic materials by measuring the decay of carbon-14 (^{14}C), a radioactive isotope of carbon. Developed in the late 1940s, the technique has been widely used in archaeology, geology, and environmental science to date materials up to 50,000 years old.

The method relies on the carbon exchange reservoir, which includes the atmosphere, oceans, and biosphere. However, the ^{14}C/^{12}C ratio in this reservoir is not constant over time or across different environments, which can introduce errors in radiocarbon dating calculations. Scientists have identified four main sources of error:

- Variations in the ^{14}C/^{12}C ratio in the atmosphere due to factors such as changes in Earth's magnetic field, solar activity, and human influences like fossil fuel burning.
- Isotope fractionation, where different carbon isotopes are absorbed at different rates by plants and animals.
- Reservoir effects, where certain environments (e.g., deep ocean water, freshwater sources) contain different ^{14}C concentrations, affecting the apparent age of samples.
- Contamination, where external sources of carbon (such as modern pollutants or ancient carbon from fossil fuels) alter a sample’s true radiocarbon signature.

== Atmospheric variation ==
In the early years of using the technique, it was understood that it depended on the atmospheric ^{14}C/^{12}C ratio having remained the same over the preceding few thousand years. To verify the accuracy of the method, several artifacts that were datable by other techniques were tested; the results of the testing were in reasonable agreement with the true ages of the objects. However, in 1958, Hessel de Vries was able to demonstrate that the ^{14}C/^{12}C ratio had changed over time by testing wood samples of known ages and showing there was a significant deviation from the expected ratio. This discrepancy, often called the de Vries effect, was resolved by the study of tree rings. Comparison of overlapping series of tree rings allowed the construction of a continuous sequence of tree-ring data that spanned 8,000 years. (Since that time the tree-ring data series has been extended to 13,900 years.) Carbon-dating the wood from the tree rings themselves provided the check needed on the atmospheric ^{14}C/^{12}C ratio: with a sample of known date, and a measurement of the value of N (the number of atoms of ^{14}C remaining in the sample), the carbon-dating equation allows the calculation of N_{0} – the number of atoms of ^{14}C in the sample at the time the tree ring was formed – and hence the ^{14}C/^{12}C ratio in the atmosphere at that time. Armed with the results of carbon-dating the tree rings, it became possible to construct calibration curves designed to correct the errors caused by the variation over time in the ^{14}C/^{12}C ratio. These curves are described in more detail below.

There are three main reasons for these variations in the historical ^{14}C/^{12}C ratio: fluctuations in the rate at which ^{14}C is created, changes caused by glaciation, and changes caused by human activity.

=== Variations in ^{14}C production ===
Two different trends can be seen in the tree ring series. First, there is a long-term oscillation with a period of about 9,000 years, which causes radiocarbon dates to be older than true dates for the last 2,000 years and too young before that. The known fluctuations in the strength of the Earth's magnetic field match up quite well with this oscillation: cosmic rays are deflected by magnetic fields, so when there is a weaker magnetic field, more ^{14}C is produced, leading to a younger apparent age for samples from those periods. Conversely, a stronger magnetic field leads to lower ^{14}C production and an older apparent age. A secondary oscillation is thought to be caused by variations in sunspot activity, which has two separate periods: a longer-term, 200-year oscillation, and a shorter 11-year cycle. Sunspots cause changes in the solar system's magnetic field and corresponding changes to the cosmic ray flux, and hence to the production of ^{14}C.

There are two kinds of geophysical event which can affect ^{14}C production: geomagnetic reversals and polarity excursions. In a geomagnetic reversal, the Earth's geomagnetic field weakens and stays weak for thousands of years during the transition to the opposite magnetic polarity and then regains strength as the reversal completes. A polarity excursion, which can be either global or local, is a shorter-lived version of a geomagnetic reversal. A local excursion would not significantly affect ^{14}C production. During either a geomagnetic reversal or a global polarity excursion, ^{14}C production increases during the period when the geomagnetic field is weak. It is fairly certain, though, that in the last 50,000 years there have been no geomagnetic reversals or global polarity excursions.

Since the Earth's magnetic field varies with latitude, the rate of ^{14}C production changes with latitude, too, but atmospheric mixing is rapid enough that these variations amount to less than 0.5% of the global concentration. This is close to the limit of detectability in most years, but the effect can be clearly seen in tree rings from years such as 1963, when ^{14}C from nuclear testing rose sharply through the year. The latitudinal variation in ^{14}C was much larger than normal that year, and tree rings from different latitudes show corresponding variations in their ^{14}C content.

^{14}C can also be produced at ground level, primarily by cosmic rays that penetrate the atmosphere as far as the earth's surface, but also by spontaneous fission of naturally occurring uranium. These sources of neutrons only produce ^{14}C at a rate of 1 × 10^{−4} atoms per gram per second, which is not enough to have a significant effect on dating. At higher altitudes, the neutron flux can be substantially higher, (Note: Even at an altitude of 3 km, the neutron flux is only 3% of the value in the stratosphere where most ^{14}C is created; at sea level the value is less than 0.5% of the value in the stratosphere.) and in addition, trees at higher altitude are more likely to be struck by lightning, which produces neutrons. However, experiments in which wood samples have been irradiated with neutrons indicate that the effect on ^{14}C content is minor, though for very old trees (such as some bristlecone pines) that grow at altitude some effect can be seen.

=== Effect of climatic cycles ===
Because the solubility of CO_{2} in water increases with lower temperatures, glacial periods would have led to the faster absorption of atmospheric CO_{2} by the oceans. In addition, any carbon stored in the glaciers would be depleted in ^{14}C over the life of the glacier; when the glacier melted as the climate warmed, the depleted carbon would be released, reducing the global ^{14}C/^{12}C ratio. The changes in climate would also cause changes in the biosphere, with warmer periods leading to more plant and animal life. The effect of these factors on radiocarbon dating is not known.

=== Effects of human activity ===
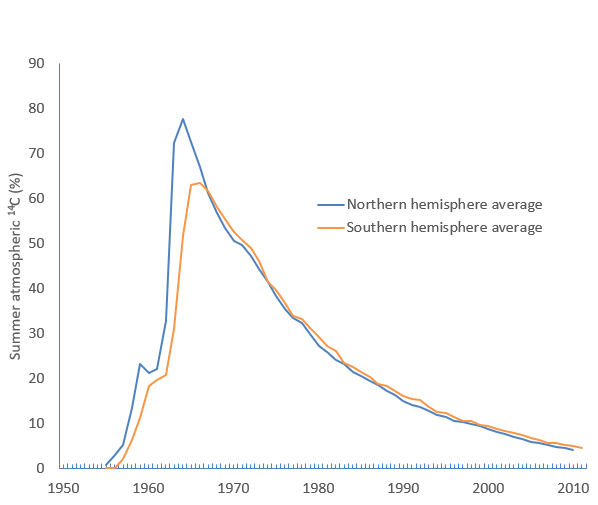
caption = Atmospheric ^{14}C for the northern and southern hemispheres, showing percentage excess above pre-bomb levels. The Partial Test Ban Treaty went into effect on 10 October 1963.

Coal and oil began to be burned in large quantities during the 1800s. Both coal and oil are sufficiently old that they contain little detectable ^{14}C and, as a result, the CO_{2} released substantially diluted the atmospheric ^{14}C/^{12}C ratio. Dating an object from the early 20th century hence gives an apparent date older than the true date. For the same reason, ^{14}C concentrations in the neighborhood of large cities are lower than the atmospheric average. This fossil fuel effect (also known as the Suess effect, after Hans Suess, who first reported it in 1955) would only amount to a reduction of 0.2% in ^{14}C activity if the additional carbon from fossil fuels were distributed throughout the carbon exchange reservoir, but because of the long delay in mixing with the deep ocean, the actual effect is a 3% reduction.

A much larger effect comes from above-ground nuclear testing, which released large numbers of neutrons and created ^{14}C. From about 1950 until 1963, when atmospheric nuclear testing was banned, it is estimated that several tonnes of ^{14}C were created. If all this extra ^{14}C had immediately been spread across the entire carbon exchange reservoir, it would have led to an increase in the ^{14}C/^{12}C ratio of only a few percent, but the immediate effect was to almost double the amount of ^{14}C in the atmosphere, with the peak level occurring in about 1965. The level has since dropped, as the "bomb carbon" (as it is sometimes called) percolates into the rest of the reservoir.

== Isotopic fractionation ==
Photosynthesis is the primary process by which carbon moves from the atmosphere into living things. Two different photosynthetic processes exist: the C3 pathway and the C4 pathway. About 90% of all plant life uses the C3 process; the remaining plants either use C4 or are CAM plants, which can use either C3 or C4 depending on the environmental conditions. Both the C3 and C4 photosynthesis pathways show a preference for lighter carbon, with ^{12}C being absorbed slightly more easily than ^{13}C, which in turn is more easily absorbed than ^{14}C. The differential uptake of the three carbon isotopes leads to ^{13}C/^{12}C and ^{14}C/^{12}C ratios in plants that differ from the ratios in the atmosphere. This effect is known as isotopic fractionation.

To determine the degree of fractionation that takes place in a given plant, the amounts of both ^{12}C and ^{13}C are measured, and the resulting ^{13}C/^{12}C ratio is then compared to a standard ratio known as PDB. (The ^{13}C/^{12}C ratio is used because it is much easier to measure than the ^{14}C/^{12}C ratio, and the ^{14}C/^{12}C ratio can be easily derived from it.) The resulting value, known as δ^{13}C, is calculated as follows:

$\ce{\delta ^{13}C} = \left( {\frac{\left( \frac\ce{^{13}C}\ce{^{12}C} \right)_\ce{sample}}{\left( \frac\ce{^{13}C}\ce{^{12}C} \right)_\ce{PDB}}} -1 \right) \times 1000$ ‰

where the ‰ (permil) sign indicates parts per thousand. Because the PDB standard contains an unusually high proportion of ^{13}C, (Note: The PDB value is 11.1‰.) most measured δ^{13}C values are negative. Values for C3 plants typically range from −30‰ to −22‰, with an average of −27‰; for C4 plants the range is −15‰ to −9‰, and the average is −13‰. Atmospheric CO_{2} has a δ^{13}C of −8‰.

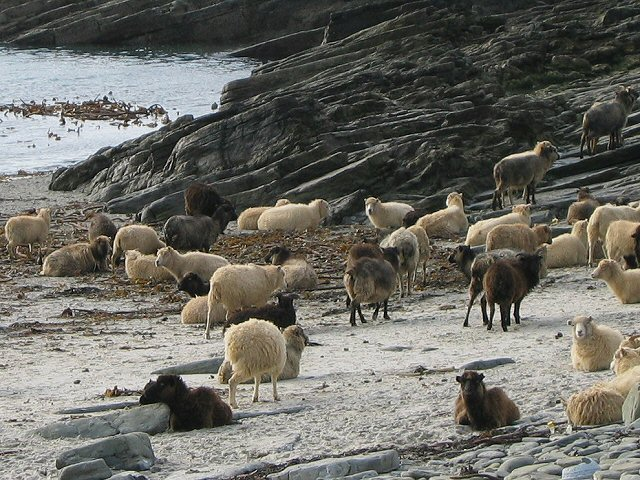
Sheep on the beach in North Ronaldsay. In the winter, these sheep eat seaweed, which has a higher δ^{13}C content than grass; samples from these sheep have a δ^{13}C value of about −13%, which is much higher than for sheep that feed on grasses.

For marine organisms, the details of the photosynthesis reactions are less well understood. Measured δ^{13}C values for marine plankton range from −31‰ to −10‰; most lie between −22‰ and −17‰. The δ^{13}C values for marine photosynthetic organisms also depend on temperature. At higher temperatures, CO_{2} has poor solubility in water, which means there is less CO_{2} available for the photosynthetic reactions. Under these conditions, fractionation is reduced, and at temperatures above 14 °C the δ^{13}C values are correspondingly higher, reaching −13‰. At lower temperatures, CO_{2} becomes more soluble and hence more available to the marine organisms; fractionation increases and δ^{13}C values can be as low as −32‰.

The δ^{13}C value for animals depends on their diet. An animal that eats food with high δ^{13}C values will have a higher δ^{13}C than one that eats food with lower δ^{13}C values. The animal's own biochemical processes can also affect the results: for example, both bone minerals and bone collagen typically have a higher concentration of ^{13}C than is found in the animal's diet, though for different biochemical reasons. The enrichment of bone ^{13}C also implies that excreted material is depleted in ^{13}C relative to the diet.

Since ^{13}C makes up about 1% of the carbon in a sample, the ^{13}C/^{12}C ratio can be accurately measured by mass spectrometry. Typical values of δ^{13}C have been found by experiment for many plants, as well as for different parts of animals such as bone collagen, but when dating a given sample it is better to determine the δ^{13}C value for that sample directly than to rely on the published values. The depletion of ^{13}C relative to ^{12}C is proportional to the difference in the atomic masses of the two isotopes, so once the δ^{13}C value is known, the depletion for ^{14}C can be calculated: it will be twice the depletion of ^{13}C.

The carbon exchange between atmospheric CO_{2} and carbonate at the ocean surface is also subject to fractionation, with ^{14}C in the atmosphere more likely than ^{12}C to dissolve in the ocean. The result is an overall increase in the ^{14}C/^{12}C ratio in the ocean of 1.5%, relative to the ^{14}C/^{12}C ratio in the atmosphere. This increase in ^{14}C concentration almost exactly cancels out the decrease caused by the upwelling of water (containing old, and hence ^{14}C depleted, carbon) from the deep ocean, so that direct measurements of ^{14}C radiation are similar to measurements for the rest of the biosphere. Correcting for isotopic fractionation, as is done for all radiocarbon dates to allow comparison between results from different parts of the biosphere, gives an apparent age of about 400 years for ocean surface water.

== Reservoir effects ==
Libby's original exchange reservoir hypothesis assumed that the ^{14}C/^{12}C ratio in the exchange reservoir is constant all over the world, but it has since been discovered that there are several causes of variation in the ratio across the reservoir.

=== Marine effect ===
The CO_{2} in the atmosphere transfers to the ocean by dissolving in the surface water as carbonate and bicarbonate ions; at the same time the carbonate ions in the water are returning to the air as CO_{2}. This exchange process brings^{14}C from the atmosphere into the surface waters of the ocean, but the ^{14}C thus introduced takes a long time to percolate through the entire volume of the ocean. The deepest parts of the ocean mix very slowly with the surface waters, and the mixing is known to be uneven. The main mechanism that brings deep water to the surface is upwelling. Upwelling is more common in regions closer to the equator; it is also influenced by other factors such as the topography of the local ocean bottom and coastlines, the climate, and wind patterns. Overall, the mixing of deep and surface waters takes far longer than the mixing of atmospheric CO_{2} with the surface waters, and as a result water from some deep ocean areas has an apparent radiocarbon age of several thousand years. Upwelling mixes this "old" water with the surface water, giving the surface water an apparent age of about several hundred years (after correcting for fractionation). This effect is not uniform—the average effect is about 440 years, but there are local deviations of several hundred years for areas that are geographically close to each other. The effect also applies to marine organisms such as shells, and marine mammals such as whales and seals, which have radiocarbon ages that appear to be hundreds of years old. These marine reservoir effects vary over time as well as geographically; for example, there is evidence that during the Younger Dryas, a period of cold climatic conditions about 12,000 years ago, the apparent difference between the age of surface water and the contemporary atmosphere increased from between 400 and 600 years to about 900 years until the climate warmed again.

=== Hard water effect ===
If the carbon in freshwater is partly acquired from aged carbon, such as rocks, then the result will be a reduction in the ^{14}C/^{12}C ratio in the water. For example, rivers that pass over limestone, which is mostly composed of calcium carbonate, will acquire carbonate ions. Similarly, groundwater can contain carbon derived from the rocks through which it has passed. These rocks are usually so old that they no longer contain any measurable ^{14}C, so this carbon lowers the ^{14}C/^{12}C ratio of the water it enters, which can lead to apparent ages of thousands of years for both the affected water and the plants and freshwater organisms that live in it. This is known as the hard water effect, because it is often associated with calcium ions, which are characteristic of hard water; however, there can be other sources of carbon that have the same effect, such as humus. The effect is not necessarily confined to freshwater species—at a river mouth, the outflow may affect marine organisms. It can also affect terrestrial snails that feed in areas where there is a high chalk content, though no measurable effect has been found for land plants in soil with a high carbonate content—it appears that almost all the carbon for these plants is derived from photosynthesis and not from the soil.

It is not possible to deduce the effect by determining the hardness of the water: the aged carbon is not necessarily immediately incorporated into the plants and animals that are affected, and the delay affects their apparent age. The effect is very variable and there is no general offset that can be applied; the usual way to determine the size of the effect is to measure the apparent age offset of a modern sample.

=== Volcanoes ===
Volcanic eruptions eject large amounts of carbon into the air. The carbon is of geological origin and has no detectable ^{14}C, so the ^{14}C/^{12}C ratio in the vicinity of the volcano is depressed relative to surrounding areas. Dormant volcanoes can also emit aged carbon. Plants that photosynthesize this carbon also have lower ^{14}C/^{12}C ratios: for example, plants on the Greek island of Santorini, near the volcano, have apparent ages of up to a thousand years. These effects are hard to predict—the town of Akrotiri, on Santorini, was destroyed in a volcanic eruption thousands of years ago, but radiocarbon dates for objects recovered from the ruins of the town show surprisingly close agreement with dates derived from other means. If the dates for Akrotiri are confirmed, it would indicate that the volcanic effect in this case was minimal.

=== Hemisphere effect ===
The northern and southern hemispheres have atmospheric circulation systems that are sufficiently independent of each other that there is a noticeable time lag in mixing between the two. The atmospheric ^{14}C/^{12}C ratio is lower in the southern hemisphere, with an apparent additional age of 30 years for radiocarbon results from the south as compared to the north. This is probably because the greater surface area of ocean in the southern hemisphere means that there is more carbon exchanged between the ocean and the atmosphere than in the north. Since the surface ocean is depleted in ^{14}C because of the marine effect, ^{14}C is removed from the southern atmosphere more quickly than in the north.

=== Island effect ===
It has been suggested that an "island effect" might exist, by analogy with the mechanism thought to explain the hemisphere effect: since islands are surrounded by water, the carbon exchange between the water and atmosphere might reduce the ^{14}C/^{12}C ratio on an island. Within a hemisphere, however, atmospheric mixing is apparently rapid enough that no such effect exists: two calibration curves assembled in Seattle and Belfast laboratories, with results from North American trees and Irish trees, respectively, are in close agreement, instead of the Irish samples appearing to be older, as would be the case if there were an island effect.

== Contamination ==
Any addition of carbon to a sample of a different age will cause the measured date to be inaccurate. Contamination with modern carbon causes a sample to appear to be younger than it really is: the effect is greater for older samples. If a sample that is in fact 17,000 years old is contaminated so that 1% of the sample is actually modern carbon, it will appear to be 600 years younger; for a sample that is 34,000 years old the same amount of contamination would cause an error of 4,000 years. Contamination with old carbon, with no remaining ^{14}C, causes an error in the other direction, which does not depend on age—a sample that has been contaminated with 1% old carbon will appear to be about 80 years older than it really is, regardless of the date of the sample.

Contamination can occur if the sample is brought into contact with or packed in materials that contain carbon. Cotton wool, cigarette ash, paper labels, cloth bags, and some conservation chemicals such as polyvinyl acetate can all be sources of modern carbon. Labels should be added to the outside of the container, not placed inside the bag or vial with the sample. Glass wool is acceptable as packing material instead of cotton wool. Samples should be packed in glass vials or Aluminium foil if possible. Polyethylene bags are also acceptable but some plastics, such as PVC, can contaminate the sample. Contamination can also occur before the sample is collected: humic acids or carbonate from the soil can leach into a sample, and for some sample types, such as shells, there is the possibility of carbon exchange between the sample and the environment, depleting the sample's ^{14}C content.
