= List of settlements in the Heraklion regional unit =

This is a list of settlements in the Heraklion regional unit, Crete, Greece:

- Achentrias
- Achlada
- Afrati
- Agia Varvara
- Agies Paraskies
- Agioi Deka
- Agios Kyrillos
- Agios Myronas
- Agios Syllas
- Agios Thomas
- Agios Vasileios, Archanes-Asterousia
- Agios Vasileios, Viannos
- Aidonochori
- Aitania
- Alagni
- Alithini
- Amariano
- Amiras
- Ampelouzos
- Ano Akria
- Ano Asites
- Ano Moulia
- Ano Viannos
- Anopoli
- Antiskari
- Apesokari
- Apostoloi
- Archanes
- Archangelos
- Arkalochori
- Arvi
- Asimi
- Askoi
- Astrakoi
- Astritsi
- Astyraki
- Avdou
- Avgeniki
- Charakas
- Charaki
- Charaso
- Chersonisos
- Chondros
- Choudetsi
- Choustouliana
- Dafnes
- Damania
- Damasta
- Demati
- Dionysi
- Douli
- Elaia
- Emparos
- Epano Vatheia
- Episkopi
- Ethia
- Evangelismos
- Faneromeni
- Fodele
- Galia
- Galifa
- Galipe
- Garipa
- Gazi
- Geraki
- Gergeri
- Gkagkales
- Gonies
- Gonies
- Gouves
- Grigoria
- Heraklion
- Ini
- Kainourgio Chorio
- Kalami
- Kalesia
- Kallithea
- Kalloni
- Kalo Chorio
- Kalyvia
- Kamares
- Kamari
- Kamariotis
- Kamilari
- Karavados
- Karouzana
- Kassanoi
- Kastamonitsa
- Kastelli, Faistos
- Kastelli, Heraklion
- Kastelliana
- Katalagari
- Kato Archanes Patsides
- Kato Asites
- Kato Symi
- Kato Vatheia
- Kato Viannos
- Katofygi
- Kefalovrysi
- Kera
- Keramoutsi
- Kerasia
- Keratokampos
- Klima
- Korfes
- Kounavoi
- Kouses
- Koxari
- Krasi
- Krevvatas
- Krousonas
- Kyparissos
- Lagoli
- Larani
- Lefkochori
- Ligortynos
- Liliano
- Limin Chersonisou
- Loures
- Loutraki
- Lyttos
- Magarikari
- Malia
- Marathos
- Martha
- Matala
- Mathia
- Megali Vrysi
- Meleses
- Mesochorio
- Metaxochori
- Miamou
- Milliarades
- Mitropoli
- Mochos
- Moires
- Moni
- Moroni
- Myrtia
- Nea Alikarnassos
- Nipiditos
- Nyvritos
- Panagia
- Panasos
- Panorama
- Paranymfoi
- Partira
- Patsideros
- Pefkos
- Pentamodi
- Peri
- Pervola
- Petrokefali
- Petrokefalo
- Peza
- Pigaidakia
- Pitsidia
- Platanos
- Plora
- Polythea
- Pompia
- Potamies
- Praitoria
- Prinias
- Profitis Ilias
- Psari Forada
- Pyrgou
- Rodia
- Roufas
- Sampas
- Sarchos
- Sgourokefali
- Siva
- Sivas
- Skalani
- Skinias
- Skourvoula
- Smari
- Sokaras
- Stavies
- Stavrakia
- Sternes
- Stoloi
- Sykologos
- Tefeli
- Thrapsano
- Tylisos
- Tympaki
- Vachos
- Vagionia
- Vasileies
- Vasilika Anogeia
- Vasiliki
- Venerato
- Voni
- Vorizia
- Voroi
- Voutes
- Xeniakos
- Zaros
- Zoforoi

== See also ==
- List of towns and villages in Greece
