= Panaro =

Panaro may refer to:

== Places ==
- Panaro (river), river in Italy
- Savignano sul Panaro, a municipality in Modena, Italy
- San Cesario sul Panaro, a municipality in Modena, Italy
- Marano sul Panaro, a municipality in Modena, Italy
- San Felice sul Panaro, a municipality in Modeno, Italy

== Other ==
- Panaro (surname)
- Battle of the Panaro, Battle on the banks of the Panaro river during the Neapolitan war in 1812
