= Middle Bronze Age migrations (ancient Near East) =

The Middle Bronze Age Migrations are postulated waves of migration during the Middle Bronze Age. This proposal was advanced in the mid-20th century by scholars such as James Mellaart, who argued for a connection between the spread of the Indo-European languages and archaeologically attested destructions and cultural changes around the 20th century BC. However, more recent research has disfavored the notion of Indo-European invasions, interpreting the evidence as favoring a more gradual process of assimilation.

== Theories ==
Various outdated theories have postulated waves of migration during the Middle Bronze Age in the Ancient Near East.

=== Mellaart (1958) ===
In The End of the Early Bronze Age in Anatolia and the Aegean (1958), Mellaart argued that the Hittites moved from their earliest known home in Kültepe into central Anatolia, conquering the Hattians and later adopting their culture and name. According to this theory, the Hittite migration displaced other peoples living in Anatolia, triggering an exodus from Northwestern Anatolia and creating a wave of refugees who invaded what is now southern Greece and destroyed the Early Helladic civilization.

According to Mellaart, archaeological evidence shows that the cities of Erzerum, Sivas, Pulur Huyuk near Baiburt, Kultepe near Hafik, and Maltepe near Sivas were destroyed during the Middle Bronze Age. From there in the hill country between Halys the destruction layers from this time tell the same story. Karaoglan, Bitik, Polatli and Gordion were burnt, as well as Etiyokusu and Cerkes. Further west near the Dardanelles the two large mounds of Korpruoren and Tavsanli, west of Kutahya, show the same signs of destruction. The destruction even crossed into Europe in what is now Bulgaria, with archaeological evidence showing that the Yunacite, Salcutza, and Esero centers had a sudden mass desertion during this time.

From the Dardanelles, the refugee invaders moved into mainland Greece, and the Peloponnese saw burnt and abandoned cities on par with the much later Dorian invasion which destroyed the Mycenaean civilization. At this time, 1900 BC, destruction layers can be found at sites of Southern Greece like Orchomenos, Eutresis, Hagios Kosmas, Raphina, Apesokari, Korakou, Zygouries, Tiryns, Asine, Malthi and Asea. Many other sites are deserted, e.g. Yiriza, Synoro, Ayios Gerasimos, Kophovouni, Makrovouni, Palaiopyrgos, etc. This destruction across Greece also coincided with the arrival of a new culture that had no connection with the Early Helladic civilization, who were the original inhabitants. Northern Greece escaped destruction, as well as southern Anatolia, which during this time showed no disturbances.

=== Dietrich (1974) and Drews (1994) ===
Drews and Dietrich connect these alleged "mass migrations" with the coming of the Greeks, moving from former settlements into the southern and central Balkans, displacing the former pre-Greek inhabitants of Greece.

=== Recent theories ===
Yet, more recent theories and evidence suggest that a Proto-Indo-Hittite language dates back to the fourth millennium BCE, prior to the Bronze Age.

While earlier work had taken Gray Minyan ware as a hallmark of the migrants' culture, more recent work has shown that it in fact developed as part of a smooth transition from Early to Middle Bronze Age culture. For instance, excavations at Lerna showed that Minyan ware had a predecessor in the preceding Early Helladic III Tiryns culture.

== Genetic research ==
Lazaridis et al. (2017) researched the genetical origins of the Greeks. They found that the ancient Mycenaean and Minoan populations were highly similar, but not identical, and that "the Minoans and Mycenaeans descended mainly from early Neolithic farmers, likely migrating thousands of years prior to the Bronze Age from Anatolia, in what is today modern Turkey." (Note: Phys.org, Ancient DNA analysis reveals Minoan and Mycenaean origins) According to Lazaridis, "Minoans, Mycenaeans, and modern Greeks also had some ancestry related to the ancient people of the Caucasus, Armenia, and Iran. This finding suggests that some migration occurred in the Aegean and southwestern Anatolia from further east after the time of the earliest farmers." Lazaridis et al. (2017) further state that "the Mycenaeans differed from Minoans in deriving additional ancestry from an ultimate source related to the hunter–gatherers of Eastern Europe and Siberia, introduced via a proximal source related to the inhabitants of either the Eurasian steppe or Armenia."

== See also ==
- Bronze Age Greece
- Bronze Age Anatolia

== Sources ==
Printed sources

- Caskey, John L. (July–September 1960). "The Early Helladic Period in the Argolid". Hesperia. 29 (3): 285–303. JSTOR 147199.
- Dietrich, Bernard Clive (1974). The Origins of Greek Religion. Berlin: Walter de Gruyter. ISBN 978-3-11-003982-5.
- Drews, Robert (1994). The Coming of the Greeks: Indo-European Conquests in the Aegean and the Near East. Princeton, NJ: Princeton University Press. ISBN 978-0-691-02951-1.
- Edwards, Iorwerth Eiddon Stephen; Gadd, C.J.; Hammond, N.G.L. (1971). The Cambridge Ancient History (Volume II, Part I): The Early History of the Middle East. Cambridge and New York: Cambridge University Press. ISBN 978-0-52-107791-0.
- French, D.M. (1973). "Migrations and 'Minyan' pottery in western Anatolia and the Aegean". In Crossland, R.A.; Birchall, Ann (eds.). Bronze Age Migrations in the Aegean. Park Ridge, NJ: Noyes Press. pp. 51–57.
- Lazaridis, Iosif; Mittnik, Alissa; Patterson, Nick; Mallick, Subhashis; et al. (2017). "Genetic origins of the Minoans and Mycenaeans". Nature. 548 (7666): 214–218. Bibcode:2017Natur.548..214L. doi:10.1038/nature23310. PMC 5565772. PMID 28783727. "Supplementary Information. Genetic origins of the Minoans and Mycenaeans" (PDF)..
- Mellaart, James (January 1958). "The End of the Early Bronze Age in Anatolia and the Aegean". American Journal of Archaeology. 62 (1): 9–33. doi:10.2307/500459. JSTOR 500459. S2CID 193089026.
- Pullen, Daniel (2008). "The Early Bronze Age in Greece". In Shelmerdine, Cynthia W. (ed.). The Cambridge Companion to the Aegean Bronze Age. Cambridge and New York: Cambridge University Press. pp. 19–46. ISBN 978-0-521-81444-7.
- Steadman, Sharon R.; McMahon, Gregory (2011). The Oxford Handbook of Ancient Anatolia: 10,000-323 BCE. Oxford and New York: Oxford University Press. ISBN 978-0-19-537614-2.

Web-sources
