= Loures, Heraklion =

Loures Λούρες
- Community
- Location within Greece
- Coordinates: 35°03′N 25°04′E
- Country: Greece
- Administrative region: Crete
- Regional unit: Heraklion
- Municipality: Gortyna
- Municipal unit: Kofinas
- Elevation: 270 m (890 ft)

Population (2021)
  - Community: 208
- Time zone: UTC+2 (EET)
  - Summer (DST): UTC+3 (EEST)

Loures (Greek: Λούρες) is a village on the island of Crete in Greece, located in the municipality of Gortyn (until 2011 in the municipality of Kofinas) of Heraklion regional unit, at the northern edge of the Messara Plain. It is 53.8 kilometres (33.4 mi) by road south of Heraklion city.

The people of Loures are involved in the cultivation of olive trees and vineyards and the raising of livestock. The indigenous Messara horse is extensively bred there.

== History ==
The settlement appears in the Venetian censuses of the 16th century under the name Lures; 109 inhabitants are recorded in Pietro Castrofilaca's 1583 census.
