= Fournofarago =

Village in Crete, Greece

Coordinates: 34.992°N 25.026°E

Fournofarago (Greek: Φουρνοφάραγγο) is a small village located in southern Crete, Greece.

== History ==
The first families arrived to the village from an old village named Katalimata. That old village is no longer standing, yet some ruins can be found in the mountain near Fournofarago.

== Features ==
The village is known for its celebratory feast of Aghios Georgios held annually on April 23 and a chapel fountain with reported healing powers. Many people journey to the fountain in order to return to their homes with the clear-tasting water. The chapel itself grants a good view of the whole region.

== Geography ==
Located in the municipal unit of Kofinas, it is about 7 miles (11 km) from Asimi, it has been in existence since at least 1842.

Nearby villages are Stavies, Vagionia and Loukia.

The village lies on the foothills of a mountain, which is home of various animals (hares and weasels, to name a few ) and also provides food for the various flocks of sheep, goats and cows owned by the villagers.
