= Paximadi (Gouves) =

Greek islet in the Aegean Sea

Native name: Παξιμάδι
- Location within Greece

Geography
- Coordinates: 35.435°N 25.275°E
- Archipelago: Cretan Islands

Administration
- Greece
- Region: Crete
- Regional unit: Heraklion

Paximadi (Greek: Παξιμάδι) is a small islet off the coast of the Greek island of Crete in the Aegean Sea. The islet is administered from Gouves in Heraklion regional unit.
