= Gouves =

Gouves may refer to:

- Gouves, Pas-de-Calais, commune in the Pas-de-Calais department in the Hauts-de-France region of France.
- Gouves, Greece, village and former municipality in the Heraklion regional unit, Crete, Greece
