= Kounaviano Gorge =

Gorge

Coordinates: 35°13′57.8158″N 25°12′10.7129″E

Kounaviano Gorge (Greek: Κουναβιανό Φαράγγι) is a gorge near Heraklion, Crete.

== Etymology ==
The gorge gets its name from the nearby village of Kounavi (el).

== Location ==
The gorge starts near the village of Peza and can be entered west of the village of Myrtia. It runs for about 8 kilometres (5.0 mi) towards the north and parallel to Astrakiano gorge. A small stream, which is a tributary of the Karteros river, flows through the gorge. The two gorges meet at Kaki Rachi near the village of Skalani (el), forming the Karteros gorge. Kounaviano gorge is part of the Juktas eco-park.

== Features ==
Kounaviano gorge has lush vegetation that includes plane trees, willows, kermes oaks and fig trees. A well-signed path along the gorge is easy to cross and takes about two hours. Along this path there are several abandoned watermills and charcoal piles.

== See also ==
- Astrakiano Gorge
