= Rhittenia =

Town in Ancient Crete

Coordinates: 35°00′34″N 24°57′10″E

Rhittenia or Rhizenia was a town of ancient Crete.

Its site is tentatively located near modern Kato Riza, Apesokari.
