= Kapetaniana =

Kapetaniana Καπετανιανά
- Settlement
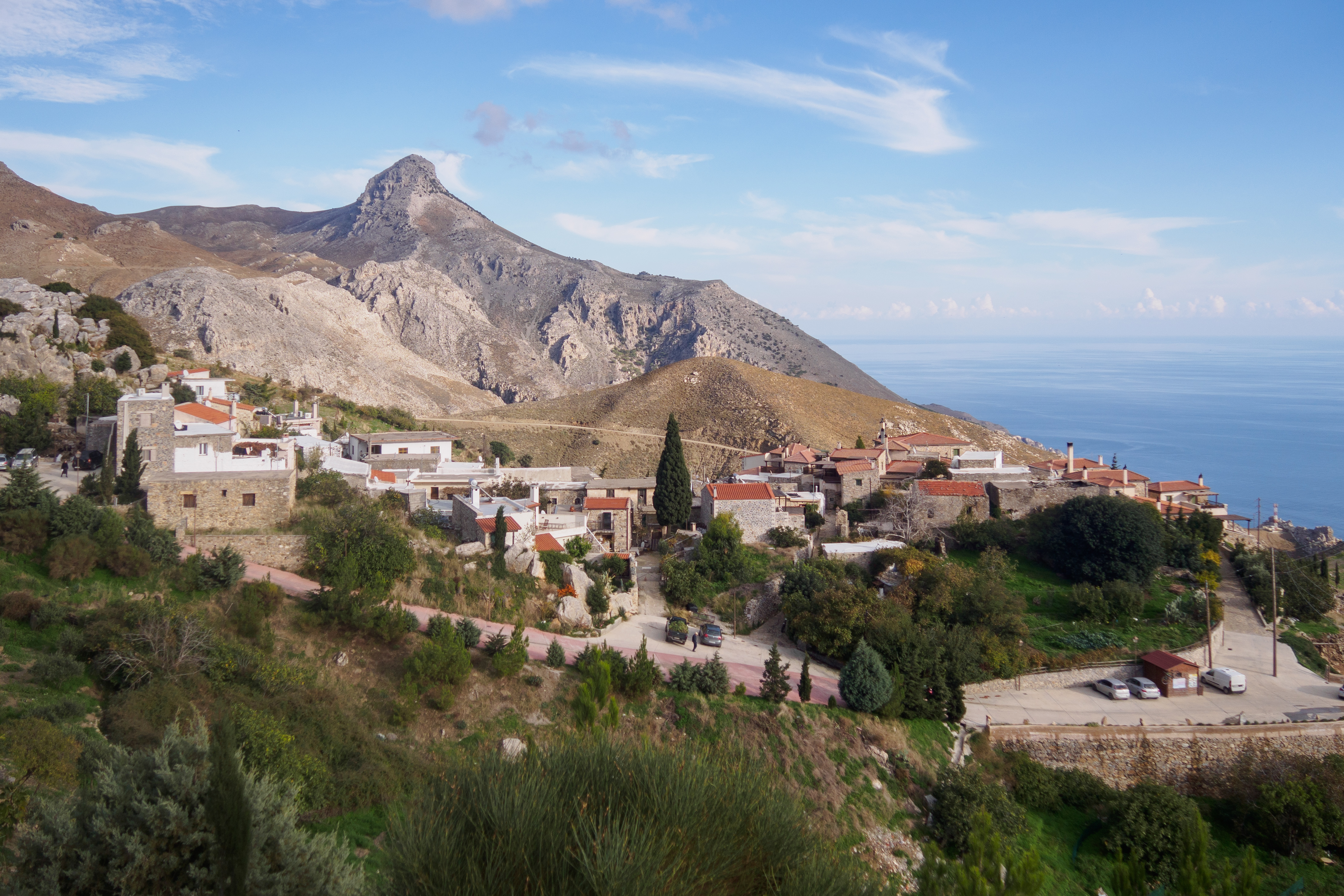
- View of Kapetaniana

- Location within Greece
- Coordinates: 34°57′48″N 25°02′34″E
- Country: Greece
- Administrative region: Crete
- Regional unit: Heraklion
- Municipality: Gortyn
- Municipal unit: Kofinas
- Community: Stavies

Population (2021)
  - Total: 49
- Time zone: UTC+2 (EET)
  - Summer (DST): UTC+3 (EEST)

Kapetaniana (Greek: Καπετανιανά) is a small village in the municipality of Gortyn on the island of Crete in Greece. The village has between 50 and 100 inhabitants and is built on the slopes of Asterousia Mountains at an altitude of 750m, with views of the Libyan Sea and the Messara Plain.

== History ==
Kapetaniana was founded around a monastery, approximately at the time of the Republic of Venice. The monastery's church, the Church of Panagia, was constructed around 1400. The monastery was abandoned during the Ottoman occupation of Crete.

The village was revived in 2007 and focuses its local economy on ecotourism.
