= Koxari =

Koxari Κόξαρη
- Community
- Location within Greece
- Coordinates: 35°17′N 25°19′E
- Country: Greece
- Administrative region: Crete
- Regional unit: Heraklion
- Municipality: Hersonissos
- Municipal unit: Gouves

Population (2021)
  - Community: 220
- Time zone: UTC+2 (EET)
  - Summer (DST): UTC+3 (EEST)

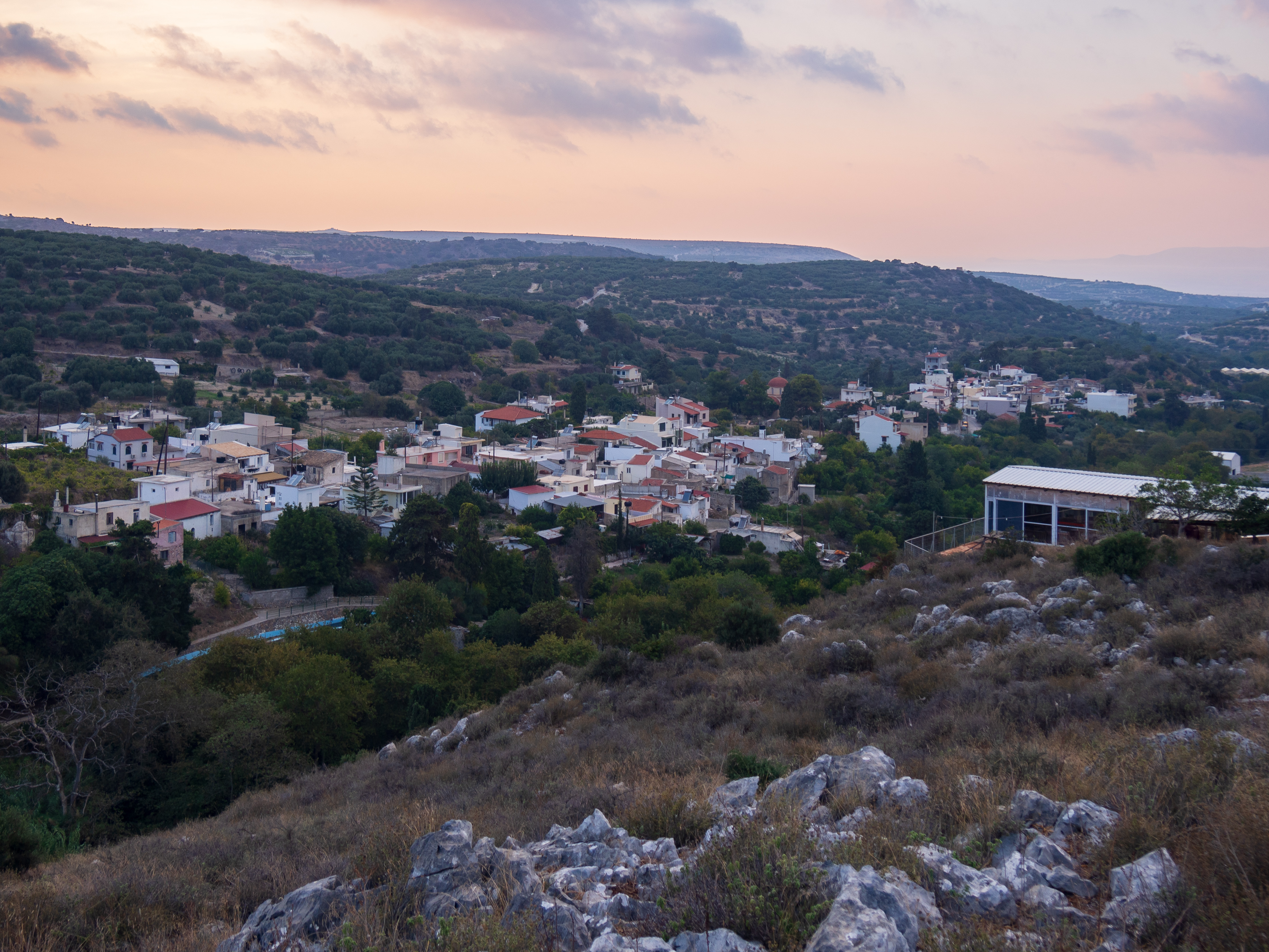
View of Koxari from the southeast

Koxari (Greek: Κόξαρη) is a village near Heraklion in Crete. It is in the municipal unit of Gouves. The village is at an altitude of 180 meters and is 23.3 km from Heraklion.

== Historical reports ==
The village is reported in the following documents:

- Provincial plain in 1577 from Francesco Barozzi, as "Coxari"
- The Castle guard in 1583
- The Royal in 1630
- Turkish census of 1671 as "Koksari", with 42 taxes
- In a document of 1378 from the files of the Dukes of Chandacas (Heraklion) is reported "Costi coiri" from Chania.

The village was a feudal property of the Grego family and a part of the village was given as a dowry to Helena Grego, who married the poet Marco Antonio Foskolo. Foskolo wrote the comedy "Furtunato" or "Fortounatos" in 1655 (see Greeklish).

Near Koxari is the "Keras Eleousas" monastery. Koxari belonged to the Latin Patriarchate.
