= Galipe =

Village in Crete, Greece

Coordinates: 35°16′43″N 25°16′02″E

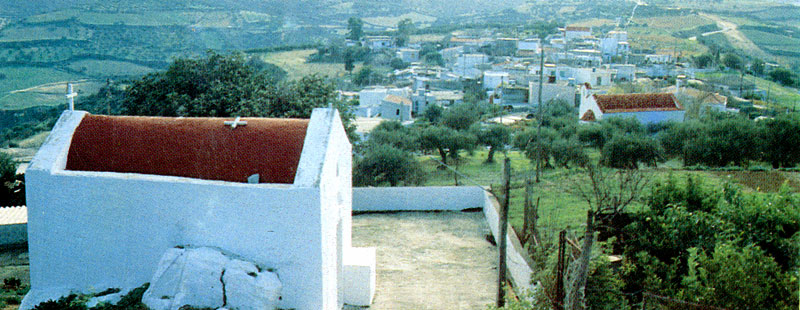
Panoramic view of Galipe.

Galipe (Greek: Γάλιπε, pronounced “Galipae”) is a village in the municipali unit of Episkopi's, Hersonissos municipality in the regional unit of Heraklion, Crete, Greece. It is situated at 280 m. altitude, 21 km away from Heraklion. The economy of the village is mainly based on agriculture. The main cultivations concern vines (focused on the production of raisins and secondarily for wine) and olives for olive oil production. The population of the village is 97 inhabitants, according to the census of 2011.

== History and statistics ==
The oldest mention of the village is found during the Venetian occupation, in the 1299 treaty between Venice and the leader of the rebels, Alexis Kalergis, as a protectorate of Jano Michael. However, the village should be much earlier. This is justified by its Arabic origin name, which is traced before the 2nd Byzantine period. It is also referred to a record of the 1368's Ducal Archive of Chantakas (Heraklion) as a protectorate of Petro Zampani, who passed it over to his son, Marinello.

Besides it is mentioned in 1577, in the province Pediada by Francesco Barozzi (Galipe), by "Kastrofilakas" in 1583, with 295 inhabitants and by Francesco Basilicata in 1630. In 1671's Turkish census is mentioned with 55 charatsa, and in 1834 Egyptian census of (as Ghálipi) with 15 Christian and 10 Muslim families. In 1881 census, it is referred in the municipality of Episkopi, with 123 Christian and 128 Muslim families. In 1900 it belongs to the same municipality, while in 1928 it is a municipality seat of a rural municipality of the same name and 193 residents. In 1928 it belongs to the community of Galifa with 224 residents. In 1940 it belongs to the community of Kenourgio Chorio with 238 residents. It will remain in Kenourgio Chorio's community until the implementation of "Kapodistrias’ Plan"(Law 2539/1997). After that, it has been a part of Episkopi’s Municipality. In the 2001 census, it is listed as having 150 residents.

== Monuments ==
In the lintel of St. Nikolas' (Agios Nikolaos) old church, there is an embossed crown of the 15th century. Also in the church dedicated to the Dormition of the Virgin, there is a Venetian funerary monument (sarcophagus) dating back to the 16th century, in which there are unknown embossed blazons. One of those depicts a lion with a sword which probably illustrates "St. Mark’s lion", the symbol of Venice. This specific embossed blazon is also present on the roof of the church, above the chancel.

== Sources ==
- Σπανάκης Στέργιος, Πόλεις και χωριά της Κρήτης (Spanakis Stergios, Cities and villages of Crete)
- Φαντάκης Ιωάννης, Οι οικισμοί της Κρήτης κατά την β’ Βυζαντινή περίοδο (Fantakis Yiannis, The settlements of Crete in the second Byzantine period)
