= Astrakiano Gorge =

Greek gorge

Coordinates: 35°14′12.125″N 25°13′30.72″E

Astrakiano Gorge (Greek: Αστρακιανό Φαράγγι) is a gorge near Heraklion, Crete.

== Etymology ==
The gorge gets its name from the village of Astrakí (el).

== Location ==
Astrakiano gorge is part of a larger geological complex known as the Juktas ecopark. It starts near the village of Peza and runs for about 12.5 kilometres (7.8 mi) towards the north and parallel to Kounaviano gorge. The two gorges meet at Kaki Rachi near the village of Skalani (el), forming the Karteros gorge. Astrakiano gorge can be entered at various locations along its length, i.e. Peza, Kato Astraki, Agies Paraskies, Aitania. Karteros river flows through the gorge.

== Features ==
Astrakiano gorge has lush vegetation that includes plane trees, willows, kermes oaks and fig trees. Certain of its parts are not well signed and difficult to cross due to vegetation. Near the abandoned village of Kato Astraki, the gorge is spanned by a stone arch bridge known as Astrakiani Kamara (Αστρακιανή Καμάρα), built in the early 20th century. The Neraidospilios (Νεραϊδόσπηλιος) cave and a small pond is within a short distance. Around 10 watermills operated along the gorge before WW II; they are all abandoned today.

== See also ==
- Kounaviano Gorge
