= San Giovanni Battista, Pieve di Trebbio =

Parish church in Guiglia, Italy

Coordinates: 44.399547°N 10.94985°E

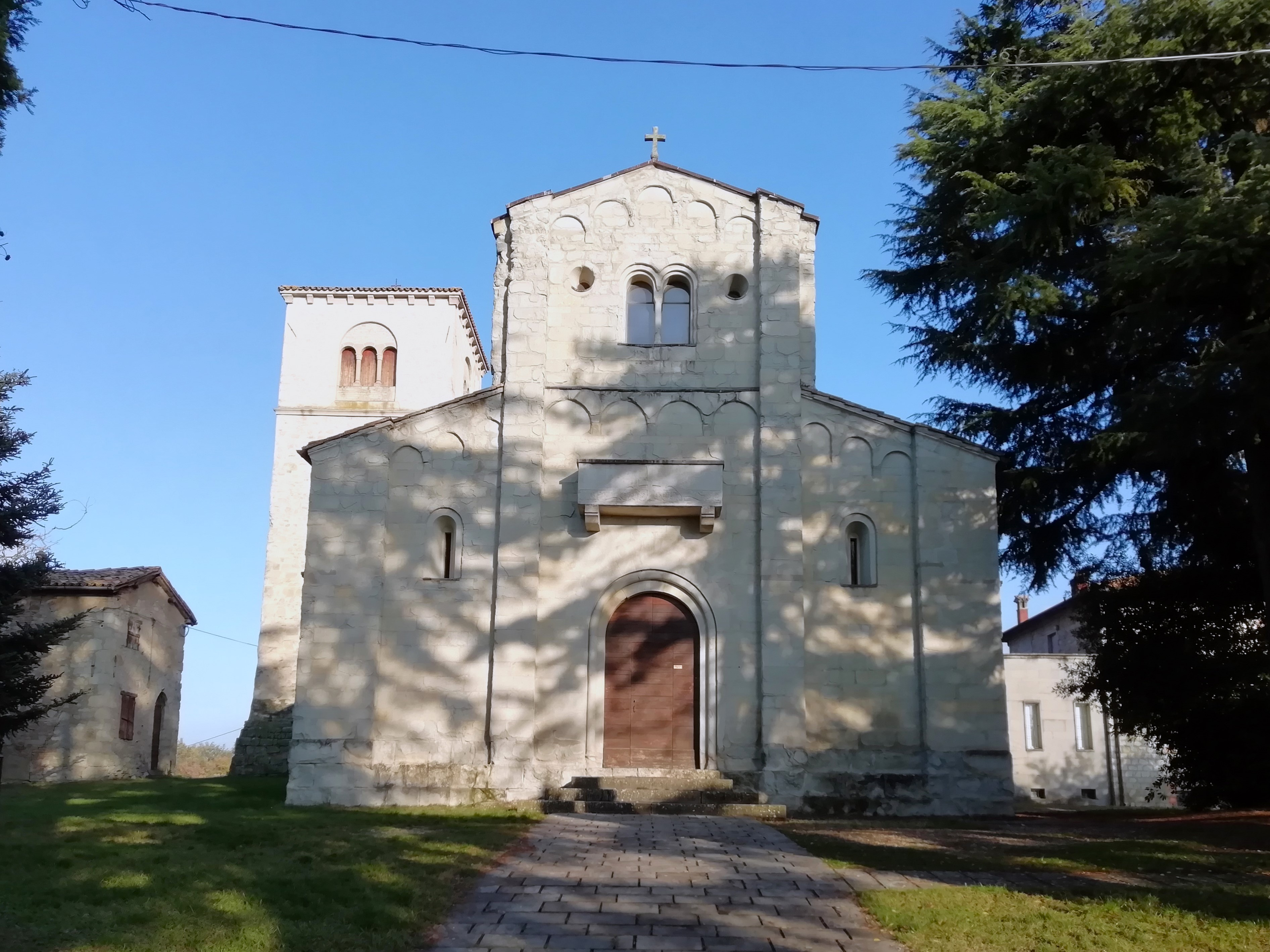
Church of San Giovanni Battista, Pieve di Trebbio, Emilia-Romagna, Italy.

San Giovanni Battista is Romanesque-style, Roman Catholic parish church located in the frazione of Pieve di Trebbio, outside of the town of Guiglia in the region of Emilia-Romagna, Italy.

== History ==
A church at the site is documented since the 10th century founded by the Countess Matilde of Canossa; it became a parish church by 1108. The narrow nave is flanked by two aisles, sports four arches. These are rounded but contain rounded column pilasters. The sanctuary altar is covered by a ciborium. Various elements of the stone church have Romanesque carvings, including one of the entrance portals.
