= Ambas Gorge and Waterfall =

Coordinates: 34.9595°N 25.1357°E

The Ambas Gorge and Waterfall (Greek: Φαράγγι και Καταρράκτης Αμπά) are natural formations located in the Asterousia Mountains range of Crete.

== Location ==
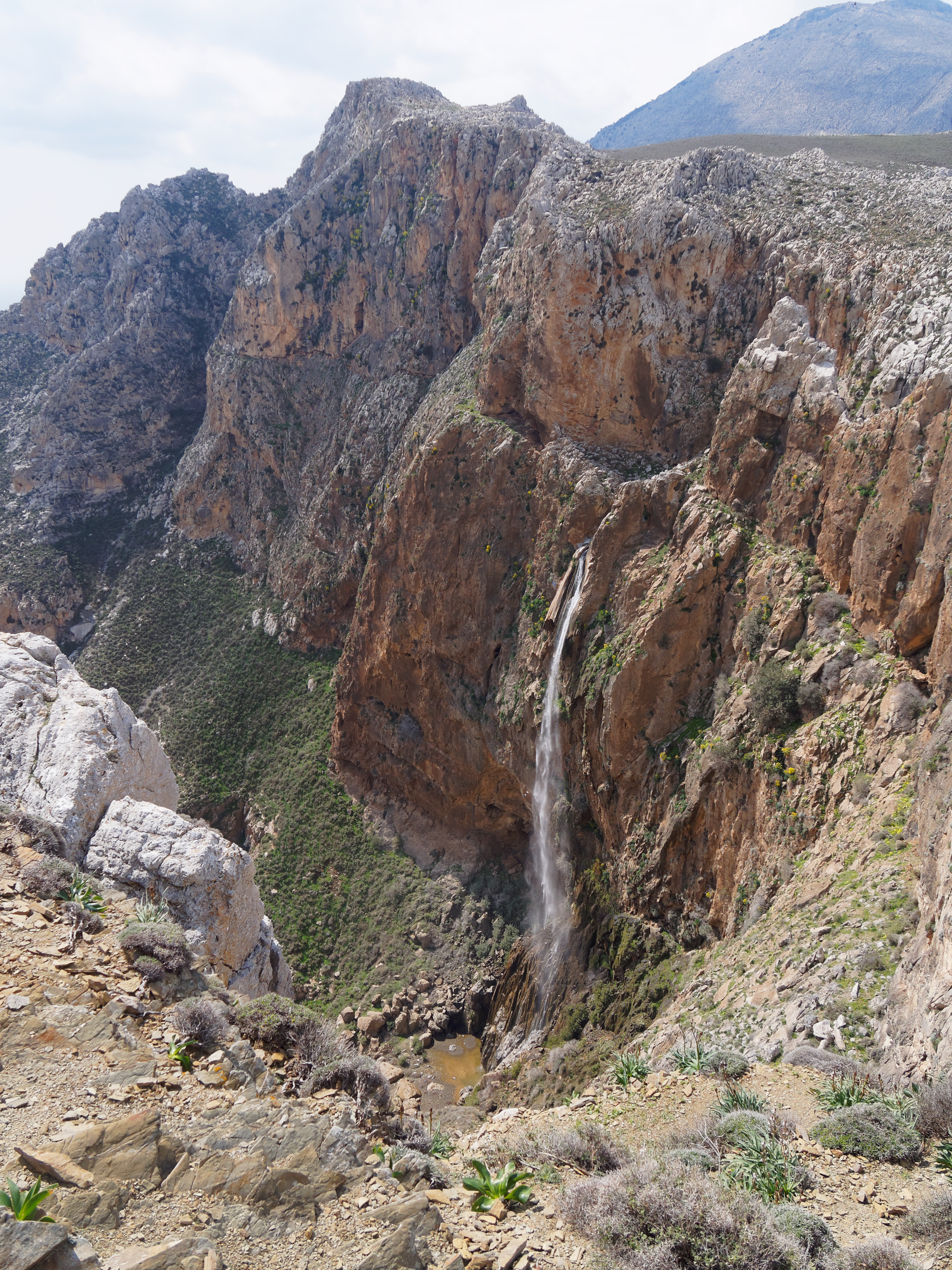
Ambas waterfall

The Ambas Gorge is located about 50 kilometers south of Heraklion in the rugged Asterousia Mountains. It is carved by the Mousoulis (Greek: Μουσούλης) stream, which drains water from the Paranymfi (el) and Amygdalos (el) at an altitude of approximately 700 meters. The river flows peacefully across the plateau before plunging down the rocky Asterousia fault line to create the breathtaking Ambas waterfall. The name Ambas comes from the Latin word abbas (meaning "abbot"), likely referring to one of the many hermit monks who in earlier times lived secluded in the Asterousia Mountains.

The waterfall can be reached via a signposted road after the village of Paranymfi, heading toward the remote beach of Tris Eklisies (el). Just above the waterfall lies a parking area next to the ruins of an old watermill. From there, a short trail follows the edge of the cliff to a spectacular viewpoint offering panoramic views of both the waterfall and the Cretan Sea beyond.

== Features ==
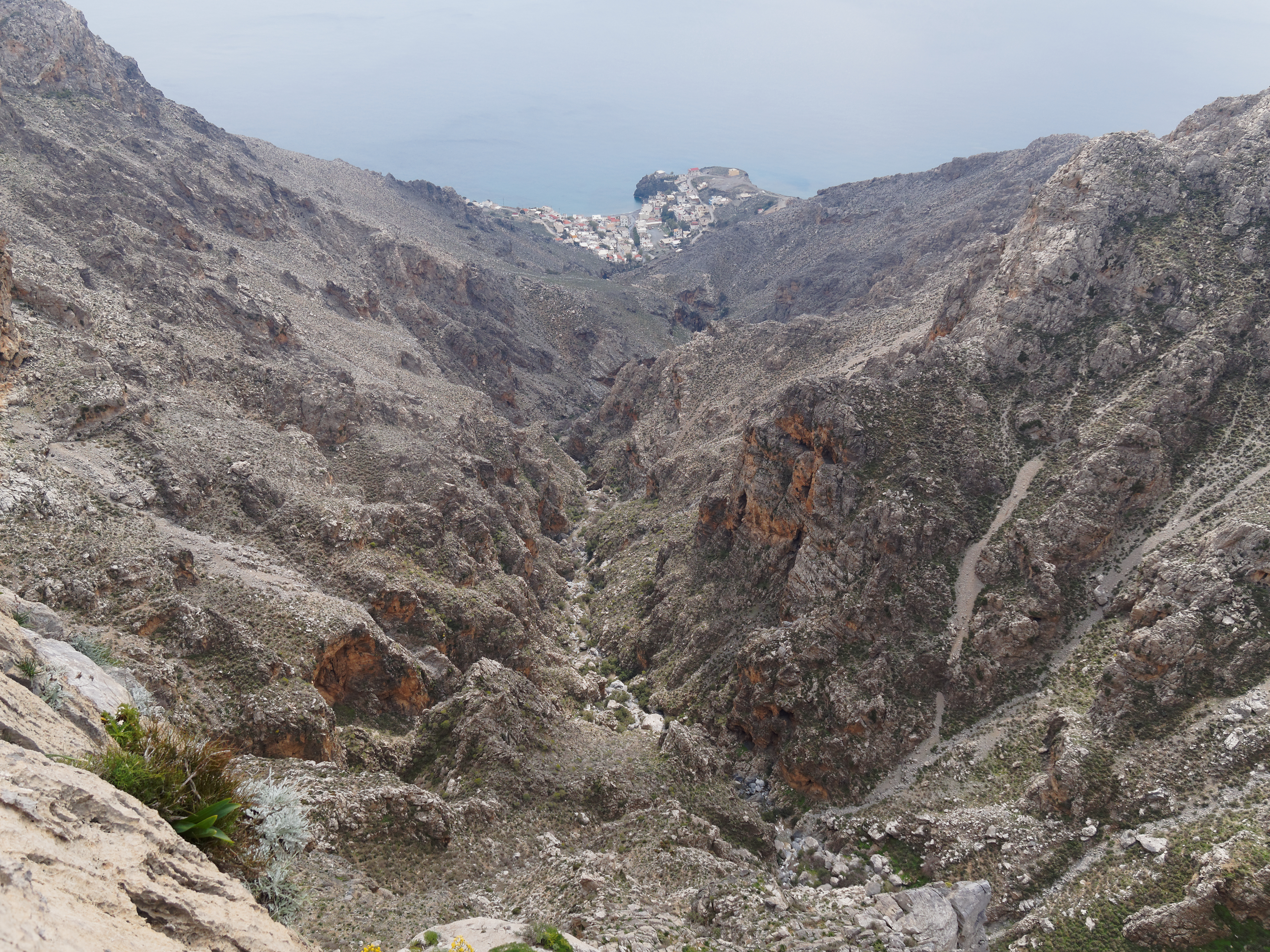
Ambas gorge

The Ambas waterfall stands at an impressive 145 meters, making it one of the highest vertical waterfalls in Greece—second only to the 215-meter Mastoras waterfall in Ha Gorge and the 240-meter Perdika waterfall in Samaria Gorge. This majestic drop forms where the terrain suddenly shifts from smooth plateau to rugged cliff. Descending to the base of the waterfall is not possible without technical climbing gear.

Beyond the main waterfall, the gorge continues its descent towards the sea, featuring a series of smaller waterfalls. The entire canyon has been secured and is suitable for experienced canyoners, who can traverse it in about 7 hours. In total, there are 21 rappels, the tallest of which is 45 meters (the main waterfall is divided into four free-hanging sections).

The cliffs of the greater Asterousia region are known for hosting the largest island-based population of birds of prey in Europe.

== See also ==
- Asterousia Mountains
