= Guiglia =

- Comune
- Comune di Guiglia
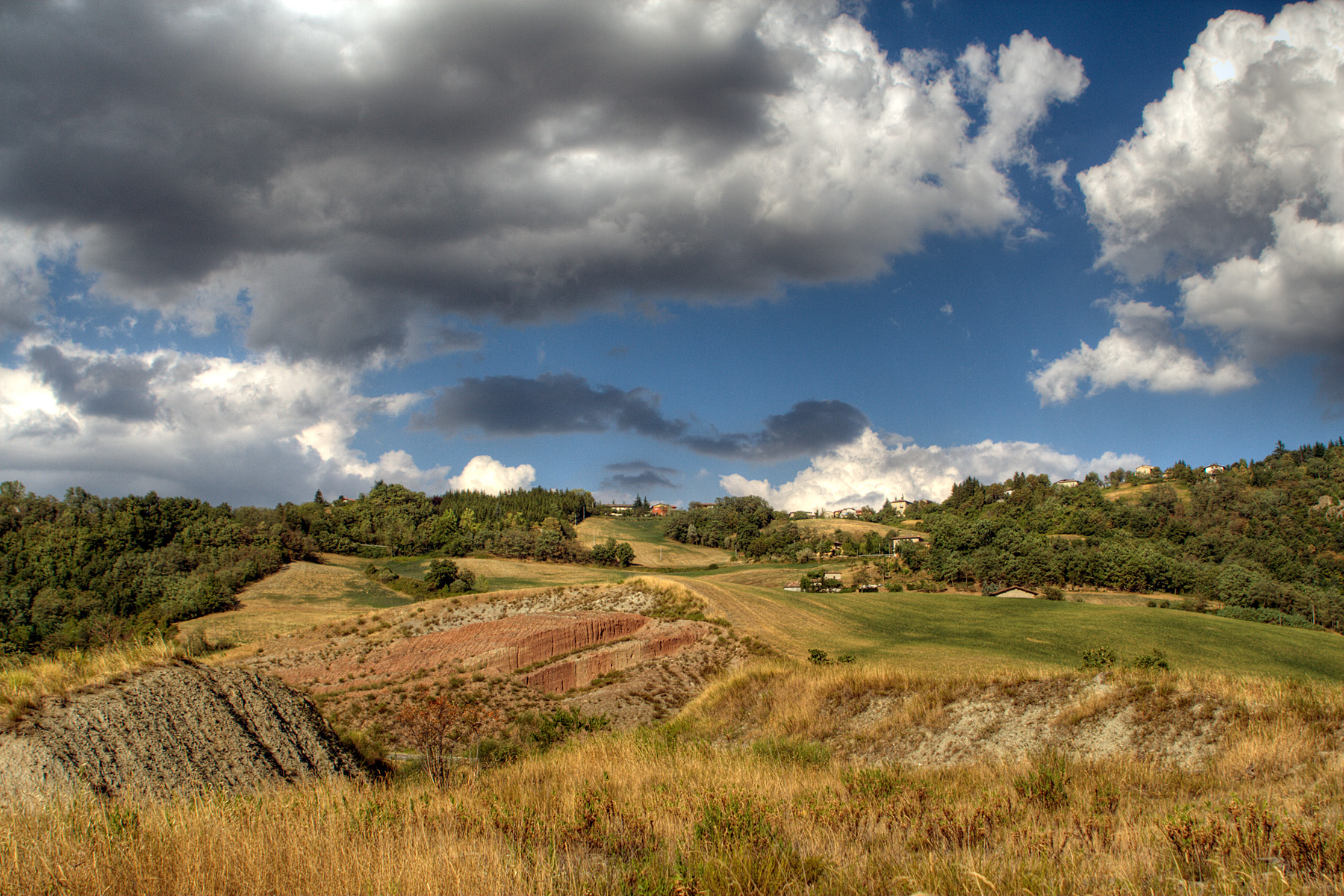
- Samone, a frazione of Guiglia.

- Coat of arms

- Location within Italy Location within Emilia-Romagna
- Coordinates: 44°25′N 10°58′E
- Country: Italy
- Region: Emilia-Romagna
- Province: Modena (MO)
- Frazioni: Castellino, Gainazzo, Monteorsello, Pieve di Trebbio, Rocca Malatina, Rocchetta, Samone

Government
  - Mayor: Iacopo Lagazzi

Area
  - Total: 48.3 km^{2} (18.6 sq mi)
- Elevation: 490 m (1,610 ft)

Population (31 March 2017)
  - Total: 3,869
  - Density: 80.1/km^{2} (207/sq mi)
- Demonym: Guigliesi
- Time zone: UTC+1 (CET)
  - Summer (DST): UTC+2 (CEST)
- Postal code: 41052
- Dialing code: 059
- Website: Official website

Guiglia (Frignanese: Guîa or Guéa) is a comune (municipality) in the Province of Modena in the Italian region Emilia-Romagna, located about 30 kilometres (19 mi) southwest of Bologna and about 25 kilometres (16 mi) south of Modena.

Guiglia borders the following municipalities: Valsamoggia, Marano sul Panaro, Pavullo nel Frignano, Savignano sul Panaro, Zocca.

Among its churches is San Geminiano, Guiglia and San Giovanni Battista, Pieve di Trebbio.
