= Smari =

Smari Σμάρι
- Community
- Location within Greece
- Coordinates: 35°14.9′N 25°18.4′E
- Country: Greece
- Administrative region: Crete
- Regional unit: Heraklion
- Municipality: Minoa Pediada
- Municipal unit: Kastelli
- Elevation: 320 m (1,050 ft)

Population (2021)
  - Community: 328
- Time zone: UTC+2 (EET)
  - Summer (DST): UTC+3 (EEST)

Smari (Greek: Σμάρι) is a traditional small Cretan village, only 7 km (4 mi) away from the town of Kastelli and only 23 km (14 mi). away from Heraklion, which is the capital of the island of Crete. According to the 2021 census, it has 328 permanent inhabitants.

The village is first mentioned in 1375 in a document of the Ducal Archive of Chandax. In it you will find old stone houses that have been restored, alleys, and ruins of older buildings and pottery workshops where you can purchase copies of Byzantine and Minoan ceramics.

Agriculture and animal farming are the main activities of people staying permanently at the village. Traditionally, olive oil, wine and animal products have been the main source of income. In earlier years the village has been famous for its male population who were known traders of olive oil. They had been crossing the Crete Island by horses or donkeys selling olive oil. Instead of money, mostly they had been paid in form of other products, which were not possible to be produced at Smari. Smari is one of the few villages in the area which is characterized by a cultural, social and building growth during the recent years. This is due to a variety of factors. Among them the foremost is the love of the local people to revive the tradition. They have created a very active cultural association which is the cornerstone of each new effort towards the future. There is a lively Cretan feast on July 20 in honour of Profitis Ilias, with much rejoicing, singing and dancing.

== Historic data ==
=== Archaeology ===
Smari has a very long history and was inhabited, according to reliable sources, from the proto-Minoan period onwards. The archeological relics in the Akropolis of the hill called Profitis Hlias, excavated under the direction of the Archeologist D. Hatzi Vallianou, indicate a continuous human presence from the Middle-Minoan period to about 630 B.C. On the top of the hill, on a field surface of 30 by 40 m (131 ft), called Troulli, surrounded by a fortification wall, three rectangular constructions matching megaron buildings were excavated as well as a sanctuary of Athina Ergani, courtyards, and additional secondary buildings, all dating back to the Geometric/Eastern period (800-630 B.C.) Earlier remains dating to the Middle-Minoan/Old-Palatial periods were also found, even though the architectural remains from these periods have not been preserved except on the surrounding wall, which was built according to Pythagorean Theorem. According to the Archeologist-researcher D.Hadzi-Vallianou these buildings were the seat of the local Hegemon (powerful leader) of the area during the Geometric/Eastern periods. The detection of social structures similar to those described by Homer as belonging to aristocrats could lead us to believe that Troulli was the seat of the ancient Homeric Lyttos Surrounding these buildings on the top of Troulli, excavations have also revealed a few more buildings, store rooms, workshops and one building containing a pyre. In the wider area of Smari there have also been discovered the remains of ten buildings dating from the Minoan to the Roman Empire periods, the most important of which are the vaulted tomb at the hill of Livaditsa and one Roman rural residence at the entrance to the villa.

=== Name ===
The name stems from the Greek word "smari" which is used to describe a dense populated place. It is claimed that Smari was such a place in the past.

=== Churches ===
Going down from Smari Acropolis (Alt. 594 m (1,949 ft)) in the direction to Smari village, you can see the church of Profitis Ilias among the trees and gushing water.

Next to it stands the church of Agios Georgios which is covered in wall paintings.

At the southern side of the Acropolis is the Kallergi monastery, a place of calm and recollection.

There are also other churches with frescoes like the one dedicated to Sotir Christos, the Koimisi tis Panagias and Agios Giorgos. Another important church is the one of Agios Ioannis.
