= Partira =

Partira Πάρτιρα
- Community
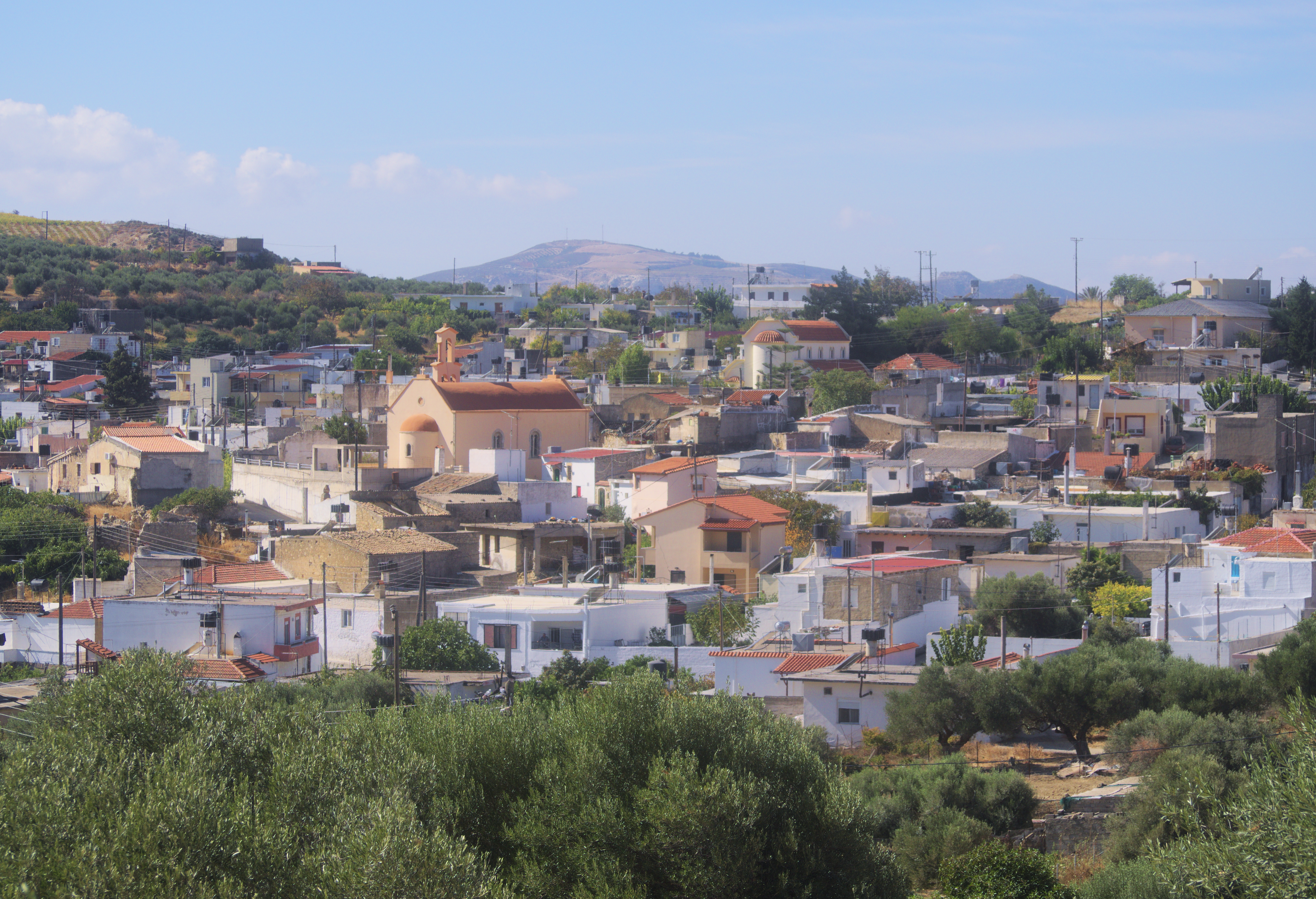
- Aerial view of the village

- Location within Greece
- Coordinates: 35°07′N 25°13′E
- Country: Greece
- Administrative region: Crete
- Regional unit: Heraklion
- Municipality: Minoa Pediada
- Municipal unit: Arkalochori

Population (2021)
  - Community: 364
- Time zone: UTC+2 (EET)
  - Summer (DST): UTC+3 (EEST)

Partira is a village and a community in Crete. Belongs to Minoa Pediada municipality and it is located near Arkalochori in the regional unit of Heraklion. Its population is 364 (2021). The residents are engaged in rural work.
