= Epano Vatheia =

Epano Vatheia Επάνω Βάθεια
- Community
- Location within Greece
- Coordinates: 35°17′N 25°14′E
- Country: Greece
- Administrative region: Crete
- Regional unit: Heraklion
- Municipality: Hersonissos
- Municipal unit: Gouves

Population (2021)
  - Community: 285
- Time zone: UTC+2 (EET)
  - Summer (DST): UTC+3 (EEST)

Epano Vatheia is a Greek village in the Heraklion regional unit, Crete, Greece. It is located at an altitude of 260 m, some 17 kilometres from the city of Heraklion, in the valley of the Stavromenos river. Its population numbers 285 (2021).

== History ==
Of historical interest is the old church of Saint Antony, with remains of murals. The church is reported in notarial contracts in 1271 as well as in a document dating to 1394. In 1583, it is reported to have numbered 125 residents. In the Ottoman inventory 1671 it is recorded as having fifteen families, while in the Egyptian inventory of 1834 it has 10 Christian and 3 Muslim ("Cretan Turks") families. On the contrary, in the inventory of 1881 only 2 Christians and 225 Muslims were reported. By 1900, it numbered only 10 residents, and none in 1920. By 1928 it had been repopulated, with 258 people living there.
