= Pelagius of Córdoba =

10th-century Spanish saint

Saint Pelagius of Córdoba
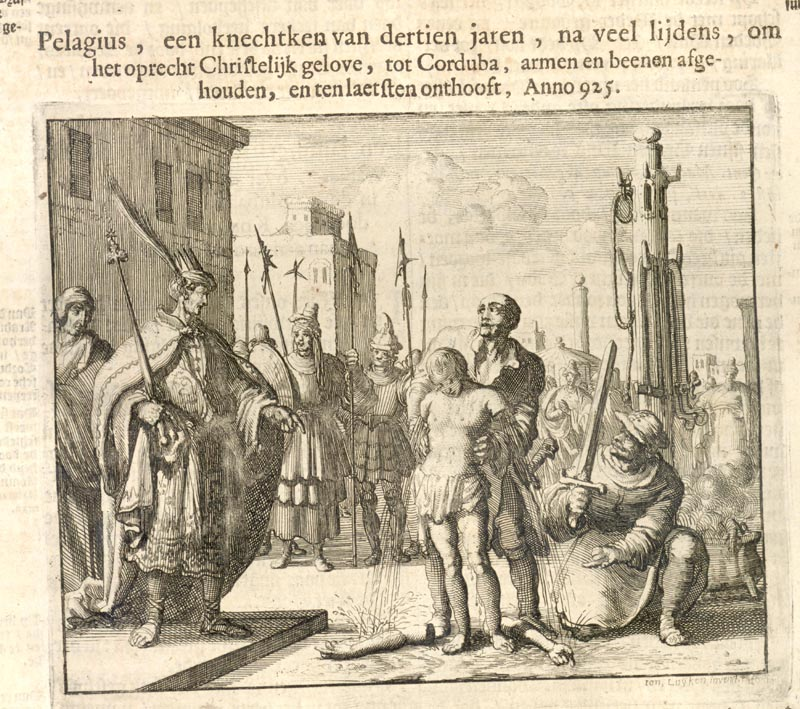
- The martyrdom of Saint Pelagius of Córdoba, engraved by Jan Luyken in the Martyrs' Mirror

Martyr
- Born: c. 912; Crecente, Kingdom of Galicia
- Died: 926; Córdoba
- Venerated in: Roman Catholic Church, Eastern Orthodox Church
- Major shrine: Oviedo
- Feast: 26 June
- Patronage: abandoned people, torture victims, Castro Urdiales, Spain

Pelagius of Córdoba (c. 912–926) (in Spanish San Pelayo Mártir) was a Christian boy who died as a martyr in Córdoba in southern Spain around 926 AD.

== Narrative ==
There are three accounts of Pelagius. The earliest, The Martyrdom/Passion of St Pelagius was written by one Raguel, a priest of Córdoba. The second is an account retold in verse by Hrotsvitha of Gandersheim; and the third is a Mozarabic liturgy from about 967 when his body was recovered and brought to Toledo (his relics were later deposited in Oviedo Cathedral).

Pelagius was left by his uncle at the age of ten as a hostage with the Caliph Abd-ar-Rahman III of al-Andalus, in trade for a clerical relative previously captured by the Moors, the bishop Hermoygius. The exchange never occurred, and Pelagius remained a captive for three years. According to the testimony of other prisoners, his courage and faith was such that the Caliph was impressed with him when he had attained the age of 13. The Caliph offered him his freedom if Pelagius converted to Islam. The boy, having remained a pious Christian, refused the Caliph's offer.

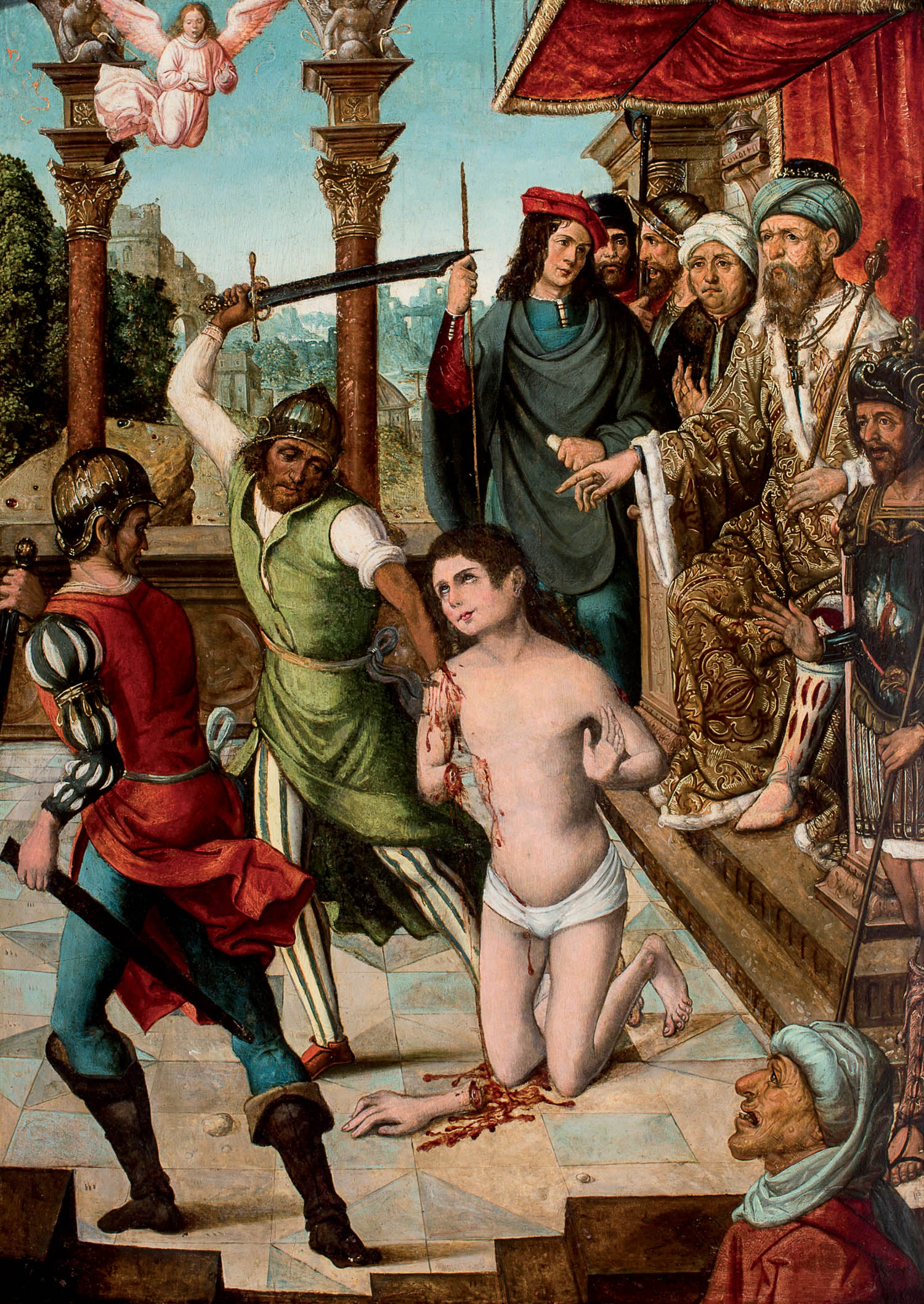
The Martyrdom of St Pelagius by the Master of Becerril

His beauty was such that the Caliph fell in love with him when he had attained the age of 13. The boy, having remained a pious Christian, refused the Caliph's advances, striking the monarch and insulting him. Enraged, Abd-ar-Rahman had the boy tortured for six hours and then dismembered. Other accounts have him being shot from a catapult over the city walls, with the Caliph expecting his body to be dashed on the rocks of the river. When Pelagius emerged from this harsh sentence unharmed, he was then decapitated. The various accounts uphold his refusal to fulfil the Caliph's wishes.

Pelagius was later enshrined as a Christian martyr and canonized as "Saint Pelagius." His commemoration is celebrated on 26 June. The cult of Saint Pelagius is thought to have provided spiritual energy for centuries to the Reconquista (the Christian reconquest of Spain), and is seen by some modern scholars as part of a pattern of portraying Islamic morality as inferior to other moral codes.

== Interpretation ==
Jeffrey A. Bowman says that The Martyrdom of St. Pelagius not only demonstrates a conventual attack on Muslim morals, but also depicts a hero who refuses to assimilate. At a time when the Christian minority was attempting to maintain its identity and traditions, its members were increasingly enticed by the more dominant culture. Cordoba was a rich, sophisticated city with many fine houses, libraries, and bath houses. "As Raguel wrote, Christians in Al-Andalus were converting to Islam in increasing numbers. Christian leaders complained that young Christians were more interested in learning Arabic than Latin."

Lisa Weston finds a similar theme in Hrotsvitha's poem. "Produced within and serving the needs of a cultic community, [the] hagiographic narrative enacts this negotiation of licit and illicit desires, and the subsequent formation of boundaries between "us" (the saint's community) and "them" (the persecutors and other non-believers) upon the textual body of the saint." The poet deplores the dissolution of the one into the other. Pelagius spurns Abd-ar-Rahman's touch saying, "It is not right that a man cleansed by the baptism of Christ should submit his chaste neck to a barbaric embrace, nor should a worshipper of Christ, anointed with the sacred chrism, accept the kiss of such a lewd slave of demons".

== See also ==
- Tribute of 100 virgins
- Martyrs of Córdoba
- Amiras

== Bibliography: historical background ==
- Jessica Coope: Martyrs of Cordoba: Community and Family Conflict in an Age of Mass Conversion: Lincoln: University of Nebraska Press: 1995: ISBN 0-8032-1471-5.
- Kenneth Wolf: Christian Martyrs in Muslim Spain: Cambridge: Cambridge University Press: 1988: ISBN 0-521-34416-6.
- Mark D. Jordan, The Invention of Sodomy in Christian Theology, Chicago, 1997; pp. 10–28
