= San Geminiano, Guiglia =

Church in Guiglia, Italy

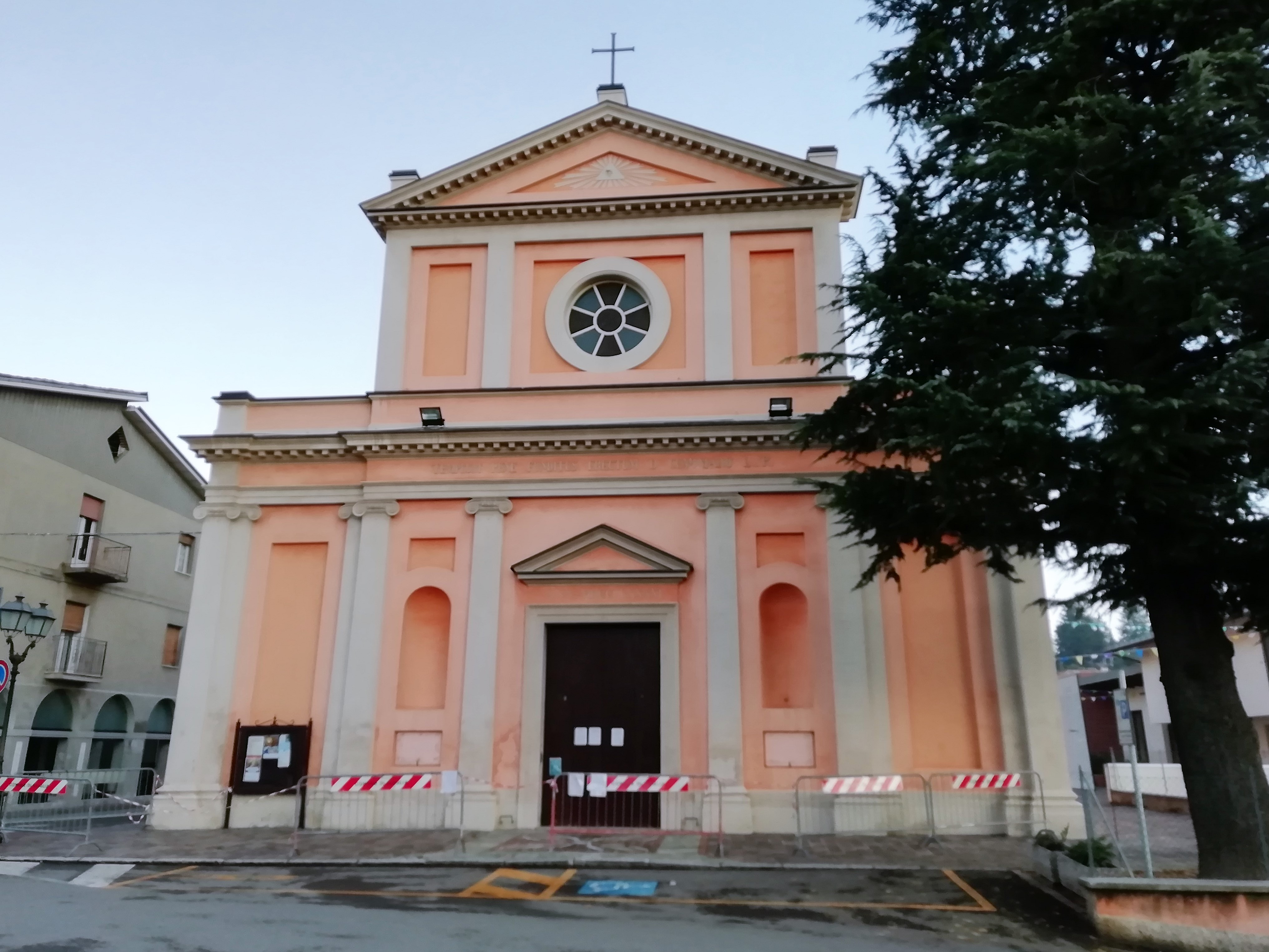
San Geminiano, Guiglia.jpg

San Geminiano is Roman Catholic parish church located on Via Monteolo in the center of the hamlet of Guiglia in the province of Modena, region of Emilia-Romagna, Italy.

== History ==
A church at the site is documented since 892, but another church erected in 1492. It was again rebuilt, this time in an eclectic Neoclassical style in 1891, and dedicated to St Geminianus, patron of Modena. The pediment of the facade has a central oculus.

The interior is notable for a Madonna with St George, a 17th-century copy of an Antonio Correggio painting now in the Gemaldegalerie of Dresden. The aisles have a 17th-century Via Crucis. There is a 16th-century silver crucifix attritubuted to Da Porto. The bell-tower was razed in 1950 due to its instability; the newer bell-tower had a discrepant style, and was thus removed in 2011.
