= Pietro Castrofilaca =

Pietro Castrofilaca (Greek: Πέτρος Καστροφύλακας) was a Venetian notary and accountant, His name in Greek language means keeper of the castle, probably born in the city of Candia (modern Heraklion). Castrofilaca was the secretary of the syndics Zuanne Gritti and Giulio Garzoni. He is known for the census he carried out in the 16th century.

Castrofilaca conducted a systematic recording of the population of Crete. His census was based on an earlier census carried out in 1577 by the predictor Foscarini. The text of the census is preserved today in the Marciana National Library in Venice.
