= Amiras =

Slave freed by Saint George

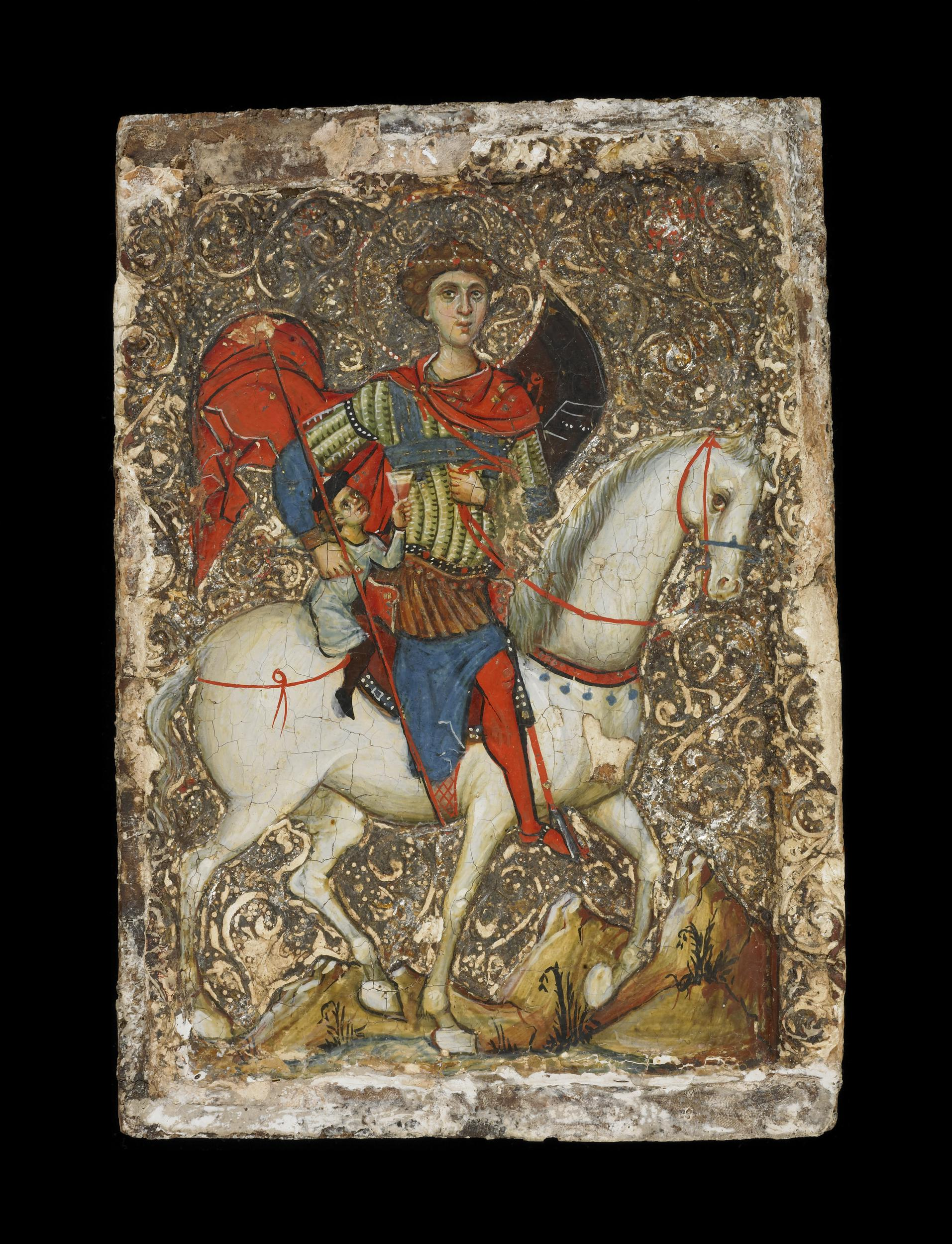
Icon of Saint George and the youth of Mytilene, c. 13th century A.D.

Amiras, also known as the youth of Mytilene, was a slave who according to tradition was freed by Saint George from his master.

== Narrative ==
According to the Greek text of the posthumous miracles of Saint George, Amiras was a young Christian boy from the city of Mytilene. He was taken from his family and forced to serve as a Muslim prince's cupbearer on the island of Crete. Amiras prayed to Saint George to save him and a year later the Saint appeared on his white horse, rescuing the boy while he was serving wine to the prince and carried him across the Aegean Sea back to his mother.

The story of Amiras is popular in both Greece and Lebanon. Frescoes of the young man appear in the four churches of Eddé al-Batroun, Saidat el -Rih in Enfeh, Blatt near Byblos and Bhdaydat. Amiras is usually depicted with a towel, a beaker of wine and a fez (tarbush). Interestingly, some sources and depictions portray Amiras as serving coffee but this is considered an anachronism as coffee did not become popularized in the Arab world until the 17th century.

== Bibliography ==
- Kanaan, Marlène (2008). "Legends, Places and Traditions Related to the Cult of Saint George in Lebanon". ARAM Periodical. 20 (1): 203–219. doi:10.2143/ARAM.20.0.2033130.
- British Museum. "Object: Icon with St George and the youth of Mytilene". britishmuseum.org. The Trustees of the British Museum.
- Cormack, Robin. "St George And The Youth Of Mytilene". iconmuseum.org. The Icon Museum and Study Center.

== See also ==
- Pelagius of Córdoba
- John the Russian
- Josephine Bakhita
