= Asterousia Mountains =

Mountain range in Greece

Coordinates: 34°58′N 25°05′E

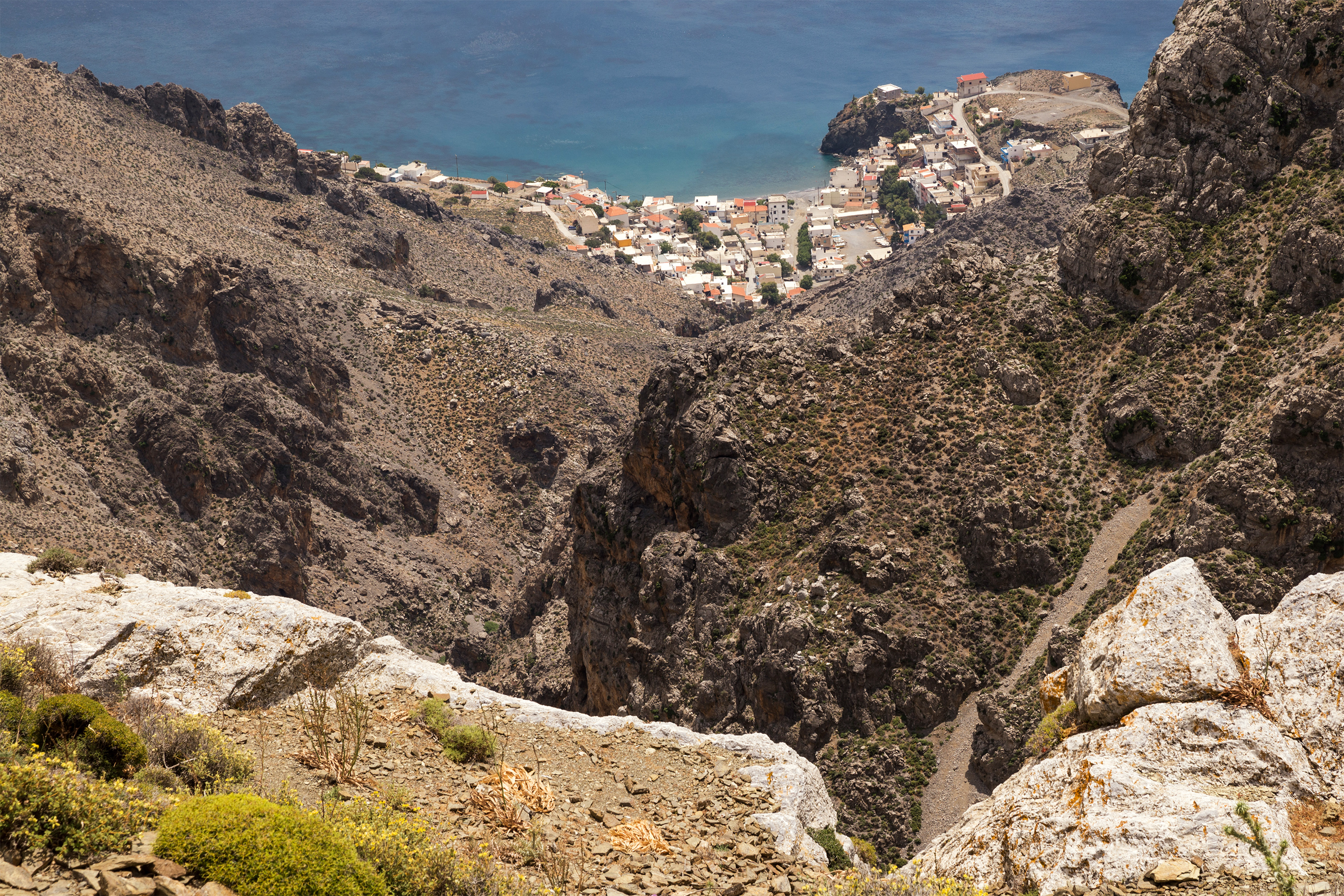
- Asterousia Mountains, Crete

Highest point
- Elevation: 1,231 m (4,039 ft)
- Parent peak: Kofinas

Geography
- Location: Crete

Geology
- Mountain type: Mountain range

The Asterousia Mountains are a range in southern Crete separating the Messara Plain from the Libyan Sea. Evidence of ancient Cretan cultures have been found in excavations performed within sites contained in this range; moreover, one of the most significant Minoan sites on Crete has been excavated at nearby Phaistos to the north; apparently, the Phaistos palace was designed to permit views over the expansive Messara Plain and the Asterousi Mountains. A further historical name for this range is reported by Encyclopædia Britannica as the Kofinos Range, named after the highest peak of Asteroussia, Kofinas (1231 m).

The village of Kapetaniana sits on the southern slope of the mountains.

== See also ==
- Hagia Triada
- Ambas Gorge and Waterfall
