= Savignano sul Panaro =

- Comune
- Comune di Savignano sul Panaro
- Coat of arms

- Location within Italy Location within Emilia-Romagna
- Coordinates: 44°29′N 11°2′E
- Country: Italy
- Region: Emilia-Romagna
- Province: Modena (MO)
- Frazioni: Castello, Doccia, Mulino, Formica, Garofano, Magazzeno

Government
  - Mayor: Enrico Tagliavini

Area
  - Total: 25.55 km^{2} (9.86 sq mi)
- Elevation: 202 m (663 ft)

Population (31 December 2016)
  - Total: 9,172
  - Density: 359.0/km^{2} (929.8/sq mi)
- Demonym: Savignanesi
- Time zone: UTC+1 (CET)
  - Summer (DST): UTC+2 (CEST)
- Postal code: 41056
- Dialing code: 059
- Patron saint: Assumption of Mary
- Saint day: August 15
- Website: Official website

Savignano sul Panaro (Modenese: Savgnân d'cò Pànèra; Western Bolognese: Savignàn) is a comune (municipality) in the Province of Modena in the Italian region Emilia-Romagna, located about 25 kilometres (16 mi) west of Bologna and about 20 kilometres (12 mi) southeast of Modena.

Savignano sul Panaro borders the following municipalities: Guiglia, Marano sul Panaro, San Cesario sul Panaro, Spilamberto, Valsamoggia, Vignola.
