= Marano sul Panaro =

- Comune
- Comune di Marano sul Panaro
- Coat of arms

- Location within Italy Location within Emilia-Romagna
- Coordinates: 44°27′N 10°58′E
- Country: Italy
- Region: Emilia-Romagna
- Province: Modena (MO)
- Frazioni: Ca' Bonettini, Casona, Denzano, Festà, Ospitaletto, Rodiano, Villabianca

Government
  - Mayor: Giovanni Galli

Area
  - Total: 45.2 km^{2} (17.5 sq mi)
- Elevation: 142 m (466 ft)

Population (31 July 2009)
  - Total: 4,541
  - Density: 100/km^{2} (260/sq mi)
- Demonym: Maranesi
- Time zone: UTC+1 (CET)
  - Summer (DST): UTC+2 (CEST)
- Postal code: 41054
- Dialing code: 059
- Patron saint: St. Lawrence
- Saint day: August 10
- Website: Official website

Marano sul Panaro (Modenese: Marân) is a comune (municipality) in the Province of Modena in the Italian region Emilia-Romagna, located about 30 kilometres (19 miles) west of Bologna and about 20 kilometres (12 miles) south of Modena.

Marano sul Panaro borders the following municipalities: Castelvetro di Modena, Guiglia, Maranello, Pavullo nel Frignano, Savignano sul Panaro, Serramazzoni, Vignola.

== Twin towns ==
- Kofinas, Greece
- Montlouis-sur-Loire, France
