= Thrapsano =

Thrapsano Θραψανό
- Municipal unit
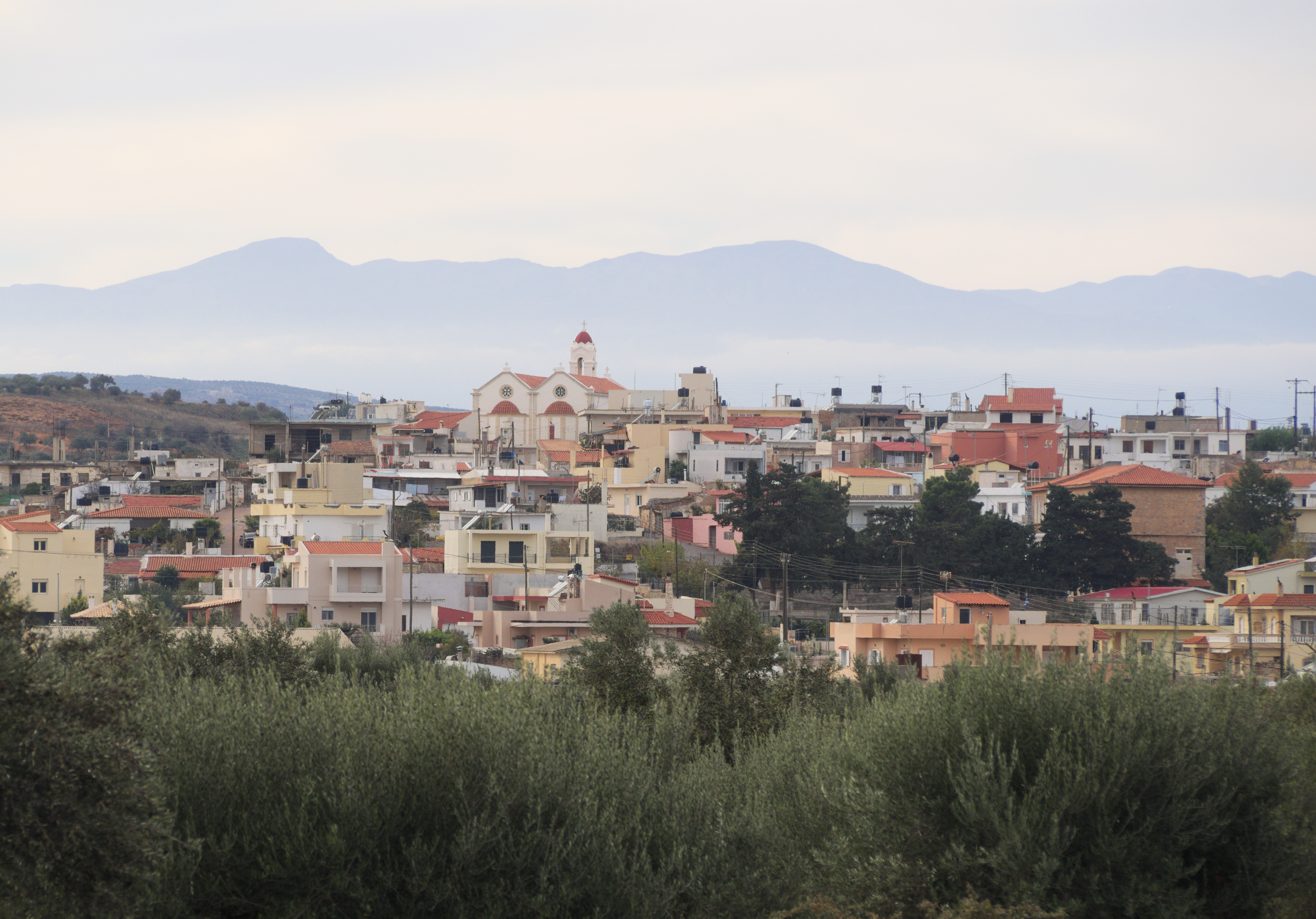
- View from east

- Location within the regional unit

- Location within Greece
- Coordinates: 35°11′N 25°17′E
- Country: Greece
- Administrative region: Crete
- Regional unit: Heraklion
- Municipality: Minoa Pediada

Area
  - Municipal unit: 37.3 km^{2} (14.4 sq mi)

Population (2021)
  - Municipal unit: 1,588
  - Municipal unit density: 42.6/km^{2} (110/sq mi)
  - Community: 956
- Time zone: UTC+2 (EET)
  - Summer (DST): UTC+3 (EEST)

Thrapsano (Greek: Θραψανό) is a former municipality in the Heraklion regional unit, Crete, Greece. Since the 2011 local government reform it is part of the municipality Minoa Pediada, of which it is a municipal unit. The municipal unit has an area of 37.292 km^{2} (14.399 sq mi), and a population of 1,588 as of 2021.

Thrapsano village is located roughly 30 km southeast of Heraklion, at an altitude of 340 m. It was a community until the 1998 Kapodistria plan, when it became a municipal district of the municipality of Thrapsano. The village is—at least in Crete—well known, especially to seniors, because of the Ventema. The Ventema was a summer campaign and temporary installation in various places of Crete, with earth ideal for pottery and much wood for the furnace, which lasted until mid-September. Thrapsano potters worked in teams to manufacture big jars called pitharia, as well as other earthen vessels. These objects were fragile, and transportation from Thrapsano was risky via donkey and mule transportation. A proverb says, "Everybody fears God, and Thrapsaniotis the walls."

Thrapsano is still identified with pottery, particularly with the manufacture of pitharia, and its residents (Thrapsaniotis) are considered descendants of the Minoan potters.
