= Sykologos =

Sykologos Συκολόγος
- Community
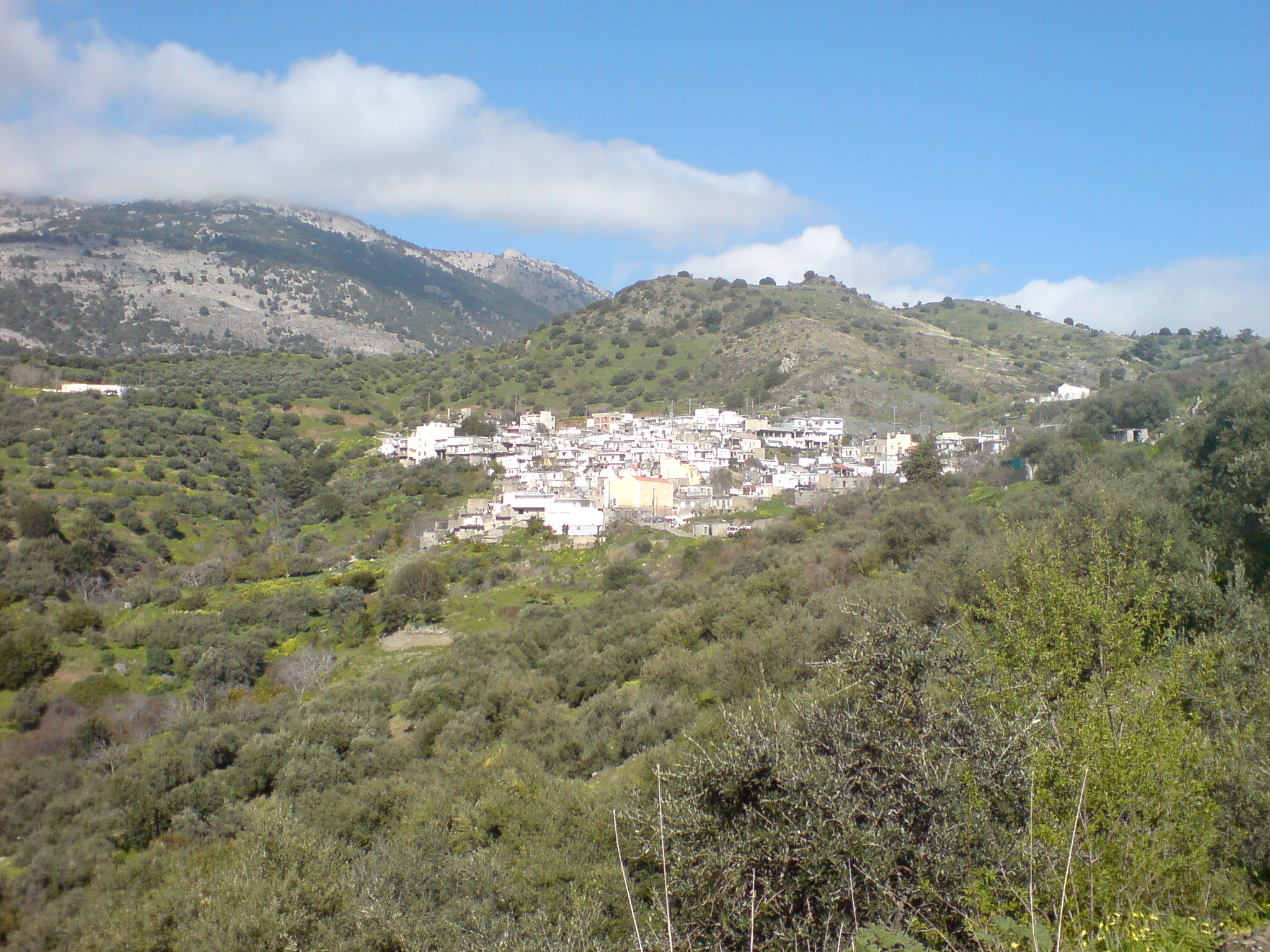

- Location within Greece
- Coordinates: 35°1.2′N 25°30.7′E
- Country: Greece
- Administrative region: Crete
- Regional unit: Heraklion
- Municipality: Viannos

Population (2021)
  - Community: 305
- Time zone: UTC+2 (EET)
  - Summer (DST): UTC+3 (EEST)

Sykologos (Greek: Συκολόγος) is a village and a community in the southeastern part of the Heraklion regional unit, in Crete, Greece. The community includes the villages Ano Vigla and Tertsa. It is 81.5 km from Heraklion, 16 km from Ano Viannos, 28 km from Ierapetra and 7.5 km from the coastline of the Libyan Sea at Tertsa. Today it is a part of Municipality of Viannos. Olives and bananas are the main crops. The name Sykologos stems from an ancient word for "fig collector".

== Population ==
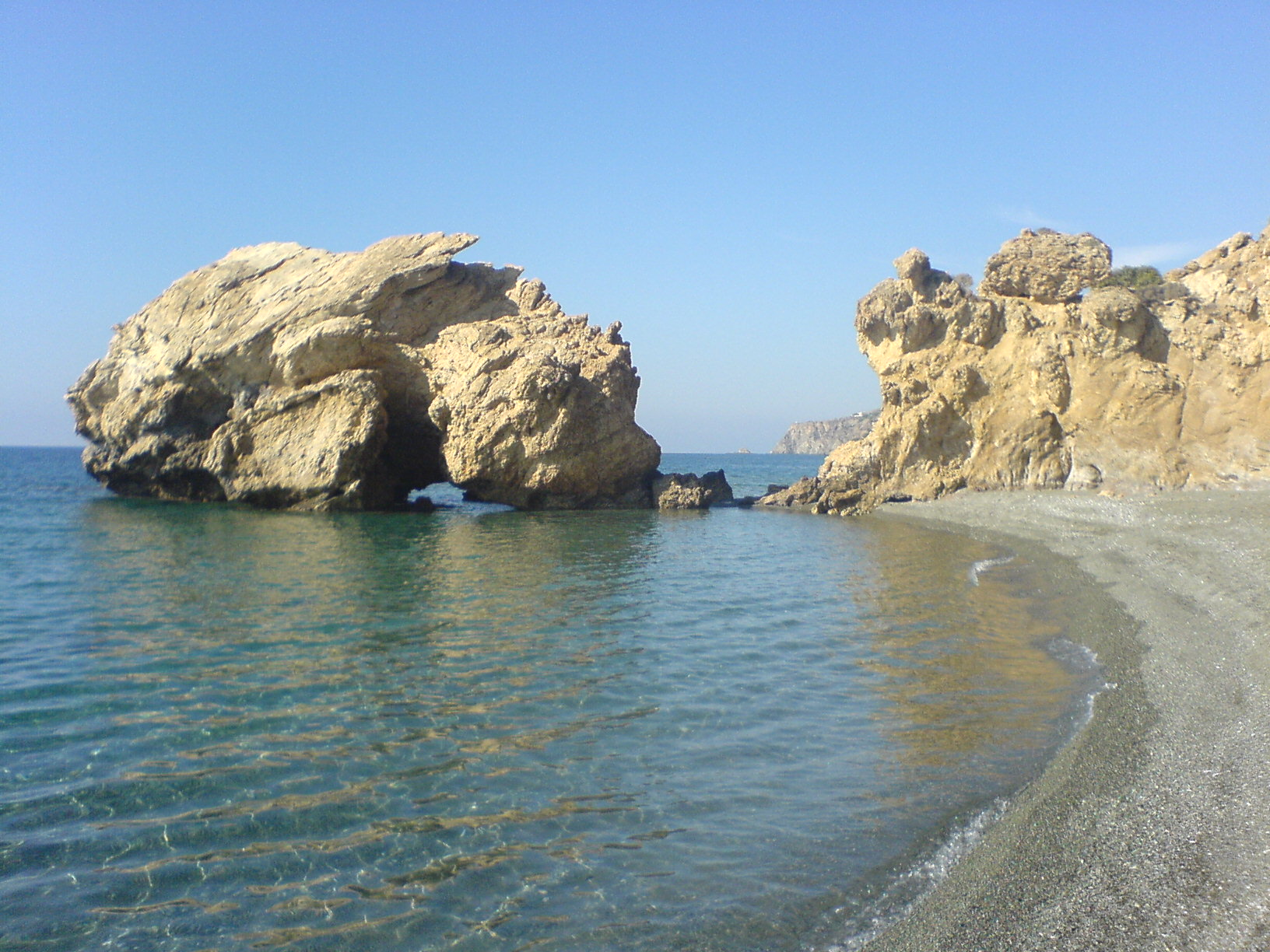
The rock "Psarocharako" in Tertsa.

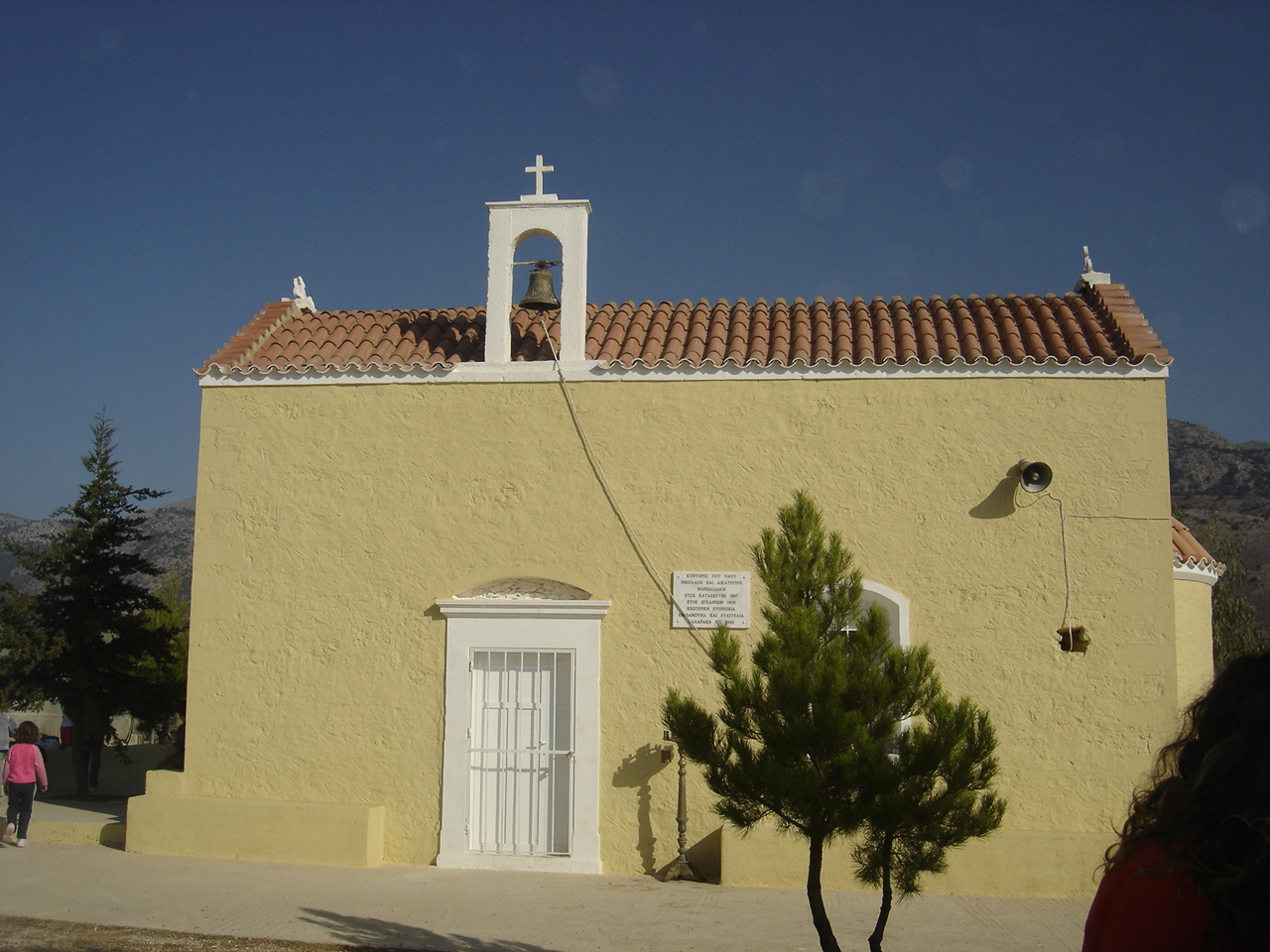
The Church of Afentis Christos.

Historical population
Year	Pop.	±%
1951	532	—
1961	523	−1.7%
1971	487	−6.9%
1981	474	−2.7%
1991	371	−21.7%
2001	362	−2.4%
2011	396	+9.4%
2021	305	−23.0%
