= Stavies =

Stavies Στάβιες
- Community
- Location within Greece
- Coordinates: 35°00′18″N 25°01′59″E
- Country: Greece
- Administrative region: Crete
- Regional unit: Heraklion
- Municipality: Gortyna
- Municipal unit: Kofinas

Population (2021)
  - Community: 467
- Time zone: UTC+2 (EET)
  - Summer (DST): UTC+3 (EEST)

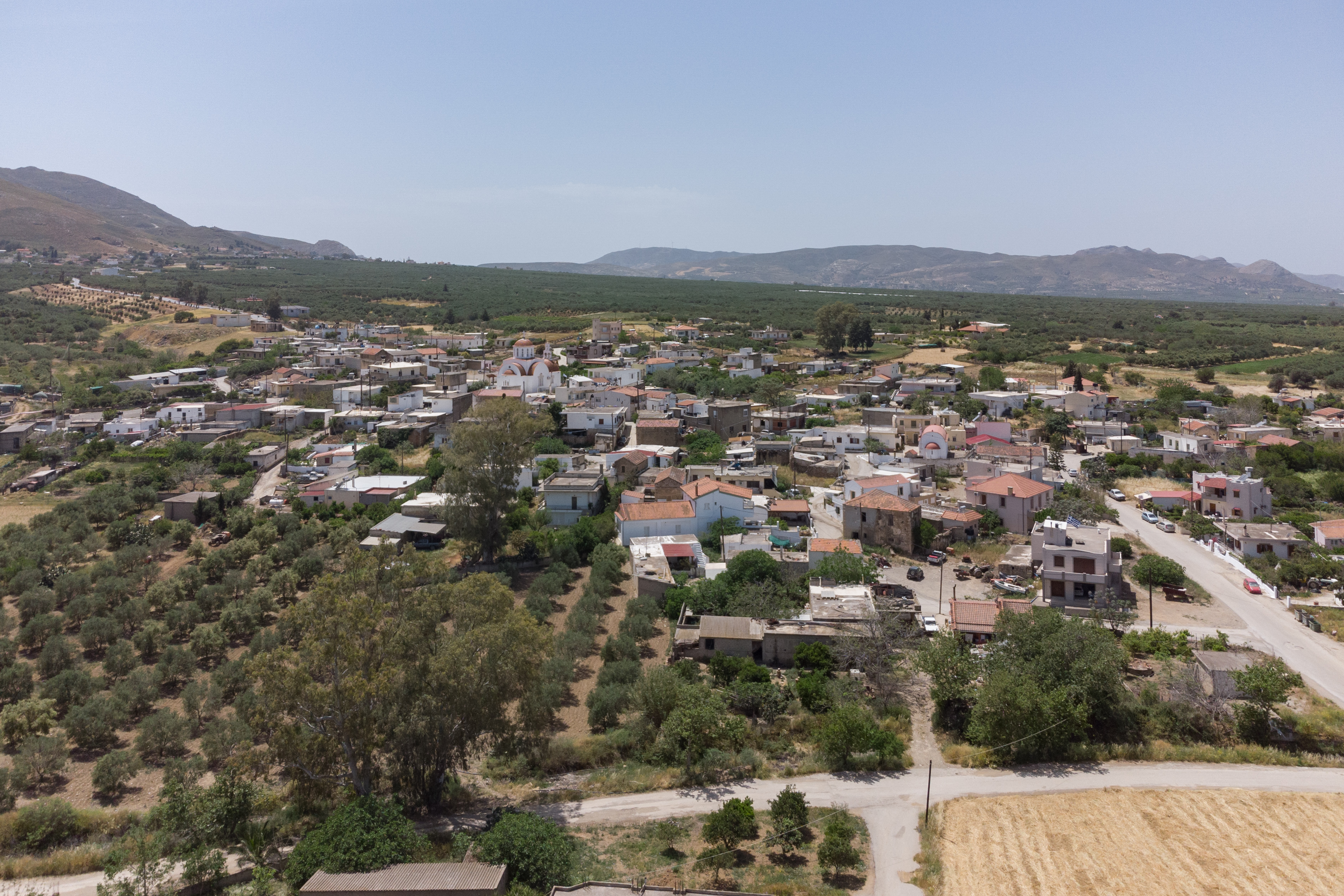
This is an airview of Stavies (from the east).

Stavies (Greek: Στάβιες) is a small village in the southern part of Crete, Greece. This village is built at a height of 240 m above sea-level, on the south edge of the valley of Messara and is mentioned in the Archives of Chandax in 1370. It is possible that the name Stavies has its origin in the Italian name Stavia, a town destroyed in the eruption of Vesuvius in 79 AD. After the destruction of their village, refugees could have landed in Crete and built the present village.

It belongs to the municipality of Gortyna, former municipality of Kofinas, and nearby villages are Fournofarago, Dionysi and Vagionia. Its population approximates to 300 persons. The area is mainly agricultural and a large variety of high quality products are produced. Some of which are the famous Cretan olive oil and various products of grapes like wine, raisins, various types of vegetables (cabbages, lettuces, potatoes, pole beans etc.) and a local alcoholic drink named raki ("Ρακί").

In relation to its size, Stavies is one of the few villages in the area that has more than one olive oil factory.
