= Panaro (surname) =

Panaro is an Italian surname.

- Alessandra Panaro (1939–2019), Italian film actress
- Hugh Panaro (born 1964), American tenor singer
- Manuel Panaro (born 2002), Argentine footballer
- Nicola Panaro (born 1968), Italian camorrista
