= Apesokari =

Apesokari Απεσωκάρι
- Community
- Location within Greece
- Coordinates: 35°01′N 24°57′E
- Country: Greece
- Administrative region: Crete
- Regional unit: Heraklion
- Municipality: Gortyna

Population (2021)
  - Community: 76
- Time zone: UTC+2 (EET)
  - Summer (DST): UTC+3 (EEST)

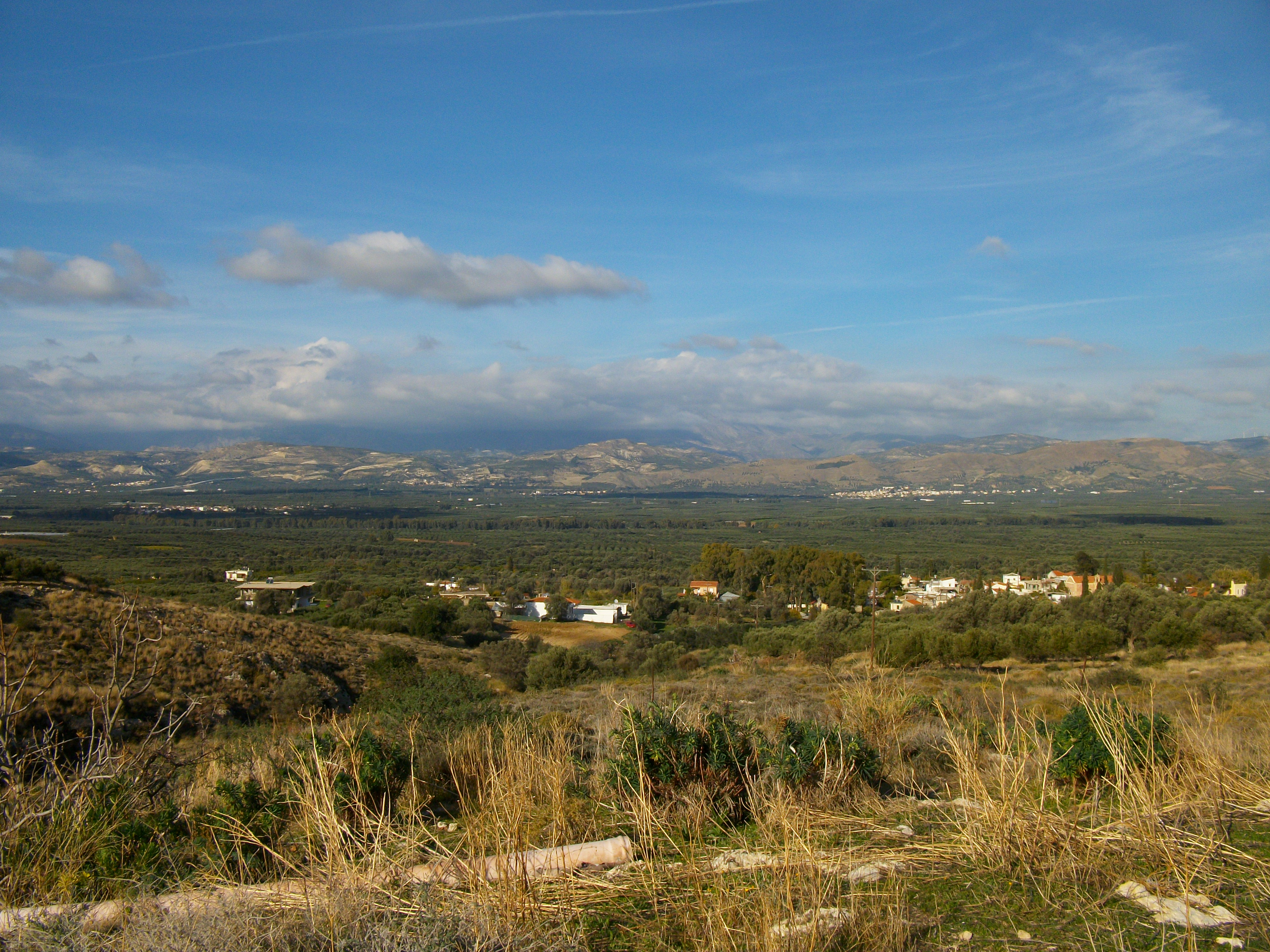
View over Apesokari village.

Apesokari (Greek: Απεσωκάρι) is the archaeological site of an ancient Minoan cemetery. It is also a modern village with a population of 76 (2021) and is built at 155 m above sea level. It is in the municipality of Gortyna in the south of Heraklion regional unit, Greece.

== Population ==
| Year | Population |
|---|---|
| 1981 | 156 |
| 1991 | 186 |
| 2001 | 131 |
| 2011 | 103 |
| 2021 | 76 |

== Archaeology ==
Two Early Minoan tholos tombs are located near the modern village. These tombs connected the Apesokari people with their ancestors and allowed them to keep connection with the dead. Smashed vessels and remnants of cups reflect the Minoans' value of unity and community. The rituals at Apesokari's tombs reveal toasting and banquets at burial, a popular Bronze Age tradition.

The structure of their tombs indicated that the culture was relatively egalitarian during the Early Minoan period. The circular setting of the Tholos tombs placed the dead in non-hierarchical patterns. Most burial tombs built around the same time frame were rectangular. The tribes would often replace old bones and rebury them outside of the Tholos tomb in order to lay the freshly dead to rest.

Tholos Tomb B is notable for the fact that burials did not only take place inside the tholos tomb, but also took place in some of the outer rooms which join the tholos tomb as well. It also had a cult room with a wooden pillar on a stone base. A small bench altar was built in a niche to the right of the entrance. A cult image, formed from natural rock, was found on this altar. There was also a large altar outside, surrounded by a paved area.

Apesokari was first excavated in 1942 by the Wehrmacht "Art Protection Unit" during the German occupation. In this first excavation, a small tholos tomb, a cult room and an outdoor altar were excavated. Tholos Tomb A was found partially looted but a few stone vessels and clay pots were restored and collected.

== See also ==
- List of settlements in the Heraklion regional unit
