= Minoa Pediada =

Municipality in Crete, Greece

Minoa Pediada Μινώα Πεδιάδα
- Municipality
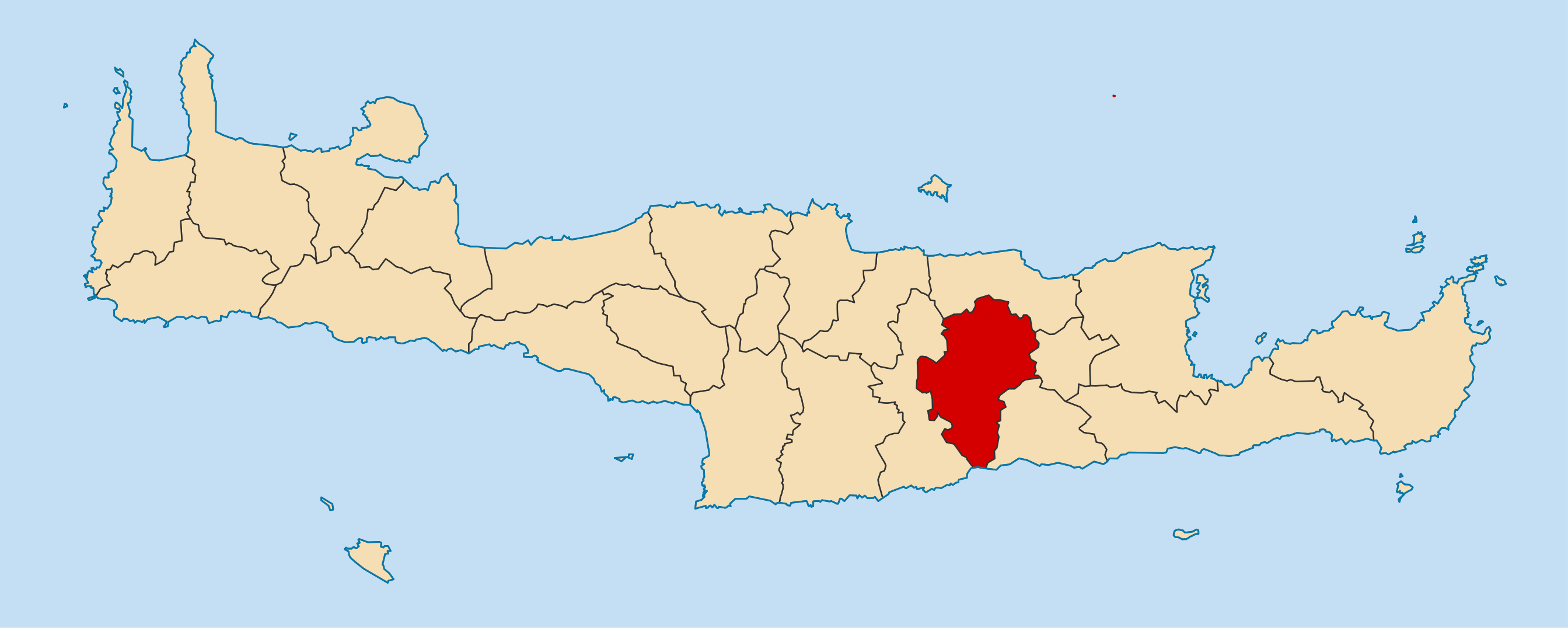

- Location within Greece
- Coordinates: 35°12′N 25°21′E
- Country: Greece
- Administrative region: Crete
- Regional unit: Heraklion
- Seat: Evangelismos

Area
  - Municipality: 398.2 km^{2} (153.7 sq mi)

Population (2021)
  - Municipality: 14,165
  - Density: 35.57/km^{2} (92.13/sq mi)
- Time zone: UTC+2 (EET)
  - Summer (DST): UTC+3 (EEST)

Minoa Pediada (Greek: Μινώα Πεδιάδα, "Minoan Plain") is a municipality in the Heraklion regional unit of Crete, Greece. It covers an area of 398.206 km^{2} (153.748 sq mi) and has a population of 14,165 according to the 2021 census. The seat of the municipality is the village of Evangelismos.

== Municipality ==
The municipality Minoa Pediada was formed at the 2011 local government reform by the merger of the following 3 former municipalities, that became municipal units:

- Arkalochori
- Kastelli
- Thrapsano
