= Episkopi, Heraklion =

Episkopi Επισκοπή
- Municipal unit
- Location within the regional unit

- Location within Greece
- Coordinates: 35°16′N 25°15′E
- Country: Greece
- Administrative region: Crete
- Regional unit: Heraklion
- Municipality: Hersonissos

Area
  - Municipal unit: 45.5 km^{2} (17.6 sq mi)
- Elevation: 330 m (1,080 ft)

Population (2021)
  - Municipal unit: 2,291
  - Municipal unit density: 50.4/km^{2} (130/sq mi)
  - Community: 1,214
- Time zone: UTC+2 (EET)
  - Summer (DST): UTC+3 (EEST)
- Postal code: 70008
- Area code: 2810

Episkopi (Greek: Επισκοπή) is a former municipality in the Heraklion regional unit, Crete, Greece. Since the 2011 local government reform, it has been part of the municipality Hersonissos, of which it is a municipal unit. The municipal unit has an area of 45.500 km^{2} (17.568 sq mi). The population of Episkopi as of 2021 is 2,291.

== Main Villages in Municipal Unit of Episkopi ==
=== Aitania Village ===
Aitania village is located on a hill west of Episkopi village, in the inland of Hersonissos Municipality, and on the east of Karteros Potamos Valley with a northern view to the sea, at an altitude of 255m. The population is approximately 319 inhabitants. Its churches and the landscape of the valley of Karteros Potamos make it a destination for tourists. There are traditional cafes in the cobblestoned square of the village where orange trees, mulberry, oleanders and pomegranates grow. Churches include Agios Ioannis, Genesis of Theotokou and Agia Paraskeuh, all three of them dating to the 13th century.

=== Episkopi Village ===
Episkopi village is located 18 km southeast of Heraklion city and 8.5 km south of Kokkini Chani village, in the inland of Hersonissos Municipality. The village has been inhabited since the Minoan era . The local population is involved in agriculture and animal productions, such as olive oil and dairy products. Venetian monuments in the area include ‘‘the Tower’’, and churches from the Byzantine era, such as Agios Ioannis and Agia Paraskeui church that are decorated with frescoes. In the village is located the Argirakio Ethnological and War Museum that was founded by Michael Argirakis, presenting military, ethnological, and historical exhibits.

=== Galifa Village ===
Galifa village is located 25 km southeast of Heraklion city, built on a flat spot on the hilltop next to Armeno hill and Kefalopoulo hill, in the inland of Hersonissos Municipality. The village has views of surrounding landscape, mountains and a countryside with olive trees, aspalathous, faskomilies and prinous. The history of Galifa village starts in the Minoan era, proven by the ancient findings in the area. The village is known for its contribution of freedom fighters to every Greek liberation struggle and war as well as for the atrocities that German and Turkish occupants committed here. The local hospitality and their occupation in the agricultural and animal rearing sector, creates food products.

=== Galipe Village ===
Galipe village is located 21 km southeast of Heraklion city and 5 km from Gournes village, at an altitude of 280m the inland of Hersonissos Municipality. The village is built on a hill, with views especially on its north side. The square of the village is cobblestone paved and in the middle a small fountain, decorated with 4 stone statues of little lions. A number of ornamental plants and trees provide shade during the summer. The church of Koimishs of Theotokou was built in the 14th century and is decorated with frescoes. During the summer a number of events take place in the village and in its area, including one on 15 August, where locals and visitors, after a church ceremony, celebrate with traditional food, drinks, music and dance.

=== Kainourgio Chorio Village ===
Kainourgio Chorio village is located 18.5 km southeast of Heraklion city, and 4.8 km from Gournes village, at an altitude of 220 m in the inland of Hersonissos Municipality. It is a small settlement with experience in wine making, dating to the 16th century. Nowadays, local villagers are in agricultural production, producing wine and olive oil. In the square of the village there is a small fountain, and a bit further away stands the church of Panagia where the religious tradition of burning Judas take place at Easter. In the village the Wine Museum, exhibits traditional textiles, loom and a cellar with different kinds of wine. Other exhibits include facilities and machinery from the Venetian age. The Foscolo Tower and the Agia Anastasia church is built in a rock.

=== Sgourokefali Village ===
Sgourokefali village is located 18 km southeast of Heraklion city and 10 km from Gournes village, the inland of Hersonissos Municipality, at an altitude of 330 m. In the village, there is the church of Agia Triada, and frescoes decorate its inside and date to the middle 18th century. There is also a square in the village in which the Hrwo monument stands, a historical monument which honours WW2 heroes. Made of marble, the monument is dominated by a stone eagle. The fountain of the village is made of stone and decorated with ornamental plants. Just outside the village is the Gorge of Karteros. The gorge has a number of ponds and waterfalls along its route. During the summer time and 50 days exactly from the celebration of Easter, a celebration takes place in honour of Agia Triada, with a religious ceremony followed by the gathering in the square of the village.

=== Skopela Village ===
Skopela village is located 6.5 km south of Gournes village and 18 km southeast of Heraklion city, inland of Hersonissos Municipality, at an altitude of 280 m. The village square is decorated with flowers and trees that offer shade during the summer. In the middle of the square is a renovated well, which provided the water for the inhabitants. Agioi Pantes church, decorated by the Vrefokratousas and Pantokratoros frescoes is dated to the start of 19th century.

=== Stamnoi Village ===
Stamnoi village is located 17 km southeast of Heraklion city and 7 km from Gournes village by the sea, in the inland of Hersonissos Municipality and at an altitude of 290 m. The local residents produce olive oil, wine, grapes and raisins. There is a tower in the middle of the village, a two storied building with loopholes at its top. It is known to be the tower of a Venetian feudal lord of the area and in its yard is a triangle. The village square is decorated with mantels and ornamental plants and also with the Hrwo monument that was built in honours of the local war heroes, and it’s made of marble. During the summer time a number of events take place in the village, including on August 15 to celebrate the Panagia, the Virgin Mary, when locals and visitors come for a feast with traditional food, drinks, music and dancing.

== Other notable attractions ==
=== Argirakeio Ethnological War Museum ===
Argirakio Ethnological War Museum is located in the Municipal Unit of Episkopi, and houses a WW2 collection of the war spoils of its founder, Argirakis Michael. Its purpose is to 'rescue, preserve, exhibit and display objects of folklore and ethnological character'. It houses military WW2 items as well as documents and photographs.
