= Kofinas =

Kofinas Κόφινας
- Municipal unit
- Location within the regional unit

- Location within Greece
- Coordinates: 35°00′N 25°04′E
- Country: Greece
- Administrative region: Crete
- Regional unit: Heraklion
- Municipality: Gortyn

Area
  - Municipal unit: 144.8 km^{2} (55.9 sq mi)

Population (2021)
  - Municipal unit: 4,076
  - Municipal unit density: 28.15/km^{2} (72.91/sq mi)
- Time zone: UTC+2 (EET)
  - Summer (DST): UTC+3 (EEST)

Kofinas (Greek: Κόφινας) is a former municipality in the Heraklion regional unit, Crete, Greece. Since the 2011 local government reform it is part of the municipality Gortyn, of which it is a municipal unit. The municipal unit has an area of 144.768 km^{2} (55.895 sq mi). Population 4,076 (2021). The seat of the municipality was in Asimi.

== Twin town ==
- Marano sul Panaro, Italy
