= Gouves, Greece =

Village in Crete, Greece

Goúves Γούβες
- Municipal unit
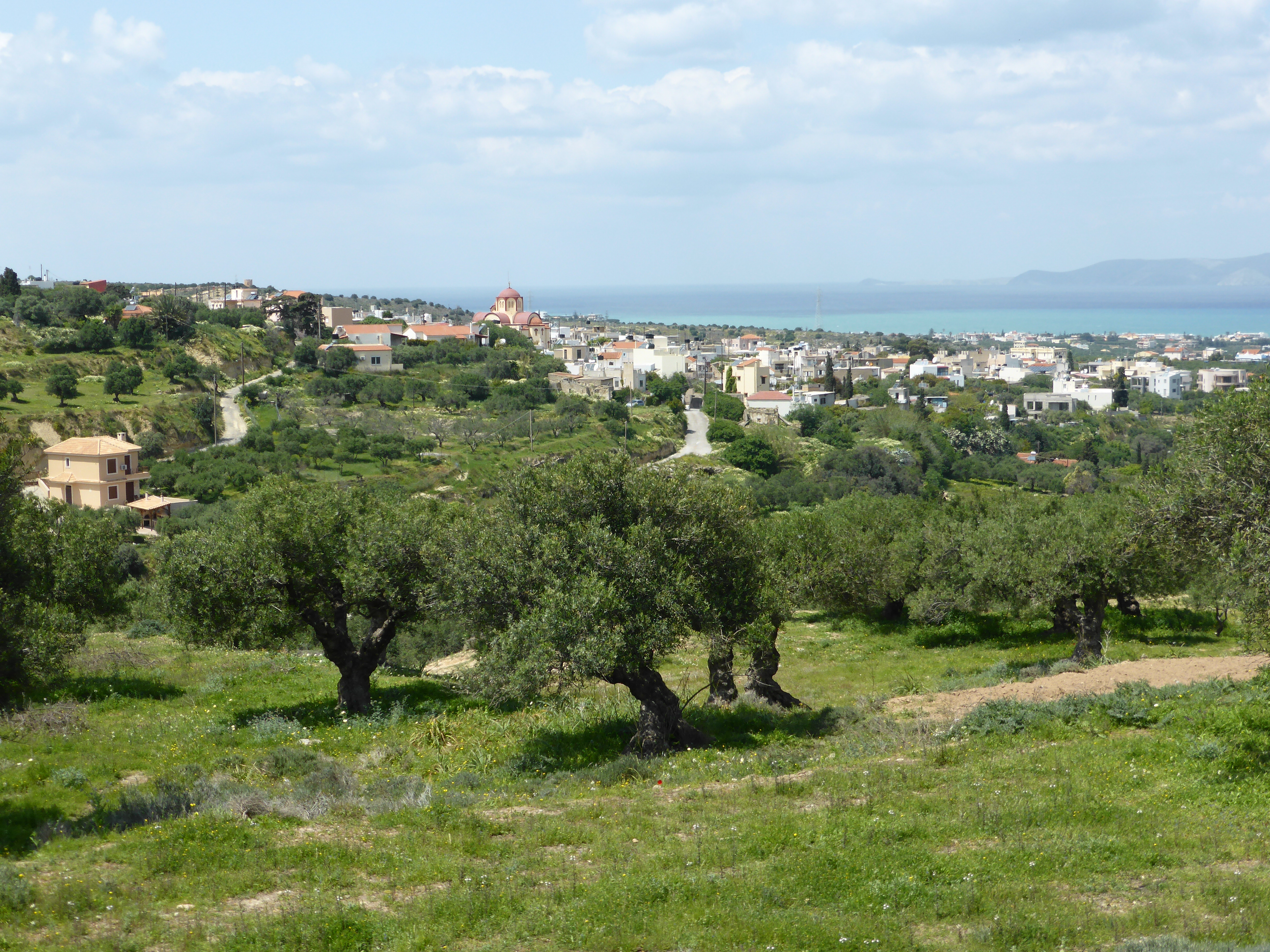
- View of Gouves

- Location within the regional unit

- Location within Greece
- Coordinates: 35°18′48″N 25°18′48″E
- Country: Greece
- Administrative region: Crete
- Regional unit: Heraklion
- Municipality: Hersonissos

Area
  - Municipal unit: 95.0 km^{2} (36.7 sq mi)

Population (2021)
  - Municipal unit: 12,095
  - Municipal unit density: 127/km^{2} (330/sq mi)
  - Community: 3,487
- Time zone: UTC+2 (EET)
  - Summer (DST): UTC+3 (EEST)
- Postal code: 70014

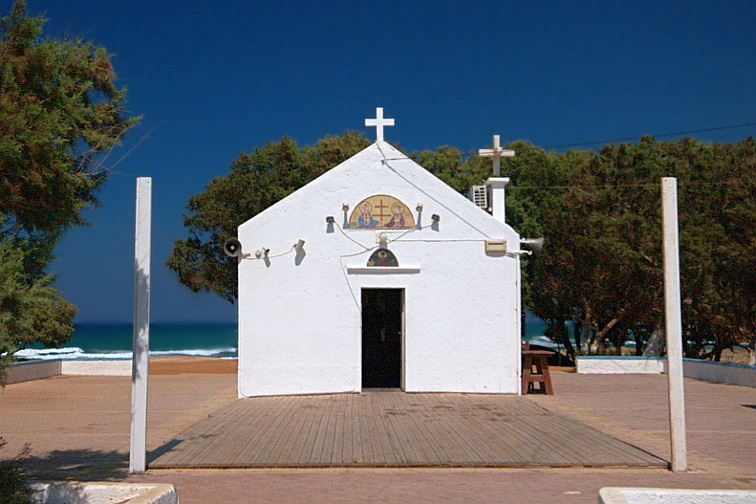
Church in Kátó Goúves by the sea

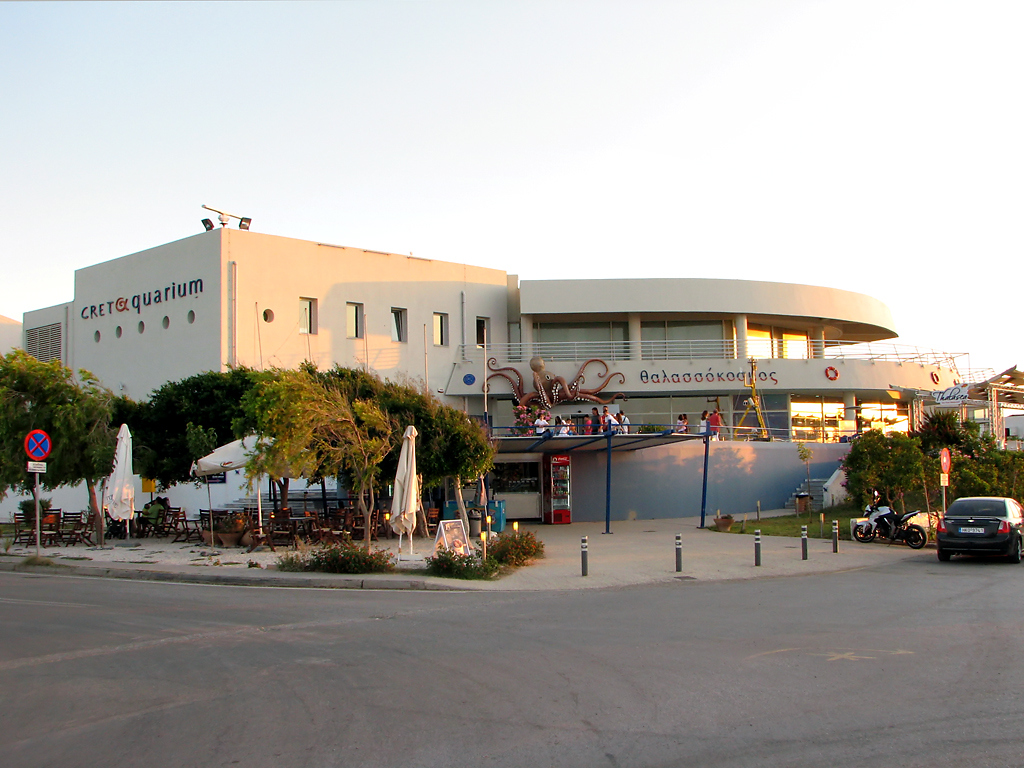
CretAquarium

Goúves (Greek: Γούβες) is a village and former municipality in the Heraklion regional unit, Crete, Greece. Since the 2011 local government reform it has been part of the municipality of Hersonissos, of which it is a municipal unit. The municipal unit has an area of 94.963 km^{2} (36.665 sq mi). It lies about 9 mi (14 km) east of Heraklion.

The municipal unit includes the coastal settlement of Káto Goúves, about 1.9 km (1.2 mi) north of the village, which has long sandy beaches and extensive tourist infrastructure. The surrounding area also contains traditional villages, archaeological sites and the Eileithyia Cave.

To the west of Goúves are the coastal settlements of Kokkini Hani (also spelled Háni Kokkíni) and Amnísos, and to the east lies the large resort town of Hersonissos.

== Villages in the municipal unit of Gouves ==
Villages in the area include:

- Anopoli – several minutes from Kokkini Hani village, and 5 km south in the mountains at an altitude of 205 m.
- Elia – located 12 km southeast of Heraklion city, in the inland of Hersonissos municipality, and about 4.5 km from Kokkini Hani village by the sea. The village stands on a small hill, at an altitude of 230 m.
- Epano Gouves – located on the south side of Gouves village by the north side of Ederi Mountain, about 18 km east of Heraklion city and about 3 km from Gournes village.
- Epano Vatheia – located in the valley of Vatheianos Kampos, at an altitude of 260 m in the inland of Hersonissos municipality, about 15 km southeast of Heraklion city.
- Gournes – a coastal village located about 15 km east of Heraklion city in the municipality of Hersonissos.
- Gouves village – administrative centre of the area; the coastal settlement of Kato Gouves lies to the north.
- Charasso – located southeast of Heraklion city, about 27 km from the airport and at an altitude of 388 m, in the inland of Hersonissos municipality about 10 km south of Gouves village.
- Kalo Chorio – located about 7 km south of Gouves village and 25 km southeast of Heraklion city.
- Karteros – coastal village about 8 km from Heraklion city and the natural limit of Hersonissos municipality.
- Kato Vatheia – located between Vatheianos Kampos and Epano Vatheia.
- Kokkini Chani – a coastal village about 12 km from Heraklion city.
- Koksari – located 23 km southeast of Heraklion city and about 5 km from Gouves village.
- Skoteino – located south of Gouves village.
- Vatheianos Kampos – located 13 km east of Heraklion city and bordering Kokkini Chani village.

== Points of interest in the municipal unit of Gouves ==
=== Amnisos ===
Amnísos lies about 7 km east of Heraklion city, next to the airport and opposite the islet of Dia. A Minoan villa dating from about 1600 BC has been excavated in the area, where frescoes now housed in the Heraklion Archaeological Museum were found.

=== CretAquarium ===
CretAquarium is a large state owned public aquarium that forms part of the Hellenic Centre for Marine Research (HCMR). It is located on the northwestern part of the former American base at Gournes, where together with HCMR’s research facilities it forms "Thalassokosmos", a centre for marine science and public presentation of the Mediterranean marine environment.

=== Dia island ===
Dia island is located about 6 mi northeast of Heraklion city. It is uninhabited and supports seabirds and species associated with coastal cliffs. It is one of the Natura protected areas, due to its role as a habitat for endemic plants.

=== Eileithyia Cave ===
This cave lies 1 km inland from Amnísos. It was an important sanctuary from Neolithic times onwards. It was dedicated to Eileithyia, a Greek goddess of fertility and childbirth of Cretan origin. The cave is rectangular, 64 m long and 9–12 m wide. After the entrance there is an antechamber leading to a rectangular room surrounded by cylindrical stalagmites which were probably used in worship. At the cave's mouth there is a square known as "the Square of Altars", which may have been used for ceremonies. The cave remained in use until late Roman times.

=== Gorge of Karteros ===
The Gorge of Karteros, also known as Astrakiano Faragi, is located in the municipal unit of Gouves and can be entered at Karteros village on the southeast side. It is a hiking route with ponds and small waterfalls.

=== Kera Eleousa Monastery ===
The monastery of Kera Eleousa is located in the municipal unit of Gouves, near Voritsi village and a short distance from Gouves village. It is a fortress-type monastery with significant archaeological remains, founded in the late 16th century. The complex includes the church, the monks' cells and an enclosed courtyard.

=== Minoan villa of Kokkíni Háni ===
The coastal settlement of Kokkíni Háni lies in Vathiano Kambo, about 13 km east of Heraklion and northwest of Goúves. At the site known as Nirou Háni, archaeologists have excavated a well-preserved Minoan villa dating from the New Palace period. The villa had two storeys, covered about 1,000 m² and had typical features of Minoan architecture such as paved courts, corridors, storage rooms, light wells and shrines. About 40 tripods and large double axes were found in some rooms, suggesting that the owner of the villa may have been a high priest. Like many Minoan buildings, the villa was destroyed by fire. Finds from the excavations are displayed in the Heraklion Archaeological Museum.

=== Monastery of Saint John the Theologian ===
The monastery of Saint John the Theologian (Agios Ioannis Theologos in Greek) lies in a verdant setting southeast of the village of Anópoli. It used to be part of the Saint George (Agios Giorgios) monastery to its north, which was abandoned following pirate raids in the 15th and 16th centuries, leading monks to move to the monastery of Saint John. During the Cretan revolution of 1866–1869, the monks joined the rebels and left the monastery; on their return they found it looted. During the Ottoman occupation of Crete, the monastery was burnt on 27 July 1896 and the monks were killed. The monastery remained uninhabited for eight years until it was re-established. In 1904, the monk Callinicos Daskalakis returned to Anopolis from Agarathos and, together with other monks, re-organised the monastery. Since then, the monastery has remained in operation.

The monastery's catholicon is not built in the centre but on its northwest side, unlike many other fort-like monasteries. It is a single-nave, barrel-vaulted church and contains a mosaic floor. On the north side there are three tombs belonging to Archimandrite Gregory Aspetakis, Archimandrite Timotheos Papadakis and the monk Ioakeim Avgerinakis. The monastery contains a painting by Antonios Alaxandridis and remains of an olive-oil press west of the catholicon. The first school in the area operated in the monastery after 1840 on the site of the olive-oil press.

=== Skotino Cave ===
This cave, one of the largest of the many caves in Crete, is located on a hill northwest of the village of Skotinó, a few kilometres inland south of Goúves. It is also known as the Ayía Paraskeví cave, a name deriving from the church built above it. The cave is 160 m deep and 36 m wide. The first archaeological investigations were carried out by Arthur Evans, the British archaeologist who excavated and partially restored Knossos in the early 20th century. Further exploration by French and Greek archaeologists in the 1960s revealed bronze and ceramic votive offerings, the earliest dating from the earliest Minoan periods, suggesting that the cave was an important sacred site dedicated to a female fertility deity, possibly Britomartis. The cave remained in use in Classical Greek and Roman times, when the fertility goddess Artemis or her Roman equivalent Diana replaced the earlier Minoan deity.

== Gallery ==
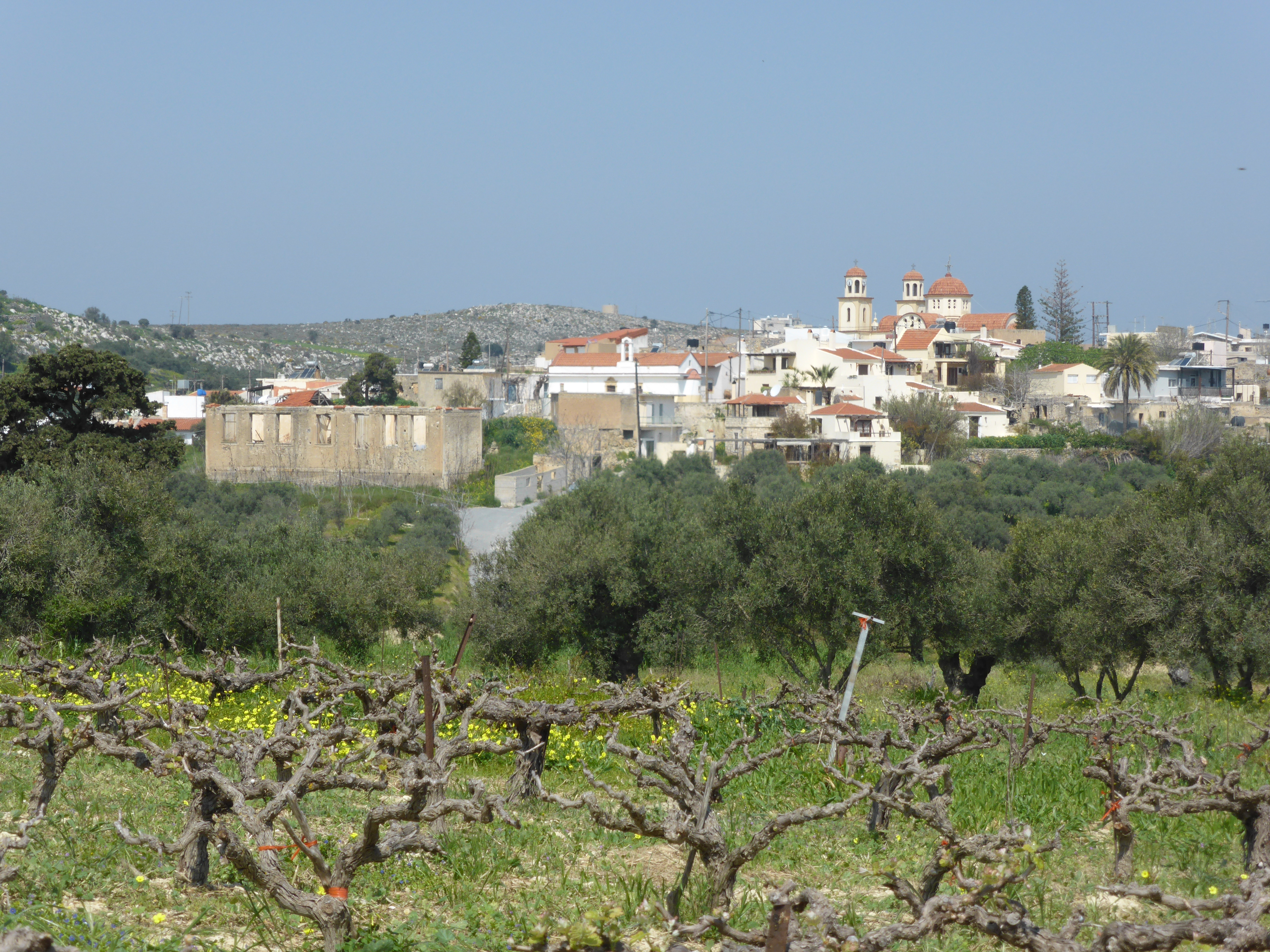
Anopoli village from the south

== Bibliography ==
- Fisher, John and Garvey, Geoff (2007). The Rough Guide to Crete, 7th edition.
