= Kingdom of Candia =

Crete under Venetian rule

Coordinates: 35°19′N 25°08′E

Kingdom of Candia Regno di Candia (Italian) Regno de Càndia (Venetian) Βασίλειο της Κάντιας (Greek)
- 1205–1715
- Flag Coat of arms

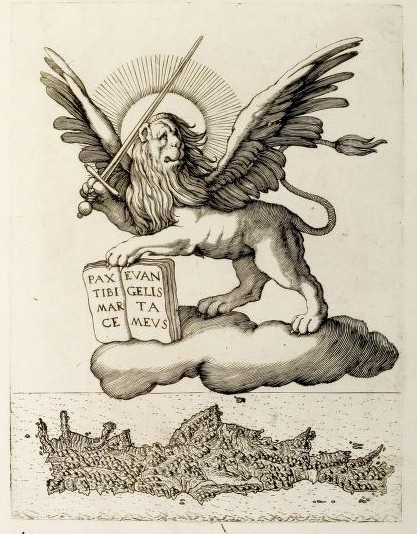
- The Lion of Saint Mark, symbol of the Republic of Venice, standing guard over a map of Crete
- Capital: Candia
- Common languages: Greek (Cretan Greek); Italian; Venetian; Latin
- Religion: Roman Catholicism
- Government: Venetian Colonial Government
- Duke of Crete
  - 1209–1214: Giacomo Tiepolo (first)
  - 1667: Girolamo Battagia (last)
- Historical era: Late Middle Ages and Renaissance
  - Fourth Crusade: 1204
  - Cession to Venice: 1205
  - Revolt of St. Titus: 1363–1368
  - Ottoman conquest of Cyprus: 1571
  - Ottoman conquest of Crete: 1669
  - Ottoman conquest of offshore Cretan isles: 1715
- Currency: Venetian coinage
Preceded by	Succeeded by
Byzantine Crete	Ottoman Crete
- Today part of: Greece

The Realm or Kingdom of Candia or Duchy of Candia was the official name of Crete during the island's period as an overseas territory of the Republic of Venice, from the initial Venetian conquest in 1205–1212 to its fall to the Ottoman Empire during the Cretan War (1645–1669). The island was at the time and up to the early modern era commonly known as Candia after its capital, Candia or Chandax (modern Heraklion). In modern Greek historiography, the period is known as the Venetocracy (Greek: Βενετοκρατία, romanized: Venetokratía, or Ενετοκρατία, Enetokratía).

The island of Crete had formed part of the Byzantine Empire until 1204, when the Fourth Crusade dissolved the empire and divided its territories amongst the crusader leaders (see Frankokratia). Crete was initially allotted to Boniface of Montferrat, but, unable to enforce his control over the island, he soon sold his rights to Venice. Venetian troops first occupied the island in 1205, but it took until 1212 for it to be secured, especially against the opposition of Venice's rival Genoa. Thereafter, the new colony took shape: the island was divided into six provinces (sestieri) named after the divisions of the city of Venice itself, while the capital Candia was directly subjected to the Commune Veneciarum. The islands of Tinos and Cythera, also under Venetian control, came under the kingdom's purview. In the early 14th century, this division was replaced by four provinces, almost identical to the four modern prefectures.

During the first two centuries of Venetian rule, revolts by the native Orthodox Greek population against the Roman Catholic Venetians were frequent, often supported by the Empire of Nicaea. Fourteen revolts are counted between 1207 and the last major uprising, the Revolt of St. Titus in the 1360s, which united the Greeks and the Venetian coloni against the financial exactions of the metropolis. Thereafter, and despite occasional revolts and Turkish raids, the island largely prospered, and Venetian rule opened up a window into the ongoing Italian Renaissance. As a consequence, an artistic and literary revival unparalleled elsewhere in the Greek world took place: the Cretan School of painting, which culminated in the works of El Greco, united Italian and Byzantine forms, and a widespread literature using the local idiom emerged, culminating with the early 17th-century romances Erotokritos and Erophile.

After the Ottoman conquest of Cyprus in 1571, Crete was Venice's last major overseas possession. The Republic's relative military weakness, coupled with the island's wealth and its strategic location controlling the waterways of the Eastern Mediterranean attracted the attention of the Ottoman Empire. In the long and devastating Cretan War (1645–1669), the two states fought over the possession of Crete: the Ottomans quickly overran most of the island, but failed to take Candia, which held out, aided by Venetian naval superiority and Ottoman distractions elsewhere, until 1669. Only the three island fortresses of Souda, Gramvousa and Spinalonga remained in Venetian hands. Attempts to recover Candia during the Morean War failed, and these last Venetian outposts were finally taken by the Turks in 1715, during the last Ottoman–Venetian War.

== History ==
=== Establishment ===
==== Venetian conquest of Crete ====
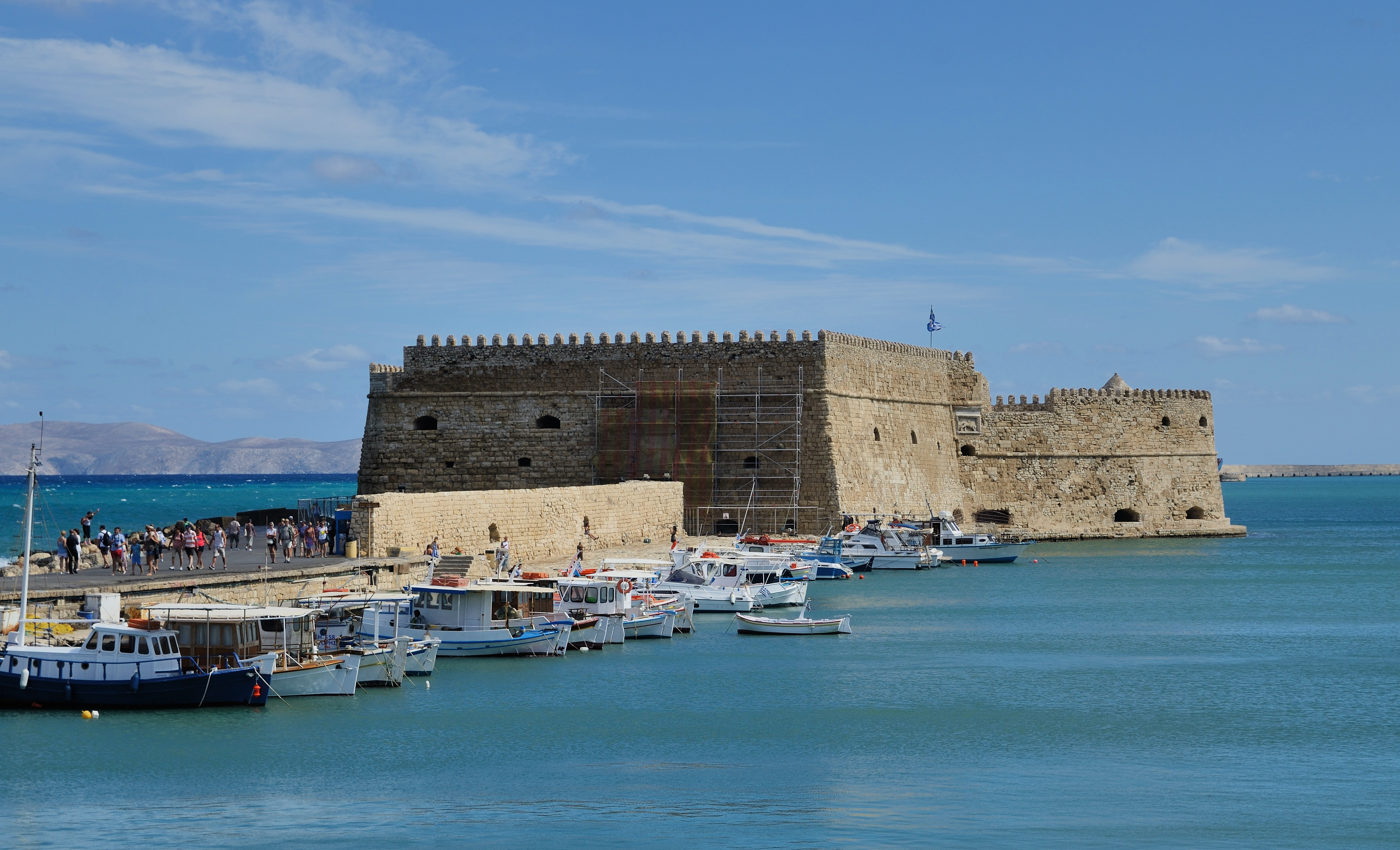
Venetian Rocca al Mare fortress in Heraklion

Venice had a long history of trade contact with Crete; the island was one of the numerous cities and islands throughout Greece where the Venetians had enjoyed tax-exempted trade by virtue of repeated chrysobulls granted by the Byzantine emperors, beginning in 1147 (and in turn codifying a practice dating to c. 1130) and confirmed as late as 1198 in a treaty with Emperor Alexios III Angelos. These same locations were largely allocated to the Republic of Venice in the partition of the Byzantine Empire that followed the capture of Constantinople by the Fourth Crusade, in April 1204: in addition to the Ionian Islands, the Saronic Gulf islands and the Cyclades, she obtained several coastal outposts on the Greek mainland of interest as bases for her maritime commerce. Finally, on 12 August 1204, the Venetians preempted their traditional rivals, the Genoese, to acquire Crete from Boniface of Montferrat. Boniface had allegedly been promised the island by the Byzantine emperor Alexios IV Angelos, but as he had little use for it, he sold it in exchange for 1,000 silver marks, an annual portion of the island's revenues totalling 10,000 hyperpyra, and the promise of Venetian support for his acquisition of the Kingdom of Thessalonica.

To enforce their claim, the Venetians landed a small force on the offshore island of Spinalonga. The Genoese however, who already had a trading colony on Crete, moved more quickly: under the command of Enrico Pescatore, Count of Malta, and enjoying the support of the local populace, they soon became masters over the eastern and central portions of the island. A first Venetian attack in summer 1207 under Ranieri Dandolo and Ruggiero Premarino was driven off, and for the next two years, Pescatore ruled the entire island with the exception of a few isolated Venetian garrisons. Pescatore even appealed to the Pope, and attempted to have himself confirmed as the island's king. However, while Venice was determined to capture the island, Pescatore was largely left unsupported by Genoa. In 1209, the Venetians managed to capture Palaiokastro near Candia (Greek Chandax, Χάνδαξ; modern Heraklion, Ηράκλειον), but it took them until 1212 to evict Pescatore from the island, and the latter's lieutenant, Alamanno da Costa, held out even longer. Only on 11 May 1217 did the war with Genoa end in a treaty that left Crete securely in Venetian hands.

==== Organization of the Venetian colony ====
Giacomo Tiepolo became the first governor of the new province, with the title of "duke of Crete" (duca di Candia), based in Candia. To strengthen Venetian control over Crete, Tiepolo suggested the dispatch of colonists from the metropolis; the Venetian colonists would receive land, and in exchange provide military service. The suggestion was approved, and the relevant charter, the Carta Concessionis, proclaimed on 10 September 1211 at Venice. 132 nobles, who were to serve as knights (milites or cavaleri) and 45 burghers (pedites, sergentes) participated in the first colonization wave that left Venice on 20 March 1212.

Three more waves of colonists were sent, in 1222, 1233, and 1252, and immigration continued in a more irregular fashion in later years as well. In total, about 10,000 Venetians are estimated to have moved to Crete during the first century of Venetian rule—by comparison, Venice itself had a population of c. 60,000 at this period. The colonization wave of 1252 also resulted in the establishment of Canea (modern Chania), on the site of the long abandoned ancient city of Kydonia. Venetians used Crete as a center for their profitable eastern trade. Candia was an important base for the traffic of the Balkan slave trade, during which the Venetians transported slaves from the Balkans across the Adriatic Sea to Chios or Candia in the Aegean Sea, from which they were sold on to either slavery in Spain in the West or slavery in Egypt in the South.

Furthermore, they established a feudal state and administered a strict capitalist system for exploiting the island's agricultural produce. Exported products consisted primarily of wheat and sweet wine (malmsey), and to a lesser extent of timber and cheese.

=== Age of the Cretan rebellions, 13th–14th centuries ===
Venetian rule over Crete proved troubled from the beginning, as it encountered the hostility of the local populace. In the words of the medievalist Kenneth Setton, it required "an unceasing vigilance and a large investment in men and money to hold on to the island". No fewer than 27 large and small uprisings or conspiracies are documented during Venetian rule. Although the local Greeks, both the noble families and the wider populace, were allowed to keep their own law and property, they resented Latin rule and the strict discrimination between them and the Latin Venetian elite, which monopolized the higher administrative and military posts of the island and reaped most of the benefits of the commerce passing through it. During the early period of Venetian rule, the Venetian colonists consciously maintained themselves apart; until the end of the 13th century, even mixed marriages between native Cretans and Venetians were prohibited.

==== First uprisings ====
Already in 1212, the Hagiostephanites brothers rose in revolt in the Lasithi Plateau, possibly caused by the arrival of the first Venetian colonists, and the expropriation of the Cretan nobles and the Orthodox Church on the island. The rebellion soon spread throughout the eastern part of Crete, capturing the forts of Sitia and Spinalonga, and was only suppressed through the intervention of Marco I Sanudo, the Duke of Naxos. Sanudo and Tiepolo then fell out, and Sanudo attempted to conquer the island for himself. Sanudo enjoyed considerable local support, including the powerful archon Sebastos Skordyles. He even seized Candia, while Tiepolo escaped to the nearby fortress of Temenos disguised as a woman. The arrival of a Venetian fleet allowed Tiepolo to recover the capital, and Sanudo agreed to evacuate the island in exchange for money and provisions; twenty Greek lords who had collaborated with him accompanied him to Naxos.

The failure of this first revolt did not reduce Cretan restiveness, however. In 1217, the theft of some horses and pasture land belonging to the Skordyles family by the Venetian rector of Monopari (Venetian Bonrepare), and the failure of the Duke of Crete, Paolo Querini, to provide redress, resulted in the outbreak of a major rebellion, led by the Greek nobles Constantine Skordyles and Michael Melissenos. Based in the two mountainous provinces of Upper Syvritos and Lower Syvritos, the rebels inflicted successive defeats on the Venetian troops, and the uprising soon spread across the entire western part of the island. As force proved unable to quell the rebellion, the Venetians resorted to negotiations. On 13 September 1219, the Duke of Crete, Domenico Delfino, and the rebel leaders concluded a treaty that gave the latter knightly fiefs and various privileges. 75 serfs were set free, the privileges of the metochi of the Monastery of Saint John the Theologian on Patmos were confirmed, and Venetian citizens became liable for punishment for crimes against the Cretan commoners (villani). In exchange, the Cretan nobles swore allegiance to the Republic of Venice. This treaty had major repercussions, as it began the formation of a native Cretan noble class, set on equal footing with the Venetian colonial aristocracy. However, the arrival of the second wave of Venetian colonists in 1222 again led to uprisings, under Theodore and Michael Melissenos. Once again, the Venetian authorities concluded a treaty with the rebel leaders, conceding them two knightly fiefs.

A new rebellion broke out in 1228, involving not only the Skordyloi and Melissenoi, but also the Arkoleos and Drakontopoulos families. Both sides requested external aid: the Duke of Crete, Giovanni Storlando, asked for the help of Angelo Sanudo, son and successor of Marco, while the Cretans looked to the Greek Empire of Nicaea for aid. A Nicaean fleet of 33 ships arrived on the island, and in the 1230s the Nicaeans were able to challenge Venetian control over much of Crete and maintain troops there. A series of treaties in 1233, 1234, and 1236, ended the uprising, with the concession of new privileges to the local nobility. Only the Drakontopouloi, along with the remnants of the Nicaean troops (the so-called "Anatolikoi") continued the fight, based on the fortress of Mirabello (modern Agios Nikolaos). It was only with the aid of the autonomous Greek lord of Rhodes, Leo Gabalas, that the Venetians were able to force their withdrawal to Asia Minor in 1236. The fate of the Drakontopouloi is unknown, and they are no longer attested thereafter.

==== Uprisings of the Chortatzes brothers ====
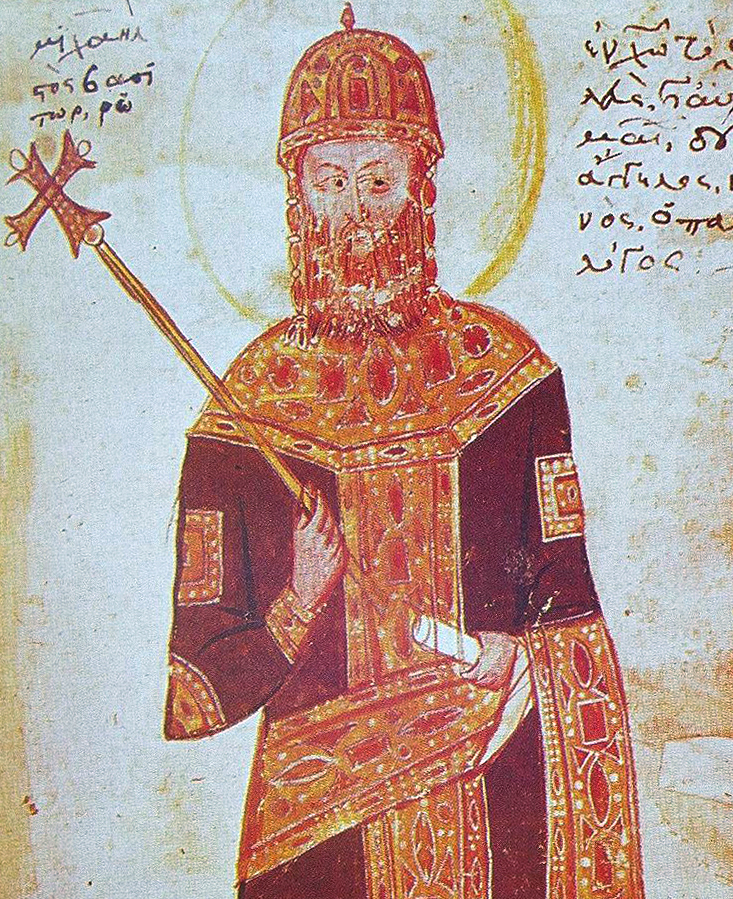
Emperor Michael VIII Palaiologos

Following the reconquest of Constantinople in 1261, and the restoration of the Byzantine Empire under the Palaiologos dynasty, Emperor Michael VIII Palaiologos endeavoured to recover Crete as well. A certain Sergios was sent to the island, and made contact with the Greek nobles Georgios Chortatzes and Michael Skordiles Psaromelingos. This led to the outbreak of another uprising in 1262, again led by the Skordilides, the Melissenoi, and the Chortatzes family, and supported by the Orthodox clergy. The rebellion raged for four years, but its prospects were never good; not only was Michael VIII unable to send any substantial aid, but the influential Greek noble Alexios Kallergis refused to support it, fearing the loss of his privileges. Finally, in 1265 another treaty ended the uprising, reconfirming the privileges of the Cretan nobles, awarding two more knightly fiefs to their leaders, and allowing the safe departure of Sergios from Crete. On the very next year, however, rumours spread that the Cretan nobles, including the Chortatzes brothers George and Theodore, but also Alexios Kallergis, were plotting another uprising. The dynamic intervention of the Duke Giovanni Velenio, and Kallergis' own misgivings, led to the failure of these plans. Michael VIII eventually recognised Venetian control of the island in treaties concluded in 1268 and 1277.

In 1272 or 1273, however, George and Theodore Chortatzes launched another uprising in eastern Crete, centred on the Lasithi Plateau. In 1276, the rebels scored a major victory in an open battle in the Messara Plain, in which the Duke of Crete, a ducal councillor, and the "flower of the Venetian colony of Candia" fell. The rebels laid siege to Candia, but on the verge of success, the rebellion began to fall apart due to dissensions among the Cretan nobles: the Psaromelingoi fell out with the Chortatzes clan after one of their own killed a Chortatzes over the division of the spoils, while at the same time Alexios Kallergis openly collaborated with the Venetians. With the arrival of substantial reinforcements from Venice, the uprising was finally defeated in 1278. Unlike with previous rebellions, the Venetians refused a negotiated settlement, and suppressed the revolt with a campaign of terror involving mass reprisals. The Chortatzes family and many of their supporters fled to Asia Minor, where several entered Byzantine service, but the brutal repression of the Venetians created an unbridgeable gulf with the local population.

==== Rebellion of Alexios Kallergis ====
Despite his double-dealing and shifting allegiance between Venice and his own compatriots, the defeat of the Chortatzes brothers left Alexios Kallergis as the most prominent and respected of the Cretan nobles. His enormous wealth, as well as his strategically situated fief at Mylopotamos, also gave him great power. This led the Venetians to distrust him; their efforts to curb his power backfired, however, and provoked the start of the largest and most violent of all Cretan rebellions up to that point, in 1282. It is also likely that this uprising too was secretly encouraged by Michael VIII Palaiologos as a distraction for the Venetians, who were allied with his arch-enemy Charles of Anjou.

Kallergis was joined by all the prominent families of the Cretan nobility: the Gabalades, Barouches, Vlastoi, and even by Michael Chortatzes, nephew of Theodore and George. The uprising quickly spread across the entire island. The Venetians tried to suppress it through reprisals: Orthodox monasteries, which were often used as bases and refuges by the rebels, were torched, and torture was applied to prisoners. In 1284, entry and settlement in the Lasithi Plateau, which in previous rebellions had served as a base for rebels, was declared completely prohibited, even for herding sheep. Despite the constant stream of reinforcements from the metropolis, the uprising could not be quelled. The Venetian authorities also tried to capture Kallergis and the other leaders, but without success. The situation became dire for Venice in 1296, following the outbreak of war with Genoa. The Genoese admiral Lamba Doria captured and torched Chania, and sent envoys to Kallergis offering an alliance, along with recognition as hereditary ruler of the island. Kallergis, however, refused. This act, together with the general war-weariness and the internal dissensions of the Cretan leaders, opened the path to ending the revolt and coming to terms with Venice.

==== Peace treaty and aftermath ====
The uprising was terminated with the "Peace of Alexios Kallergis" (Latin: Pax Alexii Callergi), signed on 28 April 1299 between Duke Michel Vitali and the rebel leaders. In 33 articles, the treaty proclaimed a general amnesty and the return of all confiscated possessions and the privileges formerly enjoyed by the rebel leaders, who were also granted a two-year tax exemption for the repayment of any debts accrued. The decisions of the tribunals that the rebels had established during the uprising were recognized, and the ban on mixed marriages between Cretans and Venetians was lifted. Kallergis himself was given extensive new privileges: an additional four knightly fiefs, the right of granting titles and fiefs himself, the right of keeping war horses, the right of leasing the properties of various monasteries, and the right of appointing an Orthodox bishop in the diocese of Arios (renamed as Kallergiopolis), and of renting the neighbouring bishoprics of Mylopotamos and Kalamonas.

The treaty left Kallergis as the virtual ruler of the Orthodox population of Crete; the contemporary chronicler Michael Louloudes, who fled to Crete when Ephesus fell to the Turks, calls him "Lord of Crete", and mentions him right after the Byzantine emperor, Andronikos II Palaiologos. Kallergis steadfastly honoured the terms of the treaty, and remained conspicuously loyal to Venice thereafter. His intervention prevented another revolt from breaking out in 1303, following the destructive earthquake of that year, that had left the Venetian authorities in disarray. Later, in 1311, a letter by the Duke of Crete requests of him to gather information about insurrectionist agitation in Sfakia. When another revolt broke out in Sfakia in 1319, Kallergis interceded with the rebels and Duke Giustiniani to put an end to it. On the same year, minor uprisings by the Vlastoi and Barouches were also ended after Kallergis' intervention. The Venetians rewarded him by inscribing his family into the Libro d'Oro of the Venetian nobility, but Kallergis' loyalty to Venice provoked the enmity of the other great Cretan families, who tried to assassinate him at Mylopotamos. Alexios Kallergis therefore spent his last years, until his death in 1321, in Candia. His enemies continued to try to assassinate him, but only managed to kill his son, Andreas, with many of his entourage.

==== Uprisings of 1333–1334 and 1341–1347 ====
The peace established by Kallergis lasted until 1333, when Duke Viago Zeno ordered additional taxes to finance the construction of additional galleys, to combat the ever-increasing threat of piracy and raiding along the Cretan coasts. The uprising began as a protest in Mylopotamos, but soon spread to the western provinces in September 1333, under the leadership of Vardas Kallergis, Nikolaos Prikosirides from Kissamos and the three Syropoulos brothers. Despite the participation of one of their relatives, the sons of Alexios Kallergis sided openly with the Venetians, as did other Cretans. The uprising was suppressed in 1334, and its leaders arrested and executed, with the crucial collaboration of Cretan commoners. The families of the rebels were exiled, but the brothers and children of Vardas Kallergis were condemned to life imprisonment as an example; and the entry of non-Cretan Orthodox clergy in the island was prohibited.

In 1341, another uprising was launched, by yet another member of the Kallergis family, Leon. A grandson or nephew of Alexios, Leon was publicly loyal to Venice, but conspired with other Cretan nobles, the Smyrilios family of Apokoronas. The revolt broke out there, and soon spread to other areas, as other noble families joined it, including the Skordilides (Konstantinos Skordiles was Leon Kallergis' father-in-law), Melissenoi, Psaromelingoi, and others. Alexios Kallergis' namesake grandson, however, again provided crucial assistance to the Venetians: he captured the Smyrilioi, who in turn betrayed Leon Kallergis, whom the Duke Andrea Cornaro threw alive into the sea, tied into a sack. Despite his loss, the revolt continued under the Skordilides and the Psaromelingoi, who had seized control of the mountains of Sfakia and Syvritos. The rebels even besieged the younger Alexios Kallergis at Kastelli. The rebels suffered a major defeat, however, when the Duke managed to ambush the Psaromelingoi and their forces and destroy them at the Messara Plain. The loss of the Psaromelingoi was the prelude to the suppression of the rebellion in 1347, which was again characterized by great brutality and the exile of the rebels' families to Venice.

==== Revolt of Saint Titus, 1363–1364 ====
Apart from the Greek nobles, dissatisfaction with the Republic was also growing among the Venetian feudal nobility in Crete, who resented both the heavy taxation and their relegation to a second rank against the nobility of the metropolis. This resentment came to the fore in 1363, when new taxes for repairs in the harbour of Candia were announced. In response, the Venetian feudal lords, led by the Gradenigo and Venier families, rose in rebellion on 9 August 1363. This "Revolt of Saint Titus", as it became known, abolished the Venetian authorities in Candia and declared the island an independent state, the "Republic of Saint Titus", after the island's patron saint. The rebels sought the assistance of the Greek population, promising equality between Catholics and Orthodox. Several Greek nobles joined them, including the Kallergis clan, and the revolt spread quickly to the rest of the island: in all major cities, the Venetian authorities were overthrown.

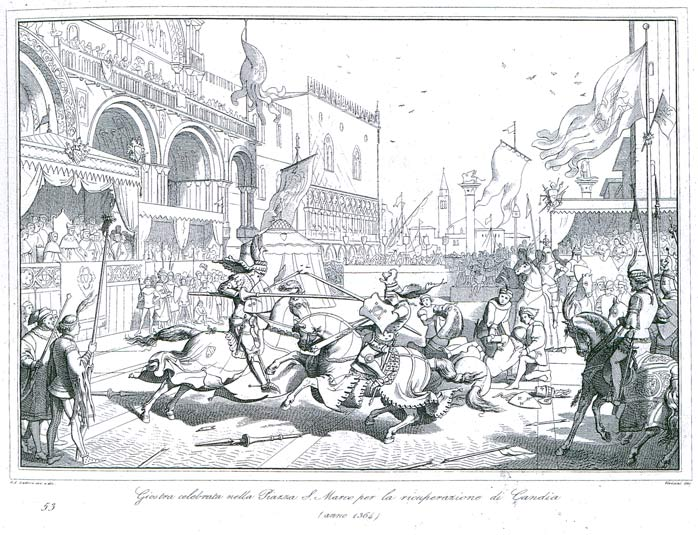
Illustration of a joust in the Piazza San Marco, celebrating the recovery of Candia, by Giuseppe Lorenzo Gatteri, 1863.

Venice tried to negotiate with the rebels, but after this effort failed, it began assembling a large expeditionary force to recover the island by force. The army was headed by the Veronese mercenary captain Lucino dal Verme and the fleet by Domenico Michiele. Once news of this arrived in Crete, many of the rebels began wavering. When the Venetian fleet arrived on 7 May 1364, resistance collapsed quickly. Candia surrendered on 9 May, and most of the other cities followed. Nevertheless, on strict orders from the Venetian government, the Venetian commanders launched a purge of the rebel leadership, including the execution and proscription of the ringleaders, and the disbandment of the Gradenigo and Venier families, who were banished from all Venetian territories. The feudal charter of 1211 was revoked, and all noble families obliged to swear an oath of allegiance to Venice. 10 May was declared a local holiday in Candia, and celebrated with extravagant festivals.

==== Rebellion of the Kallergis brothers, 1364–1367 ====
The quick restoration of Venetian control over the cities did not mean the end of violence on the island, as several proscribed members of the rebel leadership continued to oppose the Venetian authorities. Prominent among them were the three Kallergis brothers, John, George, and Alexios, as well as the brothers Tito and Teodorello Venier, Antonio and Francesco Gradenigo, Giovanni Molino, and Marco Vonale. These launched another uprising in August at Mylopotamos, which quickly spread throughout the western half of Crete. The aims of the rebels had now shifted towards liberating the island and seeking unification with the Byzantine Empire. The Byzantine emperor John V Palaiologos also appears to have supported this uprising, sending the Metropolitan of Athens Anthimos to the island as proedros (ecclesiastical locum tenens) of Crete.

Venice reacted by securing a declaration from the Pope granting absolution to any soldier fighting against the rebels, and engaging in extensive recruitment of mercenaries, including Turks. Nevertheless, the rebels managed to extend their reach into eastern Crete, with the Lasithi plateau once again becoming a base of operations for the rebels in their guerrilla warfare against the Venetian authorities. However, the famine of 1365 severely weakened the rebellion. The Venetian rebel leaders were captured through treason and tortured to death, with only Tito Venier escaping this fate by leaving the island. Hunger and fear forced the eastern part of the island to submit to Venice, but the rebellion continued in the west under the Kallergis brothers, based in the inaccessible mountains of Sfakia, until April 1367, when the Venetian provveditore Giustiniani managed to enter Sfakia and capture the Kallergis by treason. Venetian reprisals were extensive, leading to the virtual destruction of the native nobility. To further ensure that no other uprisings could take place, the mountainous areas of Mylopotamos, Lasithi, and Sfakia were evacuated and entrance into them prohibited for any purpose whatsoever. The Kallergis uprising was indeed to prove the last of the great Cretan rebellions against Venice: deprived of their natural leadership and naturally secure strongholds, and faced with the ever-increasing threat of Ottoman conquest, the Cretans, apart from some small-scale incidents, accommodated themselves to Venetian rule.

=== Under the shadow of Ottoman invasion: Crete in the 15th–17th centuries ===
The internal tranquility that followed the end of the large-scale uprisings led to considerable prosperity for the island, particularly during what the historian Freddy Thiriet labelled the "half-century of prosperity", 1400–1450.

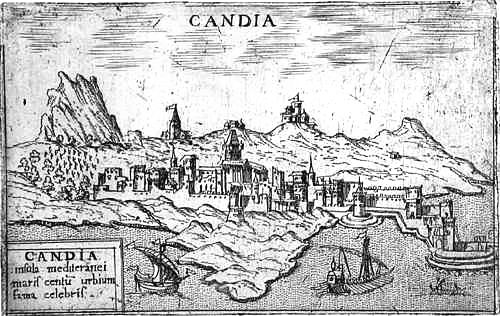
Engraving of Candia, 1595

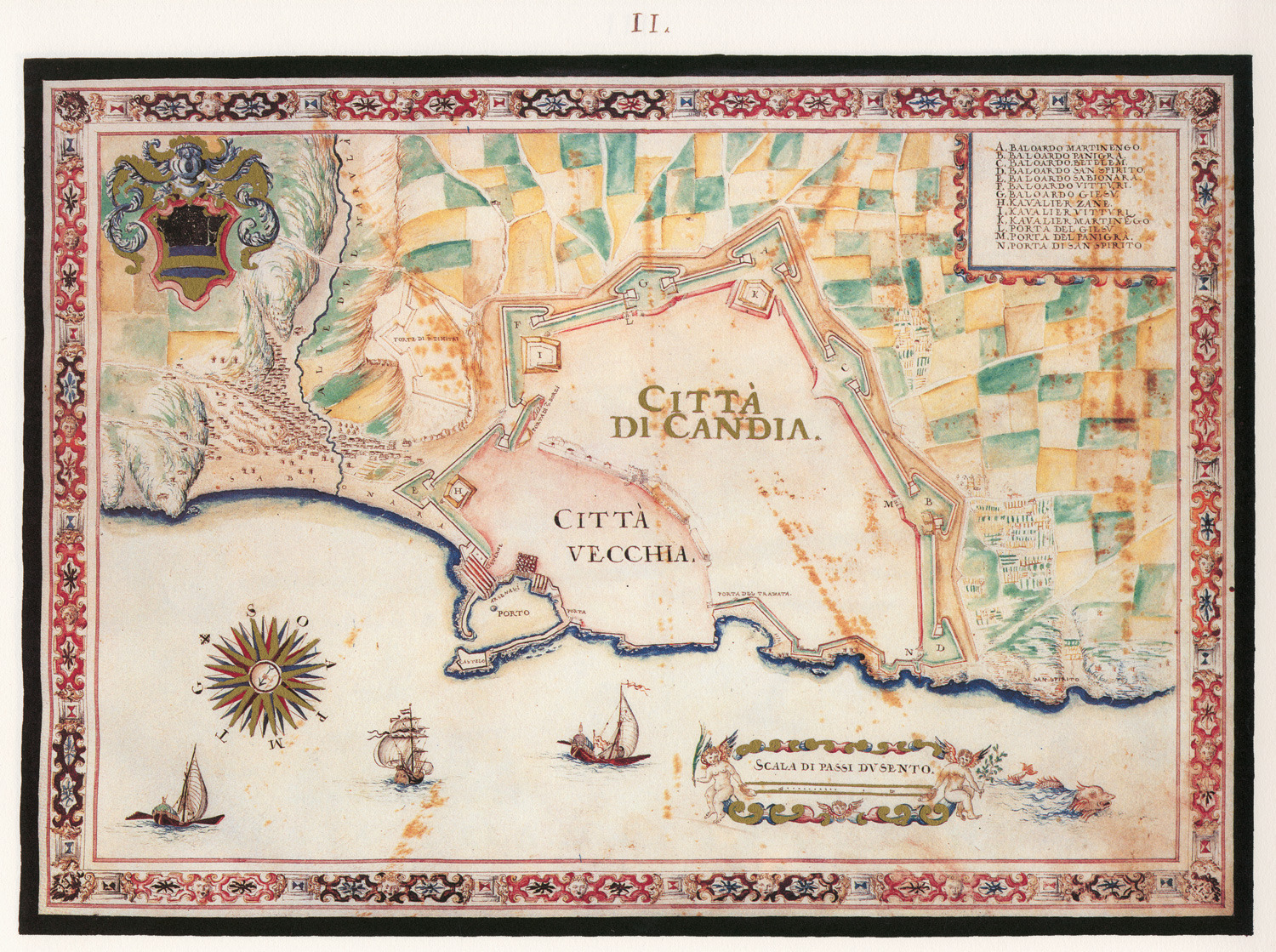
Candia and its fortifications, 1651

Crete had always been of particular importance among Venice's colonies, but its importance increased as the Ottomans started wresting away Venice's overseas possessions in a series of conflicts that began after the Fall of Constantinople in 1453. By the middle of the 16th century, Crete was the only major Venetian possession left in the Aegean, and following the loss of Cyprus in 1570–1571, in the entire Eastern Mediterranean. The emergence of the Ottoman threat coincided with a period of economic decline for the Venetian Republic, which hampered its ability to effectively strengthen Crete. In addition, internal strife on the island, and the local aristocracy's resistance to reforms, compounded the problem.

The Fall of Constantinople caused a deep impression among the Cretans, and in its aftermath, a series of anti-Venetian conspiracies took place. The first was the conspiracy of Sifis Vlastos in Rethymno, which even included a fake letter by the last Byzantine emperor, Constantine XI Palaiologos. The conspiracy was betrayed to the Venetian authorities by the priest Ioannis Limas and Andrea Nigro, in exchange for money and privileges. 39 individuals were charged with participation, among them many priests. In November 1454, as a retaliation, the authorities banned the ordination of Orthodox priests for five years. Another conspiracy was betrayed in 1460, causing the Venetians to launch a persecution of many locals, as well as Greek refugees from mainland Greece. The protopapas of Rethymno, Petros Tzangaropoulos, was among the leaders of the conspiracy. Although the revolutionary agitation subsided, the authorities remained nervous; in 1463, the settlement of the Lasithi plateau was allowed to produce grain in order to counter the famine, but as soon as the immediate danger had passed, it was banned again in 1471, and remained so until the early 16th century. In 1471, during the First Ottoman–Venetian War, the Ottoman fleet plundered the eastern parts of the island around Siteia.

It was not until 1523 that the first moves towards another Cretan revolt, under the leadership of Georgios Kantanoleos, started taking place. Exasperated by the heavy tax burden and the arbitrariness of Venetian government, about 600 men rose up in revolt around Kerameia. The Venetian authorities initially hesitated to move against the rebels, for fear of causing a wider uprising. In October 1527, however, Geronimo Corner with 1,500 troops marched against the rebels. The uprising was suppressed with great violence, and all the villages in the rebel area were destroyed. Three of the leaders, the brothers Georgios and Andronikos Chortatsis, and Leon Theotokopoulos, were betrayed in 1528 and hanged, while Kantanoleos himself was proscribed for 1,000 hyperpyra, and also betrayed. Altogether some 700 people were killed; many families were exiled to Cyprus, in the area of Paphos, but after about a decade many were allowed to return and even reclaim their possessions on Crete.

During the Third Ottoman–Venetian War, the Ottomans demanded the recognition of the Sultan's overlordship over Crete and the payment of an annual tribute. In June 1538, the Ottoman admiral Hayreddin Barbarossa captured Mylopotamos, Apokoronas, and Kerameia, besieged Chania without success, and then marched to Rethymno and Candia. It was only the appeal of the Venetian authorities to the local population, offering amnesty and tax exemptions, that preserved the city, especially when the Kallergis brothers Antonios and Mathios used their fortune to recruit men and strengthen the island's fortifications. Nevertheless, the Turks ravaged the area around Fodele, and destroyed the forts of Mirabello, Siteia, and Palaiokastro. The Ottoman attacks resumed in 1539, when Selino was surrendered by its inhabitants and its Venetian garrison captured. The fortress of Ierapetra also fell, but Kissamos resisted successfully.

In 1571, during the war for Cyprus, Uluç Ali briefly captured Rethymno and raided Crete, resulting in widespread famine on the island. Some local inhabitants, resentful at Venetian misgovernment, even made contact with the Turks, but the intervention of the Cretan nobleman Matthaios Kallergis managed to calm down spirits, and restore order. Two years later, in 1573, the area around Chania was raided.

Another conflict broke out in November 1571, when the Venetian governor, Marino Cavalli, moved to subdue the area of Sfakia. The isolated and mountainous area had always remained free of effective Venetian control, and their raids in the lowlands and the constant feuds between the leading Sfakian clans caused great insecurity in the wider area. After blockading all passes to Sfakia, Cavalli began laying waste to the region and killing large part of the population. The Sfakians were finally forced to submit, and delegations from the entire region appeared before Cavalli to swear allegiance to Venice. Cavalli's successor, Jacopo Foscarini, took measures to pacify the area, allowing its inhabitants to return to their homes, but soon Sfakia again became a hotbed of disorder, so that in 1608, the governor Nicolas Sagredo prepared to invade the area again, only for the plan to be dismissed by his successor, who restored order by personally touring the region.

== Administration ==
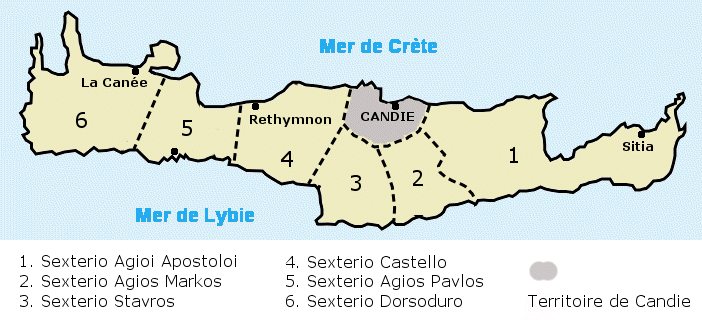
The Venetian sestieri of Crete in the 13th century: 1. Santi Apostoli (Holy Apostles), 2. San Marco (St. Mark), 3. Santa Croce (Holy Cross), 4. Castello, 5. San Polo (St. Paul), 6. Dorsoduro

The conquest of Crete brought Venice its first major colony; indeed, the island would remain the largest possession of the Republic until its expansion into the northern Italian mainland (the Terraferma) in the early 15th century. In addition to the unfamiliar challenges of governing a territory of such size and eminence, the distance of Crete from the metropolis—about a month's journey by galley—raised dangers and complications. As a result, unlike other colonies, where the Venetian government was content to allow governance by the local Venetian colonists, in Crete the Republic employed salaried officials dispatched from the metropolis. This "made subjects of both the Venetian colonizers and the colonized Greek people of the island", and despite the privileges accorded to the former, their common position of subservience to the metropolis made it more likely for the Venetians and Greeks of Crete to rally together in support of common interests against the metropolitan authorities.

=== Central government and military command ===
The regime established by Venice in Crete was modelled after that of the metropolis itself. It was headed by a Duke (duca di Candia), and included a Great Council, a Senate, a Council of Ten, an Avogadoria de Comùn, and other institutions that existed in the metropolis. The Duke of Crete was elected from among the Venetian patriciate for two-year terms, and was assisted by four, and later only two councillors (consiglieri), likewise appointed for two-year terms; of the original four, two were rectors of cities on the island. Together, the Duke and his councillors comprised the Signoria, the central government, of Crete. There were also two, and later three, chamberlains (camerlenghi), charged with fiscal affairs, and each province had its own treasury (camera). The lower strata of the hierarchy were complemented by judges and police officials (the giudici and the signori di notte), castellans (castellani) and the grand chancellor (cancelliere grande).

As in most greater territories with a special military importance, military command was vested in a captain (capitano). In times of crisis or war, a provveditore generale (the provveditore generale [del regno] di Candia) was appointed, with supreme power over both civil and military officials on the island. After 1569, as the Ottoman danger increased, the appointment of a provveditore generale became regular even in peacetime for two-year tenures, and the post came to be held by some of the most eminent statesmen of Venice. A further provveditore generale was appointed from 1578 to command the island's cavalry, and an admiral, the 'Captain of the Guard [Fleet] of Crete' (Capitano alla guardia di Candia) commanded the local naval forces.

=== Provincial and local administration ===
Just like the city of Venice itself, the "Venice of the East" was initially divided into six provinces, or sestieri. From east to west these were:

- Santi Apostoli (Holy Apostles) or Cannaregio, comprising the districts of Siteia, Ierapetra, Mirabello, and Lasithi; it was essentially coterminous with the modern Lasithi Prefecture.
- San Marco (St. Mark), comprising the districts of Rizokastro (Ven. Belvedere) and Pediada.
- Santa Croce (Holy Cross), comprising the districts of Monofatsio (Ven. Bonifacio), Kainourgio (Castelnuovo), and Pyrgiotissa.
- Castello, comprising the districts of Mylopotamos, Arios, and Apano Syvritos
- San Polo (St. Paul), comprising the districts of Kalamonas (i.e., Rethymno), Kato Syvritos or St. Basil's, and Psychros or Apokoronas (Ven. Bicorono).
- Dorsoduro, comprising the districts of Chania, Kissamos, and Selino

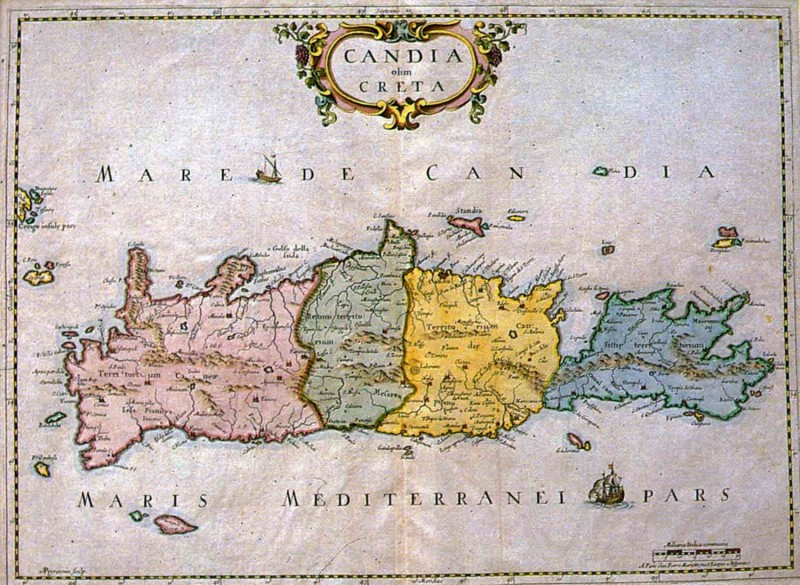
Map showing the four territoria of Crete

From the early 14th century on, the island was divided into four larger provinces (territoria):

- Territorio of Candia, by far the largest in area, roughly equivalent to the modern Heraklion Prefecture along with the Lasithi plateau and Mirabello Province
- Territorio of Rethymno (Ven. Rettimo), roughly coterminous with the modern Rethymno Prefecture
- Territorio of Chania (Ven. Canea), roughly coterminous with the modern provinces of Apokoronas, Kissamos, Kydonia, and Selino
- Territorio of Siteia, roughly coterminous with the modern Siteia and Ierapetra provinces

With the creation of the territoria, rectors (rettori) began to be appointed in their capitals, with civil and held limited military authority in their province: from 1307 in Chania and Rethymno, and from 1314 in Siteia. The rettore of Chania originally was one of the four councillors of the Duke of Crete. The rectors of Chania and Rethymno were also assisted by a provveditore and two councillors each. In addition, there was a special provveditore appointed over Sfakia, a region which in practice was mostly outside Venetian control. He was subordinate to Candia (but also sometimes to Chania). Provveditori were also appointed to the important island fortresses of Souda (since 1573), Spinalonga (since 1580), and Grambousa (since 1584). The island was further divided into castellanies and feudal domains held by the local aristocracy.

== Society ==
During Venetian rule, the Greek population of Crete was exposed to Renaissance culture. A thriving literature in the Cretan dialect of Greek developed on the island. The best-known work from this period is the poem Erotokritos by Vitsentzos Kornaros (Βιτσένζος Κορνάρος). Another major Cretan literary figures were Marcus Musurus (1470–1517), Nicholas Kalliakis (1645–1707), Andreas Musalus (1665–1721), and other Greek scholars and philosophers who flourished in Italy in the 15-17th Centuries.

Georgios Hortatzis was author of the dramatic work Erophile. The painter Domenicos Theotocopoulos, better known as El Greco, was born in Crete in this period and was trained in Byzantine iconography before moving to Italy and later, Spain.

== Sources ==
- Abulafia, David: Enrico conte di Malta e la sua Vita nel Mediterraneo: 1203–1230, in In Italia, Sicilia e nel Mediterraneo: 1100–1400, 1987.
- Aggelarakis, Anagnostis (2018). "Cretans in Byzantine Foreign Policy and Military Affairs since the 4th Crusade". Πεπραγμένα του ΙΑ′ Διεθνούς Κρητολογικού Συνεδρίου, Ρέθυμνο, 21-27 Οκτωβρίου 2011. Τόμος Β1, Τμήμα βυζαντινών και μέσων χρόνων, Ιστορία. Rethymno: Historical and Folklore Society of Rethymno. pp. 7–44.
- Arbel, Benjamin (2013). "Venice's Maritime Empire in the Early Modern Period". A Companion to Venetian History, 1400–1797. Brill. pp. 125–253. ISBN 978-90-04-25252-3.
- Da Mosto, Andrea (1940). L'Archivio di Stato di Venezia. Indice Generale, Storico, Descrittivo ed Analitico. Tomo II: Archivi dell'Amministrazione Provinciale della Repubblica Veneta, archivi delle rappresentanze diplomatiche e consolari, archivi dei governi succeduti alla Repubblica Veneta, archivi degli istituti religiosi e archivi minori (PDF) (in Italian). Rome: Biblioteca d'arte editrice. OCLC 889222113.
- Detorakis, Theocharis E. (1986). Ιστορία της Κρήτης [History of Crete] (in Greek). Athens. OCLC 715204595.
- Holton, David, ed. (1991). Literature and Society in Renaissance Crete. Cambridge: Cambridge University Press. ISBN 0-521-32579-X.
  - Bancroft-Marcus, Rosemary. "The Pastoral Mode". In Holton (1991), pp. 79–102.
  - Holton, David. "The Cretan Renaissance". In Holton (1991), pp. 1–16.
  - Maltezou, Chryssa. "The Historical and Social Context". In Holton (1991), pp. 17–48.
- Jacoby, David (1999), "Cretan Cheese: A Neglected Aspect of Venetian Medieval Trade", in Kittell, Ellen E.; Madden, Thomas F. (eds.), Medieval and Renaissance Venice, Urbana: University of Illinois Press, pp. 49–68, ISBN 9780252024610
- Jacoby, David (2010). "Candia between Venice, Byzantium and the Levant: the rise of a major emporium to the mid-fifteenth century". In Vassilaki, Maria (ed.). The hand of Angelos. An icon painter in Venetian Crete. Ashgate. pp. 38–47. ISBN 978-1-84822-064-5.
- Jacoby, David (2014). "The Economy of Latin Greece". A Companion to Latin Greece. Brill. pp. 185–216. ISBN 9789004284104.
- Lane, Frederic C. (1973), Venice, A Maritime Republic, Johns Hopkins University Press, ISBN 978-0801814600
- Maltezou, Chryssa (2010). "The history of Crete during the fifteenth century on the basis of archival documents". In Vassilaki, Maria (ed.). The hand of Angelos. An icon painter in Venetian Crete. Ashgate. pp. 26–37. ISBN 978-1-84822-064-5.
- McKee, Sally (2000), Uncommon Dominion: Venetian Crete and the Myth of Ethnic Purity, University Of Pennsylvania Press, ISBN 978-0-8122-3562-3
- Miller, William (1908). The Latins in the Levant: A History of Frankish Greece (1204–1566). London: John Murray.
- Nicol, Donald M. (1988). Byzantium and Venice: A Study in Diplomatic and Cultural Relations. Cambridge: Cambridge University Press. ISBN 0-521-34157-4.
- Papadaki, Aspasia (2018). "Από τον δούκα στον γενικό προνοητή: θεσμικές διαφοροποιήσεις και συμπτώσεις στη βενετική Κρήτη" [From Duke to Provveditore Generale: Institutional Differentiations and Coincidences in Venetian Crete]. Πεπραγμένα του ΙΑ′ Διεθνούς Κρητολογικού Συνεδρίου, Ρέθυμνο, 21-27 Οκτωβρίου 2011. Τόμος Β1, Τμήμα βυζαντινών και μέσων χρόνων, Ιστορία (in Greek). Rethymno: Historical and Folklore Society of Rethymno. pp. 67–76.
- Papadopoli, Zuanne (2007), L'occio (time of leisure). Memories of seventeenth century Crete; preface & comments by Alfred Vincent, Venice: Hellenic Institute of Byzantine studies in Venice, ISBN 978-9-60774-341-1
- Ploumidis, Georgios & Alexiou, Stylianos (1974). "Λατινοκρατούμενες ελληνικές χώρες: Κρήτη" [Latin-ruled Greek lands: Crete]. In Christopoulos, Georgios A. & Bastias, Ioannis K. (eds.). Ιστορία του Ελληνικού Έθνους [History of the Greek Nation] (in Greek). Vol. Ι: Ο Ελληνισμός υπό ξένη κυριαρχία (περίοδος 1453 - 1669), Τουρκοκρατία - Λατινοκρατία [Hellenism under Foreign Rule (Period 1453 - 1669), Turkocracy – Latinocracy]. Athens: Ekdotiki Athinon. pp. 201–215. ISBN 978-960-213-106-0.
- Setton, Kenneth M. (1976). The Papacy and the Levant (1204–1571), Volume I: The Thirteenth and Fourteenth Centuries. Vol. 1. Philadelphia: The American Philosophical Society. ISBN 0-87169-114-0.
- Stallsmith, Allaire B. (2007), "One Colony, Two Mother Cities: Cretan Agriculture under Venetian and Ottoman Rule", in Davies, Siriol (ed.), Between Venice and Istanbul: Colonial Landscapes in Early Modern Greece, Hesperia Supplements, vol. 40, The American School of Classical Studies at Athens, pp. 151–171, ISBN 9780876615409
- Thiriet, Freddy (1975). La Romanie vénitienne au Moyen Age: le développement et l'exploitation du domaine colonial vénitien, XIIe-XVe siècles (in French) (Second ed.). Éditions E. de Boccard.
- Thiriet, Freddy Ed. (1980). "Églises, fidèles et clergés en Crète vénitienne (de la conquête 1204/1211 au XVe siècle)" [Churches, Faithful, and Clergy in Venetian Crete (From the Conquest 1204/1211 to the 15th Century)]. Πεπραγμένα του Δ' Διεθνούς Κρητολογικού Συνεδρίου, Ηράκλειο, 29 Αυγούστου - 3 Δεκεμβρίου 1976. Τόμος Β′ Βυζαντινοί και μέσοι χρόνοι (in French). Athens: University of Crete. pp. 484–500.
