= Monofatsi =

Monofatsi Province Επαρχία Μονοφατσίου
- Province of Greece
- 2006
- Capital: Pyrgos

Monofatsi was a province of Heraklion Prefecture, Crete, Greece. Its territory corresponded with that of the current municipal units Asterousia and Kofinas, and parts of the municipal units Agia Varvara, Arkalochori and Nikos Kazantzakis. It was abolished in 2006.
