= Provinces of Greece =

Former sub-divisions of Greece's prefectures

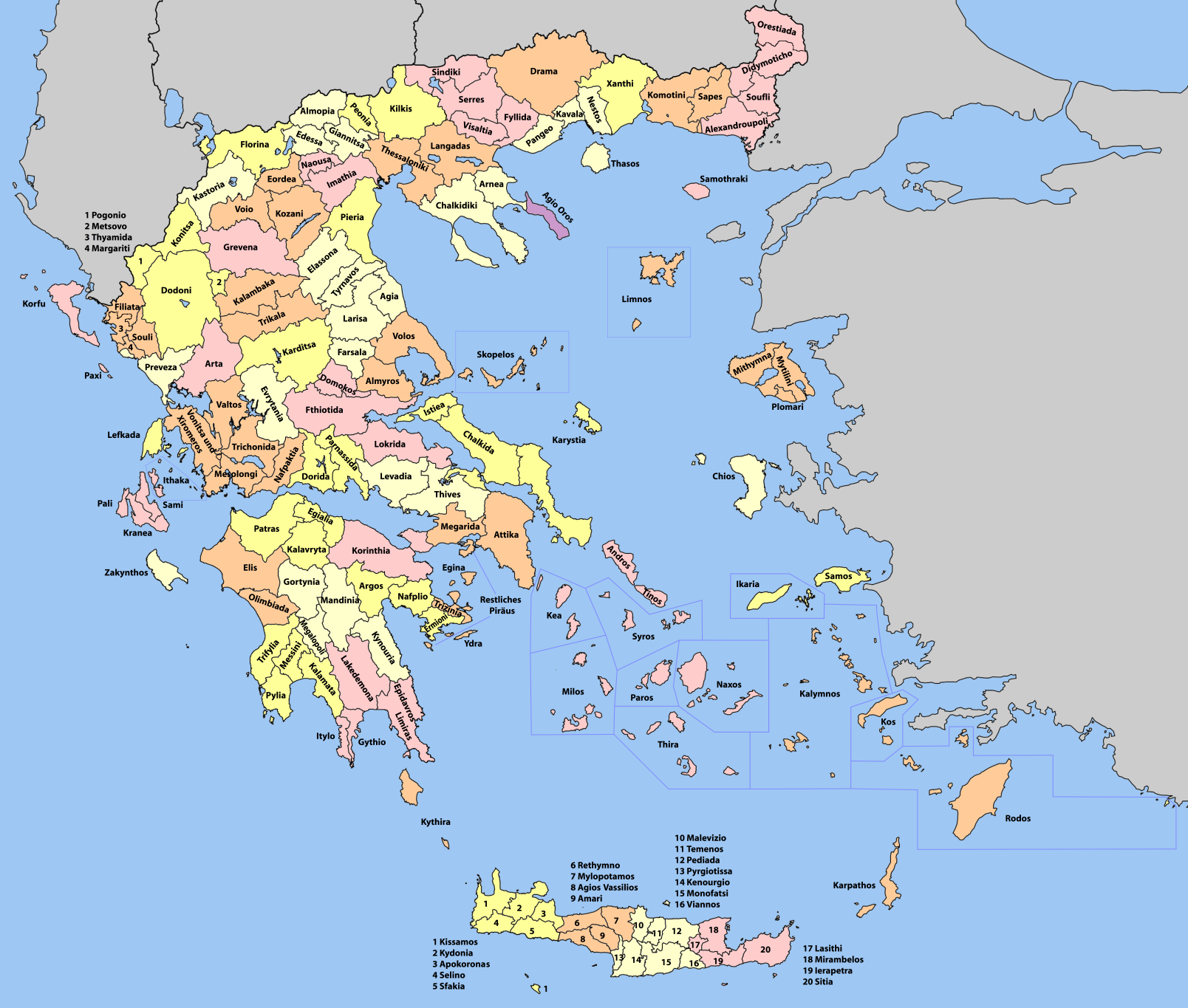
Map with the provinces (eparchies) of Greece.

The provinces of Greece (Greek: επαρχία, "eparchy") were sub-divisions of some of the country's prefectures. From 1887, the provinces were abolished as actual administrative units, but were retained for some state services, especially financial and educational services, as well as for electoral purposes. Before the Second World War, there were 139 provinces, and after the war, with the addition of the Dodecanese Islands, their number grew to 148. According to the Article 7 of the Code of Prefectural Self-Government (Presidential Decree 30/1996), the provinces constituted a "particular administrative district" within the wider "administrative district" of the prefectures. The provinces were finally abolished after the 2006 local elections, in line with Law 2539/1997, as part of the wide-ranging administrative reform known as the "Kapodistrias Project", and replaced by enlarged municipalities (demoi).

== Organization ==
Provincial administration consisted of two parts: a collective Provincial Council and an eparch (Greek: έπαρχος). Members of the Provincial Council were the prefectural councillors of the respective province. The eparch or sub-prefect was the prefectural councillor who received the most votes in the prefectural elections.

== List ==
This is a list of the former provinces of Greece and their capitals, sorted by prefecture, as they stood in 1991:

- Achaea
  - Aigialeia Province - Aigio
  - Kalavryta Province - Kalavryta
  - Patras Province - Patras
- Aetolia-Acarnania
  - Missolonghi Province - Missolonghi
  - Nafpaktia Province - Nafpaktos
  - Trichonida Province - Agrinio
  - Valtos Province - Amfilochia
  - Vonitsa-Xiromero Province - Vonitsa
- Arcadia
  - Gortynia Province - Dimitsana
  - Kynouria Province - Leonidio
  - Mantineia Province - Tripoli
  - Megalopoli Province - Megalopoli
- Argolis
  - Argos Province - Argos
  - Ermionida Province - Kranidi
  - Nafplia Province - Nafplio
- Arta Prefecture: no provinces
- Athens Prefecture: no provinces
- Boeotia
  - Thebes Province - Thebes (Thiva)
  - Livadeia Province - Livadeia
- Chalkidiki
  - Arnaia Province - Arnaia
  - Chalkidiki Province - Polygyros
- Chania Prefecture
  - Apokoronas Province - Vamos
  - Kissamos Province - Kissamos
  - Kydonia Province - Chania
  - Selino Province - Kandanos
  - Sfakia Province - Chora Sfakion
- Chios Prefecture: no provinces
- Corfu Prefecture (Kerkyra)
  - Corfu Province - Corfu
  - Paxoi Province - Gaios
- Corinthia: no provinces
- Cyclades Prefecture
  - Andros Province - Andros
  - Kea Province - Ioulis
  - Milos Province - Milos
  - Naxos Province - Naxos (city)
  - Syros Province - Ermoupoli
  - Paros Province - Paros
  - Thira Province - Santorini
  - Tinos Province - Tinos (town)
- Dodecanese Prefecture
  - Kalymnos Province - Kalymnos
  - Karpathos Province - Karpathos
  - Kos Province - Kos
  - Rhodes Province - Rhodes
- Drama Prefecture: no provinces
- East Attica
  - Attica Province (part)
- Elis Prefecture
  - Elis Province - Pyrgos
  - Olympia Province - Andritsaina
- Euboea Prefecture
  - Chalcis Province - Chalcis
  - Istiaia Province - Istiaia
  - Karystia Province - Karystos
- Evros Prefecture
  - Alexandroupoli Province - Alexandroupoli
  - Didymoteicho Province - Didymoteicho
  - Orestiada Province - Orestiada
  - Samothrace Province - Samothrace
  - Soufli Province - Soufli
- Evrytania: no provinces
- Florina Prefecture: no provinces
- Heraklion Prefecture
  - Kainourgio Province - Moires
  - Malevizi Province - Agios Myronas
  - Monofatsi Province - Pyrgos
  - Pediada Province - Kastelli
  - Pyrgiotissa Province - Voroi
  - Temenos Province - Heraklion
  - Viannos Province - Pefkos
- Grevena Prefecture: no provinces
- Imathia
  - Imathia Province - Veroia
  - Naousa Province - Naousa
- Ioannina Prefecture
  - Dodoni Province - Ioannina
  - Konitsa Province - Konitsa
  - Metsovo Province - Metsovo
  - Pogoni Province - Delvinaki
- Kastoria Prefecture: no provinces
- Kavala Prefecture
  - Kavala Province - Kavala
  - Nestos Province - Chrysoupoli
  - Pangaio Province - Eleftheroupoli
  - Thasos Province - Thasos (town)
- Kefallinia Prefecture
  - Ithaca Province - Ithaca
  - Kranaia Province - Argostoli
  - Pali Province - Lixouri
  - Sami Province - Sami
- Karditsa Prefecture: no provinces
- Kilkis Prefecture
  - Kilkis Province - Kilkis
  - Paionia Province - Goumenissa
- Kozani Prefecture
  - Kozani Province - Kozani
  - Eordaia Province - Ptolemaida
  - Voio Province - Siatista
- Laconia
  - Epidavros Limira - Molaoi
  - Gytheio Province - Gytheio
  - Lacedaemon Province - Sparti
  - Oitylo Province - Areopoli
- Larissa Prefecture
  - Agia Province - Agia
  - Elassona Province - Elassona
  - Farsala Province - Farsala
  - Larissa Province - Larissa
  - Tyrnavos Province - Tyrnavos
- Lasithi
  - Ierapetra Province - Ierapetra
  - Lasithi Province - Tzermiado
  - Mirampello Province - Neapoli
  - Siteia Province - Siteia
- Lefkada Prefecture: no provinces
- Lesbos Prefecture
  - Lemnos Province - Myrina
  - Mithymna Province - Mithymna
  - Mytilene Province - Mytilene
  - Plomari Province - Plomari
- Magnesia Prefecture
  - Almyros Province - Almyros
  - Skopelos Province - Skopelos
  - Volos Province - Volos
- Messenia
  - Kalamai Province - Kalamata
  - Messini Province - Messini
  - Pylia Province - Pylos
  - Trifylia Province - Kyparissia
- Pella Prefecture
  - Almopia Province - Aridaia
  - Edessa Province - Edessa
  - Giannitsa Province - Giannitsa
- Phocis
  - Dorida Province - Lidoriki
  - Parnassida Province - Amfissa
- Phthiotis
  - Domokos Province - Domokos
  - Locris Province - Atalanti
  - Phthiotis Province - Lamia
- Pieria Prefecture: no provinces
- Piraeus Prefecture
  - Aegina Province - Aegina
  - Cythera Province - Cythera
  - Hydra Province - Hydra
  - Piraeus Province
  - Troizinia Province - Poros
- Preveza Prefecture: no provinces
- Rethymno Prefecture
  - Agios Vasileios Province - Spili
  - Amari Province - Amari
  - Mylopotamos Province - Perama
  - Rethymno Province - Rethymno
- Rhodope Prefecture
  - Komotini Province - Komotini
  - Sapes Province - Sapes
- Samos Prefecture
  - Ikaria Province - Agios Kirykos
  - Samos Province - Samos
- Serres Prefecture
  - Fyllida Province - Nea Zichni
  - Serres Province - Serres
  - Sintiki Province - Sidirokastro
  - Visaltia Province - Nigrita
- Thesprotia
  - Filiates Province - Filiates
  - Thyamida Province - Igoumenitsa
  - Margariti Province - Margariti
  - Souli Province - Paramythia
- Thessaloniki Prefecture
  - Thessaloniki Province - Thessaloniki
  - Lagkadas Province - Lagkadas
- Trikala Prefecture
  - Trikala Province - Trikala
  - Kalambaka Province - Kalambaka
- West Attica
  - Attica Province (part)
  - Megaris Province - Megara
- Xanthi Prefecture: no provinces
- Zakynthos: no provinces
