= Nisoplaka =

Greek islet in the Libyan Sea

Native name: Νησοπλάκα
- Interactive map of Nisoplaka

Geography
- Coordinates: 34°57′13″N 25°09′26″E
- Archipelago: Cretan Islands

Administration
- Greece
- Region: Crete
- Regional unit: Heraklion

Nisoplaka (Greek: Νησοπλάκα, "island rock") is a small islet off the coast of the Greek island of Crete in the Libyan Sea. The islet is administered from Asterousia in Heraklion regional unit.
