= Agia Varvara (disambiguation) =

Agia Varvara (Greek: Αγία Βαρβάρα) is the name of several towns :

== Cyprus ==
- Agia Varvara, Nicosia, a village in Nicosia District
- Agia Varvara, Paphos, a village in Paphos District

== Greece ==
- Agia Varvara, a suburb of Athens
- Agia Varvara, Akrata, a village in eastern Achaea
- Agia Varvara, Tritaia, a village in Tritaia, western Achaea
- Agia Varvara, Heraklion, a municipality on Crete
- Agia Varvara (island), an islet situated close to the northern coast of Crete, near Malia

== Other uses ==
- SS Agia Varvara, a ship
