= Charakas =

Charakas Χάρακας
- Community
- Location within Greece
- Coordinates: 35°01′N 25°07′E
- Country: Greece
- Administrative region: Crete
- Regional unit: Heraklion
- Municipality: Archanes-Asterousia
- Municipal unit: Asterousia

Population (2021)
  - Community: 820
- Time zone: UTC+2 (EET)
  - Summer (DST): UTC+3 (EEST)

Charakas (Greek: Χάρακας) is a village and a community in the municipal unit of Asterousia on Crete, Greece with about 800 inhabitants. It is about 45 km south from Heraklion, which is the largest city of Crete. The village lies on the foothills of the Asterousia Mountains, 15 km from the south coast of Crete, behind the mountain Libyan Sea.

Charakas has a great rock (charaki), 35m high, with a temple and a castle. Also in the front of Haraki is the Heroon, a monument of warriors and a church of Saint Panteleimon with a great campanile.

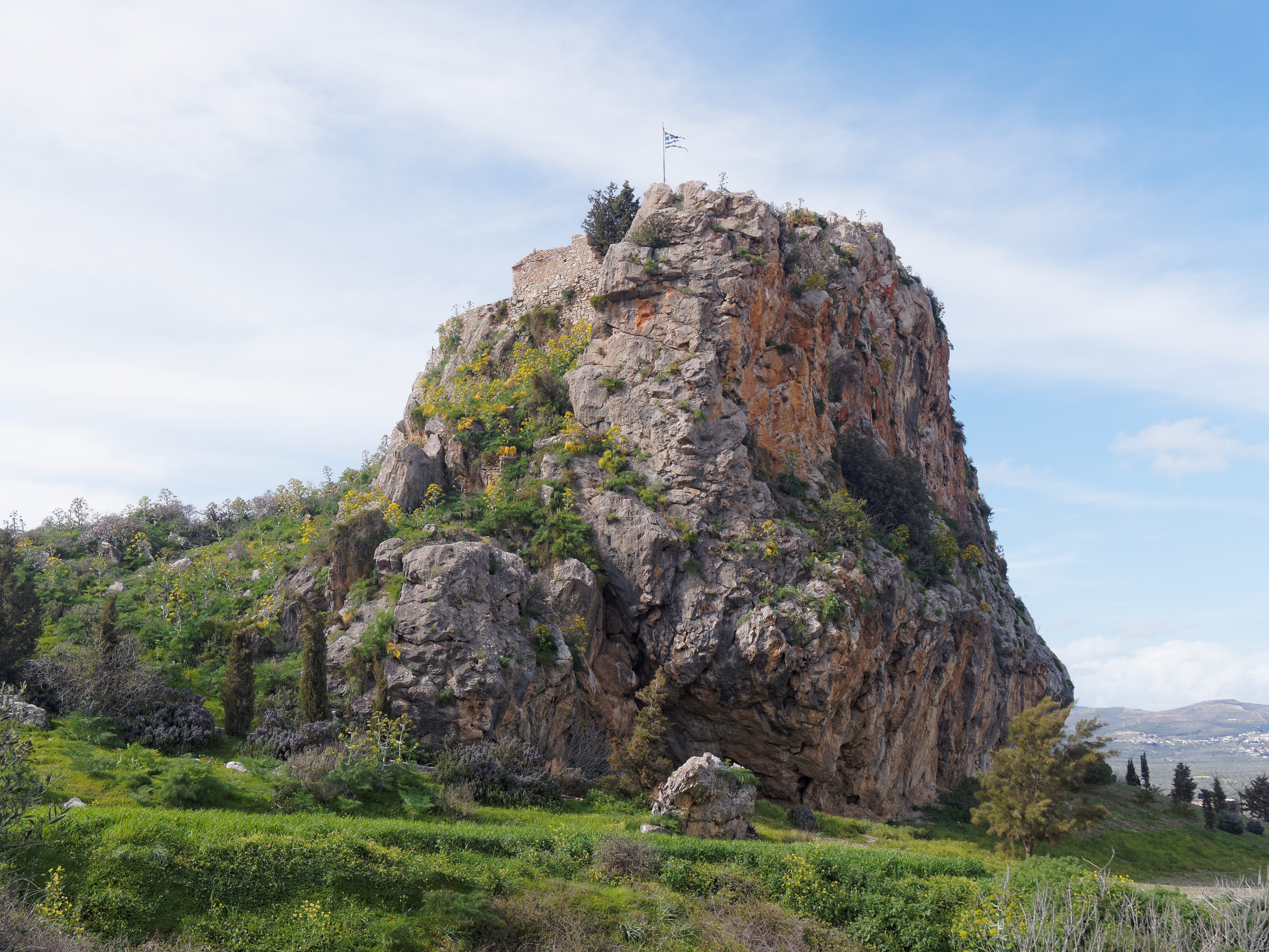
Haraki of Harakas

== History ==
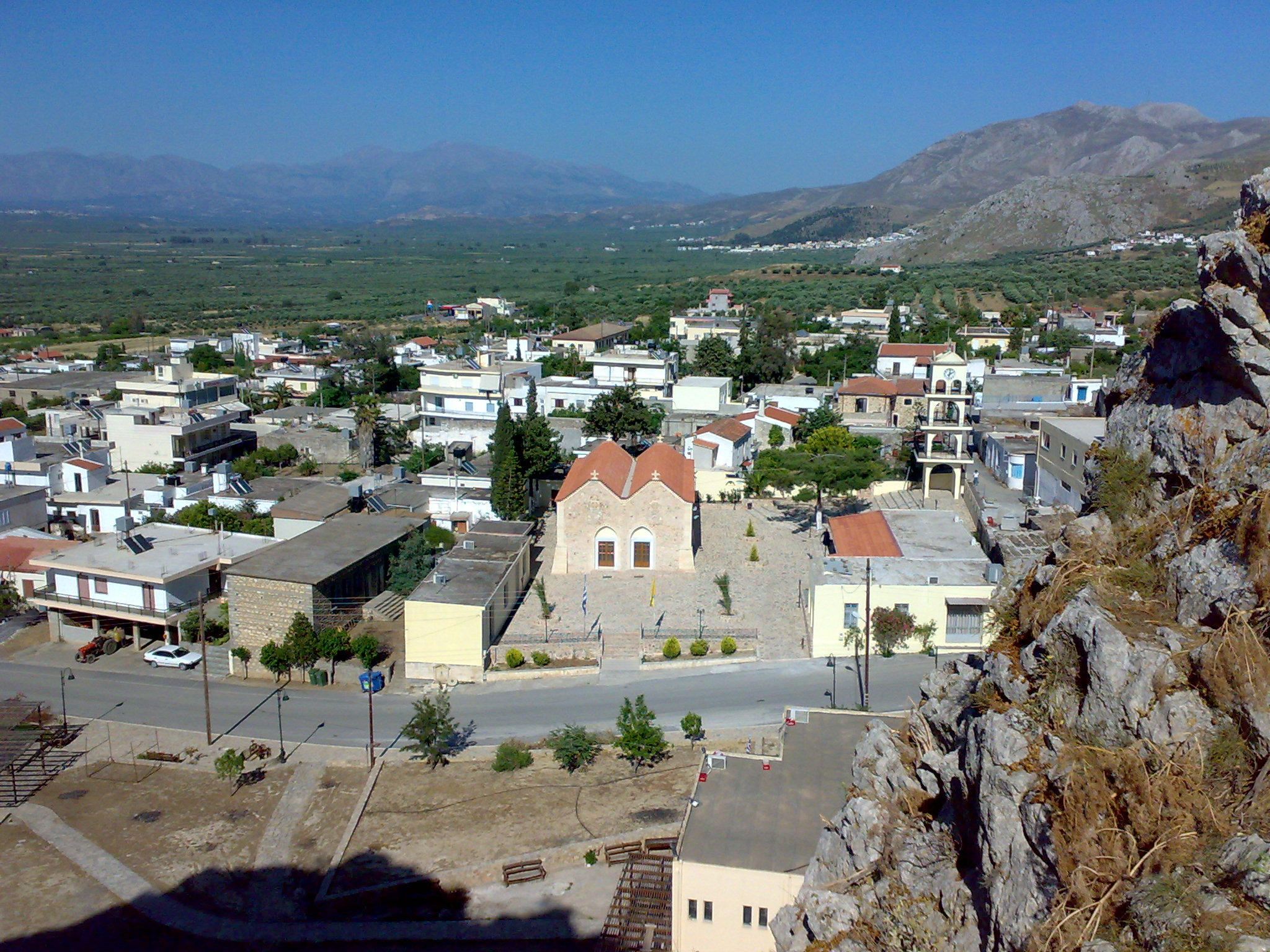
view of the village from ο Haraki

During the period of Venice domination the name of village was San Giovanni, but renamed in Harakas, because there is a great rock in the west side, 35 meters high and about 60m in the width with the name (haraki).On the rock is built a castle and a church The rock is accessed only from the east and it is a monolithic barrow.

== Community of Charakas ==
The community of Charakas (Δημοτική Κοινότητα Χάρακος) consists of the village Charakas and the smaller villages Agia Fotia (Αγιά Φωτιά) (pop. 22, at elevation 275 m, 2 km to the West from Charakas) and Doraki (Δωράκι) (pop. 24, at elevation 310 m, 1.5 km to the East from Charakas).
