= Georgios Sifakis =

Cretan priest, teacher, and resistance member

- Γεώργιος Σηφάκης (Greek)
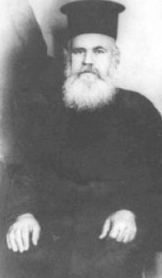
- Born: 1870; Agia Varvara, Heraklion
- Died: 1942 (aged 71–72); Gazi, Heraklion
- Cause of death: Execution
- Occupations: Priest, Teacher

Georgios Sifakis (Greek: Γεώργιος Σηφάκης; 1870 – 1942) was a Greek priest, teacher, a member of the resistance during the Second World War, and one of the 62 Martyrs of Crete.

== Biography ==
He was born in Agia Varvara, Heraklion, in 1870 and was a member of the Sifakis family, which was a significant contributor to the resistance in general.

As a parish priest he served Agia Varvara from 1905 until his execution in 1942. He was the first teacher who taught in the Primary School of Panasos during the years 1921 – 1922. He was part of the local group of the Greek Resistance against the German Occupation and was arrested three times by the Germans.

== Participation in the Greek Resistance ==
He was executed on 14 June 1942 in Gazi, together with 49 more people, after he was abducted from Agia Varvara, where he was residing.

His son Evangelos Sifakis was executed the same day. Before his execution he ministered in the prison courtyard, where there was only a high altar, with German permission. He gave communion to his co-prisoners, and after being chosen they were loaded up to cars and driven to the execution area. During the transportation he was singing the Eastern Orthodox requiem.

His brother Michail Sifakis was executed on 3 June 1942.

Every year there is a memorial service in All Saints' church in Ammoudare in Gazi being performed in honour of the executed, in the presence of local officials and the armed forces.

In his native village of Agia Varvara, he is commemorated with a bust in the village's square. He was granted a medal and a diploma from the Ministry of National Defence as a member of the resistance group of Emmanouil Bantouvas, and an honorary diploma by "Dominikos Theotokopoulos", the Association of Primary Education Teachers of the Heraklion prefecture.

His grandson Konstantinos Sifakis, was a longtime secretary of the community of Agia Vervara, while his nephew Grigoris Sifakis is a professor of Ancient Greek philology in the Aristotelian University of Thessaloniki.
