= Arnaia History and Folklore Museum =

History and Folklore Museum of Arnaia
- Ιστορικό-Λαογραφικό Μουσείο Αρναίας
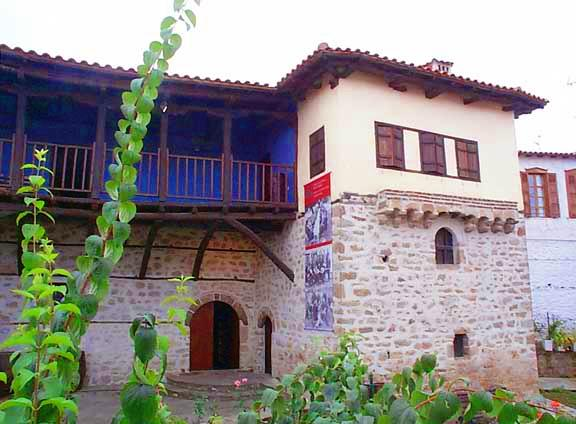
- Outside view
- Established: 1999
- Location: Arnaia, Greece
- Coordinates: 40.4861148°N 23.5929517°E
- Type: History museum Art museum
- Owner: Municipality of Arnaia

The History and Folklore Museum of Arnaia (Greek: Ιστορικό-Λαογραφικό Μουσείο Αρναίας) is located in the town of Arnaia in Chalkidiki, Central Macedonia, Greece, 58 km from Thessaloniki and 37 km from Polygyros.

The museum, which belongs to the municipality, is behind the National Bank in the town centre. It is housed in a two-storey town-house of the eighteenth century, which was owned by Konstandinos Katsangelos and used to house the folklore collection put together by the Cultural and Educational Association of Arnaia. After being renovated it has opened as a museum in the summer of 1999.

The purpose of the museum is to display artefacts of the popular culture of Arnaia and the surrounding area.

== Exhibits ==
As one enters the building, the first hall contains typical examples of the architectural heritage of Arnaia, and the second traditional folk instruments. Apart from this, on the ground floor there is a display of agricultural implements (for sowing, reaping, threshing), bread-making equipment (millstones, kneading boards, proving troughs, bread-stamps), bee-keeping equipment (hives, frames, an extractor for centrifuging the honey from the cells, skeps), carpentry equipment (vices, moulds for rooftiles and bricks, files, planes). On the mezzanine floor is the wherewithal for preparing and serving coffee, and on the first floor weaving equipment (a loom, a distaff, cards, a spinning wheel, carding machines), and tools and utensils for everyday use (cooking utensils, receptacles for carrying water, cauldrons, washing troughs, a brazier).

One particularly important exhibit is the Arnaia fire-engine, which is 200 years old and based on the force-pump invented by Ktesibios (285-220 BC). Its basic operating principle is the piston, and it consists of bronze receptacles fitted with two pistons, between which the water passes and is stored in the receptacles.

== Gallery ==
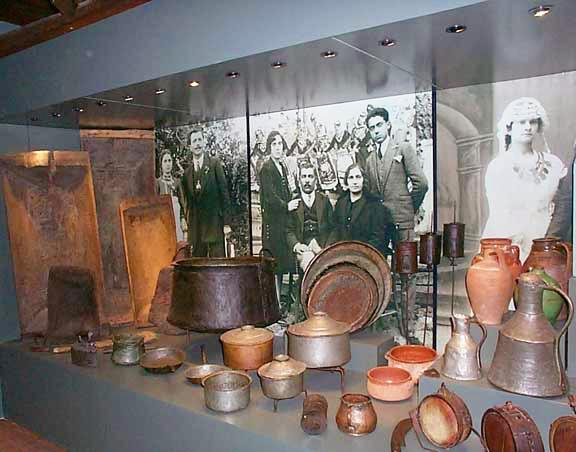
Cooking Utensils

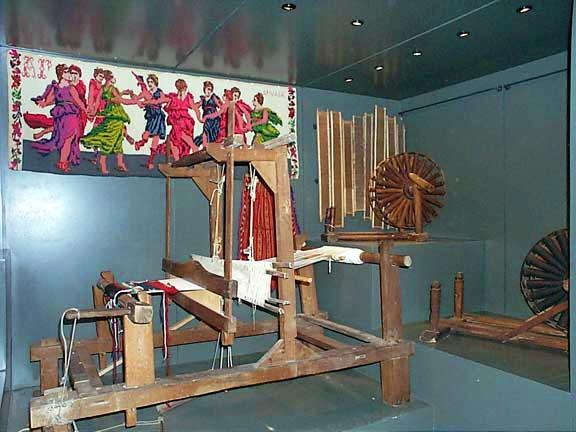
A Loom

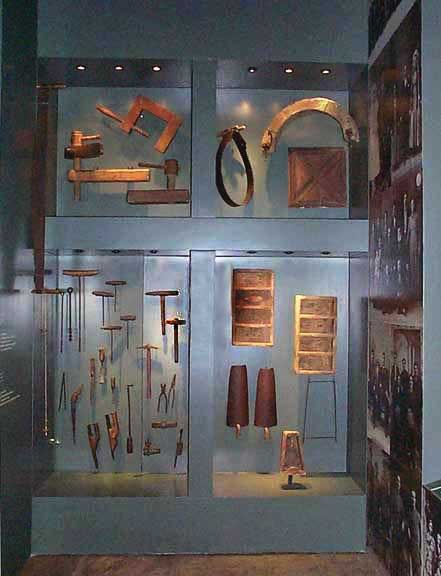
Carpentry Equipment

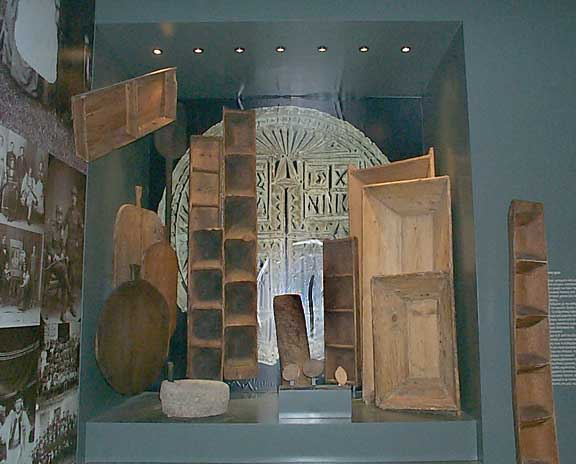
Bread-making Equipment

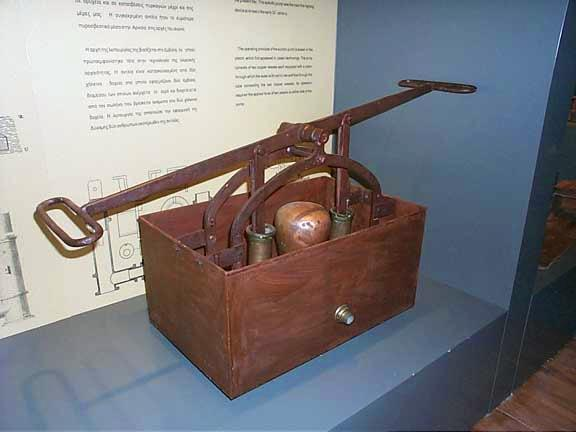
200 years old Fire Engine of Arnaia
