= Afentis Christos =

Greek islet in the Sea of Crete

Afendis Christos
Native name: Αφέντης Χριστός
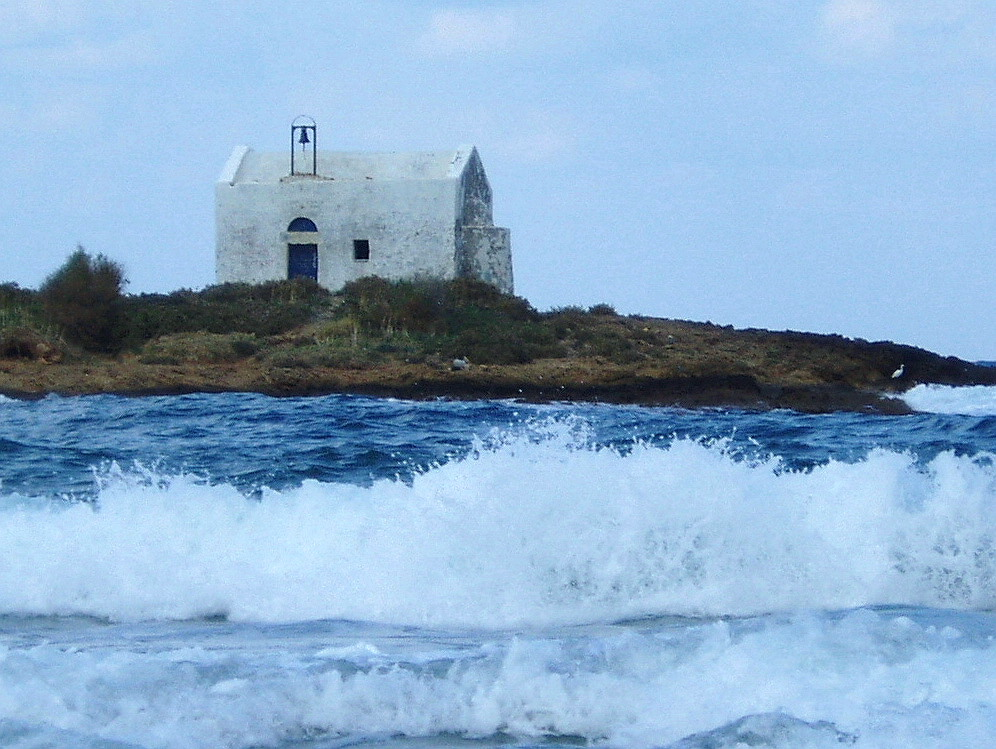
- The islet of Afendis Christos at Malia.

- Location within Greece

Geography
- Coordinates: 35.2954°N 25.4609°E
- Archipelago: Cretan Islands
- Area: 4,400 m^{2} (47,000 sq ft)

Administration
- Greece
- Region: Crete
- Regional unit: Heraklion

Afentis Christos (Greek: Αφέντης Χριστός, "Lord Christ") is a small islet off the northern coast of the Greek island of Crete named after the small chapel built there. The islet and chapel is only a short distance away from the beach at Malia and a short distance from the islet of Agia Varvara. Afentis Christos is administered from Malia in Heraklion regional unit. The islet has an area of 4,400 square metres.
