= Gergeri =

Gergeri Γέργερη
- Community
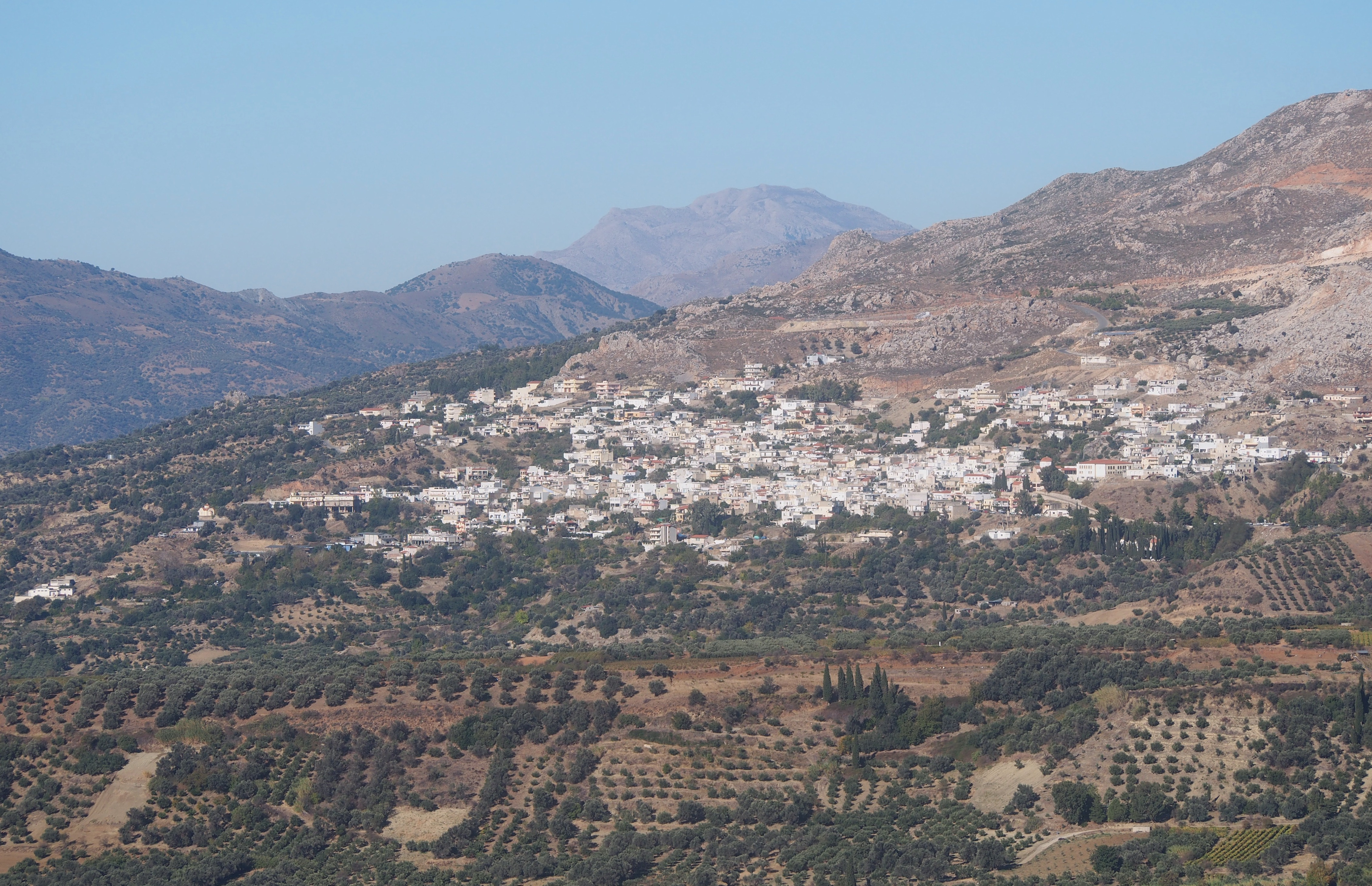
- View from east

- Location within Greece
- Coordinates: 35°07′58″N 24°57′00″E
- Country: Greece
- Administrative region: Crete
- Regional unit: Heraklion
- Municipality: Gortyna
- Municipal unit: Rouvas

Population (2021)
  - Community: 1,345
- Time zone: UTC+2 (EET)
  - Summer (DST): UTC+3 (EEST)

Gergeri (Greek: Γέργερη) is the seat of Rouvas municipal unit in Heraklion regional unit in the Greek island of Crete. The population was 1,345 in 2021. Gergeri's location is in the region called "Pano Riza" of Psiloreiti's, along with the villages Panasos, Nivritos, Zaros, Vorizia and Kamares. Near Gergeri also is the Rouva's Forest.

During the Greek War of Independence the Commissioner of Crete, Emmanouil Tombazis, gathered 3,000 Cretans in Gergeri to face a force of 12,000 Turkish-Egyptian soldiers at Ayia Varvara. On August 20, 1823 and despite a valiant defence against the much larger and better organised force, the Cretans had to retreat after losing 300 men in the battle at the village of Amouryelles.
