= Giannitsa Province =

Former province of the Pella Prefecture, Greece

Coordinates: 40.794708°N 22.414498°E

Giannitsa Province Επαρχία Γιαννιτσών
- Province of Greece
- 2006
- Capital: Giannitsa

Giannitsa Province was one of the three provinces of Pella Prefecture of Greece. It was the largest province from the other two Edessa and Almopia and the base is the city of Giannitsa. It occupied the eastern part of the prefecture. It belongs to the Region of Central Macedonia. Its territory corresponded with that of the current municipality Pella, and the municipal unit Meniida. It was abolished in 2006.
