= Trichonida =

Trichonida may refer to:

- Lake Trichonida, a lake in western Greece
- Trichonida Province, a former province in western Greece
