= Edessa Province =

Edessa Province Επαρχία Έδεσσας
- Province of Greece
- 2006
- Capital: Edessa

Edessa Province was one of the three provinces of Pella Prefecture of Greece. Its territory corresponded with that of the current municipalities Edessa and Skydra (except the municipal unit Meniida). It was abolished in 2006.
