= Chalkidiki Province =

Province of Chalkidiki Prefecture, Greece

Chalkidiki Province Επαρχία Χαλκιδικής
- Province of Greece
- 2006
- Capital: Polygyros

Chalkidiki Province was one of the provinces of the Chalkidiki Prefecture, Greece. Its territory corresponded with that of the current municipalities Kassandra, Nea Propontida, Polygyros, and Sithonia. It was abolished in 2006.
