= Livadeia Province =

Livadeia Province Επαρχία Λεβαδείας
- Province of Greece
- 2006
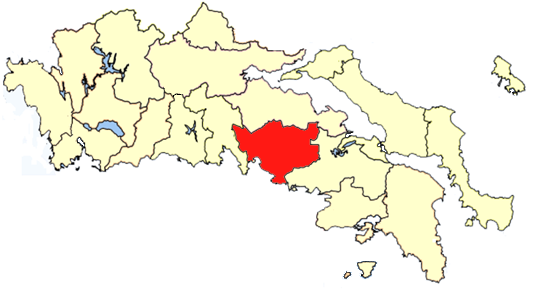
- Capital: Livadeia

Livadeia Province was one of the provinces of the Boeotia Prefecture, Greece. Its territory corresponded with that of the current municipalities Aliartos (except the municipal unit Thespies), Distomo-Arachova-Antikyra, Livadeia, and Orchomenos (except the municipal unit Akraifnia). It was abolished in 2006.
