= Phthiotis Province =

Former province in Greece

Phthiotis Province Επαρχία Φθιώτιδας
- Province of Greece
- 2006
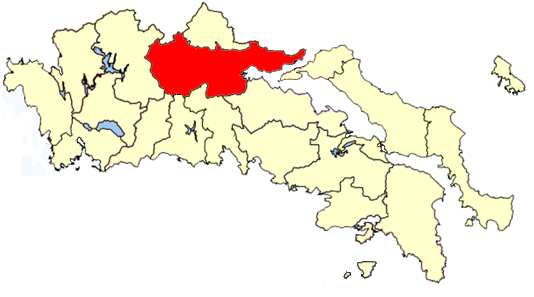
- Capital: Lamia

Phthiotis Province was one of the provinces of the Phthiotis Prefecture, Greece. Its territory corresponded with that of the current municipalities Lamia, Makrakomi, and Stylida. It was abolished in 2006.
