= Patras Province =

Coordinates: 38.13°N 21.62°E

Patras Province Επαρχία Πατρών
- Province of Greece
- 2006
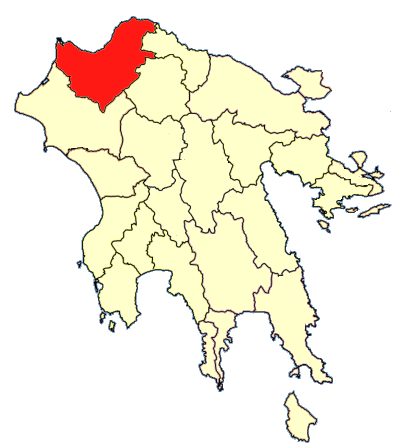
- Capital: Patras

Patras Province was a province covering the western part of the Achaea prefecture, Greece. Its largest city and seat of administration was Patras. Its territory corresponded with that of the current municipalities Patras, Erymanthos and West Achaea, and the municipal unit Erineos. It was abolished in 2006.

== Subdivisions ==
The Patras province was subdivided into the following municipalities and communities (situation after the 1997 Kapodistrias reform):

- Dymi
- Erineos
- Farres
- Kalentzi (community)
- Larissos
- Leontio
- Messatida
- Movri
- Olenia
- Paralia
- Patras
- Rio
- Tritaia
- Vrachnaiika
