= Olympia Province =

Coordinates: 37.52°N 21.78°E

Olympia Province Επαρχία Ολυμπίας
- Province of Greece
- 1828–1997
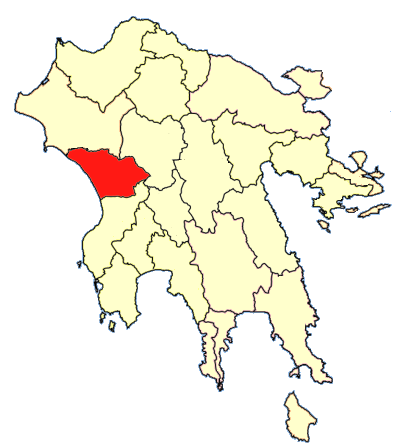
- Capital: Andritsaina
- History
  - Tenth Resolution of the National Assembly: 1828
  - Law 2539/1997: 1997

Olympia Province (Greek: Επαρχία Ολυμπίας) was one of the provinces of the Elis Prefecture, Greece. Its territory corresponded with that of the current municipalities Andritsaina-Krestena and Zacharo, and the municipal unit Volakas. It was abolished in 1997.
