= Vonitsa-Xiromero =

Coordinates: 38.72°N 20.96°E

Vonitsa-Xiromero Province Επαρχία Βονίτσης και Ξηρομέρου
- Province of Greece
- 2006
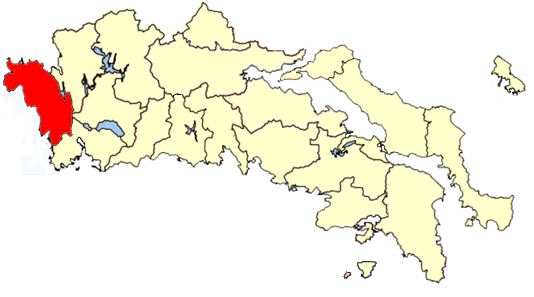
- Capital: Vonitsa

Vonitsa-Xiromero was one of the provinces of the Aetolia-Acarnania Prefecture, Greece. Its territory corresponded with that of the current municipalities Aktio-Vonitsa and Xiromero, and part of the municipal unit Oiniades. It was abolished in 2006.
