= Dodoni Province =

Dodoni Province Επαρχία Δωδώνης
- Province of Greece
- 2006
- Capital: Ioannina

Dodoni Province was the largest of the four provinces of Ioannina Prefecture of Greece. Its territory corresponded with that of the current municipalities Dodoni, Ioannina, North Tzoumerka, Zagori and Zitsa, and the municipal units Ano Kalamas, Egnatia (partly) and Kalpaki. It was abolished in 2006.
