= Kainourgio =

Former province of the Heraklion Prefecture, Greece

Kainourgio Province Επαρχία Καινούργιου
- Province of Greece
- 2006
- Capital: Moires

Kainourgio was one of the provinces of the Heraklion Prefecture, Crete, Greece. Its territory corresponded with that of the current municipal units Gortyna, Moires, Rouvas and Zaros. It was abolished in 2006.
