= Karystia =

Karystia Province Επαρχία Καρυστίας
- Province of Greece
- 2006
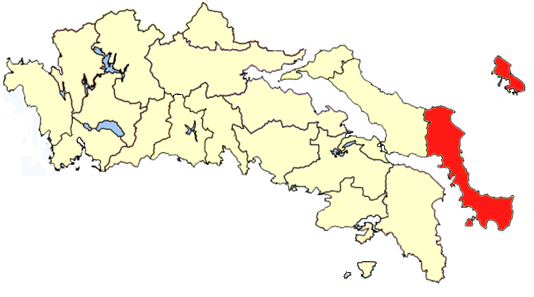
- Capital: Karystos

Karystia was one of the provinces of the Euboea Prefecture, Greece. Its territory corresponded with that of the current municipalities Karystos, Kymi-Aliveri, and Skyros. It was abolished in 2006.
