= Pediada =

Pediada Province Επαρχία Πεδιάδος
- Province of Greece
- 2006

Pediada (Greek: Πεδιάδα, "plain") is a region and former province of Heraklion Prefecture, Crete, Greece. Its territory corresponded with that of the current municipality Chersonisos, the municipal units Kastelli and Thrapsano, and parts of the municipal units Nikos Kazantzakis and Viannos. It was abolished in 2006.
