= Lagkadas Province =

Coordinates: 40.751386°N 23.069565°E

Lagkadas Province Επαρχία Λαγκαδά
- Province of Greece
- 2006
- Capital: Lagkadas

Lagkadas Province was one of the two provinces of Thessaloniki Prefecture of Greece. Its territory corresponded with that of the current municipalities Lagkadas and Volvi. It was abolished in 2006.
