= Thessaloniki Province =

Coordinates: 40.64053°N 22.944403°E

Thessaloniki Province Επαρχία Θεσσαλονίκης
- Province of Greece
- 2006
- Capital: Thessaloniki

Thessaloniki Province was one of the two provinces of Thessaloniki Prefecture of Greece. Its territory corresponded with that of the current municipalities Ampelokipoi-Menemeni, Chalkidona, Delta, Kalamaria, Kordelio-Evosmos, Neapoli-Sykies, Oraiokastro, Pavlos Melas, Pylaia-Chortiatis, Thermaikos, Thermi and Thessaloniki. It was abolished in 2006.
