= Nafplia Province =

Province of Argolis Prefecture, Greece

Nafplia Province Επαρχία Ναυπλίας
- Province of Greece
- 2006
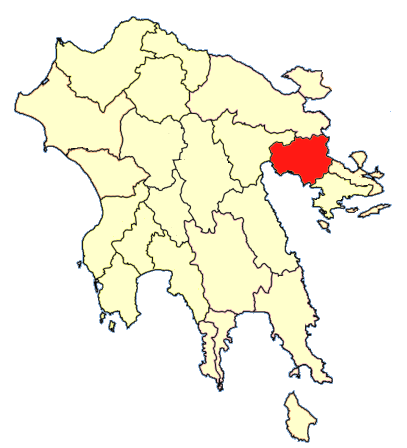
- Capital: Nafplio

Nafplia Province was one of the provinces of the Argolis Prefecture, Greece. Its territory corresponded with that of the current municipalities Nafplio and Epidaurus. It was abolished in 2006.
