= Agia Varvara (island) =

Island in Greece

Native name: Αγία Βαρβάρα
- Location within Greece

Geography
- Coordinates: 35.2976°N 25.4678°E
- Archipelago: Cretan Islands

Administration
- Greece
- Region: Crete
- Regional unit: Heraklion
- Capital city: Heraklion

Agia Varvara (Greek: Αγία Βαρβάρα, "Saint Barbara") is a small islet off the northern coast of the Greek island of Crete in the Aegean Sea. (Note: /iˈdʒiːən/, ee-JEE-ən; Greek: Αιγαίο Πέλαγος, romanized: Eyéo Pélagos [eˈʝeo ˈpelaɣos]; Turkish: Ege Denizi [eˈɟe deniˈzi]) It is a short distance from the islet of Afentis Christos at Malia. The islet is administered from Malia in Heraklion regional unit.

== See also ==
- List of islands of Greece
