= Thyamida =

Province of Thesprotia Prefecture, Greece

Coordinates: 39.58717°N 20.142374°E

Thyamida Province Επαρχία Θυάμιδος
- Province of Greece
- 2006
- Capital: Igoumenitsa

Thyamida was one of the four provinces of Thesprotia Prefecture of Greece. Its territory corresponded with that of the current municipality Igoumenitsa, except the municipal units Margariti and Perdika. Its seat was the town Igoumenitsa. It was abolished in 2006.
