= Viannos =

Viannos Βιάννος
- Municipality
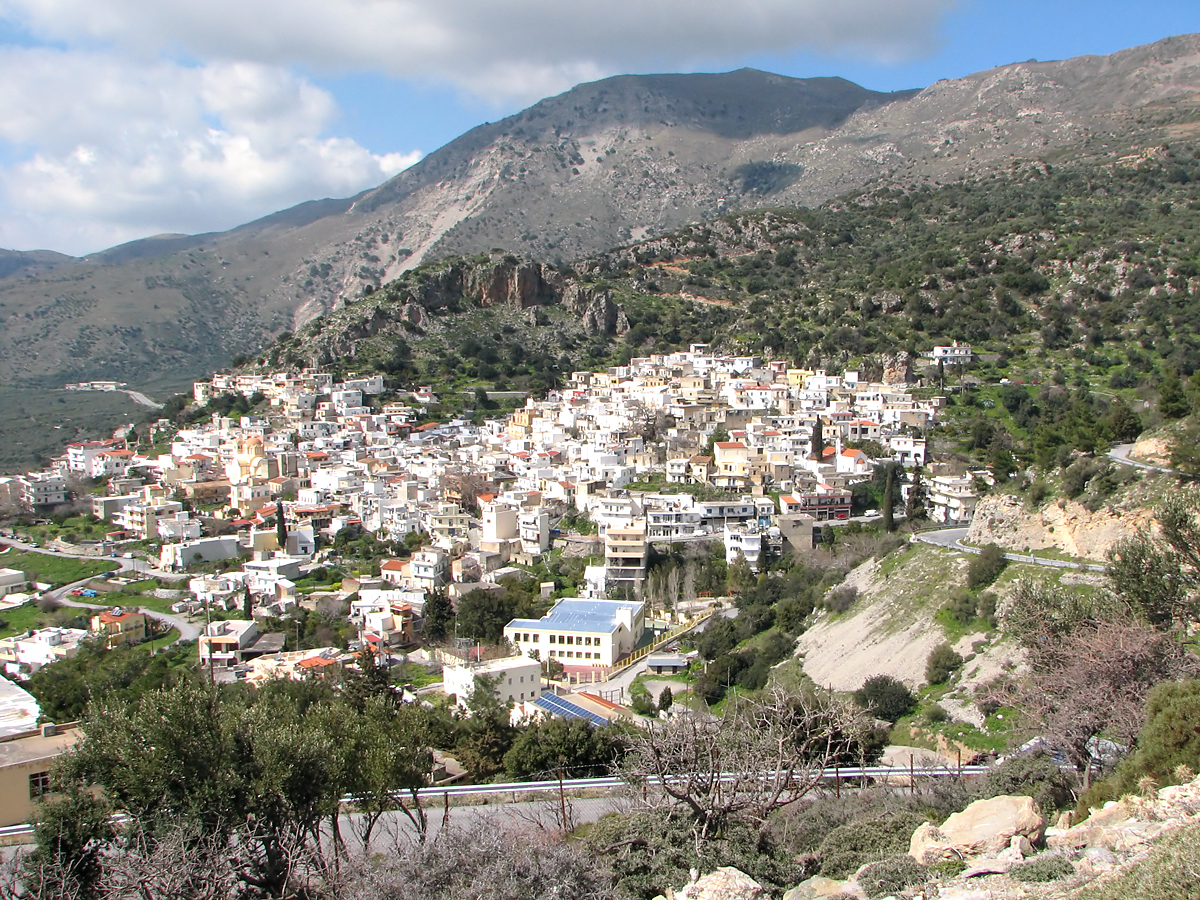
- Ano Viannos

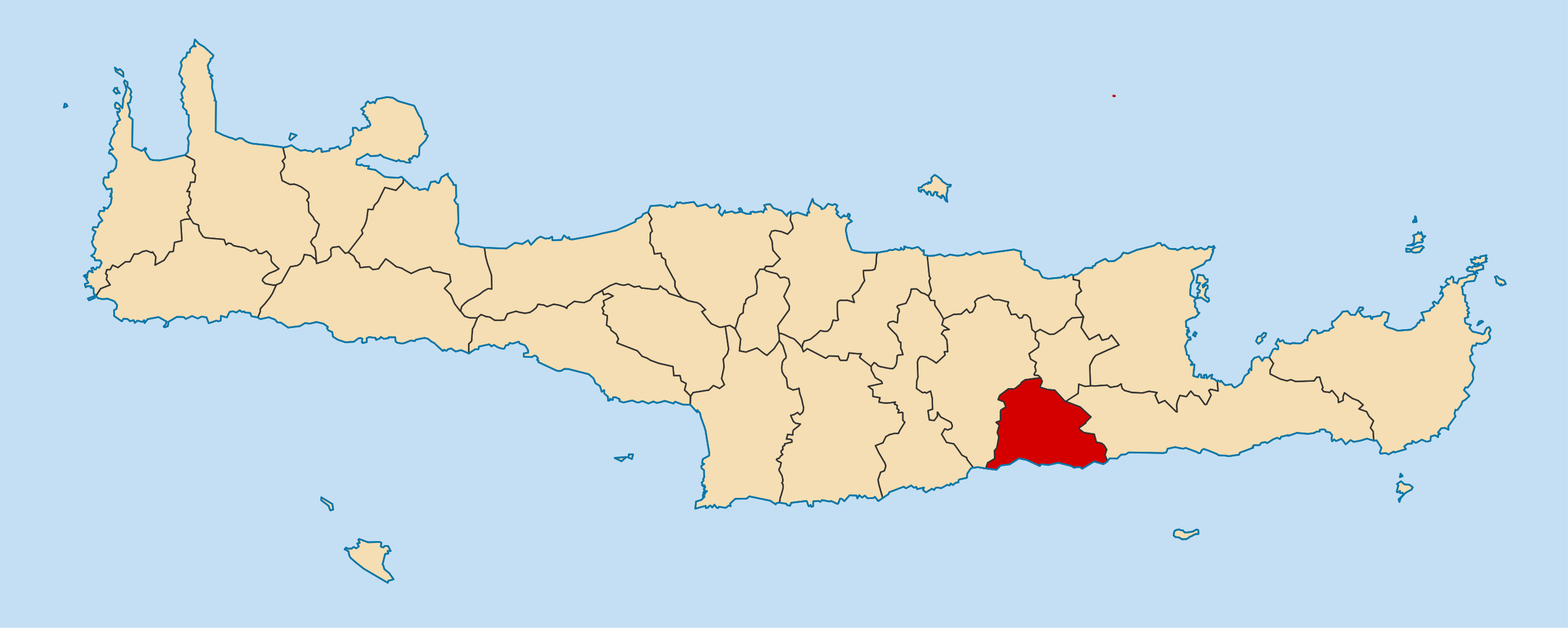

- Location within Greece
- Coordinates: 35°03′N 25°25′E
- Country: Greece
- Administrative region: Crete
- Regional unit: Heraklion
- Seat: Ano Viannos

Area
  - Municipality: 221.5 km^{2} (85.5 sq mi)

Population (2021)
  - Municipality: 4,436
  - Density: 20.03/km^{2} (51.87/sq mi)
- Time zone: UTC+2 (EET)
  - Summer (DST): UTC+3 (EEST)

Viannos (Greek: Βιάννος) is a municipality in the Heraklion regional unit, Crete, Greece. The municipality has an area of 221.539 km^{2} (85.537 sq mi). Population 4,436 (2021). The seat of the municipality is in Ano Viannos.

In September 1943, German occupation forces inflicted heavy loss of life and property on the region of Viannos in reprisal for its support of the Cretan resistance.

In late July 2012, the area was hit by wildfires which caused severe damage in crops and livestock.

== Province ==
The province of Viannos (Greek: Επαρχία Βιάννου) was one of the provinces of the Heraklion Prefecture. Its territory corresponded with that of the current municipality Viannos, except a few villages that were part of the province Pediada. It was abolished in 2006.
