= Parnassida =

Former province of Phocis, Greece

Parnassida Province Επαρχία Παρνασσίδας
- Province of Greece
- 2006
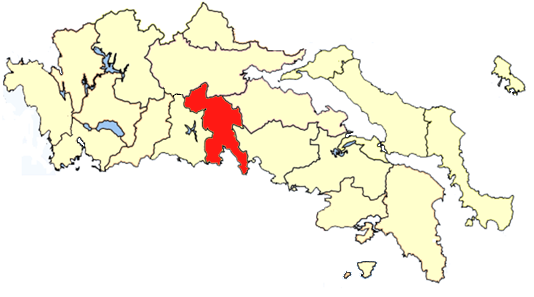
- Capital: Amfissa

Parnassida (Greek: Παρνασσίδα) was one of the provinces of the Phocis Prefecture, Greece, encompassing the area around Mount Parnassus. It was abolished in 2006.

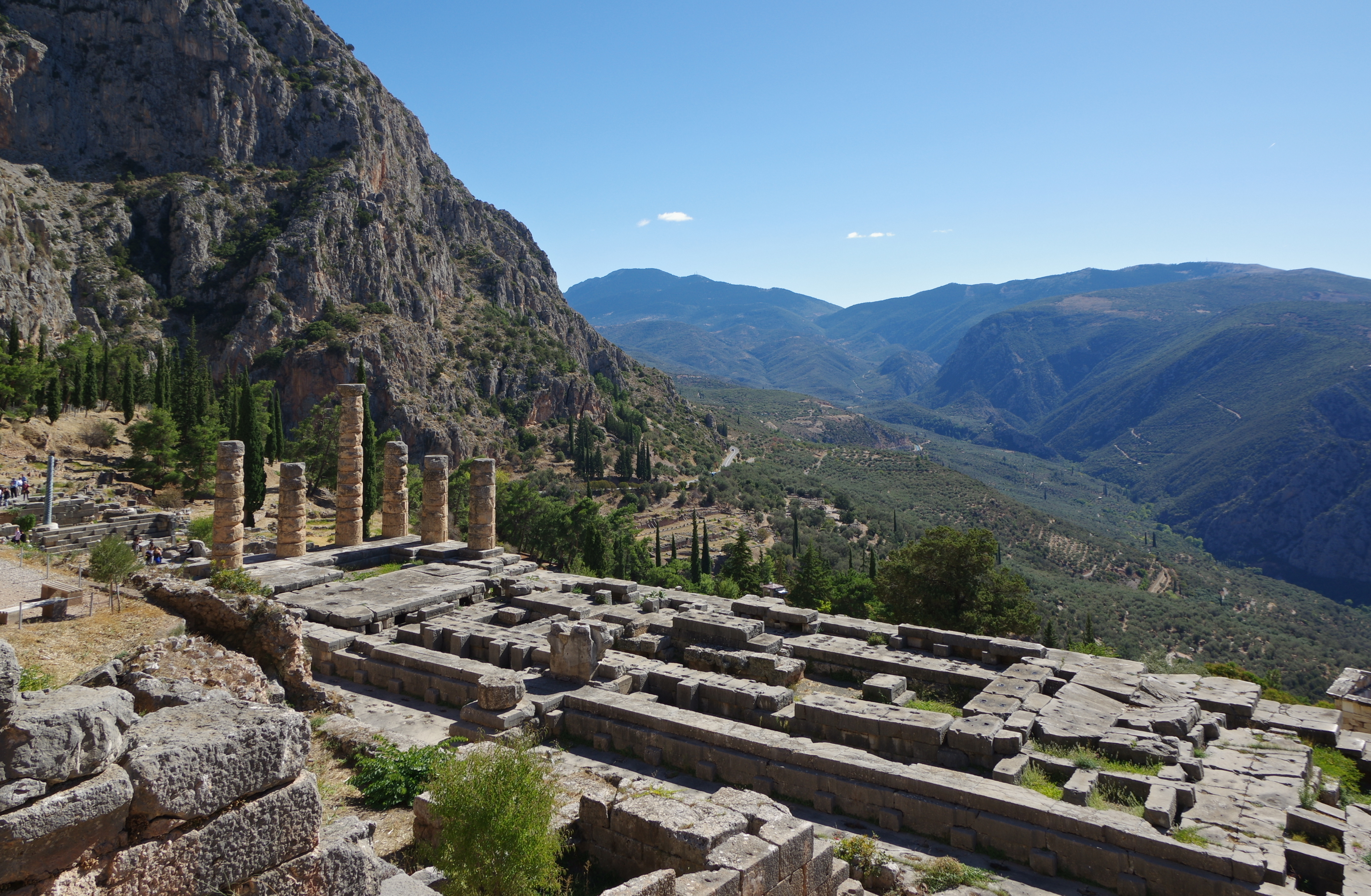
Temple of Apollo

Its territory corresponded with that of the current municipality of Delphi.
