= Chalcis Province =

Chalcis Province Επαρχία Χαλκίδας
- Province of Greece
- 2006
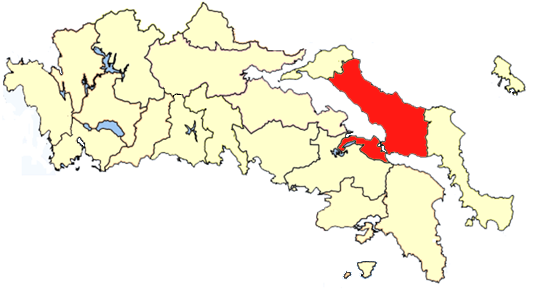
- Capital: Chalcis

Chalcis Province was one of the provinces of the Euboea Prefecture, Greece. Its territory corresponded with that of the current municipalities Chalcis, Dirfys-Messapia, Eretria, and Mantoudi-Limni-Agia Anna. It was abolished in 2006.
