= Thebes Province =

Province of the Boeotia Prefecture, Greece

Thebes Province Επαρχία Θηβών
- Province of Greece
- 2006
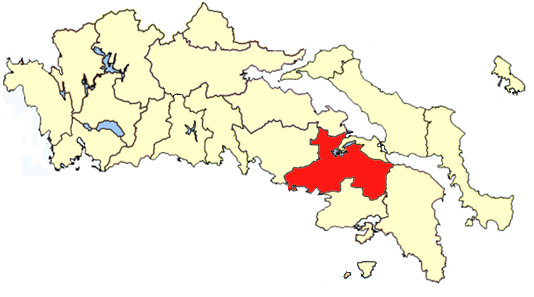

Thebes Province was one of the provinces of the Boeotia Prefecture, Greece. Its territory corresponded with that of the current municipalities Tanagra and Thebes and the municipal units Thespies and Akraifnia. It was abolished in 2006.
