= Arnaia Province =

Province of Greece

Coordinates: 40.486828°N 23.596419°E

Arnaia Province Επαρχία Αρναίας
- Province of Greece
- 2006
- Capital: Arnaia

Arnaia Province was one of the provinces of the Chalkidiki Prefecture, Greece. Its territory corresponded with that of the current municipality Aristotelis. It was abolished in 2006.
