= Piraeus Province =

Piraeus Province Επαρχία Πειραιώς
- Province of Greece
- 2006

The province of Piraeus (Greek: Επαρχία Πειραιώς) was one of the provinces of the Piraeus Prefecture. Its territory corresponded with that of the current municipalities Salamis and Spetses. It was abolished in 2006.
