= Temenos, Greece =

Temenos Τέμενος
- Municipal unit
- Location within the regional unit

- Location within Greece
- Coordinates: 35°11′N 25°06′E
- Country: Greece
- Administrative region: Crete
- Regional unit: Heraklion
- Municipality: Heraklion

Area
  - Municipal unit: 56.6 km^{2} (21.9 sq mi)
- Elevation: 298 m (978 ft)

Population (2021)
  - Municipal unit: 3,421
  - Municipal unit density: 60.4/km^{2} (157/sq mi)
- Time zone: UTC+2 (EET)
  - Summer (DST): UTC+3 (EEST)

Temenos (Greek: Τέμενος) is a former municipality in the Heraklion Regional Unit, Crete, Greece. Since the 2011 local government reform it is part of the municipality Heraklion, of which it is a municipal unit. The municipal unit has an area of 56.608 km^{2}. Population 3,421 (2021). The seat of the municipality was in Profitis Ilias.

== Province ==
The province of Temenos (Greek: Επαρχία Τεμένους) was one of the provinces of the Heraklion Prefecture. Its territory corresponded with that of the current municipality Heraklion (except the municipal unit Gorgolainis and a few other villages) and the municipal unit Archanes. It was abolished in 2006.
