= Paliani =

Paliani Παλιανή
- Municipal unit
- Location within the regional unit

- Location within Greece
- Coordinates: 35°12′N 25°02′E
- Country: Greece
- Administrative region: Crete
- Regional unit: Heraklion
- Municipality: Heraklion

Area
  - Municipal unit: 21.4 km^{2} (8.3 sq mi)
- Elevation: 306 m (1,004 ft)

Population (2021)
  - Municipal unit: 1,890
  - Municipal unit density: 88.3/km^{2} (229/sq mi)
- Time zone: UTC+2 (EET)
  - Summer (DST): UTC+3 (EEST)

Paliani (Greek: Παλιανή) is a former municipality in the Heraklion regional unit, Crete, Greece. Since the 2011 local government reform it is part of the municipality Heraklion, of which it is a municipal unit. The municipal unit has an area of 21.423 km^{2}. Population 1,890 (2021). The seat of the municipality was in Venerato. Until 2002, the municipality was named "Tetrachori".

The municipal unit of Paliani, named after the nunnery on the outskirts of Venerato, consists of the villages of Kerasia, Venerato, Avgeniki, and Siva.
