= Creta Channel =

Regional television station in Crete, Greece

Creta Channel (or TV Creta) is a private regional television channel based in Heraklion and broadcast to the majority of Crete. Its programming is split between TV shopping and entertainment and cultural content.
