= Trichonida Province =

Coordinates: 38.66°N 21.56°E

Trichonida Province Επαρχία Τριχωνίδας
- Province of Greece
- 2006
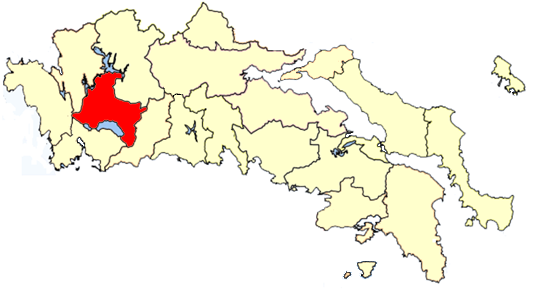
- Capital: Agrinio

Trichonida Province was one of the provinces of the Aetolia-Acarnania Prefecture, Greece. Its territory corresponded with that of the current municipalities Agrinio (except the municipal units Angelokastro, Arakynthos, Makryneia and Stratos) and Thermo. It was abolished in 2006.
