= Rouvas =

Rouvas Ρούβας
- Municipal unit
- Location within the regional unit

- Location within Greece
- Coordinates: 35°08′N 24°56′E
- Country: Greece
- Administrative region: Crete
- Regional unit: Heraklion
- Municipality: Gortyn

Area
  - Municipal unit: 62.7 km^{2} (24.2 sq mi)

Population (2021)
  - Municipal unit: 1,713
  - Municipal unit density: 27.3/km^{2} (70.8/sq mi)
- Time zone: UTC+2 (EET)
  - Summer (DST): UTC+3 (EEST)

Rouvas (Greek: Ρούβας) is a former municipality in the Heraklion regional unit, Crete, Greece. Since the 2011 local government reform it is part of the municipality Gortyn, of which it is a municipal unit. The municipal unit has an area of 62.725 km^{2} (24.218 sq mi). Population 1,713 (2021). The seat of the municipality was in Gergeri.
