= Mirabello Province =

Coordinates: 35.23°N 25.63°E

Mirampello Province Επαρχία Μιραμπέλλου
- Province of Greece
- 2006
- Capital: Neapoli

Mirampello was one of the 4 provinces in Lasithi Prefecture of Greece. Its territory corresponded with that of the current municipality Agios Nikolaos, except the village Exo Potamoi. It was abolished in 2006.
