= Archanes-Asterousia =

Archanes–Asterousia Αρχάνες-Αστερούσια
- Municipality
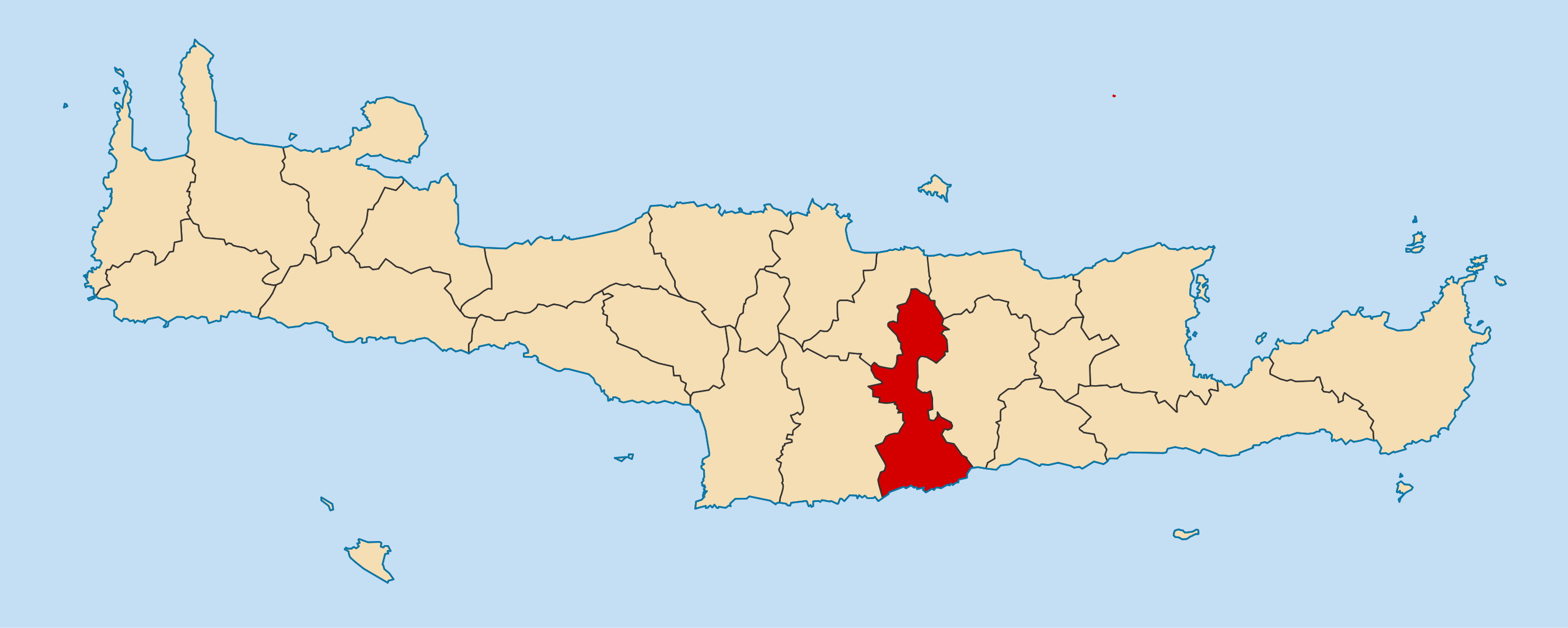

- Location within Greece
- Coordinates: 35°14′N 25°10′E
- Country: Greece
- Administrative region: Crete
- Regional unit: Heraklion

Area
  - Municipality: 337.1 km^{2} (130.2 sq mi)

Population (2021)
  - Municipality: 16,072
  - Density: 47.68/km^{2} (123.5/sq mi)
- Time zone: UTC+2 (EET)
  - Summer (DST): UTC+3 (EEST)

Archanes–Asterousia (Greek: Αρχάνες-Αστερούσια) is a municipality in Heraklion regional unit, Crete, Greece. The seat of the municipality is the village Peza. The municipality has an area of 337,137 square kilometres (130,169 mi^{2}).

== Municipality ==
Archanes–Asterousia was formed at the 2011 local government reform by the merger of the following 3 former municipalities that became municipal units:

- Archanes
- Asterousia
- Nikos Kazantzakis
