= Pyrgiotissa =

Province in Greece

Pyrgiotissa Province Επαρχία Πυργιωτίσσης
- Province of Greece
- 2006
- Capital: Voroi

Pyrgiotissa was a province of Heraklion Prefecture, Crete, Greece. Its territory corresponded with that of the current municipal unit Tympaki. It was abolished in 2006.
