= Nikos Kazantzakis (municipality) =

Nikos Kazantzakis Νίκος Καζαντζάκης
- Municipal unit
- Location within the regional unit

- Location within Greece
- Coordinates: 35°14′N 25°10′E
- Country: Greece
- Administrative region: Crete
- Regional unit: Heraklion
- Municipality: Archanes-Asterousia

Area
  - Municipal unit: 102.2 km^{2} (39.5 sq mi)

Population (2021)
  - Municipal unit: 6,065
  - Municipal unit density: 59.34/km^{2} (153.7/sq mi)
- Time zone: UTC+2 (EET)
  - Summer (DST): UTC+3 (EEST)

Nikos Kazantzakis (Greek: Νίκος Καζαντζάκης) is a former municipality in the Heraklion regional unit, Crete, Greece. Since the 2011 local government reform it is part of the municipality Archanes-Asterousia, of which it is a municipal unit. It was named after the writer Nikos Kazantzakis. The municipal unit has an area of 102.201 km^{2} (39.460 sq mi). Population 6,065 (2021). The seat of the municipality was in Peza.

Heraklion International Airport has also been named after Nikos Kazantzakis.
