= Arnaia =

Town in Chalkidiki, Greece

Arnaia Αρναία
- Municipal unit
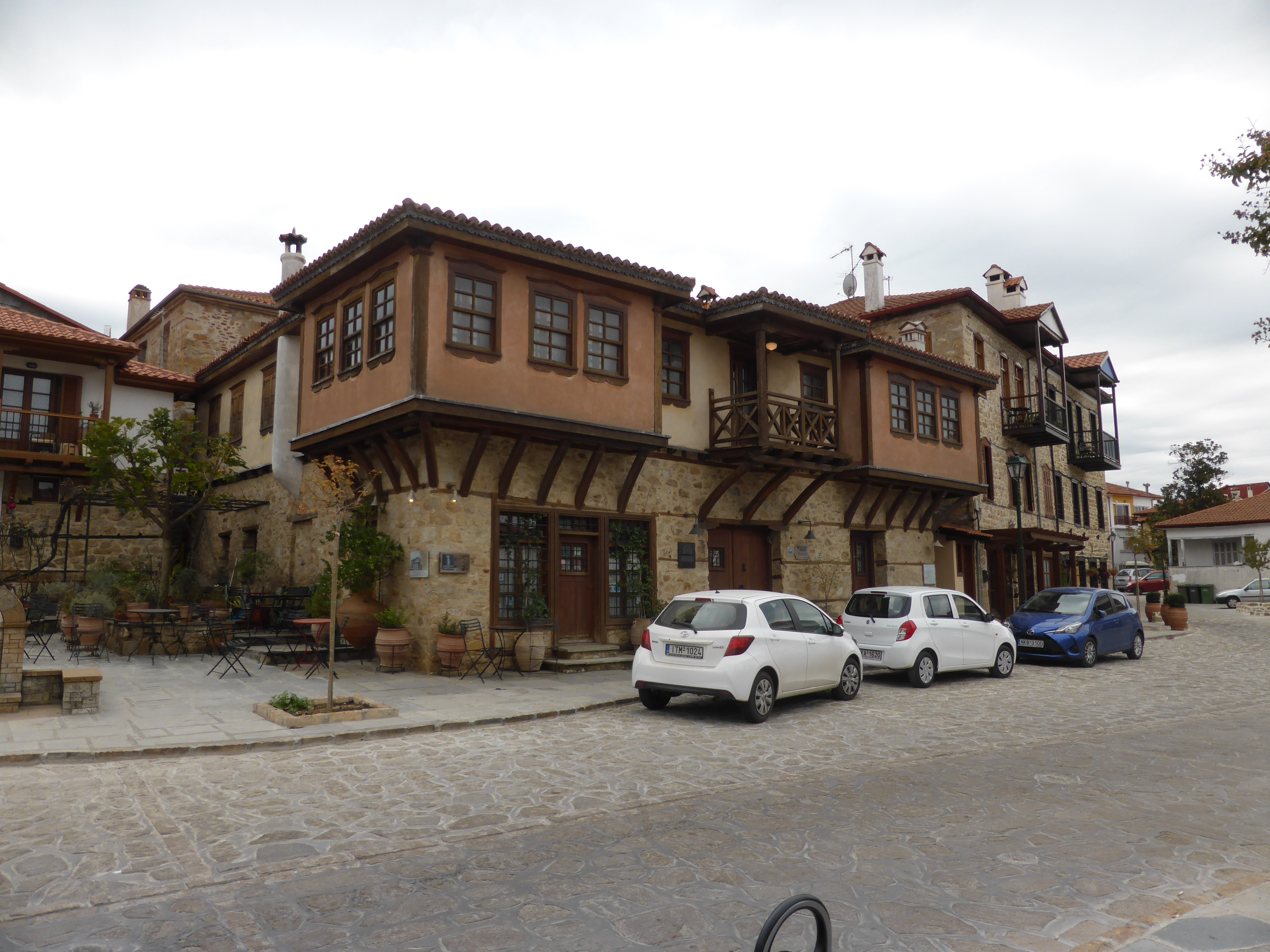
- Street in Arnaia

- Location within the regional unit

- Location within Greece
- Coordinates: 40°29′N 23°36′E
- Country: Greece
- Administrative region: Central Macedonia
- Regional unit: Chalkidiki
- Municipality: Aristotelis

Area
  - Municipal unit: 288.739 km^{2} (111.483 sq mi)
- Elevation: 600 m (2,000 ft)

Population (2021)
  - Municipal unit: 5,564
  - Municipal unit density: 19.27/km^{2} (49.91/sq mi)
  - Community: 2,159
- Time zone: UTC+2 (EET)
  - Summer (DST): UTC+3 (EEST)
- Postal code: 631 00
- Area code: 23710
- Vehicle registration: ΧΚ

Arnaia (Greek: Αρναία, before 1928: Λιαρίγκοβη - Liarigkovi, or Lerigovo) is a town and a former municipality in Chalkidiki, Greece. Since the 2011 local government reform it is part of the municipality Aristotelis, of which it is a municipal unit. The municipal unit has an area of 288.739 km^{2}. The city's population is 5,564 as of 2021. The History and Folklore Museum of Arnaia is located in the town.

== Subdivisions ==
Subdivisions of the municipal unit (population in 2011 between square brackets):

- Arnaia [ 2,159 ]
- Varvara [ 539 ]
- Neochori [ 696 ]
- Palaiochori [ 1,262 ]
- Stanos [ 908 ]
