= Meniida =

Meniida Μενηίδα
- Municipal unit
- Location within the regional unit

- Location within Greece
- Coordinates: 40°51′N 22°11′E
- Country: Greece
- Administrative region: Central Macedonia
- Regional unit: Pella
- Municipality: Skydra

Area
  - Municipal unit: 118.6 km^{2} (45.8 sq mi)

Population (2021)
  - Municipal unit: 3,972
  - Municipal unit density: 33.49/km^{2} (86.74/sq mi)
- Time zone: UTC+2 (EET)
  - Summer (DST): UTC+3 (EEST)
- Vehicle registration: ΕΕ

Meniida (Greek: Μενηίδα) is a former municipality in the Pella regional unit, Greece. Since the 2011 local government reform, it is part of the municipality Skydra, of which it is a municipal unit. The municipal unit has an area of 118.562 km^{2}. Population 3,972 (2021). The seat of the municipality was in Kali.

== Subdivisions ==
The 6 communities of Meniida are:

Map	Community	Population (2021)
Map of the municipal unit of Meniida in Pella.
Map of the municipal unit of Meniida in Pella.	Anydro	338
Map of the municipal unit of Meniida in Pella.	Kali	1,222
Map of the municipal unit of Meniida in Pella.	Kallipoli (incl. Sandali)	516
Map of the municipal unit of Meniida in Pella.	Kranea (incl. Litharia)	64
Map of the municipal unit of Meniida in Pella.	Mandalo	941
Map of the municipal unit of Meniida in Pella.	Profitis Ilias	890
Map of the municipal unit of Meniida in Pella.	Municipal unit of Meniida	3,972

=== Historical Population ===
Year	Population
2001	5,493
2011	4,575
2021	3,792
