= Asterousia =

Asterousia Αστερούσια
- Municipal unit
- Location within the regional unit

- Location within Greece
- Coordinates: 35°00′N 25°12′E
- Country: Greece
- Administrative region: Crete
- Regional unit: Heraklion
- Municipality: Archanes-Asterousia

Area
  - Municipal unit: 203.4 km^{2} (78.5 sq mi)

Population (2021)
  - Municipal unit: 4,943
  - Municipal unit density: 24.30/km^{2} (62.94/sq mi)
- Time zone: UTC+2 (EET)
  - Summer (DST): UTC+3 (EEST)

Asterousia (Greek: Αστερούσια) is a former municipality in the Heraklion regional unit, Crete, Greece. Since the 2011 local government reform it is part of the municipality Archanes-Asterousia, of which it is a municipal unit. The municipal unit has an area of 203.420 km^{2} (78.541 sq mi). Population 4,943 (2021). The seat of the municipality was in Pyrgos. Other villages include Charakas.
