= Agia Varvara, Heraklion =

Agia Varvara Αγία Βαρβάρα
- Municipal unit
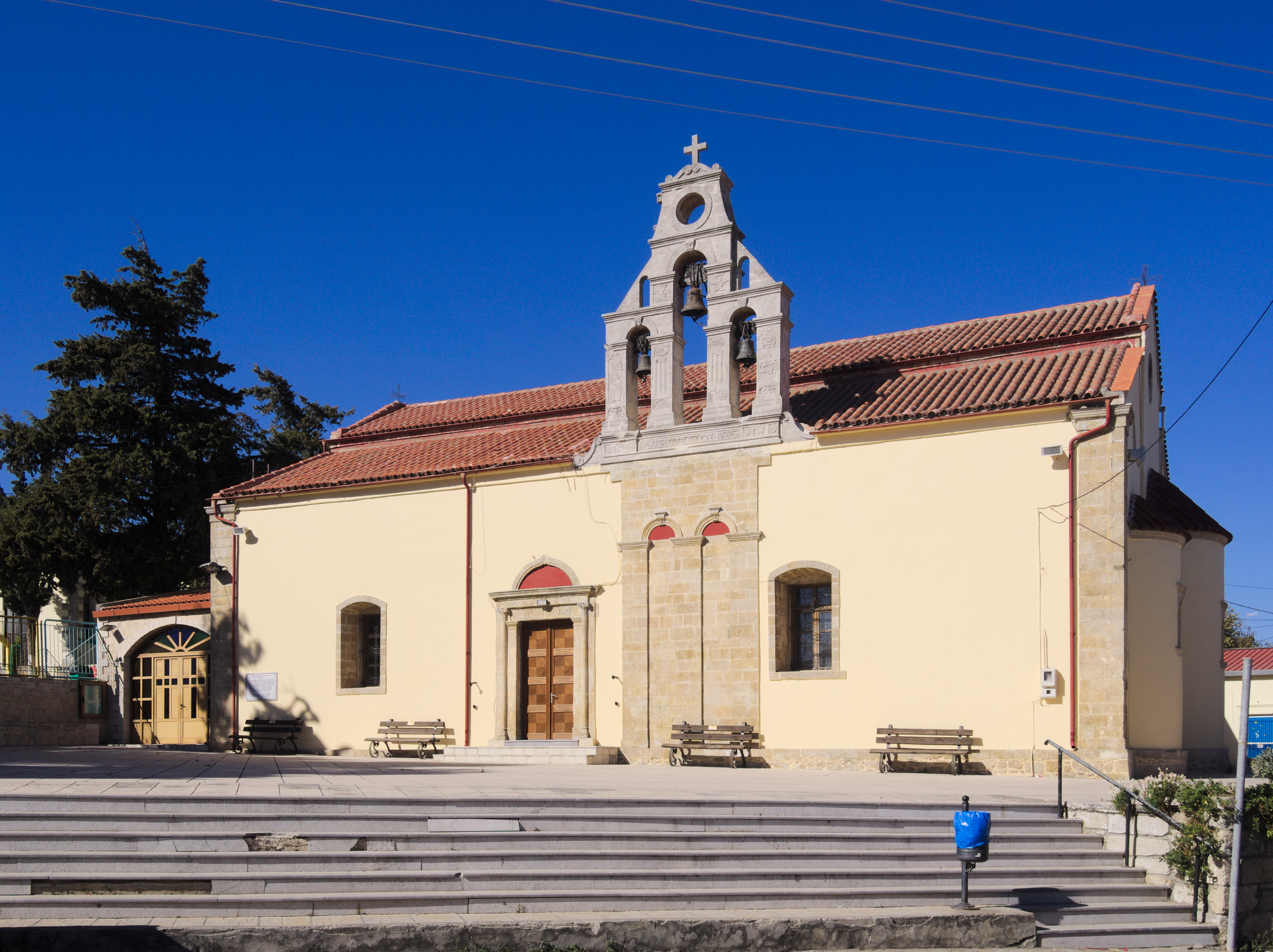
- The church of Agia Varvara

- Location within the regional unit

- Location within Greece
- Coordinates: 35°08′N 25°00′E
- Country: Greece
- Administrative region: Crete
- Regional unit: Heraklion
- Municipality: Gortyn

Area
  - Municipal unit: 99.0 km^{2} (38.2 sq mi)
- Elevation: 580 m (1,900 ft)

Population (2021)
  - Municipal unit: 4,241
  - Municipal unit density: 42.8/km^{2} (111/sq mi)
  - Community: 2,096
- Time zone: UTC+2 (EET)
  - Summer (DST): UTC+3 (EEST)

Agia Varvara (Greek: Αγία Βαρβάρα) is a village and a former municipality in the Heraklion regional unit, Crete, Greece. Since the 2011 local government reform it is part of the municipality Gortyn, of which it is a municipal unit. The municipal unit has an area of 99.038 km^{2} (38.239 sq mi). Population 4,241 (2021). The village lies at an altitude of about 580 meters and has 2,096 inhabitants.

Agia Varvara lies on the busy north–south road from Heraklion on the north coast of the island towards the centre.
