= Heraklion (regional unit) =

Heraklion Περιφερειακή ενότητα Ηρακλείου
- Regional unit
- Municipalities of Heraklion

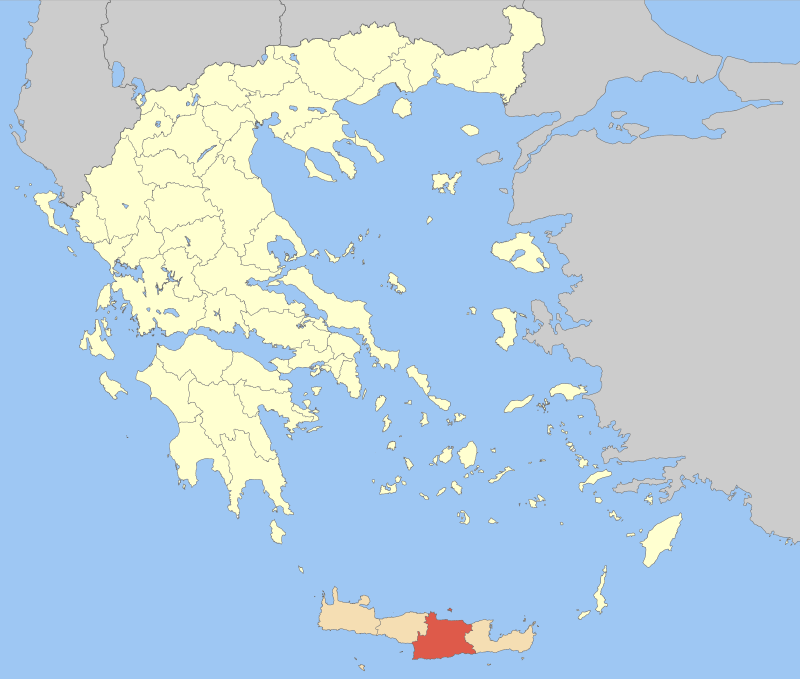
- Heraklion within Greece

- Location within Greece
- Coordinates: 35°10′N 25°10′E
- Country: Greece
- Administrative region: Crete
- Seat: Heraklion

Area
  - Total: 2,641 km^{2} (1,020 sq mi)

Population (2021)
  - Total: 303,017
  - Density: 114.7/km^{2} (297.2/sq mi)
- Time zone: UTC+2 (EET)
  - Summer (DST): UTC+3 (EEST)
- Postal code: 70x xx, 71x xx
- Area code: 2810, 289x0
- Vehicle registration: HK, HP, HZ
- Website: www.nah.gr

Heraklion (Greek: Περιφερειακή ενότητα Ηρακλείου) is one of the four regional units of Crete. The capital is the city of Heraklion.

== Geography ==
The regional unit of Heraklion borders on the regional units of Rethymno to the west and Lasithi to the east. Farmlands are situated in the central and the northern parts, at the coast and in valleys. The mountains dominate the rest of the regional unit, notably the south. The main mountains are Mt Ida or Psiloritis to the southwest (reaching 2,456 metres), Mt Kouloukonas or Talea (reaching 1,084 metres) to the west, Mt Juktas near Heraklion (reaching 811 metres) and Asterousia in the south (reaching 1,231 metres). The regional unit includes the island of Dia to the north.

Except for the mountains which receive mild to cool winters unlike northern Greece, the warm to hot Mediterranean climate dominates the regional unit.

== Ancient history ==
Within the Heraklion regional unit's boundaries are a number of significant Neolithic and Minoan settlements, most notably the ancient palace complexes of Knossos and Phaistos. While both archaeological sites evince Neolithic habitation from 7000 BC, it is the rich finds of Minoan civilisation, which flourished approximately 2800 to 1450 BC, that command the greatest scholarly attention.

Important ancient cities are:

- Knossos
- Phaistos
- Hagia Triada
- Kommos
- Gortys
- Tylissos
- Malia
- Lyttos
- Amnisos
- Kaloi Limenes

== Population history ==
Historical population
| Year | Pop. | ±% |
|---|---|---|
| 1991 | 265,708 | — |
| 2001 | 291,225 | +9.6% |
| 2011 | 305,490 | +4.9% |
| 2021 | 305,017 | −0.2% |

== Administration ==
The regional unit Heraklion is subdivided into 8 municipalities. These are (number as in the map in the infobox):

- Archanes-Asterousia (2)
- Faistos (7)
- Gortyna (4)
- Heraklion (Irakleio, 1)
- Hersonissos (Chersonisos, 8)
- Malevizi (5)
- Minoa Pediada (6)
- Viannos (3)

=== Prefecture ===
The Heraklion prefecture (Greek: Νομός Ηρακλείου) was created in 1915, after Crete joined with the rest of Greece. As a part of the 2011 Kallikratis government reform, the regional unit Heraklion was created out of the former prefecture Heraklion. The prefecture had the same territory as the present regional unit. At the same time, the municipalities were reorganised, according to the table below.

| New municipality | Old municipalities | Seat |
|---|---|---|
| Archanes-Asterousia | Archanes | Peza |
| Archanes-Asterousia | Asterousia | Peza |
| Archanes-Asterousia | Nikos Kazantzakis | Peza |
| Faistos | Zaros | Moires |
| Faistos | Moires | Moires |
| Faistos | Tympaki | Moires |
| Gortyna | Gortyna | Agioi Deka |
| Gortyna | Agia Varvara | Agioi Deka |
| Gortyna | Kofinas | Agioi Deka |
| Gortyna | Rouvas | Agioi Deka |
| Heraklion (Irakleio) | Heraklion | Heraklion |
| Heraklion (Irakleio) | Gorgolainis | Heraklion |
| Heraklion (Irakleio) | Nea Alikarnassos | Heraklion |
| Heraklion (Irakleio) | Paliani | Heraklion |
| Heraklion (Irakleio) | Temenos | Heraklion |
| Hersonissos (Chersonisos) | Hersonissos | Gournes |
| Hersonissos (Chersonisos) | Episkopi | Gournes |
| Hersonissos (Chersonisos) | Gouves | Gournes |
| Hersonissos (Chersonisos) | Malia | Gournes |
| Malevizi | Gazi | Gazi |
| Malevizi | Krousonas | Gazi |
| Malevizi | Tylisos | Gazi |
| Minoa Pediada | Arkalochori | Evangelismos |
| Minoa Pediada | Thrapsano | Evangelismos |
| Minoa Pediada | Kasteli | Evangelismos |
| Viannos | Viannos | Ano Viannos |

=== Provinces ===
- Province of Pyrgiotissa - Voroi
- Province of Kainourgio - Moires
- Province of Malevizi - Agios Myronas
- Province of Temenos - Heraklion
- Province of Pediada - Kasteli
- Province of Monofatsi - Pyrgos
- Province of Viannos - Pefkos

Note: Provinces no longer hold any legal status in Greece.

== Transport ==
The main roads through the Heraklion regional unit are: the A90 motorway and expressway (part of European route E75 within the unit), which runs along the northern coast; the EO90, which runs mostly parallel to the A90; and the EO97 and EO99, which run from the city of Heraklion to Agia Galini and Knossos respectively. In addition, the EO92 is an airport road that connects the A90/EO90 (at Hersonissos) with Kasteli Air Base.

Heraklion International Airport is the main airport of the regional unit: it is expected to be replaced by Kasteli International Airport in 2028.

== Notable people ==
- El Greco (medieval Castilian nickname meaning "the Greek"), by which Δομήνικος Θεοτοκόπουλος Domênikos Theotokópoulos, is best known. (Born 1541, Fodele, Heraklion and died on April 7, 1614, Toledo, Spain), a world-famous painter, sculptor and architect
- Nikos Kazantzakis was born in the village Varvaro (renamed to Myrtia in 1965) The municipal unit in which Myrtia is located, was named after him.

== Communications ==
The following television channels serve the prefecture:

- Creta Channel
- Kriti TV

== See also ==
- List of settlements in the Heraklion regional unit
