= Palaiokastro, Heraklion =

Village on the Greek island of Crete

Palaiokastro Παλαιόκαστρο
- Settlement
- Location within Greece
- Coordinates: 35°21′N 25°2′E
- Country: Greece
- Administrative region: Crete
- Regional unit: Heraklion
- Municipality: Malevizi
- Municipal unit: Gazi
- Community: Rodia

Population (2021)
  - Total: 266
- Time zone: UTC+2 (EET)
  - Summer (DST): UTC+3 (EEST)
- Postal code: 71500
- Area code: 281084

Palaiokastro (Greek: Παλαιόκαστρο) is a coastal village and a community in the municipality of Malevizi. 9 km west of Heraklion on the island of Crete. It is situated in front of a 70 meter long pebbled beach leading to a cove with rapidly deepening waters that are protected from the prevailing northerly winds. On the southern end of the beach rises a steep calcareous rock. During the Venetian occupation of Crete extensive fortifications were built on this rock, housing cannons that secured the bay of Heraklion. Ruins of the fortress walls survive until today.

== Population ==
Year	Population
2001	110
2011	255
2021	266

== Venetian fortress of Palaiokastro ==
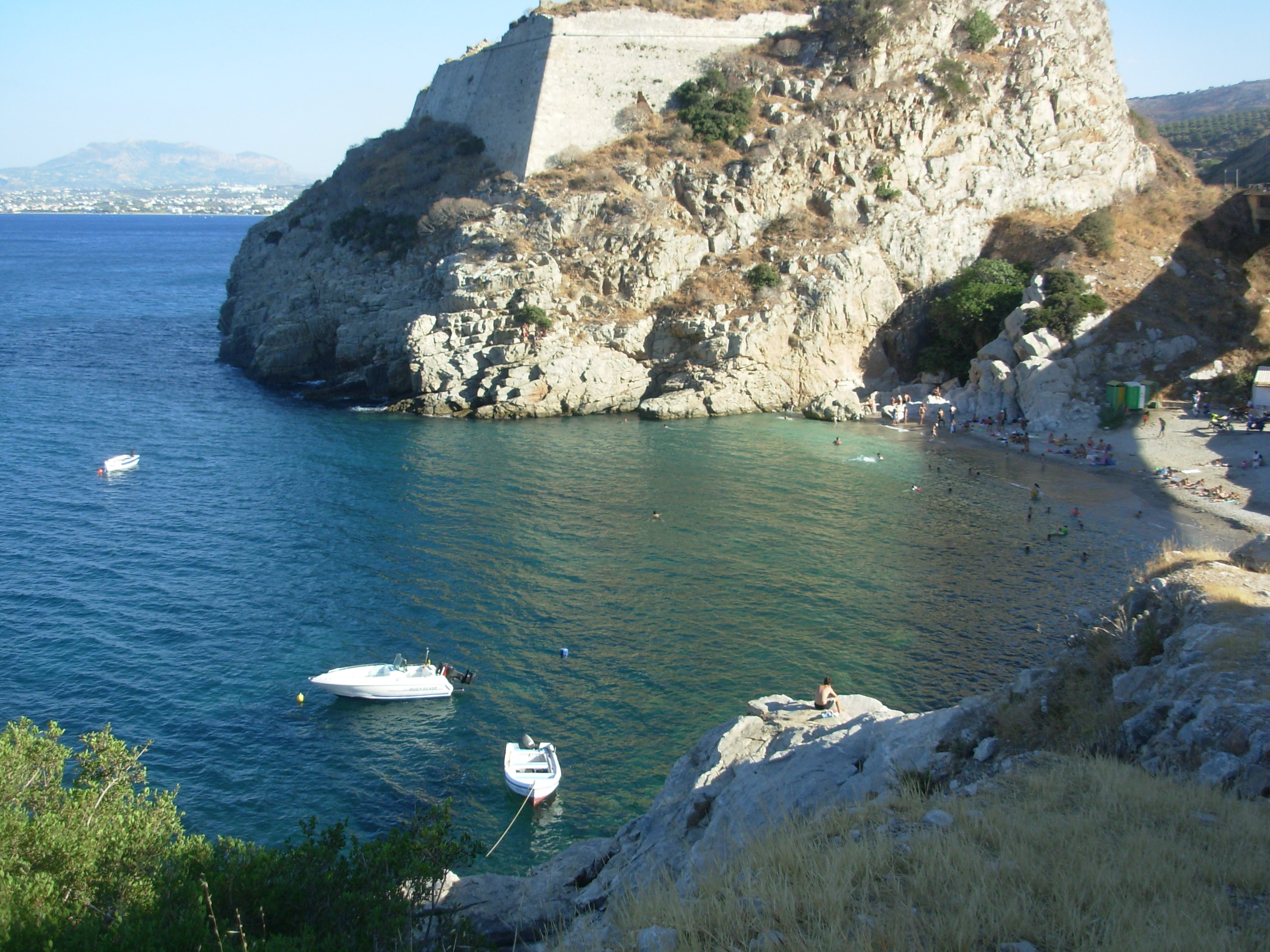
View of the rock and the northeast wall of the castle

The Venetian fortress of Palaiokastro is located 9 km west of Heraklion, on the west side of Heraklion Bay. Today, only a part of the walls of the triangular fort remains. The fort was built on a high rock, near the modern Heraklion - Chania highway.

In 1204, when the Genoese pirate Enrico Pescatore conquered Crete, he built 14 forts in order to protect it. Among them was the fort of Palaiokastro, which could protect the bay of Heraklion and make the landing of enemy on the nearby shores very difficult. The Genoeses thought that this castle was very important, thus when the Venetians managed to conquer Crete, they kept only this castle. Later, in 1211, they had to leave the island.

Palaiokastro fortress is one of the most important medieval monuments of the island. In approximately the same position existed an older fortress built by Enrico Pescatore, immediately after the conquest of Crete by the Genoese in the early 13th century. The Palaiokastro fortress built later is an integral element of the fortifications of Candia and was built when it became clear that the fortress of Candia could not effectively prevent the penetration of enemy ships in the adjacent bay of Fraskia. Construction of Palaiokastro fortress begun in 1573, was completed in 1595 and was based on a design prepared based instruction Commander Latino Orsini. The fort has triangular shape adopted by the natural topography of the location and the steepness of the rock was met with the overshoot of the walls that were parallel to the sea.

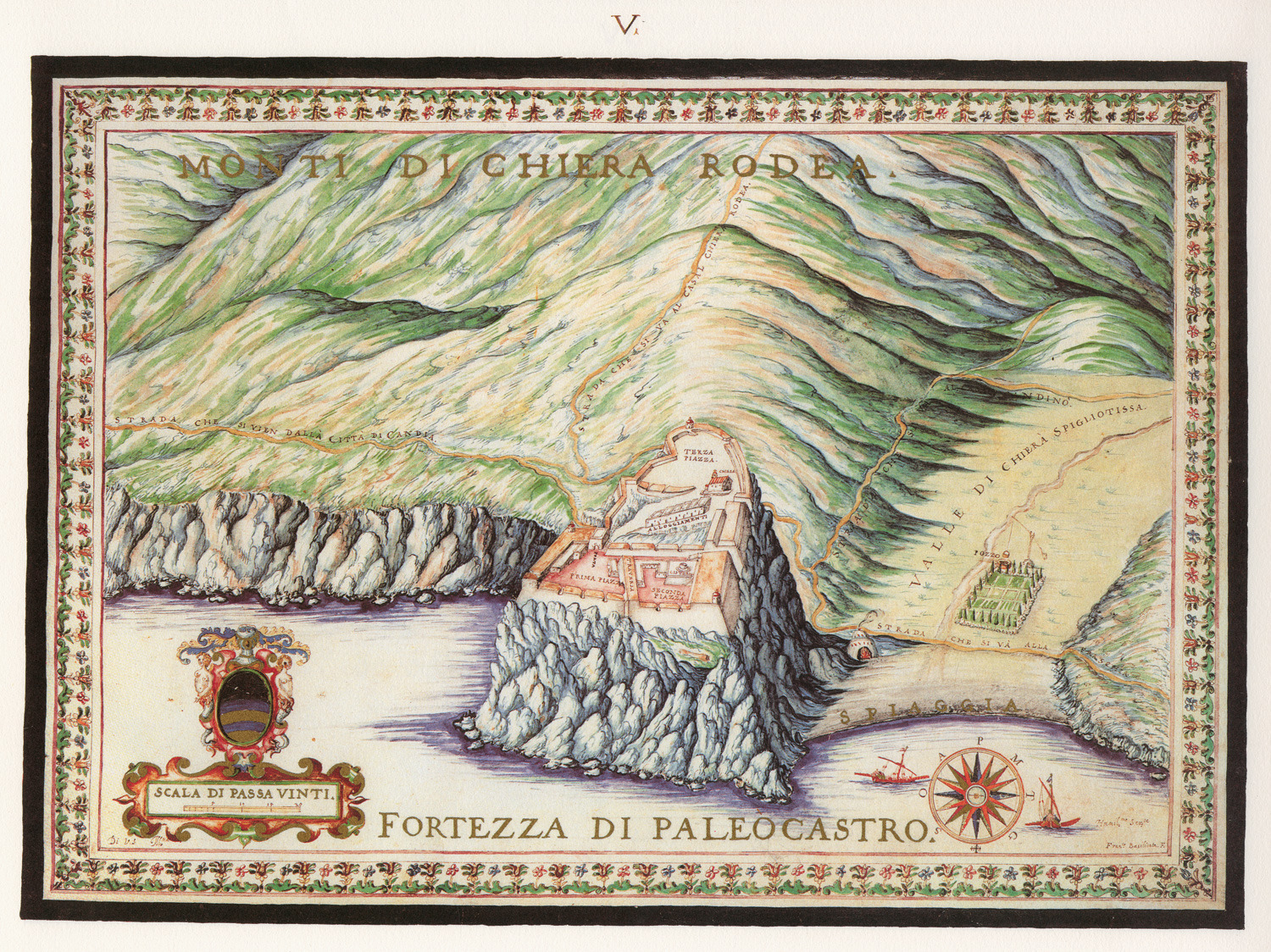
View of the castle and the surrounding area, Francesco Basilicata, 1618

The impressive and well preserved today arched entrance of the fort stood on the south side and is partially carved into the rock. As shown in the map of the report produced later by Francesco Basilicata to the Venetian authorities inside the fortress created three uneven squares of the "Up", the "Medium" and "Low Square" in order to ensure adequate space and flat area that would meet the needs of the defenders and stood barracks, garrison headquarters, church, Purpose, arms depots and water tanks. The walls of the fort still impressed with the diligence of the construction of massive walls and impeccable details. In the northeast corner there are the reliefs of the winged lion of St. Mark and the emblems of the era officials. In the report mentioned the Venetian Francesco Basilicata reveals the basic military operation of the fortress, "the shot of the gun reaches to the Salty, cape beach of the Bridge and also intersects with the shot of the rules of the city of Candia, although far. Fortress is capable, with moderate activity, to withstand any attack and to effectively protect ships that would carry help, because there is no good anchorage. "That passage is easy to appreciate the enormous importance of the Palaiokastro fortress and the key role it played during the 20 year siege of Candia to the Ottomans (1645-1669), which is recorded as the longest siege in world military history. Palaiokastro The beach is still preserved in excellent condition a lime of the same era, and is known from the design of Basilicata, the which is one of the best examples of such structures throughout the island. At the beginning of the Venetian Era, the castle lost its original importance because the Bay of Heraklion could be now protected by the Venetian ships. But when Venice was threatened by the presence of the Ottomans, the castle regained its value. Thus, during the years 1573-1595 they rebuilt the old castle, just like many other castles throughout the island. The castles of the Bay were then able to control the entire region, since the cannon shots from Palaiokastro crossed with the shots from the ramparts of St Andrew (Heraklion Walls).

The main gate was located on the south edge of the castle and lead to the lower square, which had many small rooms. In one of them you can still see a small church dedicated to Agios Markos (celebr. on Easter Tuesday), which was built with the ruins of the castle. North of the castle, there was an armory with solid and very strong walls. Right next to it was a water tank. Upon entering, there was a staircase leading to the second level, where the barracks were. Finally, the upper level hosted the church of the castle. On the northeast corner of the castle you could see the winged lion of St. Mark, the emblem of Venice. The fort was under Venetian occupation until the last years of the siege of Candia that finally “fell” in 1669. The Ottomans gave great importance to the occupation of the castle, so that they could land on the shores of Heraklion Bay safely. Thus, when the ships of Venice were still in Chania, the Turks surrounded the fort, which was surrendered. Then the Turks destroyed it in order to prevent the enemies from using it.

== Other points of interest ==
=== Kytaion ===
The English captain Spratt (1865) observing the morphological characteristic of the area (abdomen theater) where supported to place the Cretan city of the north coast of the island, the so-called Kytaion (Κύταιον; 'hull' or 'abdomen'), which is mentioned by Pliny, the Nonnus and Ptolemy, at this point. Suppose indeed that this rock Palaiokastro was the acropolis of the ancient city. However much earlier (1837) compatriot Pashley had also, and perhaps for the first time placed the Kytaion in this position, not because of the concave terrain, but because he was convinced that the name "Palaiocastro" always referred back to ancient cities. Placed even the city itself over the cliff. Before him the Venetians placed the unknown ancient city in various regions of the northern coast of Candia to Sitia. However, many archaeologists (Mariani, Faure, Plato) are persuaded by the arguments of both English Champion. He expressed the view that the ancient place name should be associated with the Mycenaean place name Kutato (from Hittite word kutta = wall). According to this interpretation, the Kytaion as "city teichioessa" shows worthy ancestor's historic Old Castle (Palaeokastro). The public works engineer Basilicata places to rock the ancient city of Elea "Elea citadel and traces on the rock that protrudes near the port Fraskia"

=== Venetian lime kiln ===
The Venetian lime kiln (Ενετική Ασβεστοκάμινος) of Palaiokastro is located on the settlement's namesake beach just below the western slope of the hill occupied by the impressive Venetian fortress. Is a rare monument of the era of Venetian rule in Crete that seems to be linked to the Venetian fortress with which coexisted for centuries.

The importance of lime kiln is that it is a rare example of crafts building at the Venetian era, which is known primarily from the fortification of architecture and religious architecture. Particularly important is the fact that the monument is shown, with the same format, in a 1618 map by Basilicata.

In previous years, the competent 13th Byzantine Antiquities carried full restoration and maintenance of the monument, which was released simultaneously from around arbitrary constructions. The monument is completely restored and is one of the numerous attraction of the area.

=== Panagia Spiliotisa ===
The Church of Panagia Spiliotissa (Εκκλησία της Παναγίας της Σπηλιώτισσας) is built in a cave inside the canyon of Palaiokastro. A spring stems directly beside the church.
