= Achlada, Crete =

Village in Crete, Greece

Achlada Αχλάδα
- Community
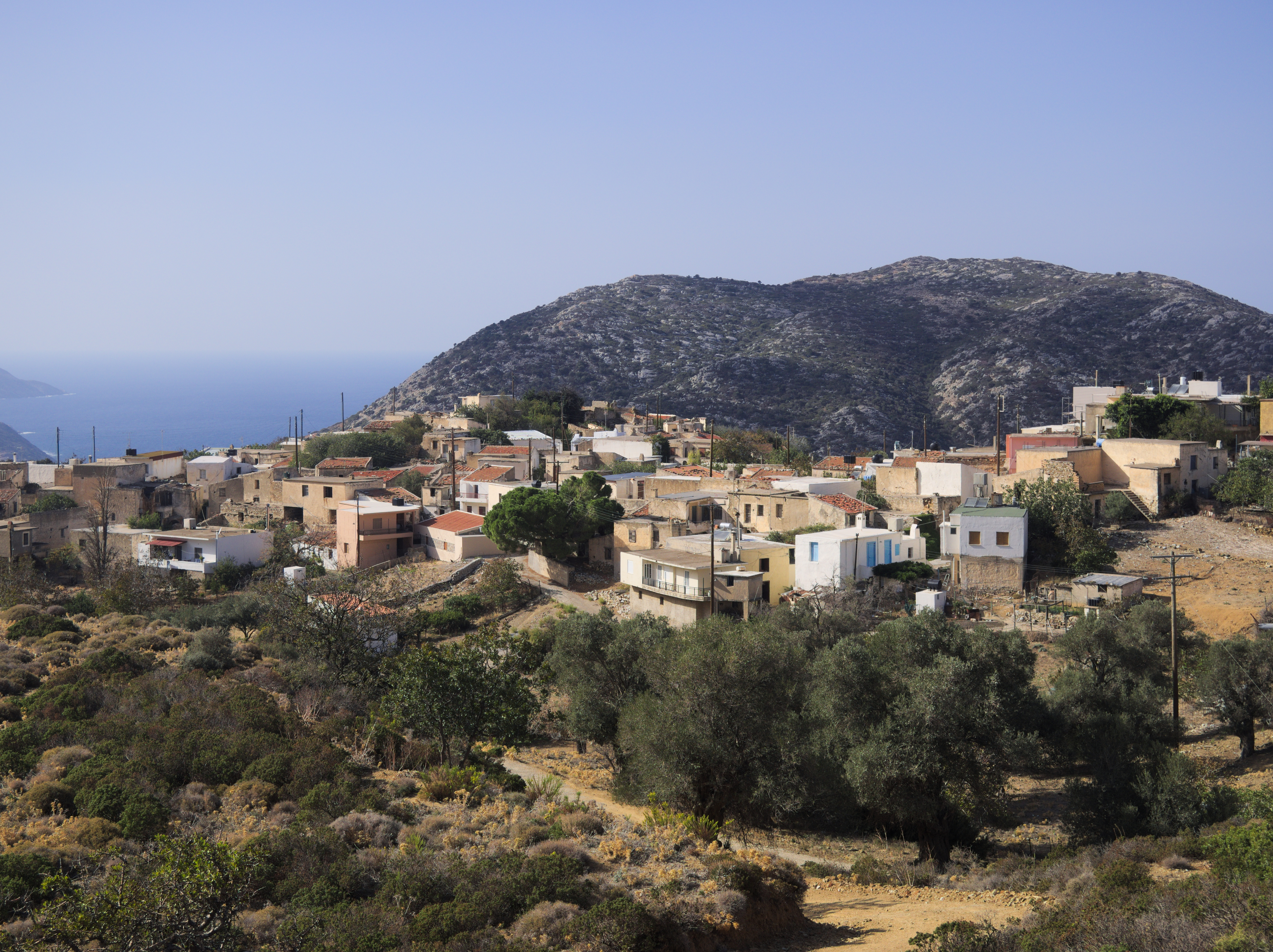

- Location within Greece
- Coordinates: 35°23′43″N 24°59′30″E
- Country: Greece
- Administrative region: Crete
- Regional unit: Heraklion
- Municipality: Malevizi
- Municipal unit: Gazi

Population (2021)
  - Community: 921
- Time zone: UTC+2 (EET)
  - Summer (DST): UTC+3 (EEST)

Achlada (Greek: Αχλάδα) is a village and a community in the Cretan municipality of Malevizi, and belongs to the municipal unit of Gazi, in Heraklion regional unit.

The inhabitants are shepherds and farmers who cultivate mostly fruits and vegetables in the surrounding hills and landscape, which are few kilometres from the sea shore. In the village is the church of Saint John the Prodrome and Saint Triphon with a wooden carved iconostasis. There is also the old elementary school that serves nowadays as a feast hall, and a newly built hotel on ecotourism that enhances rural cultural tourism. In recent years, local people, politicians and other interested parties have been discussing the restoration of parts of the village.

== Community of Achlada ==
The community of Achlada consists of the following seven settlements whose total population is 921 inhabitants, based on the 2021 census.

- Achlada – the district’s seat.
- Agia Pelagia
- Ammoudi
- Lygaria
- Mades
- Mononaftis
- Xirokampos

== History ==
The origin of the name is from the tree (αχλάδα ή αχράς – wild pear tree). In the Venetian archives the village is mentioned as Aclada with 63 inhabitants, at which time it belonged to the Mylopotamos region. Achlada used to belong, as a feudal estate, to the brothers Giorgios and Franciscos Mondinos having 35 houses and 2 churches (Gerola Monumenti veneti, III.).

== Sources ==
- Heraklion and its Prefecture, Heraklion Prefecture’s Edition (Το Ηράκλειο και ο Νομός του. Έκδοση Νομαρχίας Ηρακλείου).
- ΜΝΗΜΕΙΑ & ΙΣΤΟΡΙΚΕΣ ΑΝΑΦΟΡΕΣ ΣΤΟ ΔΗΜΟ ΓΑΖΙΟΥ (ΠΟΛΙΤΙΣΤΙΚΟΣ ΣΥΛΛΟΓΟΣ ΦΟΔΕΛΕ 2001).
- Το Μαλέβιζι, από τα προΐστορικά χρόνια μέχρι σήμερα. ΟΡΓΑΝΙΣΜΟΣ ΑΝΑΠΤΥΞΗΣ ΜΑΛΕΒΙΖΙΟΥ (ΟΡ.Α.ΜΑ) 1998.
