= Marathos, Crete =

Marathos Μάραθος
- Community
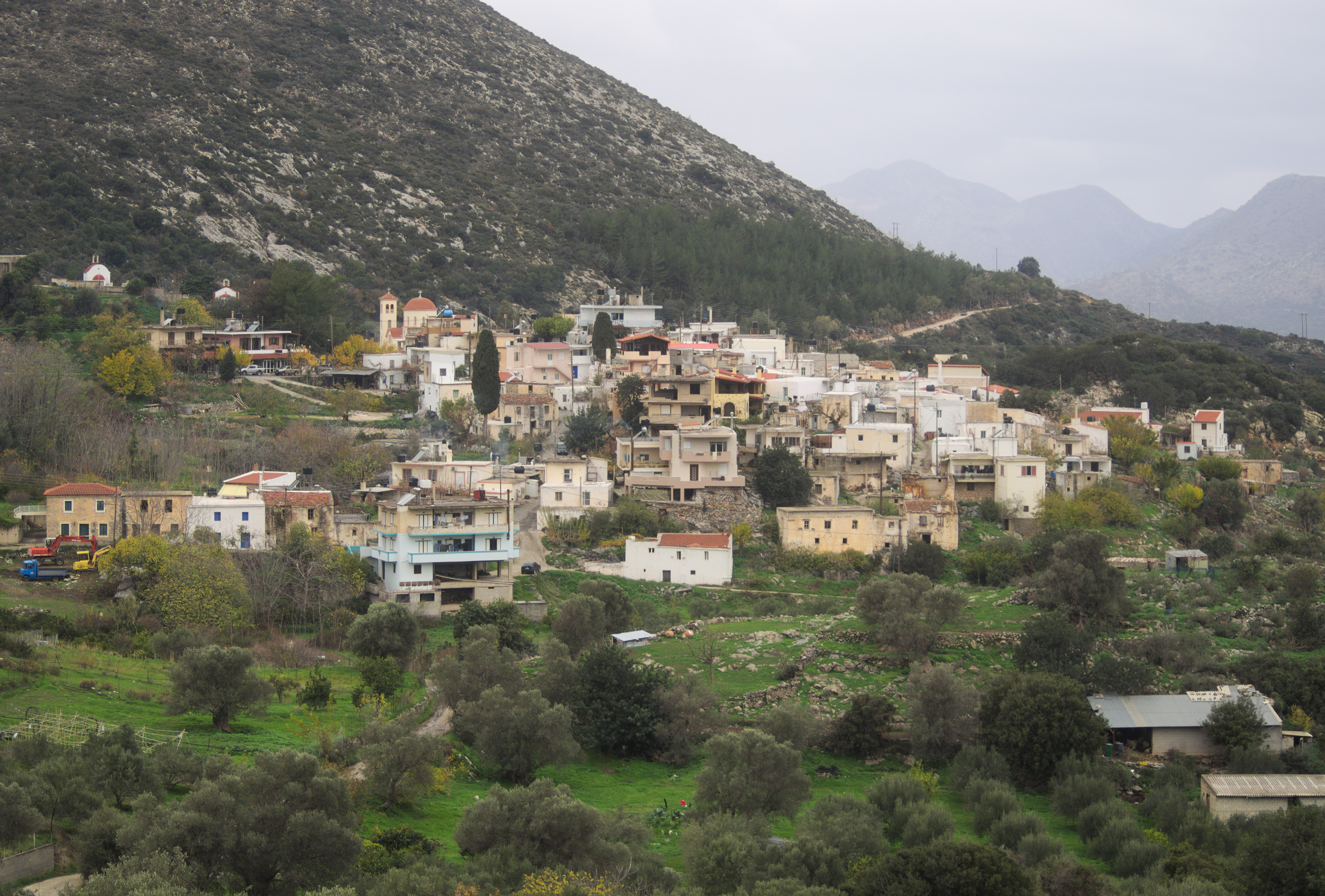

- Location within Greece
- Coordinates: 35°22′N 25°0′E
- Country: Greece
- Administrative region: Crete
- Regional unit: Heraklion
- Municipality: Malevizi
- Municipal unit: Tylisos
- City established: 1394
- Elevation: 400 m (1,300 ft)

Population (2021)
  - Community: 222
- Time zone: UTC+2 (EET)
  - Summer (DST): UTC+3 (EEST)
- Postal code: 71500

Marathos is a mountain village in the municipality of Malevizi, in the Crete region of Greece. It is about 20 kilometres west of Heraklion. The Marathianos River runs nearby and flows down to Fodele. The village relies mainly on agriculture, livestock and bee keeping.

On the main road there is a war monument commemorating the many battles on the island of Crete. It was built by the sculptor Yanni Klinakis.

The village has 5 tavernas and a traditional cafeteria.

== Doxa cavern ==
A short distance from the village is the historical cave of Doxa. At the entrance there is a map that shows the cave layout.

== Arkaliospilio cavern ==
At the foot of the mountain is Arkaliospilio cave. A large part of this cave is still unexplored.
