= Damasta, Heraklion =

Damasta Δαμάστα
- Community
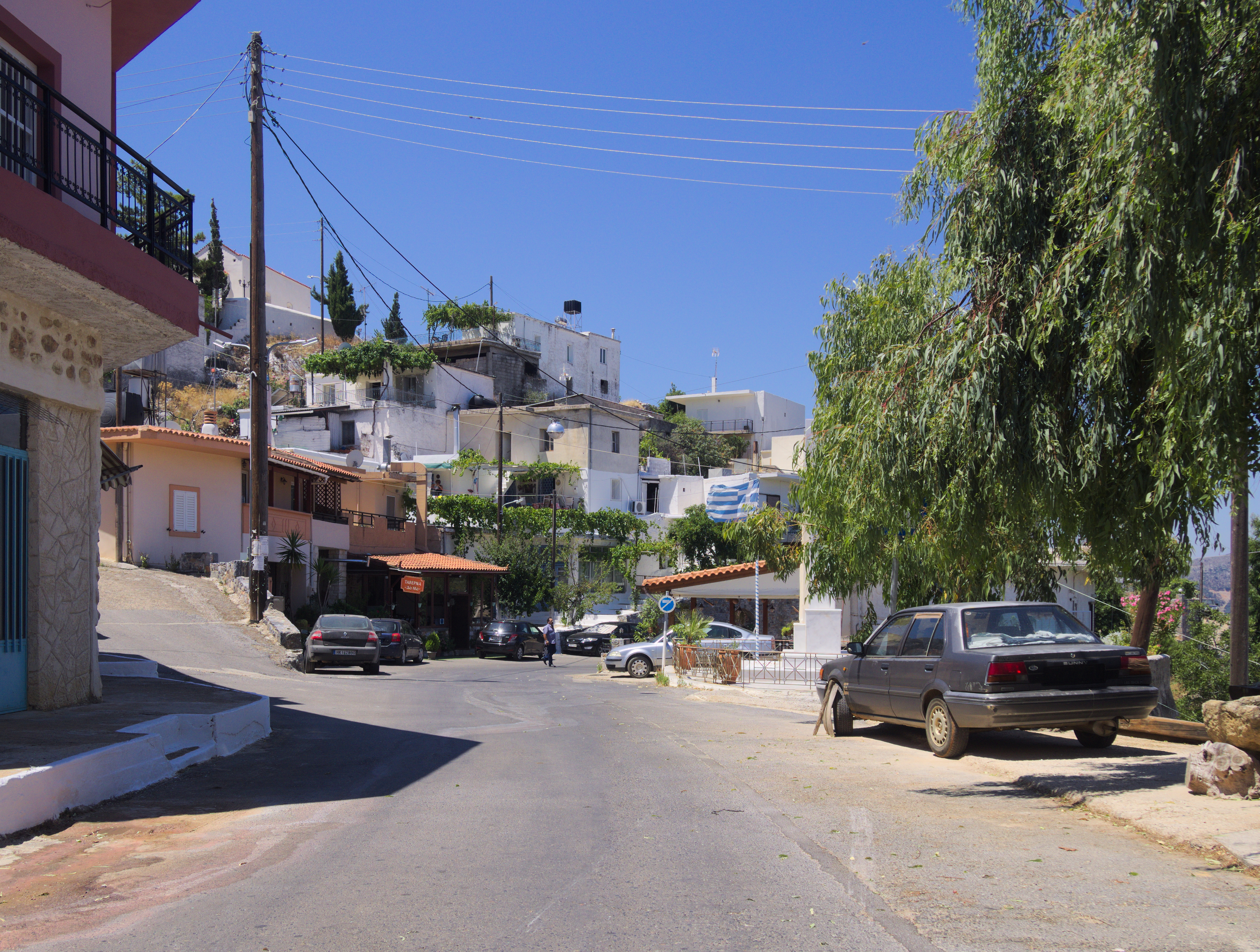
- View of the central road of Damasta

- Location within Greece
- Coordinates: 35°21′11″N 24°55′23″E
- Country: Greece
- Administrative region: Crete
- Regional unit: Heraklion
- Municipality: Malevizi
- Municipal unit: Tylisos

Population (2021)
  - Community: 115
- Time zone: UTC+2 (EET)
  - Summer (DST): UTC+3 (EEST)

Damasta (Greek: Δαμάστα) is a village in the municipality of Malevizi, in the Heraklion regional unit of Crete, Greece. According to the 2021 census, it numbers 115 inhabitants. The village is first attested in the 16th century. During World War II, it was the site of the Damasta sabotage on 8 August 1944, and the Germans executed 30 inhabitants as reprisals on 21 August.
