= Marathos =

Marathos may refer to:

- Amrit, an ancient Phoenician city
- Marathos Island, a Greek Island in the Aegean Sea
- Marathos, Crete, a village in the municipality of Malevizi, Crete, Greece
- Marathos, Evrytania, a village in the municipality of Agrafa, Evrytania, Greece
- Marathos, Karditsa, a village in the municipality of Argithea, Karditsa regional unit, Greece
