= Fraskia Bay =

Kingdom of Candia

Coordinates: 35.3880°N 25.0427°E

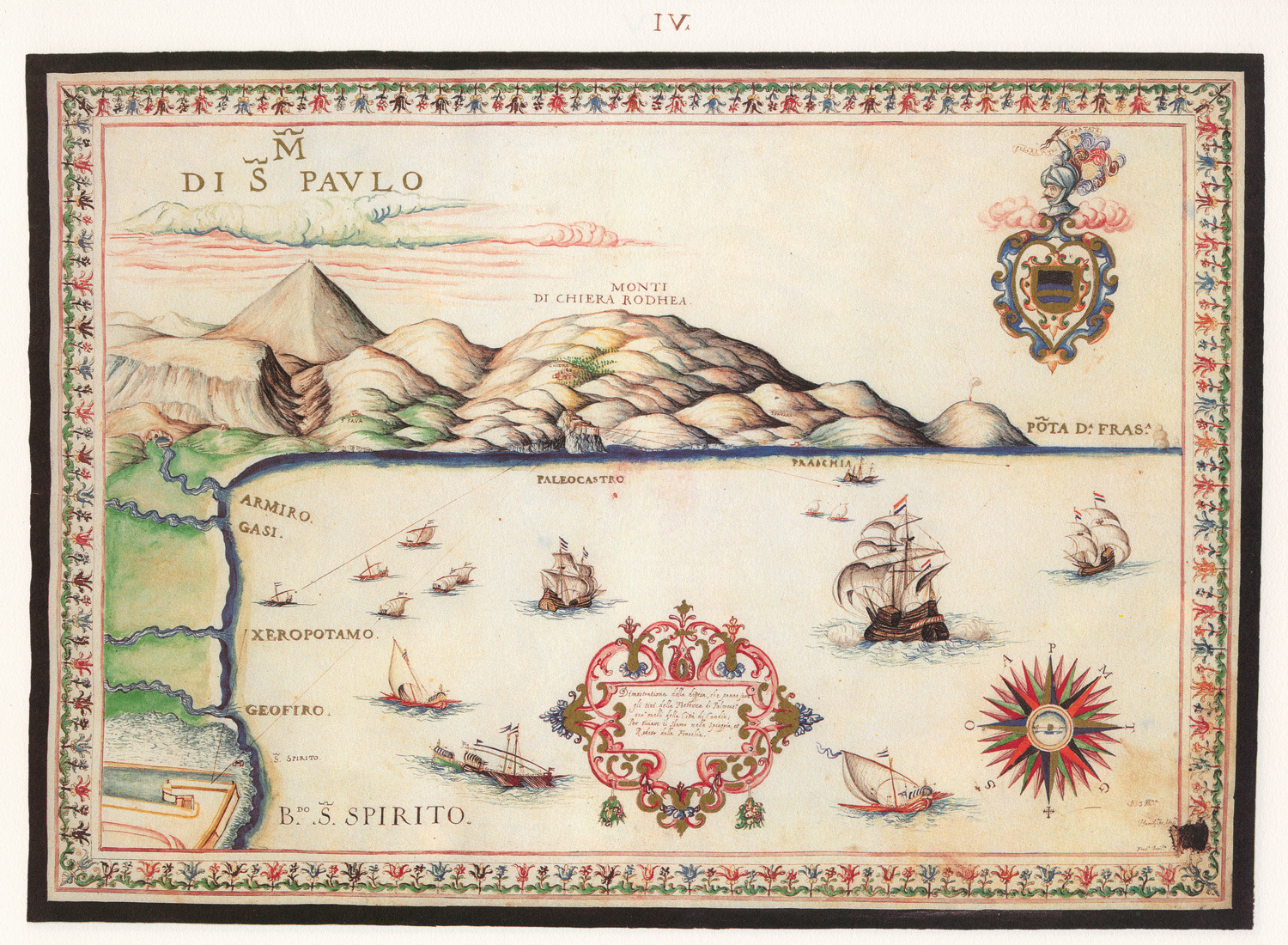
Map of Heraklion Bay with Fraskia in the center right, Francesco Basilicata, 1618.

Fraskia Bay, also transliterated as Fraschia (Greek: όρμος Φρασκιών, Φρασκιά), is a small bay on the north coast of Crete in Greece. It is located 10 km northwest of Heraklion near the villages of Rodia and Palaiokastro. Fraskia bay got its name from the word Fraski (Greek: Φρασκί), which is a type of baked clay beehive; the hills next to the shore are abundant in thyme and hence well-suited to apiculture. The fortress of Palaiokastro was built in the sixteenth century to protect both the bay of Fraskia and the bay of Heraklion from enemy ships.

Before the construction of the modern port of Heraklion in the 1920s, and especially during Venetian times, Fraskia bay was important for maritime trade. This was because its deep waters and natural protection against the prevailing northerly winds provided a safe anchorage. Furthermore, Fraskia bay functioned as an outport for the port of Heraklion as the shallow waters of the latter often forced vessels to take on only part of their cargo from Heraklion and the rest from Fraskia.

== See also ==
- Kingdom of Candia
- Rocca a Mare
- Dia
