= Agios Panteleimon Monastery =

Greek Orthodox monastery in Crete

- Μονή Αγίου Παντελεήμονος
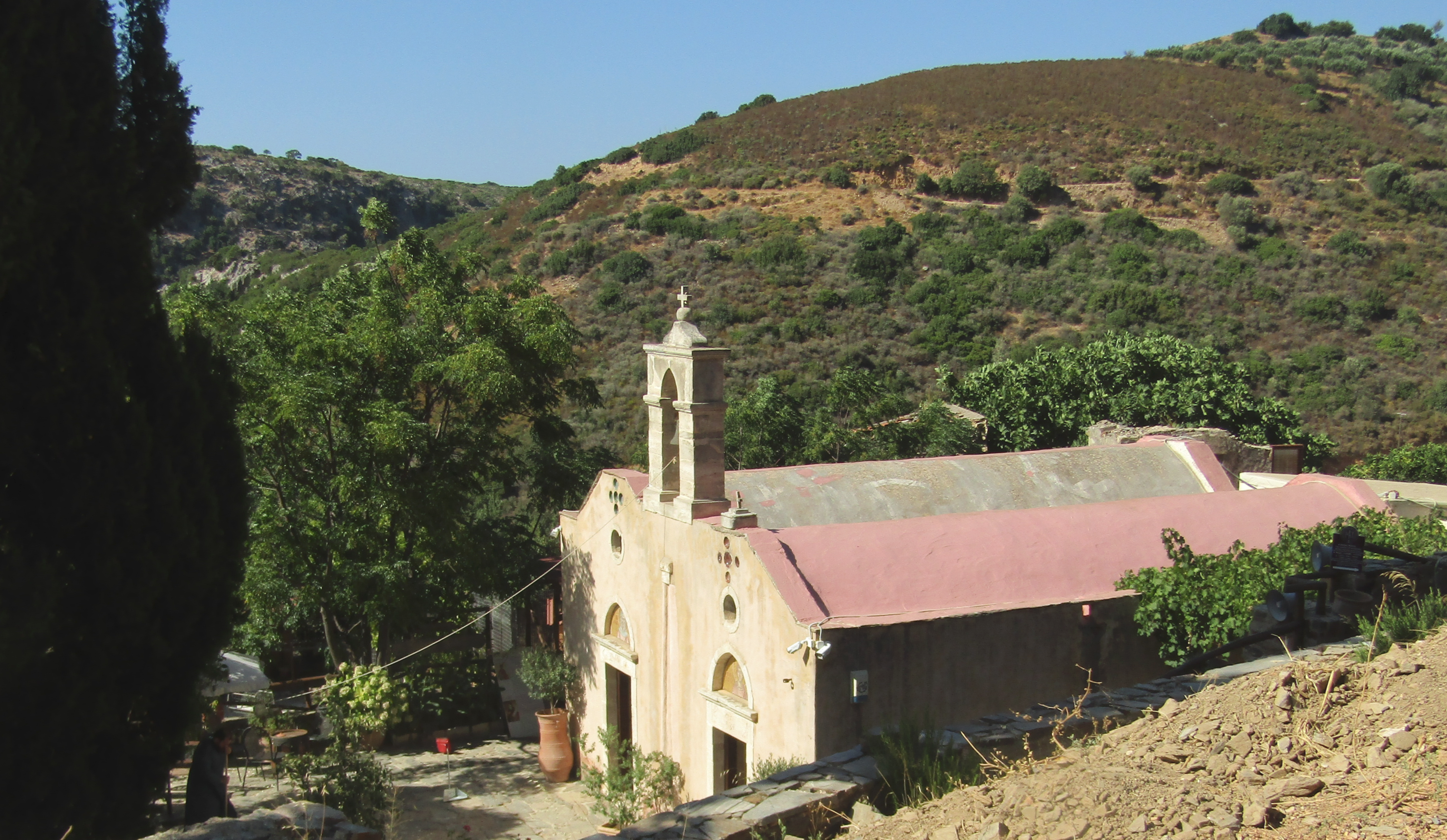

- Location of the monastery in Crete
- Interactive map of Agios Panteleimon Monastery

Monastery information
- Order: Ecumenical Patriarchate of Constantinople
- Denomination: Greek Orthodox
- Dedication: Saint Pantaleon
- Celebration: 27 July
- Archdiocese: Church of Crete

Architecture
- Status: Monastery
- Functional status: Active
- Completion date: 17th century

Site
- Location: Fodele, Malevizi, Crete
- Country: Greece
- Coordinates: 35°21′38″N 24°57′39″E

The Agios Panteleimon Monastery (Greek: Μονή Αγίου Παντελεήμονος), dedicated to Saint Pantaleon, is a Greek Orthodox monastery situated on the island of Crete, Greece.

== History ==
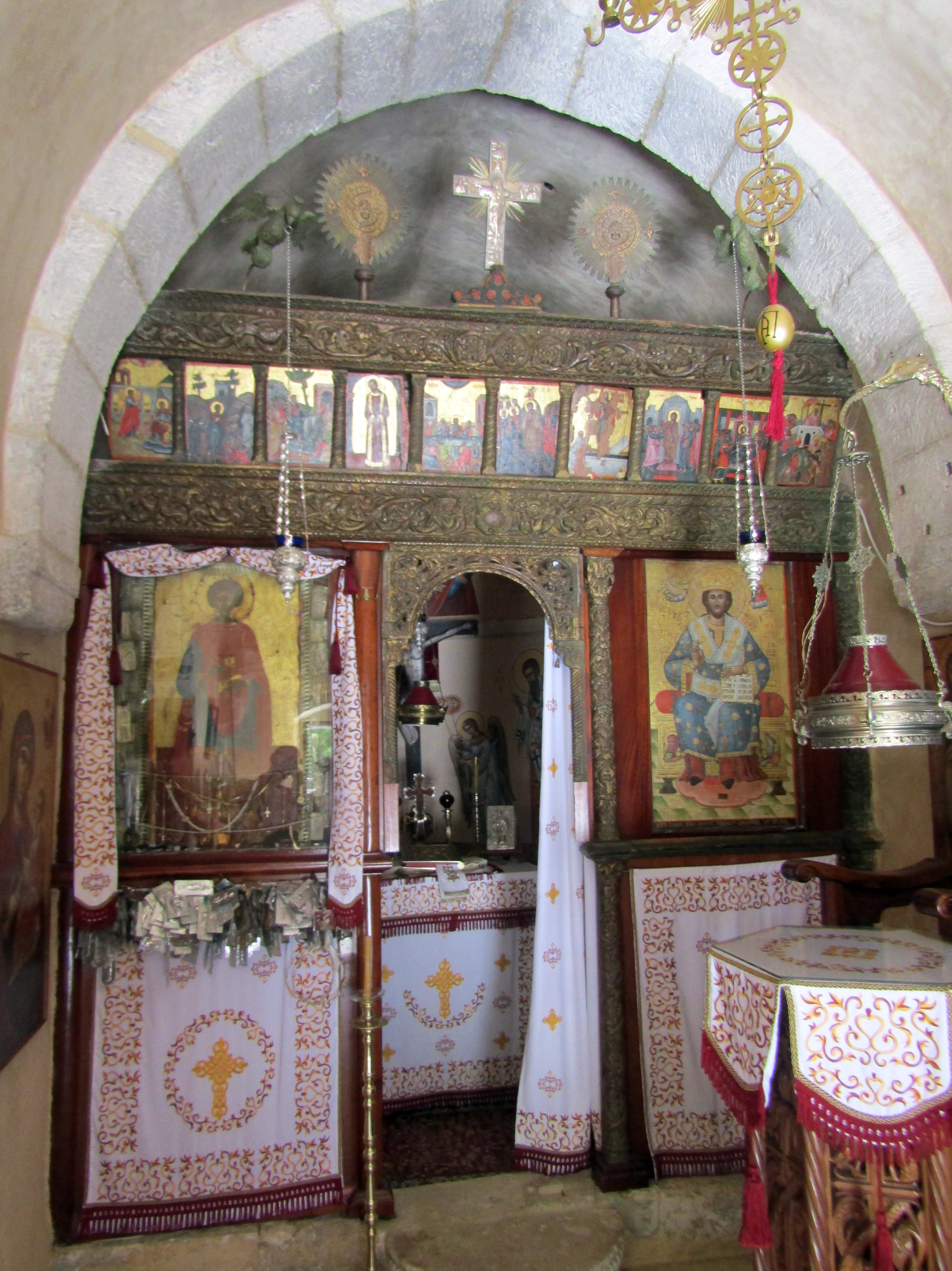
Church interior

The monastery was presumably founded in the 17th century by some monks fleeing from their original monastery located on the seashore near Sisses, which had been destroyed by pirates; nowadays the only remaining building is a chapel. Actually the small size and the relative remoteness of the town of Fodele were responsible for the preservation of the new monastery from the devastations occurring in other parts of Crete. But the monastery was subject to several damaging events and transformations over the centuries. Throughout the Ottoman occupation of the island it played an important role in supporting Cretan rebels, and during the 19th century was used as a field hospital. The few monks still living there celebrate the feast of Saint Pantaleon, the patron of bakers, every year, on 27 July.

== Description ==
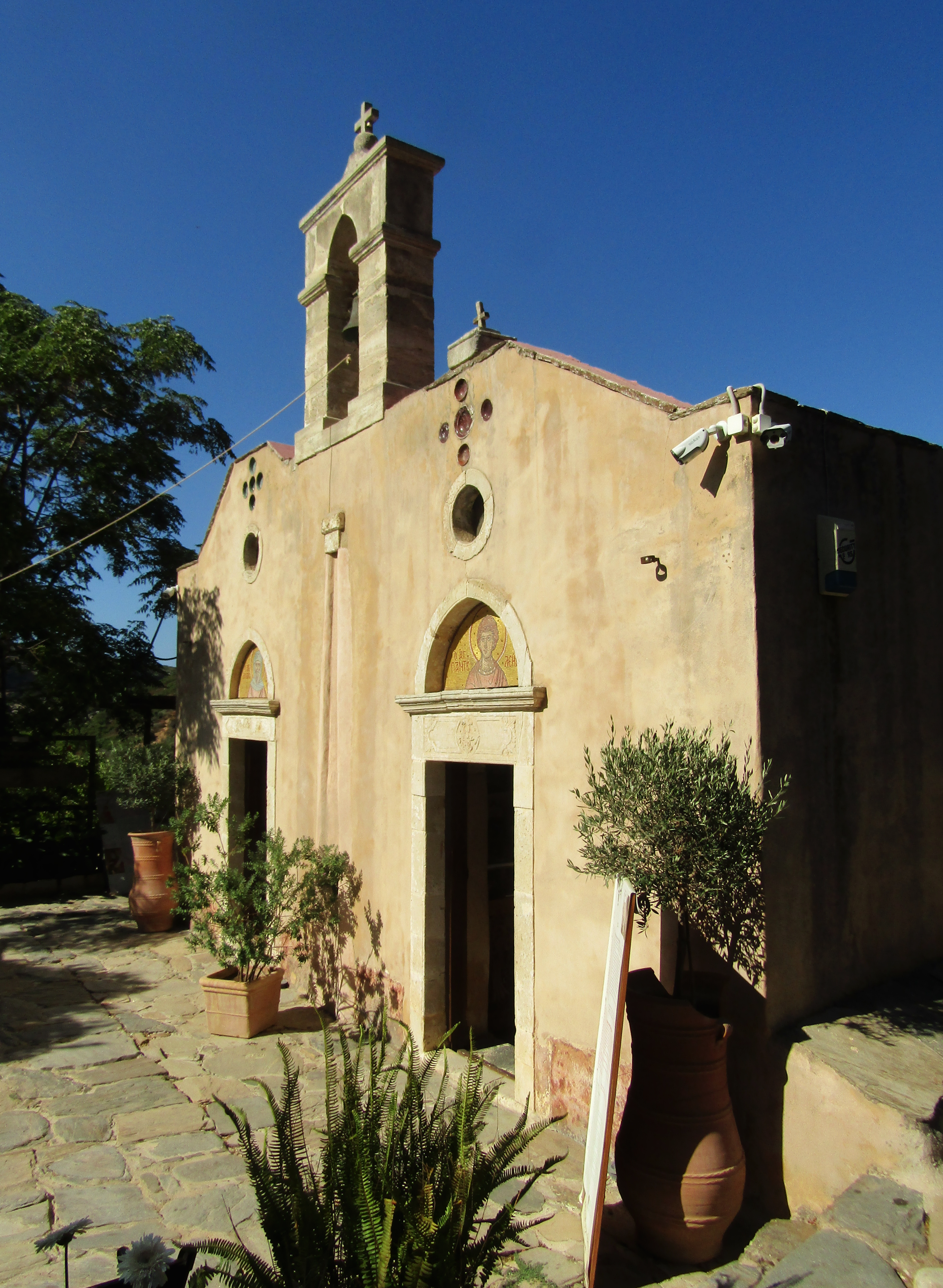
Church facade

The Agios Panteleimon is located west of Heraklion, some 5 kilometres (3.1 mi) from the center of Fodele, in the Malevizi municipality, outside of the main touristic routes. A tiny, asphalted road links it to Fodele along a shady valley with rich vegetation. The complex, along with several other Cretan monasteries, reflects a Venetian fortress plan, although very few of its buildings are in a good state nowadays. The church has two naves, one of which is dedicated to Saint Antony, the other to Saint Pantaleon. It possesses some noteworthy icons, although many of the other valuable icons that once belonged to the monastery are now exhibited in the Religious Art Museum of Heraklion.

== See also ==
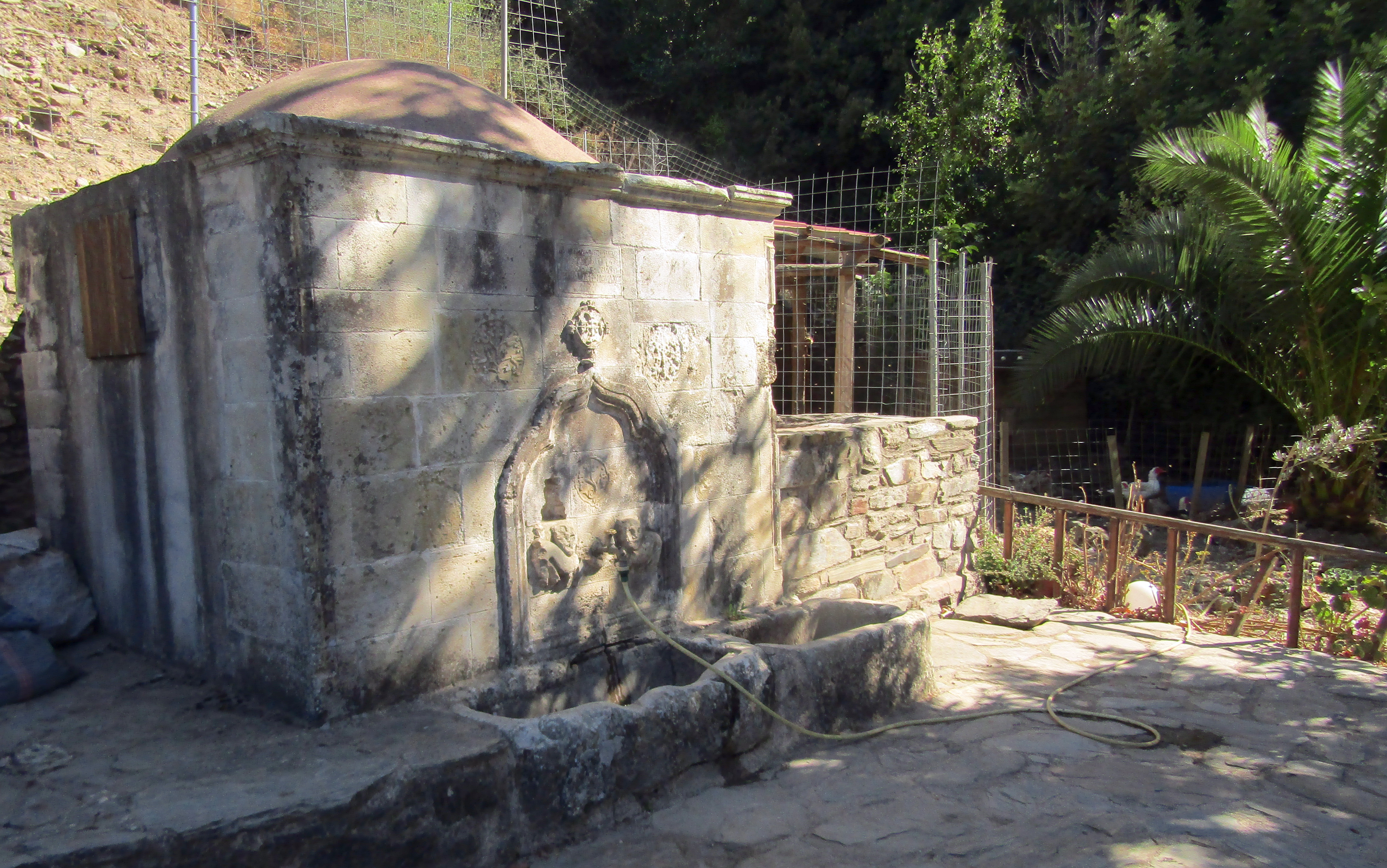
An old foutntain in the monastery compound

- Church of Crete
- List of Greek Orthodox monasteries in Greece
