= Damasta =

Damasta (Greek: Δαμάστα) can refer to the following places in Greece:

- Damasta, Heraklion, a village in Heraklion regional unit, Crete
  - Damasta sabotage, 1944
- Damasta, Phthiotis, a community in the Gorgopotamos municipal unit
