= Sklavokampos =

Minoan archaeological site in Crete, Greece

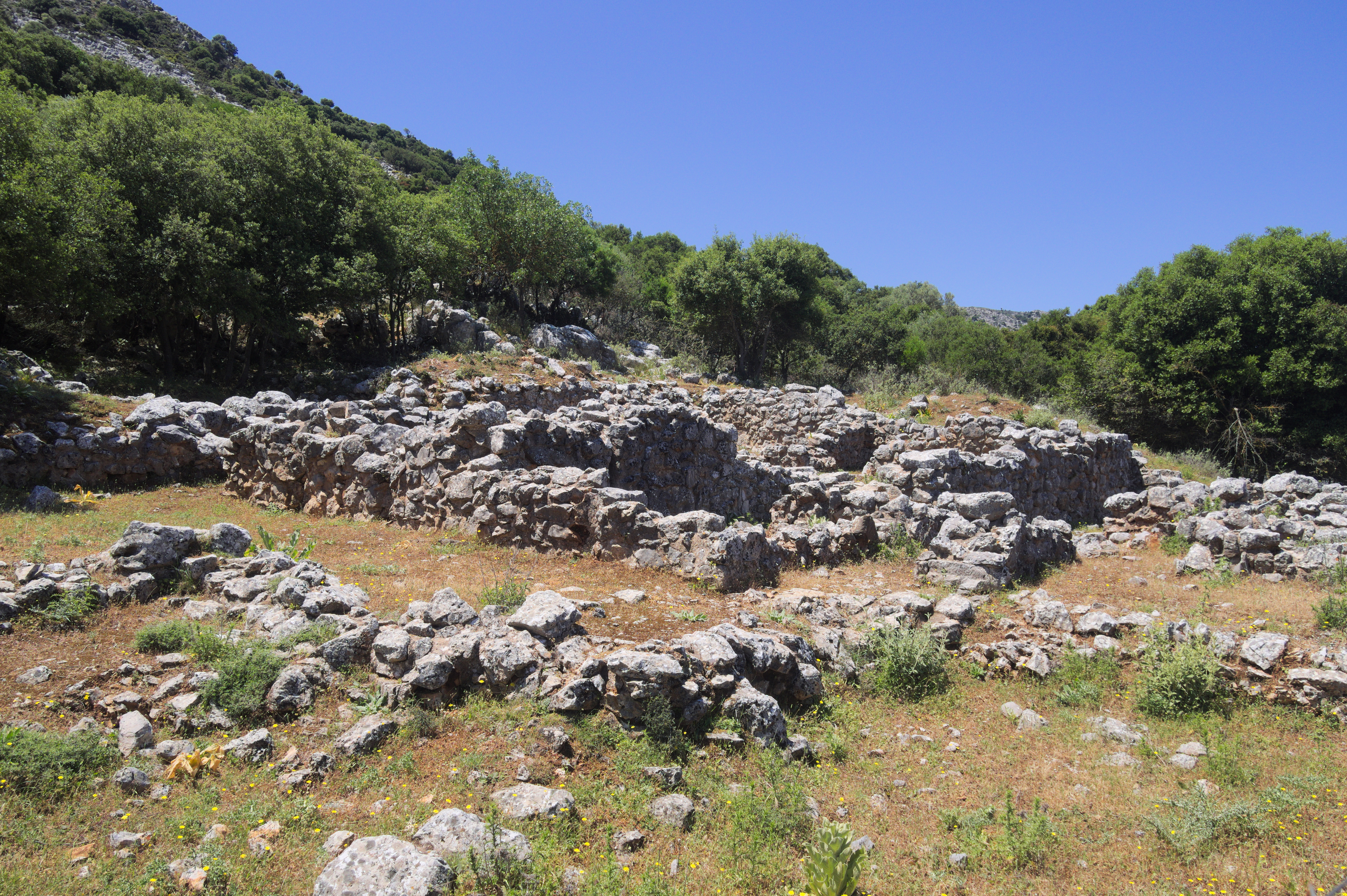
The ruins of the Minoan villa

Sklavokampos (also Sklavokambos) is the archaeological site of an ancient Minoan settlement in Crete, used during the Late Minoan period.

== Geography ==
Sklavokampos is southwest of Tylissos, at the road that connects in with Anogeia, 22 kilometres from Heraklion. It is a valley near Gonies gorge.

== Archaeology ==
The site was discovered while constructing a road to Anogeia and was first excavated in the 1930s.

A multiple-story building was found at the site. Its main room yielded a clay ox head, a LMIB style jug and a stone rhyton. The building had at least 17 rooms. Finds from an upper story included 39 sealings, a cylindrical vessel, a stone hammer and a clay foot. Seal impressions from one the Sklavokampos sealings have been found in Zakros, Gournia and Hagia Triada.

No frescoes or gypsum finishings, which are commonly found in Minoan palaces, were found at the Sklavokampos building.

== See also ==
- List of ancient Greek cities
