= Jacopo Dal Verme =

Italian condottiero

Coat of arms of Jacopo Dal Verme.

Jacopo Dal Verme (1350 - 12 February 1409) was an Italian condottiero.

== Biography ==
Born at Verona, he was the son of condottiero Luchino Dal Verme and Jacopa di Bonetto de' Malvesini. He began his military career in 1366, first under Alberico da Barbiano and then Cansignorio della Scala, lord of Verona, for whom in 1368 he fought against the Bonacolsi of Mantua. In 1370 he was hired by the Visconti of Milan to recover the Val Tidone. In 1378 Dal Verme was again fighting for the Scaligers of Verona, this time against Bernabò Visconti, but the following year he returned to Milan as counsellor for Gian Galeazzo Visconti, and as general commander in the campaign against John III of Montferrat. In 1385 he took part in the capture of Bernabò Visconti.

In 1387, taking advantage of the struggles between the Republic of Venice and the commune of Padua, Dal Verme obtained the latter's surrender. In 1391, again under the Visconti's aegis, he defeated the French invasion troops under Jean III of Armagnac at the Battle of Alessandria. In 1397, in the war between the Viscontis and the Gonzaga of Mantua, he occupied Borgoforte and Governolo, but was later defeated by Carlo Malatesta. Dal Verme was anyway instrumental in the signature of a peace between Francesco I Gonzaga and the Viscontis. The latter then turned to the conquest of Bologna, then ruled by Giovanni Bentivoglio. Dal Verme and the other commander Alberico da Barbiano won the battle of Casalecchio (26 June 1402), after which Bologna fell and Bentivoglio was killed. However, after Gian Galeazzo Visconti's death the following year, Dal Verme was forced to cede Bologna.

Dal Verme also served under Gian Galeazzo's successor, Giovanni Maria Visconti, in particular defeating the other condottiero Facino Cane in the battle of Binasco. However, in 1407 his relationships with Giovanni Maria fell and Dal Verme switched to the Republic of Venice. He died there in 1409. He was buried next to his father in the family mausoleum inside the church of Sant'Eufemia at Verona.

His son Luigi dal Verme was also a condottiero.

== Sources ==
- Crollalanza, Goffredo (1886). Dizionario storico blasonico. Pisa.
- Litta, Pompeo (1834). Famiglie celebri italiane. Dal Verme di Verona. Milan.
