= Luchino Dal Verme =

Italian condottiero

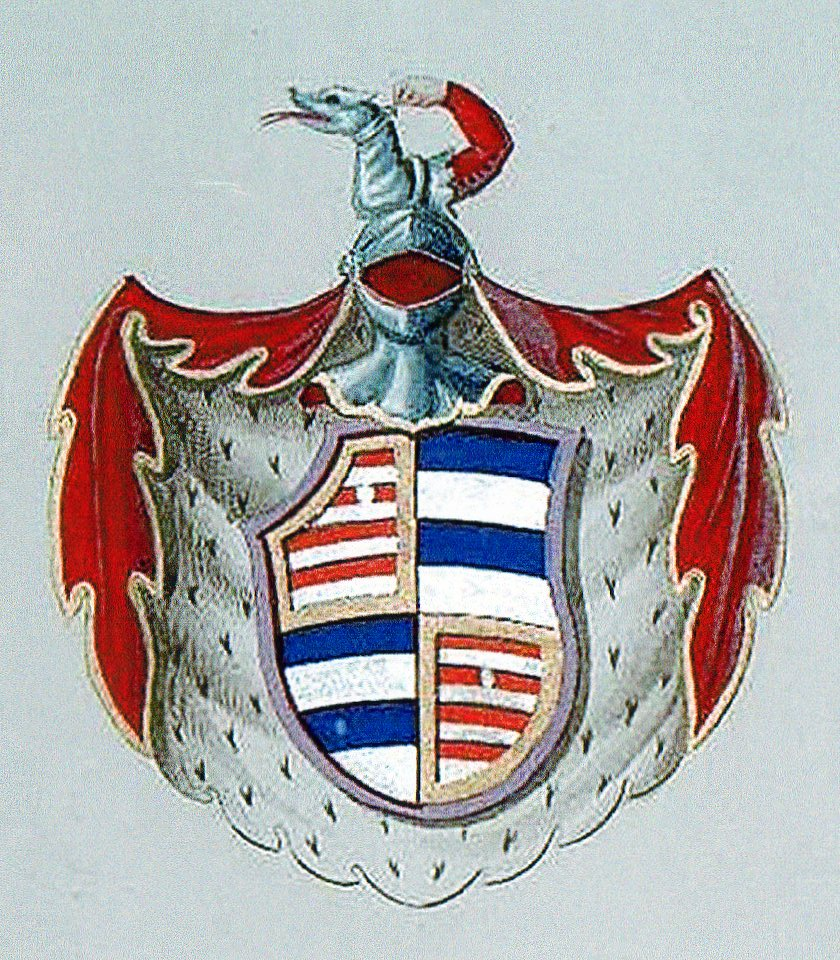
Coat of arms of the Dal Verme family.

Luchino Dal Verme (c. 1320 – early 1367) was an Italian condottiero.

== Biography ==
He was a member of a noble family of Verona, and his father was a supporter of Cangrande I della Scala. In 1341 he defended Lucca first for Mastino I della Scala, then for the Republic of Florence. His friendship with poet Francesco Petrarca is documented for the first time in 1350, when he was likely at the service of the Visconti of Milan. In 1352 he fought in Tuscany for the Visconti.

In 1354 he had to flee from Verona due to his support to Fregnano della Scala's failed coup against Cangrande II della Scala. The same year he defended Bologna for Giovanni Visconti, and, the following year, he was governor in Genoa. After the split of the Visconti lands between Bernabò and Galeazzo II Visconti, Dal Verme sided for the former. In 1359 he commanded the siege of the rebel city of Pavia. Two years later, he sided for Galeazzo, who named him as captain-general of Piedmont, where Dal Verme fought against the Marquisate of Montferrat and the English troops that were routing the area at the time.

After advice from Petrarca, in 1364 he accepted from the Republic of Venice the task of suppressing the Revolt of Saint Titus, a rebellion that had broken out in Crete. On May 7, Dal Verme landed in the island with 800 horse and 2,000 infantry. His success there granted Dal Verme the title of Venetian noble. After this period, there are little sources about Dal Verme's life: for sure it is known, in particular from Petrarca's letters, that he was in the Holy Land. This may imply that he took part in the anti-Turkish expedition of Amadeus VI, Count of Savoy. His exact date of death is unknown, however he likely died early in 1367 in or near Constantinople.

His son Jacopo Dal Verme was also a condottiero.

== Sources ==
- Litta, Pompeo (1834). Famiglie celebri italiane. Dal Verme di Verona. Milan.
- Mallett, Michael E. (1986). "Luchino Dal Verme". Dizionario Biografico degli Italiani (in Italian). Vol. 32: Dall'Anconata–Da Ronco. Rome: Istituto dell'Enciclopedia Italiana. ISBN 978-88-12-00032-6.
