= Gazi, Crete =

Suburb of Heraklion, Greece

Gazi Γάζι
- Municipal unit
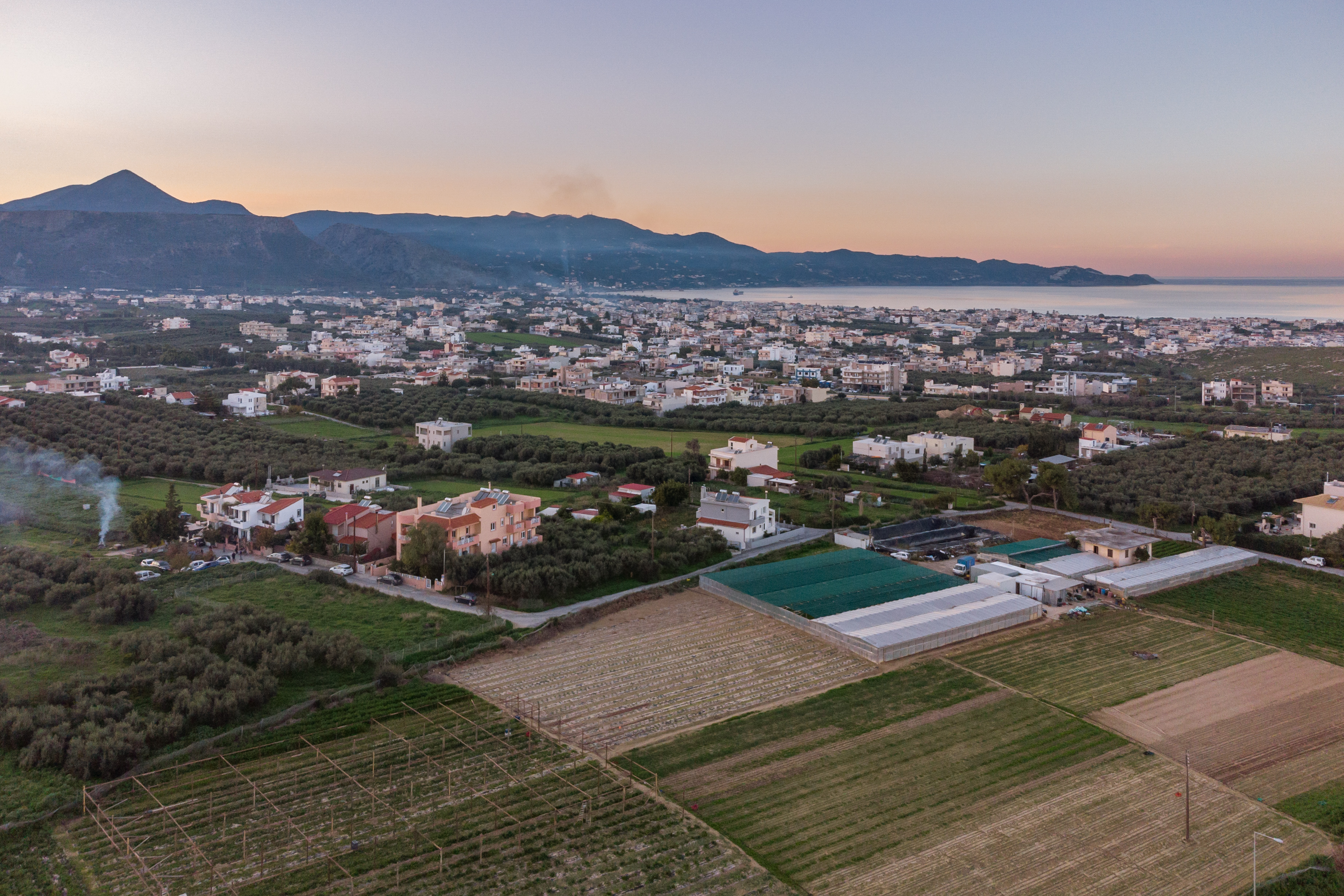

- Location within the regional unit

- Location within Greece
- Coordinates: 35°19.5′N 25°04′E
- Country: Greece
- Administrative region: Crete
- Regional unit: Heraklion
- Municipality: Malevizi

Area
  - Municipal unit: 95.8 km^{2} (37.0 sq mi)
- Elevation: 32 m (105 ft)

Population (2021)
  - Municipal unit: 20,918
  - Municipal unit density: 218/km^{2} (566/sq mi)
  - Community: 16,256
- Time zone: UTC+2 (EET)
  - Summer (DST): UTC+3 (EEST)

Gazi (Greek: Γάζι, romanized: Gazi) is a western suburb of Heraklion and a former municipality in the Heraklion regional unit of Crete in Greece.

== History ==
Since the 2011 local government reform, it has been part of the municipality Malevizi, of which it is a municipal unit. The municipal unit comprises several nearby villages with a total area of 95.81 square kilometres (36.99 sq mi) and a total population of 20,918, of whom 16,256 live within Gazi (2021 census). It lies 6 kilometres (4 miles) west of Heraklion, on the north coast of Crete.

Villages of Gazi municipal unit, by community:

- Gazi (17.7 km²): Gazi, Agia Marina, Agios Dimitrios, Agios Panteleimon, Ammoudara, Council-Houses, Kavrochori, Kefalogiannis, Koluvas, 62 Martyres, Xiropotamos, Kalessa.
- Rodia (21.6 km²): Rodia, Kapetanaki Metochi, Linoperamata, Pantanassa, Palaiokastro, Savatiana Monastery.
- Fodele (24.4 km²): Fodele, Agios Panteleimon Monastery, Fodele beach.

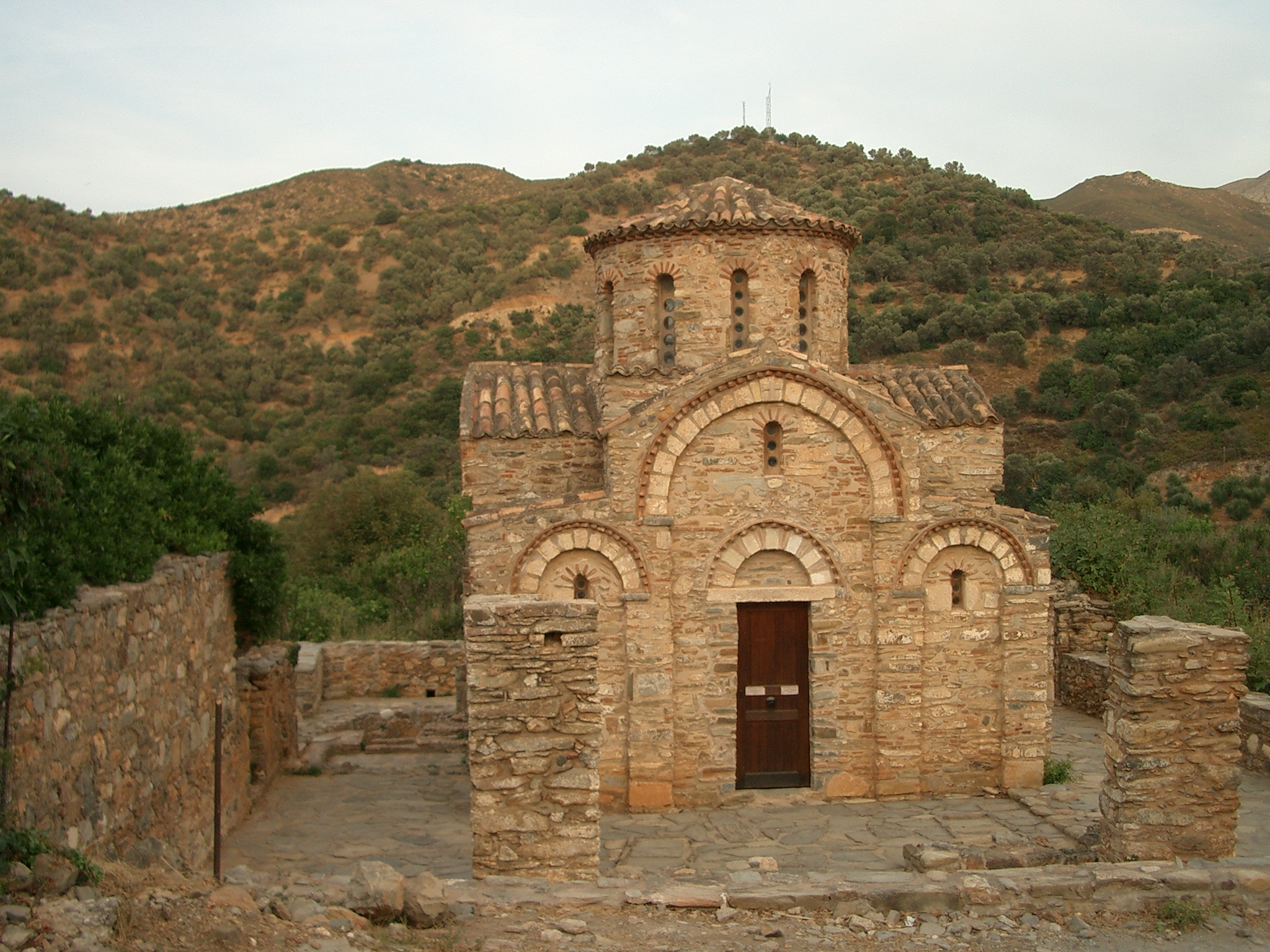
11th century chapel in Fodele

- Achlada (21.6 km²): Achlada, Agia Pelagia, Lygaria, Made.
- Kalesia (10.5 km²): Ano Kalesia and Kato Kalesia

Fodele is claimed as the birthplace of the painter El Greco, but this is disputed. His family were from the area and there is a Museum of El Greco in the village.

The ruins of a Genoese castle are at Palaiokastro ("Old Castle").

Agia Pelagia is a seaside resort village.
