= 2022 Greek floods =

Natural disaster in Crete, Greece

- Date: October 2022
- Location: Greece
- Type: flooding
- Deaths: 2
- Injuries: unknown

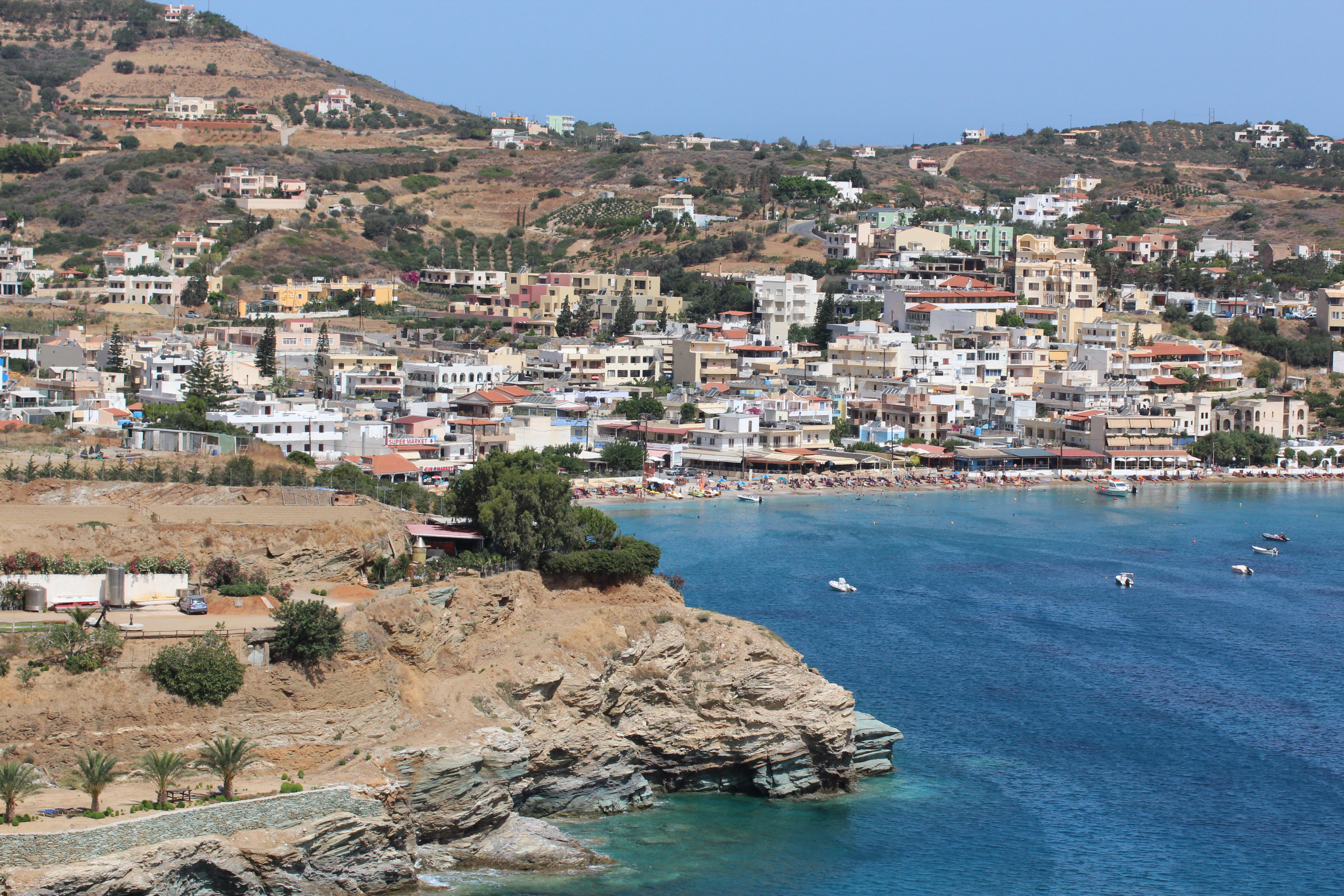
The seaside resort of Agia Pelagia was most heavily affected.

In October 2022, Crete, the largest island of Greece was hit by destructive floods. The floods were triggered by a large thunderstorm and heavy rains. Two fatalities were reported along with 150 millimetres (5.9 in) of rain falling within less 12 hours.

== Response ==
On 15 October, flash floods hit the north coast of Crete. Extensive damage was reported in many seaside areas. Settlements affected included Agia Pelagia, Lygaria, Chania and Lasithi.

On 16 October, a government taskforce arrived on scene.
