= Krousonas =

Krousonas Κρουσώνας
- Municipal unit
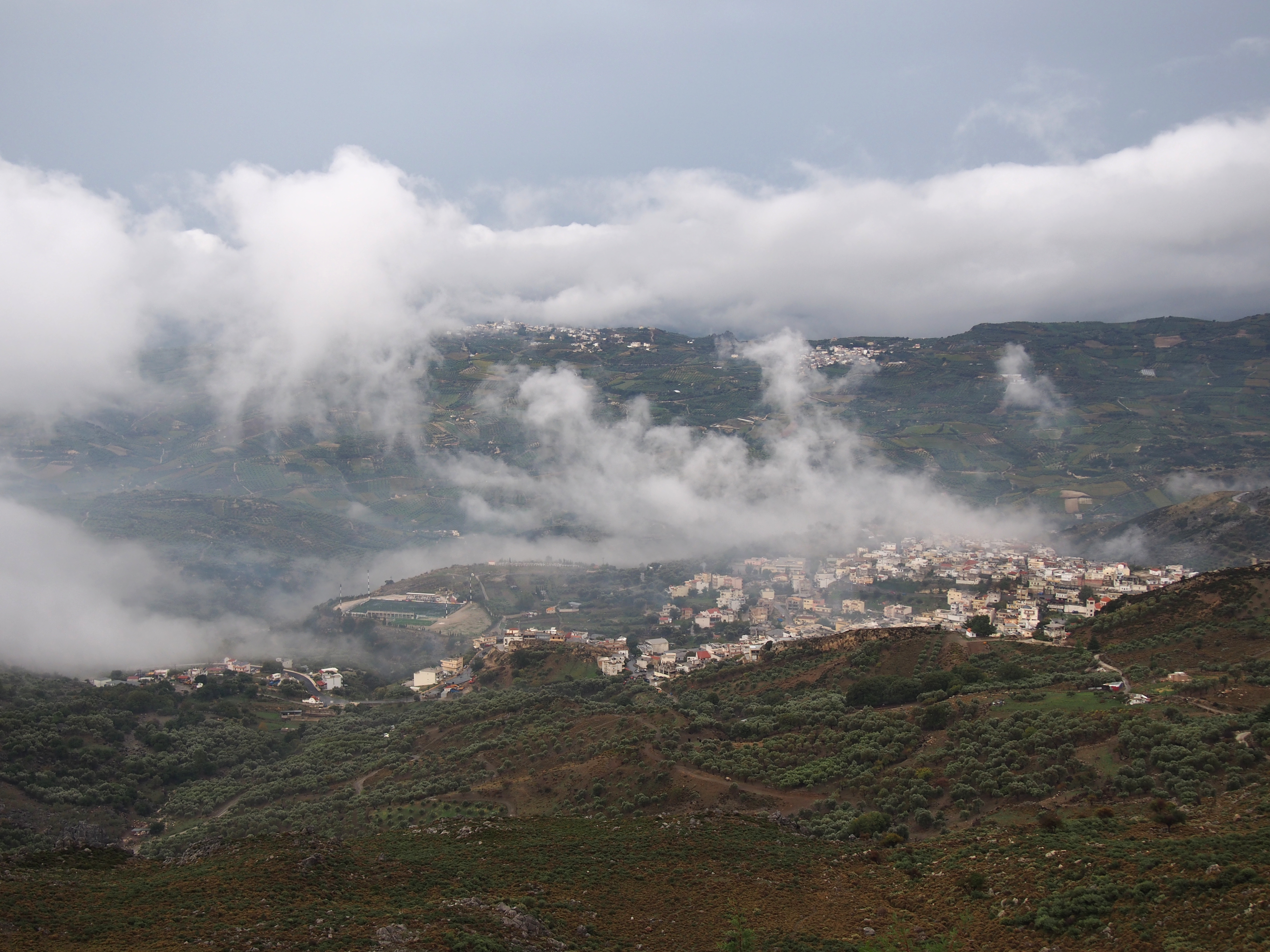
- Krousonas in fog, view from west

- Location within the regional unit

- Location within Greece
- Coordinates: 35°14′N 24°59′E
- Country: Greece
- Administrative region: Crete
- Regional unit: Heraklion
- Municipality: Malevizi

Area
  - Municipal unit: 65.0 km^{2} (25.1 sq mi)
- Elevation: 455 m (1,493 ft)

Population (2021)
  - Municipal unit: 2,564
  - Municipal unit density: 39.4/km^{2} (102/sq mi)
  - Community: 2,094
- Time zone: UTC+2 (EET)
  - Summer (DST): UTC+3 (EEST)

Krousonas (Greek: Κρουσώνας) is a village and a former municipality in the Heraklion regional unit, Crete, Greece. Since the 2011 local government reform it is part of the municipality Malevizi, of which it is a municipal unit. The municipal unit has an area of 65.033 km^{2} (25.109 sq mi). Population 2,564 (2021).
