= Rodia, Heraklion =

Village in Malevizi Municipality, Greece

Rodia Ροδιά
- Community
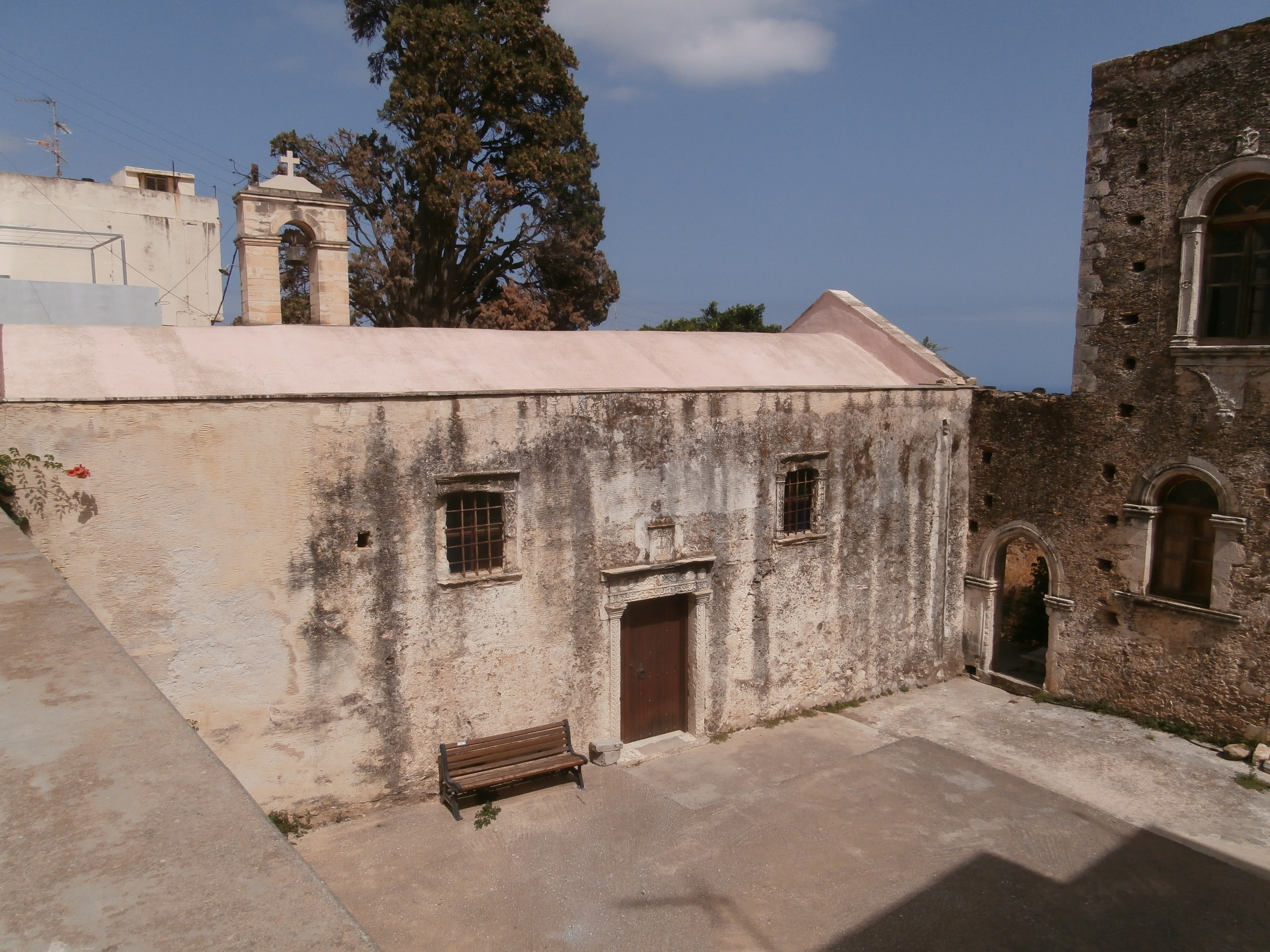
- The church of Annunciation

- Location within Greece
- Coordinates: 35°21′55″N 25°01′14″E
- Country: Greece
- Administrative region: Crete
- Regional unit: Heraklion
- Municipality: Malevizi
- Municipal unit: Gazi

Area
  - Community: 21.6 km^{2} (8.3 sq mi)

Population (2021)
  - Community: 1,832
  - Density: 84.8/km^{2} (220/sq mi)
- Time zone: UTC+2 (EET)
  - Summer (DST): UTC+3 (EEST)

Rodia (Greek: Ροδιά, before 1940: Ρογδιά - Rogdia) is a village and community in the Gazi municipal unit, Heraklion regional unit, on the island of Crete, Greece.

The community of Rodia covers 21.6 km^{2} and includes the following villages and areas: Rodia, Kapetanaki Metochi, Linoperamata, Pantanassa, Palaiokastro, and Savatiana Monastery.
