= Tylissos =

Tylissos Τύλισος
- Municipal unit
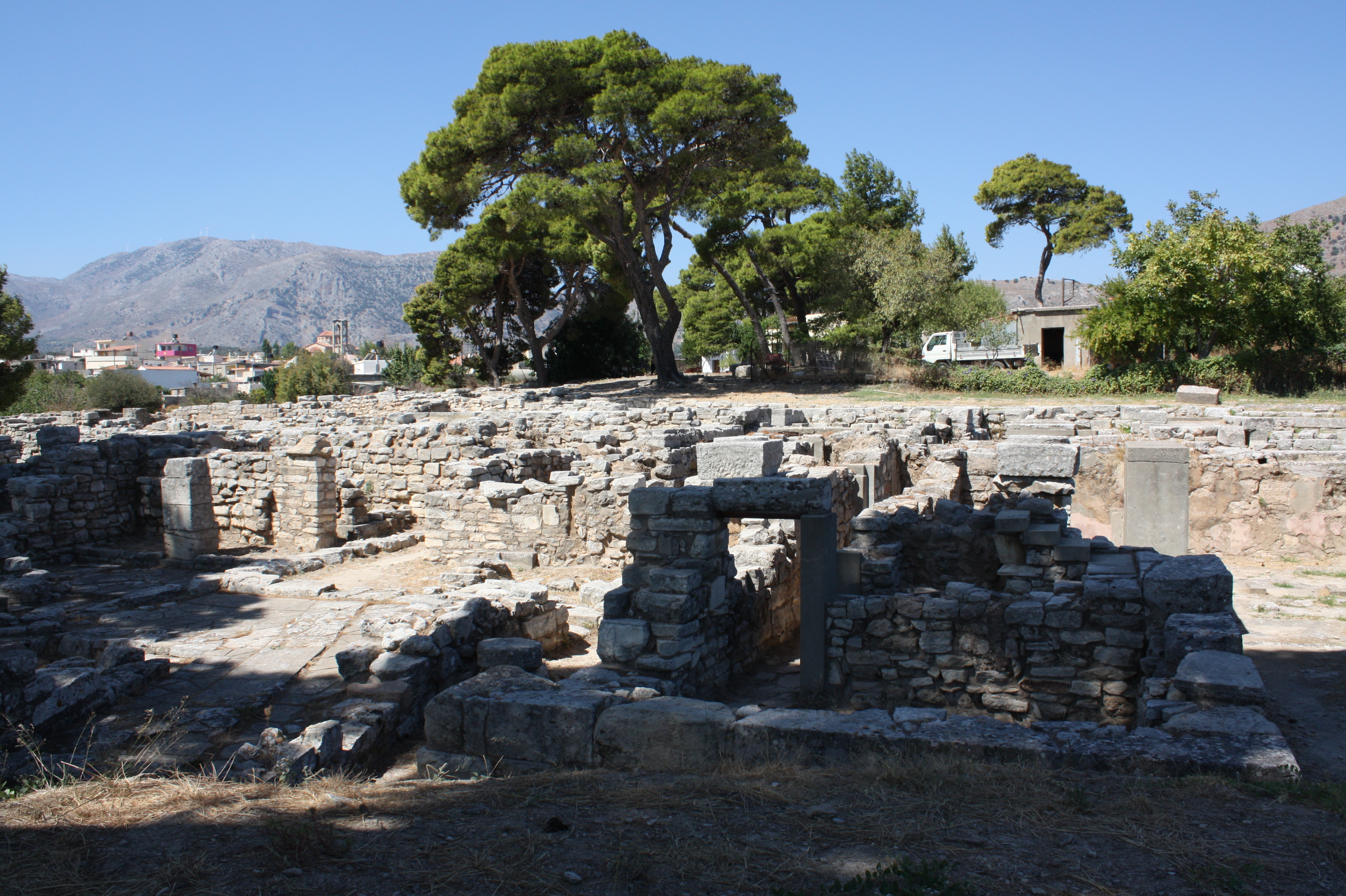
- Ancient Tylisos

- Location within the regional unit

- Location within Greece
- Coordinates: 35°19′N 24°58′E
- Country: Greece
- Administrative region: Crete
- Regional unit: Heraklion
- Municipality: Malevizi

Area
  - Municipal unit: 131.1 km^{2} (50.6 sq mi)
- Elevation: 200 m (660 ft)

Population (2021)
  - Municipal unit: 2,252
  - Municipal unit density: 17.18/km^{2} (44.49/sq mi)
  - Community: 944
- Time zone: UTC+2 (EET)
  - Summer (DST): UTC+3 (EEST)

Tylissos (also Pyrgos-Tylissos or Tylisos; Greek: Τύλισος) is a town and a former municipality in the Heraklion regional unit, Crete, Greece. Since the 2011 local government reform it is part of the municipality Malevizi, of which it is a municipal unit. The municipal unit has an area of 131.064 km^{2} (50.604 sq mi). Population 2,252 in 2021. It is the site of an ancient city of the same name, which dates back to the Minoan era. The Municipality of Tylisos was created in 1999 and includes 11 villages. The economy is based on agriculture, mainly grape cultivation (accounting for 4.8% of the island’s production) and olive cultivation. At the same time stock farming of sheep, goats and chickens and beehive farms are abundant.

== Archaeology ==
Tylissos was excavated 1909–1913 by Joseph Hadzidakis, 1953–1955 by Nicholas Platon and in 1971 by A. Kanta. The town was in use Early Minoan II to Late Minoan IIIA, and the nearby peak sanctuary, excavated in 1963 by Alexiou, was in use until at least Late Minoan IA. Structures include houses, a cistern and an aqueduct with clay pipes. Excavation finds have included a pithos with Linear A inscriptions, stone horns, and clay human and animal figurines.

There are also a significant number of caves nearby including the Kamilari Cave, Hainospilios Cave, Trapeza Cave, Doxa and Arkaliospilio. There are also two gorges which are namely: the Almiros gorge, the Gonies gorge. Agrotourism is also a very popular among visitors all year round. Arolithos village, Ktima Kares and Agrotikon are the most visited sites for this and other leisure activities.

Also nearby is Sklavokampos.

== Sources ==
- Jones, Donald W. 1999 Peak Sanctuaries and Sacred Caves of Minoan Crete ISBN 91-7081-153-9
- Kyriakidis, Evangelos, 2005, Ritual in the Aegean: The Minoan Peak Sanctuaries, London: Duckworth publishers
- Kyriakidis, Evangelos 2007, ‘Finding Ritual: Calibrating the Evidence’, in Kyriakidis, E. (ed.), 2007. The Archaeology of Ritual, Los Angeles: Cotsen Institute of Archaeology UCLA publications, pp. 9–22
