= Battle of Alessandria =

1391 battle in Italy

- Part of the First Florentine–Milanese War
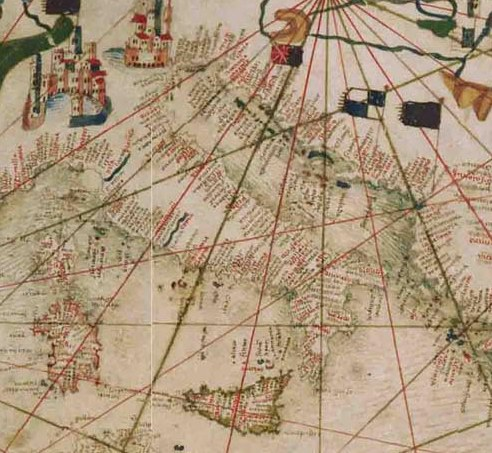
- Battle of Alessandria
Date	25 July 1391
Location	Alessandria, Piedmont, Italy 44°55′N 08°37′E
Result	Milanese victory

Belligerents
Lordship of Milan	County of Armagnac, in support of the Republic of Florence

Commanders and leaders
Jacopo dal Verme	Jean III of Armagnac †

Strength
10,000 (incl. 6,000 knights)	10,500 (incl. 7,500 knights)

Casualties and losses
Unknown	Thousands killed 6,000 captured

The Battle of Alessandria or Battle of Castelazzo was a battle during the Florentine–Milanese Wars which was fought at Alessandria, Piedmont, Italy on 25 July 1391 between the mercenary army of Gian Galeazzo Visconti of Milan and a French army in Florentine service, under Jean III of Armagnac. It ended in victory for Milan.

== Background ==
Gian Galeazzo Visconti of Milan, later the Duke of Milan, had ambitions to control the whole of northern Italy, but the city of Florence stood up against him and formed a defensive League which included Francis Novello da Carrara, Stephen III of Bavaria, and Jean III of Armagnac. In March 1390, they hired the English mercenary, John Hawkwood, and his private army to defend the town and requested help from Jean III.

Hawkwood prepared defensive earthworks and repulsed an attack by a Milanese army led by General Jacopo dal Verme. He then dug in at Pandino, some 10 miles south-east of Milan, in June 1391 to await the arrival of Jean III, who was crossing the Alps from France with his army. However, after being continually harassed by Dal Verme's troops, Hawkwood's men struck camp and retreated from the district.

== Battle of Alessandria ==
On June 29, the army of the Count of Armagnac, with 3,000 infantry and 7,500 cavalry, after crossing Montferrat, he faced the plain in front of Alessandris and laid siege to the village of Castellazzo Bormida, defended, perhaps, by the inhabitants alone.

On July 25 Jacopo dal Verme (who in the meantime had arrived in Alexandria with about 4,000 infantry, partly crossbowmen and partly pikemen, and 6,000 cavalry) sent a hundred horsemen to scout nearby of the enemy camp, the action annoyed Armagnac to such an extent that, after listening to mass and drinking a cup of wine, he decided to answer to the provocation of the viscounts by leading 1,500 knights in pursuit of enemy knights. But the charge of the French stopped at about a mile from the walls of Alessandria; here the riders dismounted from their animals and, closing ranks, they continued on foot in the direction of the enemies. So, Jacopo dal Verme, who with his men had come out of Porta Genovese (a city gate) seeing that there fear was taking hold of his troops he also dismounted and was immediately imitated by his knights.

Jacopo dal Verme, before starting the battle, sent a group of knights to explore to understand if the 1,500 French knights he was facing were the vanguard of the Count of Armagnac's army or if they were the only units deployed by the French commander. After the scouts informed him that there were no other enemy formations behind the 1,500 French cavalry gathered around the count of Armagnac, Jacopo dal Verme divided the reserves into three corps: the first, under the command of Broglia da Trino and Brandolino da Bagnocavallo moved by Bergoglio (a suburb of Alessandria), while at the same time, Calcino Tornielli, from Porta Marengo, would have struck the enemies on the flank and, inside the walls, other units would have been gathered ready to tuck in the men of dal Verme deployed outside the Porta Genovese.

After three hours of melee, the men of the Count of Armagnac began to retreat nervously looking for their squires, who guarded their precious mounts at a certain distance from the battlefield. But the hope of being able to quickly get their horses back turned out to be vain: the men of Broglia and Bardolino, moving behind the transalpine knights, had in the meantime captured both their squires and their horses. As soon as the French, constantly harassed by the men of the dal Verme, realized what had happened, they broke the line and gave themselves to a desperate flight towards the camp. The Visconti forces pursued them, killed numerous enemies and captured the Count of Armagnac, taken from the family members of Filippo da Pisa and 500 knights. Probably satisfied with the victory obtained, Jacopo dal Verme did not push his men towards the enemy camp, where most of Armagnac's forces were still located, and preferred to return to the city to reorganize his army.

When the besiegers of Castellazzo Bormida (about 6,000 French knights) learned of the defeat, they abandoned their intentions and withdrew to Nizza Monferrato. At this point, Jacopo dal Verme left Alessandria in pursuit of the French knights and at dawn attacked them knights, foot soldiers and crossbowmen between Nizza Monferrato and Incisa. We do not know how bloody the fight was, however, as reported by the ambassadors of Siena, the Visconti army defeated the French again and many knights of the Count of Armagnac surrendered to Jacopo dal Verme. We do not know the exact number of dead, but according to contemporary sources, the army of Gian Galeazzo Visconti managed to capture around 6,000 French knights in the two clashes (many of them were freed after paying a ransom and Jacopo dal Verme himself collected numerous ransoms) and several thousand horses and armor. Furthermore, the two ambassadors of Florence alongside the army of the Count of Armagnac were also captured, together with the 25,000 florins they were carrying to pay the French knights.

== Aftermath ==
As a result of the battle Gian Galeazzo Visconti effectively gained control of northern Italy. He received the title of Duke of Milan in 1395 from Wenceslaus, King of the Romans.
