= Cytaeum =

Coordinates: 35°24′32″N 24°52′09″E

Cytaeum or Kytaion (Ancient Greek: Κύταιον) was a town on the north coast of ancient Crete. It is mentioned by Ptolemy, Pliny the Elder, Nonnus, and Stephanus of Byzantium. Cytaeum minted coins dated to c. 350-325 BCE with the inscription «ΚΥ».

The site of Cytaeum is tentatively located near modern Almyrida.
