= Doxa (cave) =

Cave in Crete, Greece

- Location within Greece
- Location: Crete, Greece
- Coordinates: 35°22′N 25°0′E
- Elevation: 463
- Entrances: 1
- Show cave length: 50
- Lighting: No
- Visitors: Yes
- Features: Curtains, Stalactites and Stalagmites

Doxa is a small but well-known cave in Marathos, on the island of Crete in Greece.

There is a taverna located right next to the mouth of the cave. You can borrow flashlights at this taverna which is essential to go into the cave.

From the entrance begins a downhill corridor that leads to four rooms. The name Doxa means glory in Greek.
