= Agia Pelagia =

Seaside resort in Crete

Coordinates: 35.406821°N 25.018487°E

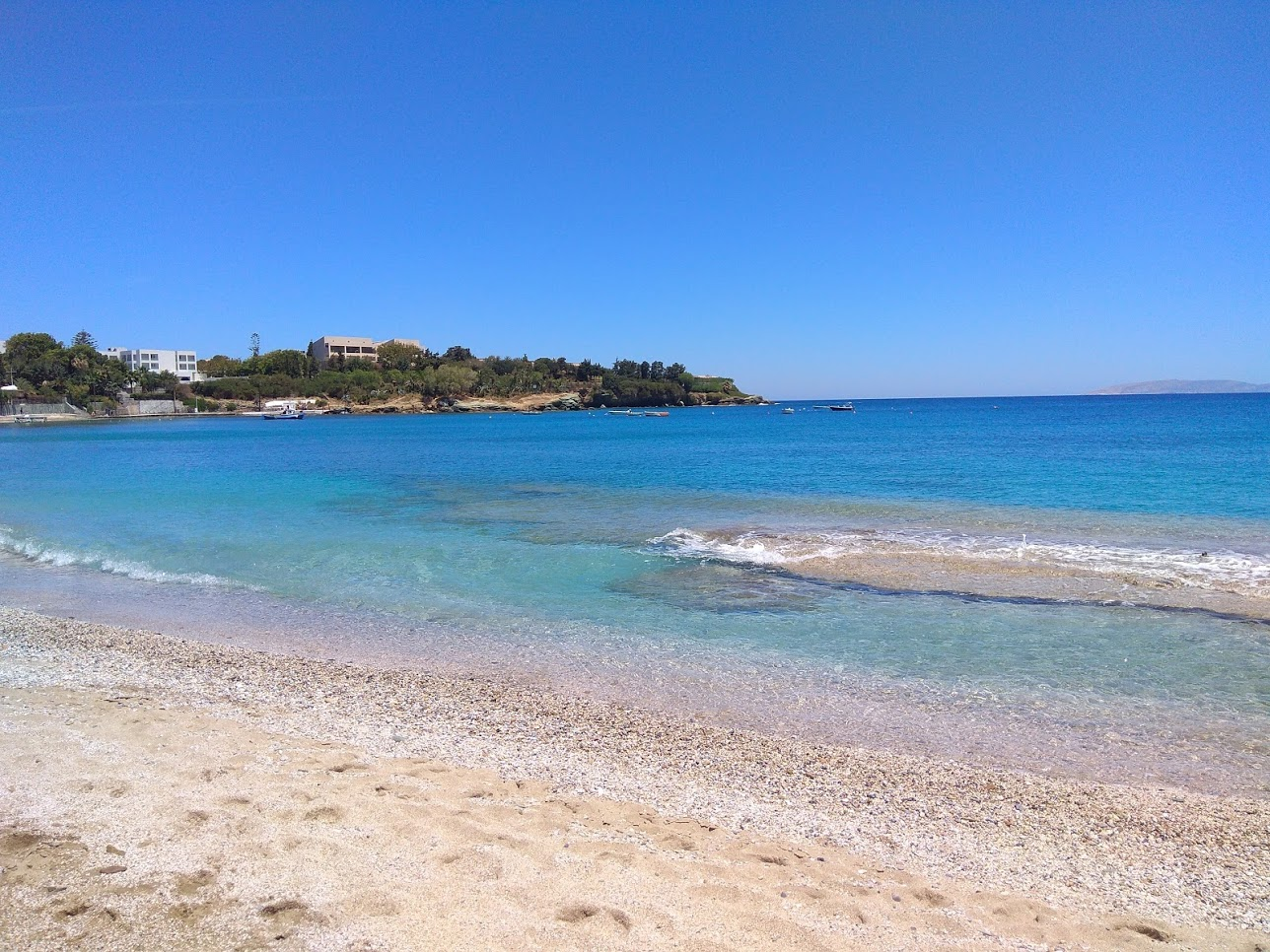
Agia Pelagia Beach

Agia Pelagia (Greek: Αγία Πελαγία, "Saint Pelagia") is a popular seaside resort in the municipality of Malevizi, 23 km northwest of Crete's capital city of Heraklion. In former times, Agia Pelagia was a tiny fishing village and a place for the residents of nearby Achlada village to grow their crops. Today, the village built at the center of a picturesque amphitheatric bay has been transformed into a bustling tourist resort featuring five-star hotels, traditional seaside tavernas, cafes, bars, internet cafés, ATMs, and souvenir shops.

The village takes its name from the homonymous church, in the Monastery of the Sebbathians, ruins of which are found at a distance of 1 km west of the village. The beaches of the village are popular with locals and tourists because they are sheltered by the rock outcroppings that almost encircle Agia Pelagia Bay.

Agia Pelagia was heavily damaged by the 2022 Greek floods.

== Archaeology ==
The first major excavations at Agia Pelagia were carried out at Cape Souda, near Evresi Cave, by Sir Arthur Evans. It was archaeologist Stylianos Alexiou, along with Dr. Athanasia Kanta, who performed the majority of later research. Alexiou, and others put forward the hypothesis that Agia Pelagia was the site of ancient Panormos (Ancient Greek: Πάνορμος), also known as Aulopotamos (Αὐλοπόταμος). At the north end of Agia Pelagia Bay, remnants of excavations of the Hellenistic town of Apollonia (Ancient Greek: Ἀπελλωνία), also Apollonia (Ἀπολλωνία) can still be seen.

The legendary archaeologist John Pendlebury classified surface finds discovered at Agia Pelagia as "implied" proof of a Late Minoan settlement there. Post-Minoan graves and the University (Prtanion) of the 4th century BC were found in 1970 at the site "Kladistos" or "Kladotos". Also, there is a nearby cave, with the name "Evresi", where - according to legend - local people found the icon of Agia Pelagia.

The village also has outcrops of blue-greenschist rock which was quarried and used to pave streets and floors of Minoan palaces between 1650 and 1600 BC.
