= Arkaliospilio =

Cave in Crete, Greece

- Location within Greece
- Location: Crete, Greece
- Coordinates: 35°22′N 25°0′E
- Entrances: 1
- Show cave length: 153
- Lighting: No
- Visitors: Yes
- Features: Stalactites and Stalagmites

Arkaliospilio is a cave to the southwest of Marathos. Roman, Byzantine and medieval conches have been found in the cave. Situated at an altitude of 545 meters, near the abandoned quarry at Arkalokefalo, the cave's entrance measures approximately 2.1 meters in width and 1 meter in height, often concealed by dense vegetation. The cave extends for about 153 meters, comprising four large chambers and two smaller ones, all adorned with impressive stalactites and stalagmites.

Visitors to Arkaliospilio can experience its natural beauty and historical significance. The cave remains largely unexplored, suggesting it may extend further into the mountain. To reach the cave, one must traverse a path through dense vegetation, passing through gates used for goat enclosures. It's advisable to close these gates carefully and be prepared for a 15-20 minute walk from the nearest parking area near the quarry entrance.

The nearby village of Marathos, located at an altitude of 300 meters, offers additional attractions such as the Doxa cave and the Yiannis Klinakis Art Gallery. Visitors can also enjoy traditional Cretan cuisine at local tavernas and purchase local sweets and bread from the women's association of the settlement

== Archaeological excavations ==
Archaeological excavations have uncovered artifacts from Roman, Byzantine, and Medieval periods, indicating the cave's historical use as a place of worship. During the Ottoman occupation, it also served as a refuge for Christians.
