= Francesco Basilicata =

17th-century Italian cartographer and military engineer

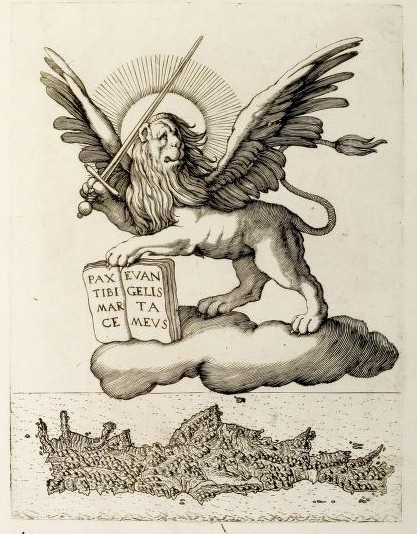
Map of Crete with the winged Lion of St. Mark, from The Entire Kingdom of Candia by Marco Boschini, 1651

Francesco Basilicata (died c. 1640) was a 17th-century Italian cartographer and military engineer. Basilicata worked in the service of the Republic of Venice and is known for his maps and drawings of the island of Crete.

== Life ==
Very little is known about Basilicata's life. Gerola has suggested that he might have been from Palermo. Other sources claim that he was from Campania and came to Basilicata to work. When he returned home, he would have taken the surname Basilicata. However, it is certain that Basilicata lived on Crete for several years during the first decades of the 17th century, near the end of the Venetian presence on the island.

== Work ==
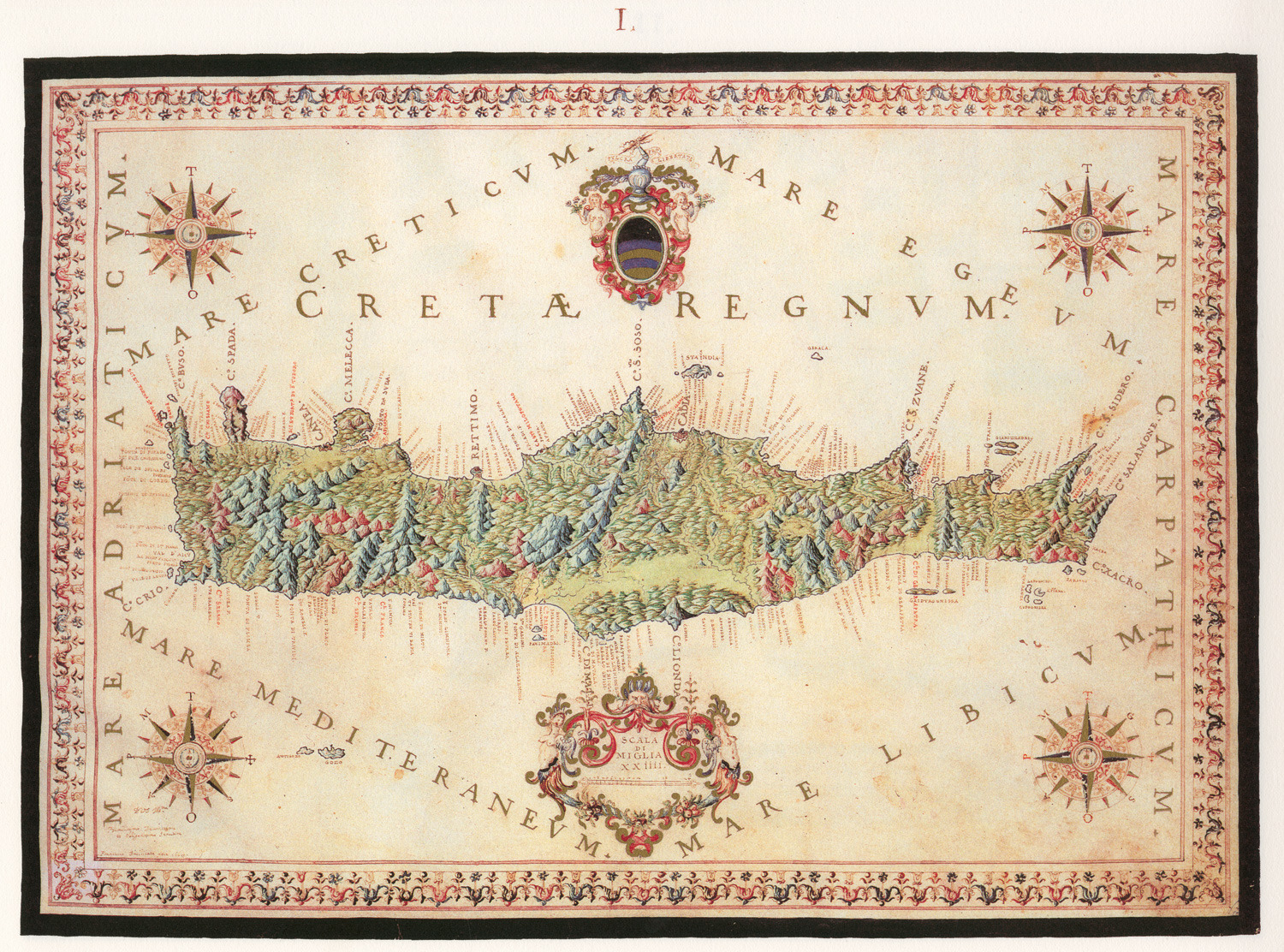
Isola di Candia by Basilicata, 1618

Basilicata probably arrived on Crete around 1609, at a time when the island was an overseas colony of the Republic of Venice known as the Kingdom of Candia after its capital, Candia or Chandax (modern Heraklion). During the course of several years and based on his first-hand experience, Basilicata produced three different sets of drawings and maps (dated 1612, 1618–19, and 1629–30). His Atlas, composed around 1618 and today preserved in Museo Correr, is his most famous work.

Basilicata makes skillful use of color to highlight the topography of each region. He meticulously draws every important detail in an aesthetically pleasing manner and often uses vantage points which are unusual and original for the time. In addition to maps, Basilicata also produced several manuscripts concerned mainly with the state of the fortifications of Crete, but also its geography, history, archaeology, administration, and economy.

It has been suggested that Basilicata's 1612 map was copied by Marco Boschini, whose 1651 map entitled The Entire Kingdom of Candia strongly influenced the cartography of Crete in Italy and abroad. However, other authors do not accept this claim and, despite not denying Basilicata's influence on Boschini's map, consider the latter to be the result of collective work by several engineers.
