= Malevizi =

Malevizi Μαλεβίζι
- Municipality
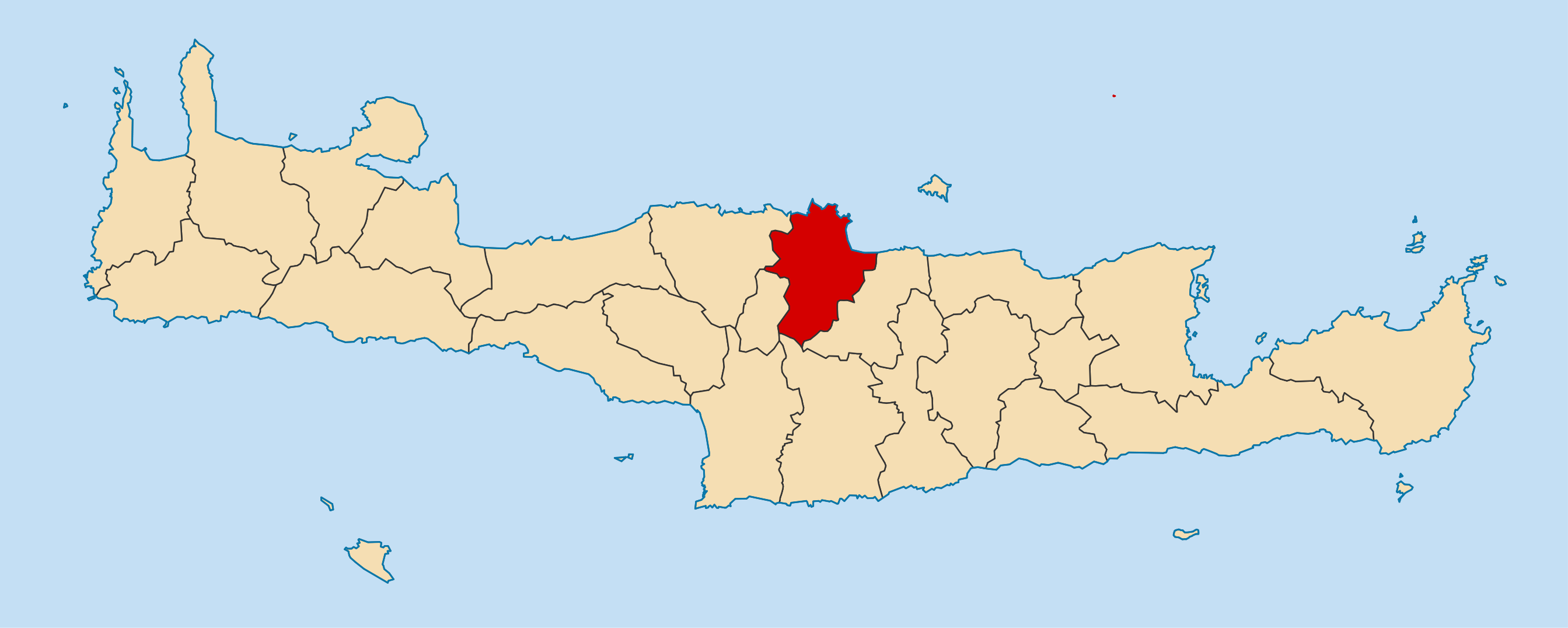

- Location within Greece
- Coordinates: 35°22′N 25°00′E
- Country: Greece
- Administrative region: Crete
- Regional unit: Heraklion
- Seat: Gazi

Area
  - Municipality: 291.9 km^{2} (112.7 sq mi)

Population (2021)
  - Municipality: 25,734
  - Density: 88.16/km^{2} (228.3/sq mi)
- Time zone: UTC+2 (EET)
  - Summer (DST): UTC+3 (EEST)

Malevizi (Greek: Μαλεβίζι) is a municipality in Heraklion regional unit, Crete, Greece. The seat of the municipality is the town of Gazi. The municipality has an area of 291.907 km^{2} (112.706 sq mi).

== Municipality ==
The municipality Malevizi was formed at the 2011 local government reform by the merger of the following 3 former municipalities, that became municipal units:

- Gazi
- Krousonas
- Tylisos

== Province ==
The province of Malevizi (Greek: Επαρχία Μαλεβιζίου) was one of the provinces of the Heraklion Prefecture. Its territory corresponded with that of the current municipality Malevizi, the municipal unit Gorgolainis and parts of Paliani and Heraklion. It was abolished in 2006.
