= 2021 Arkalochori earthquake =

Earthquake in Crete, Greece

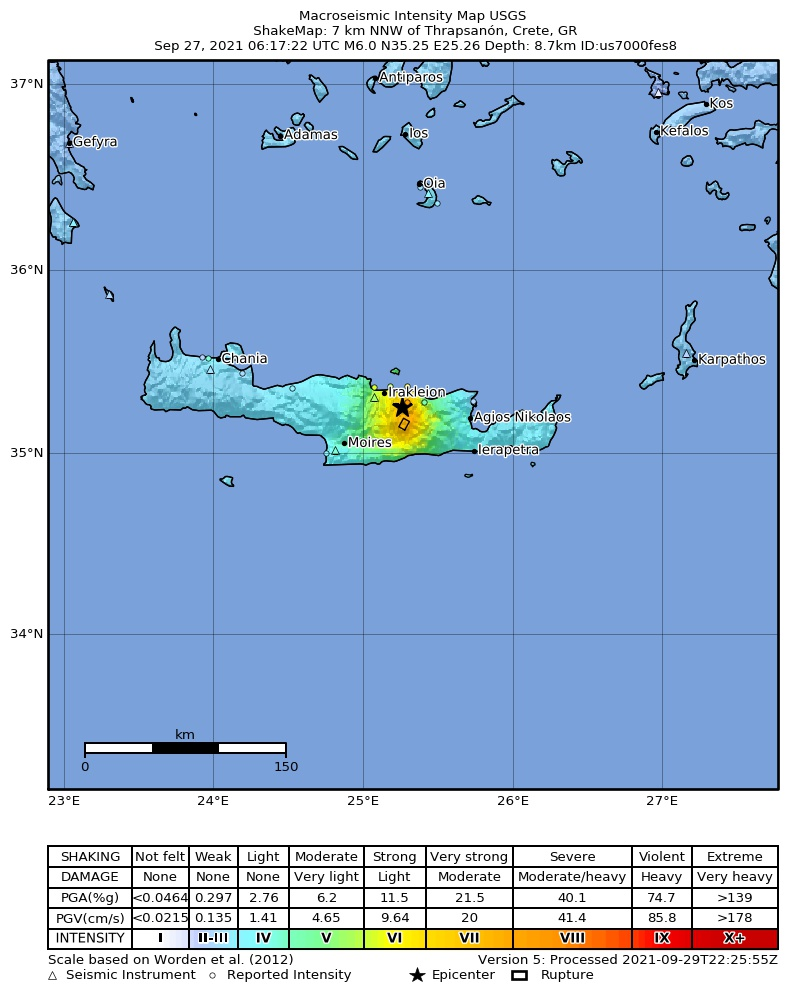

- Location within Greece
- UTC time: 2021-09-27 06:17:22
- ISC event: 621110572
- USGS-ANSS: ComCat
- Local date: 27 September 2021
- Local time: 09:17:22
- Magnitude: 6.0 M_{w}^{(EMSC)} 6.0 M_{w}^{(USGS)} 5.8 M_{L}^{(IOG)}
- Depth: 6 km (3.7 mi)
- Epicenter: 35.252°N 25.260°E
- Type: Normal
- Max. intensity: MMI VIII (Severe)
- Peak acceleration: 0.82 g at Arkalochori
- Aftershocks: Multiple, largest is a M_{w} 5.3
- Casualties: 1 dead, 36 injured

A moment magnitude 6.0 earthquake struck the island of Crete in Greece at a depth of 6 km on 27 September 2021. The epicenter of the earthquake was located southeast of Heraklion. The quake killed one person, injured 36 (one indirect) and damaged over 5,000 old buildings on the island.

== Tectonic setting ==
This region in the Mediterranean is part of the Hellenic arc and is known for its frequent and violent seismic activity and is home to Europe's deadliest earthquakes. The island of Crete in particular lies above a convergent boundary where the Aegean Sea and African plates meet, specifically the African plate subducting beneath the Aegean Sea. The process of subduction along the Hellenic subduction zone makes the region prone to large earthquakes and tsunamis. The ~M_{w} 8.0–8.5 earthquake in Crete in 365 AD and 1303 are examples of subduction zone events. In 1810 and 1856, Crete was struck by large intermediate-depth intraplate earthquakes which were devastating and felt strongly in Africa and the Levant. The 1810 and 1856 earthquakes occurred within the subducting African plate rather than at the plate boundary.

During the Holocene period, the island of Crete has been affected by a combination of east–west extension on north northeast–south southwest trending normal faults and north–south extension on WNW-ESE trending normal faults. The local tectonic movement on these two fault sets are 0.3–1.3 mm/yr and 0.6–1.0 mm/yr respectively. These faults range from 3 km to 30 km in length and can produce earthquakes of magnitude of 7.0 at their maximum.

The epicentre of the earthquake lies within the Heraklion sedimentary basin, which is fault-controlled. The Kastelli Fault forms the near the east edge of the Heraklion basin, and is the most active. Other faults in the region include the Geraki Fault, and the Nipiditos Fault. The Nipiditos Fault is exposed fault near the epicentral area and truncates the southward prolongation of both the Geraki and Kastelli Faults. It is the youngest structure in the area.

== Earthquake ==
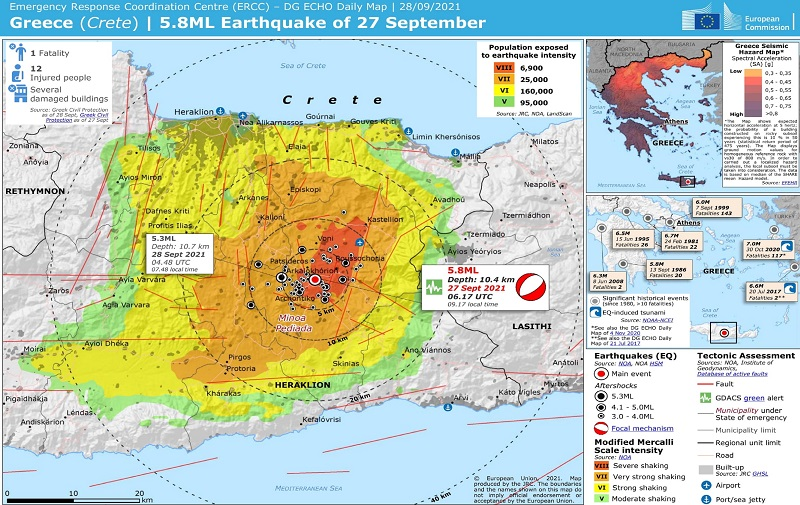
Map which shows 5.8 ML Earthquake on 27 September 2021 in Arkalochori

An initial measurement of M_{w} 6.5 was obtained by the European-Mediterranean Seismological Centre (EMSC), and later downgraded to 6.0. The United States Geological Survey (USGS) said the event was M_{w} 6.0 at 8.7 km depth. Normal faulting was indicated by the focal mechanism. According to Greece's Institute of Geodynamics, the earthquake had a local magnitude of M_{L} 5.8.

According to Konstantinos Papazachos, a professor of geophysics at the Aristotle University of Thessaloniki in Thessaloniki, the probability of the earthquake being a foreshock to a larger event is small. The professor added that the earthquake with its magnitude was large enough for the active faults in Crete, and that strong aftershocks are expected. The earthquake occurred along a shallow crustal fault on the island. He stated that some faults on the island have been the subject of geological studies, but they have not shown any signs of past seismic activity. The fault responsible for the quake was identified as the Kastelli Fault; a north northeast–south southwest trending normal fault with a length of 13 km, dipping at an angle of 70° to the west.

According to scientists at the Geodynamic Institution, Arkalochori subsided by up to 15 cm. A maximum ground subsidence of ~22 cm was estimated from the displacement decomposition in the vertical (up-down) direction. There was also horizontal (east-west) displacement observed, with eastward movement up to 14 cm to the west of Arckalochori and westward movement up to 7 cm to the east of Arckalochori.

=== Foreshocks and aftershocks ===
The mainshock itself is part of an earthquake swarm which began four months earlier. The increased activity started on 1 June 2021 and continued until the noon of 25 September 2021 (last event on 13:11:13.0 UTC). The largest foreshock of Mw4.8 occurred on 24 July 2021. Spatially the foreshock activity concentrated a relatively small area covering only partly the area that was later occupied by the southern aftershock cluster. The foreshock's focal depths ranged between 5 and 20 km with an average of 10.6 ± 2.3 km.

A warning was issued on Facebook to Arkalochori and the surrounding area by a scientist at the Athens Geodynamic Institute after a magnitude 3.7 foreshock occurred the week before.

Following the earthquake were more than 10 aftershocks greater or equal to magnitude 4.0. The strongest aftershock was a M_{w} 5.3 occurring the day later. The strongest aftershock had a maximum intensity of VIII (Severe), collapsing several already damaged but unoccupied homes. A total of 2,000 aftershocks were recorded. The aftershocks were groupped in a southern and northern cluster. The southern cluster is the most extensive one, nearly overlaps with the deformation area. The seismogenic layer of aftershocks ranges in depth from 5 to about 20 km with the average depth being 15.1 ± 4.1 km. All the earthquakes of magnitude ≥ 4.0 that occurred in the entire foreshock-main shock-aftershock sequence ruptured within the southern aftershock cluster. Additionally, the largest aftershocks of magnitude ≥ 4.6 occurred within the first three days from the mainshock occurrence.

Local officials said strong aftershocks with the potential to cause further damage is expected, and that it is not abnormal. The aftershock sequence is expected to last 20 to 30 days after the mainshock, and residents were urged not to approach any damaged buildings.

2021 Crete earthquake aftershock sequence (only aftershocks greater than 4.0)
Time (UTC)	Location	Magnitude	Depth (km)	MMI	Remarks
2021-09-27 06:17:22	7 km NNW of Thrapsanón	6.0	8.7	VIII	Mainshock. One killed, 36 injured.
2021-09-27 06:27:46	2 km N of Profítis Ilías	4.1	10.0	-	
2021-09-27 06:37:45	Crete	4.6	7.4	IV	
2021-09-27 07:30:46	1 km N of Kokkíni Cháni	4.5	10.0	IV	
2021-09-27 07:46:31	8 km W of Arkalochóri	4.2	10.0	III	
2021-09-27 08:21:58	4 km E of Kastélli	4.4	10.0	-	
2021-09-27 10:23:13	6 km SSE of Goúrnes	4.3	10.0	-	
2021-09-27 10:34:22	2 km NNW of Kastélli	4.3	10.0	-	
2021-09-27 11:02:25	6 km NE of Pýrgos	4.8	10.0	IV	
2021-09-27 14:22:48	7 km WNW of Arkalochóri	4.4	10.0	IV	
2021-09-27 14:49:27	2 km SSW of Pýrgos	4.2	10.0	-	
2021-09-27 16:15:31	7 km W of Arkalochóri	4.4	11.2	-	
2021-09-27 20:10:01	5 km W of Thrapsanón	4.7	10.0	IV	
2021-09-27 21:37:11	3 km NW of Kastélli	4.3	10.0	IV	
2021-09-28 04:48:08	8 km SW of Arkalochóri	5.3	10.0	VIII	Largest aftershock. Further damage.
2021-09-28 15:13:16	1 km N of Thrapsanón	4.7	10.0	IV	
2021-09-29 11:54:48	2 km N of Pýrgos	4.6	10.0	II	
2021-10-02 18:31:07	11 km SW of Pýrgos	4.1	10.0	-	
2021-10-03 14:31:27	2 km W of Arkalochóri	4.6	10.0	-	
2021-10-20 02:44:04	10 km ENE of Pýrgos	4.3	7.3	IV	
2021-10-21 08:12:57	2 km W of Thrapsanón	4.8	10.0	IV	
2021-10-21 09:38:39	8 km NE of Pýrgos	4.6	10.0	V	
2021-10-22 17:12:50	3 km SE of Arkalochóri	4.3	10.0	V	

=== Ground motion ===
According to the Institute of Engineering Seismology and Earthquake Engineering (ITSAK), the instrumentally recorded peak ground acceleration (pga) was 0.82 g in Arkalochori. This exceeded the building codes strength as they are only enforced for pga values of 0.24 g. A University of Bristol professor in earthquake engineering said that such pga values are unsurprising as the town is located close to the earthquake rupture. The pga in this event is significantly higher than the one at Larissa during the March 2021 earthquake.

== Other events ==
About two weeks after the event a magnitude 6.4 earthquake struck the eastern part of Crete. The second earthquake was said to have been unconnected to this earthquake but was instead the possible activation of the eastern portion of the seismic arc located nearby. Despite being larger the September 27 quake, the shock caused no casualties. Severe damage was reported in Zakros, where a church collapsed.

== Impact ==
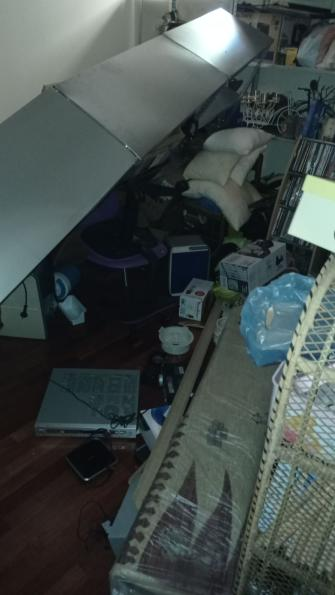
Damage at a warehouse caused by the earthquake.

According to local officials, more than 5,000 structures were destroyed, damaged or unsafe for use.

At Arkalochori, 80% of the town's buildings were damaged with varying extent. A preliminary inspection of the town found that 60% of the town's buildings were damaged. In Heraklion, 40 schools were confirmed damaged. One person died when the church he was working in collapsed. The son of the man who perished was also injured in the collapse. Another person was trapped in the collapse of a house. Thirty-five individuals were also injured, two with fractured bones and the rest minor abrasions, all treated at nearby medical facilities. Among the injured were a pair who suffered minor head injuries due to falling rocks. Two seniors were transported to a hospital following orthopedic injuries. Landslides near Profitis Ilias resulted in the closure of roads leading to the town, and damaging at least one vehicle.

Kato Poulies, located in the Minoa Pediada municipality was nearly destroyed, with only two homes left intact. The other homes were badly damaged and at the risk of collapse. Many of the village residents became homeless and sought refuge under a tree. A supermarket in nearby Arkalochori provided the displaced residents with drinking water.

A new inspection of 415 homes in the Heraklion area found that 11 were damaged beyond repair, 292 requiring repair, and 40 safe for use. At least 52 schools in the Municipality of Heraklion were damaged. In the Archanes-Asterousia municipality, the quake damaged 10. In total, 89 schools were affected in municipalities including Minoa Plain, Gortyna, Hersonissos, Phaistos, and Malevizi. By October 1, inspectors had surveyed 2,613 homes across five municipalities, finding at least 1,784 unafe for use. Inspectors found 106 buildings for business unsuitable during the survey. The number of unsafe warehouses totaled to 184 after the inspection.

On 30 September, a volunteer cook in Arkalochori suffered a fall when he lost his balance while resting on a windowsill. The person sustained injuries and was transported to the temporary health center for treatment.

== Gallery ==
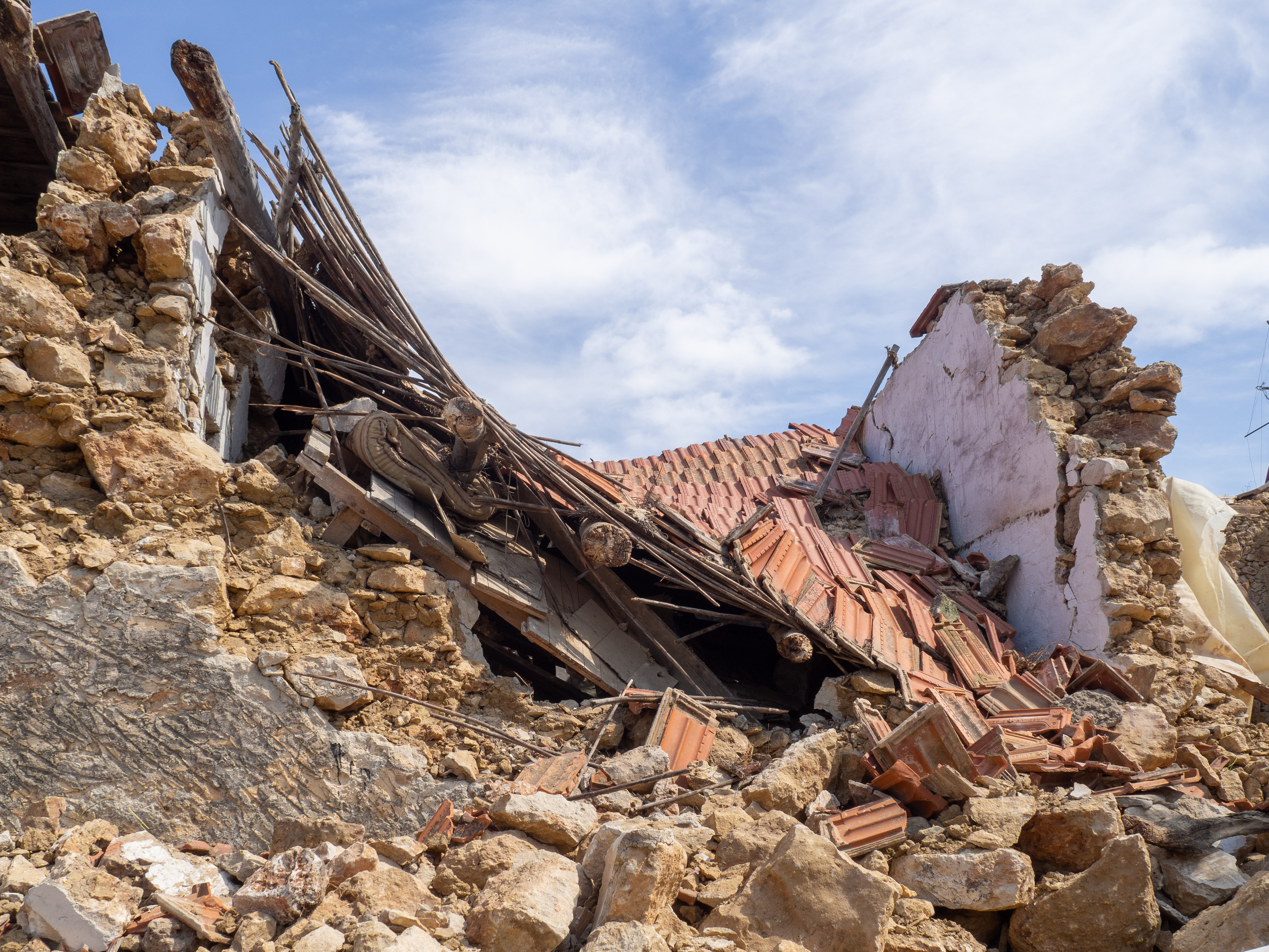

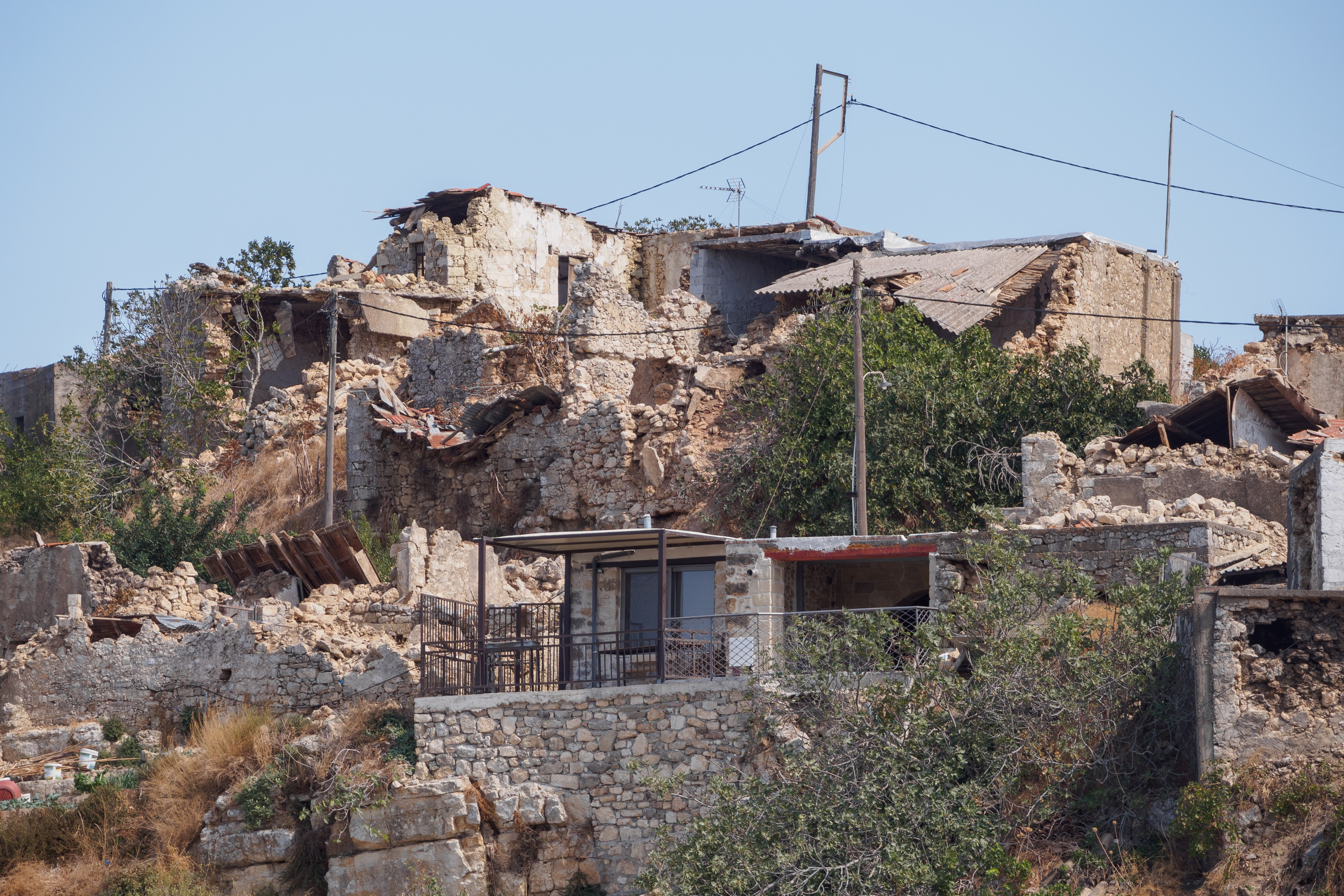

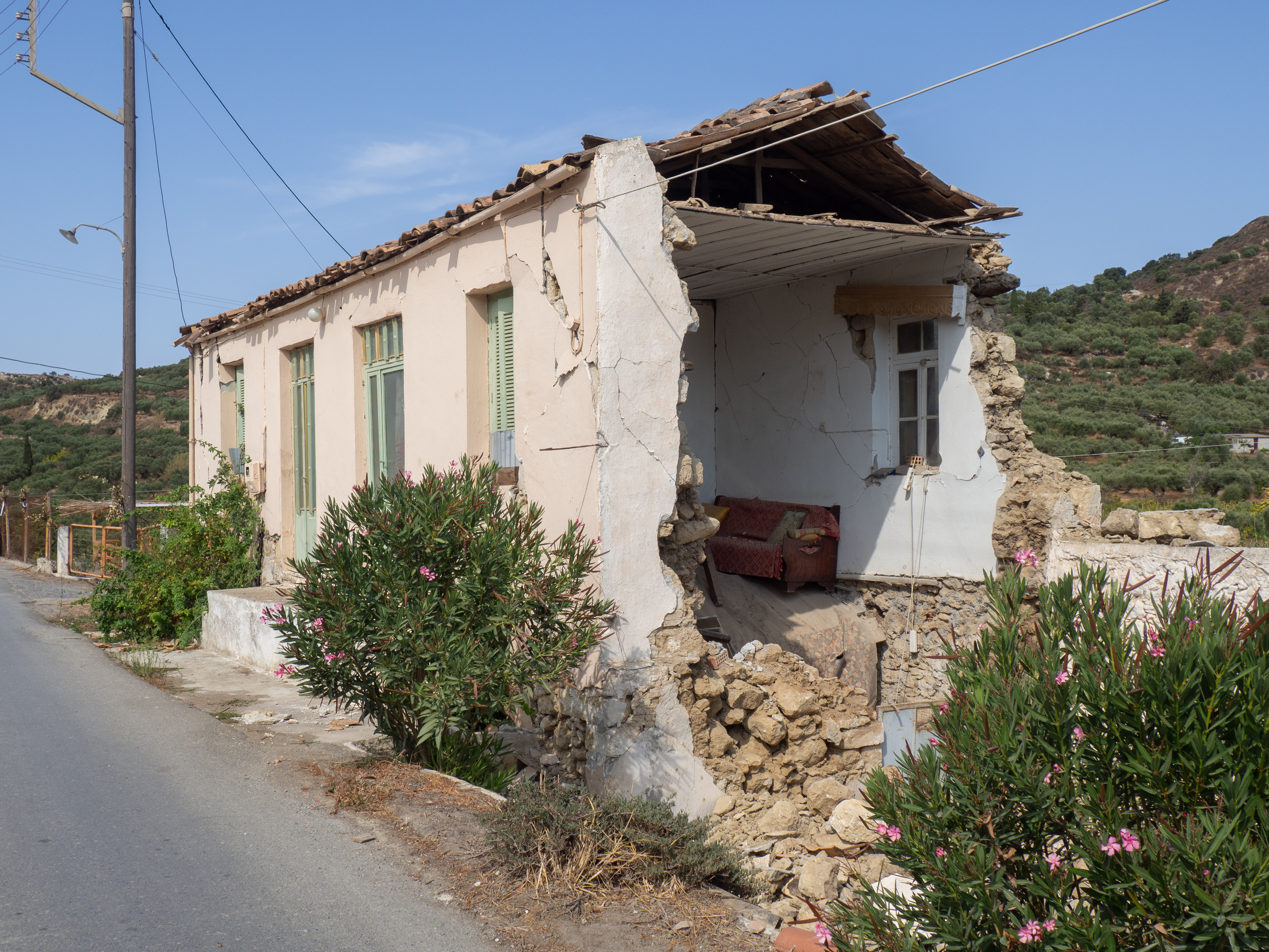

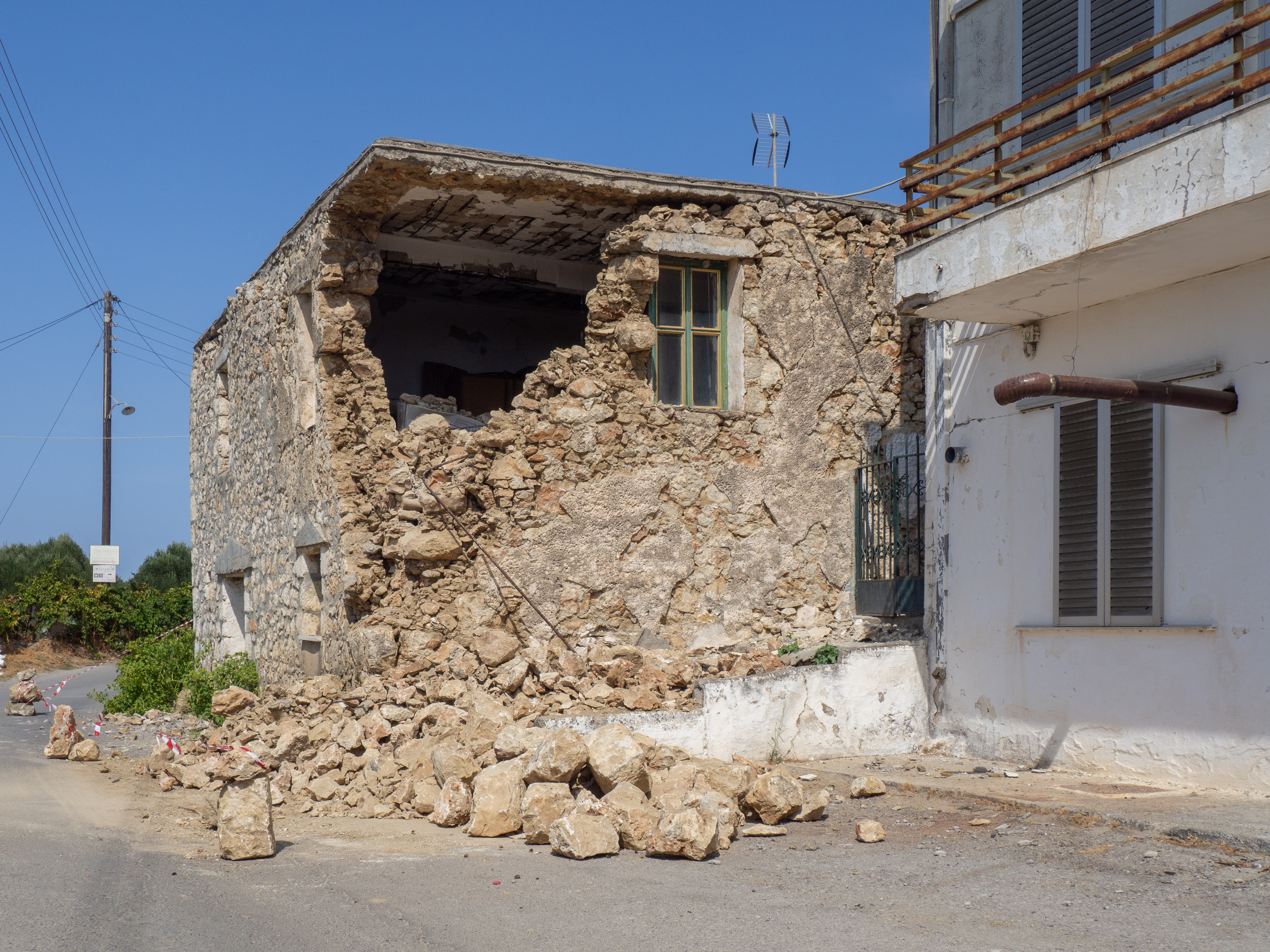

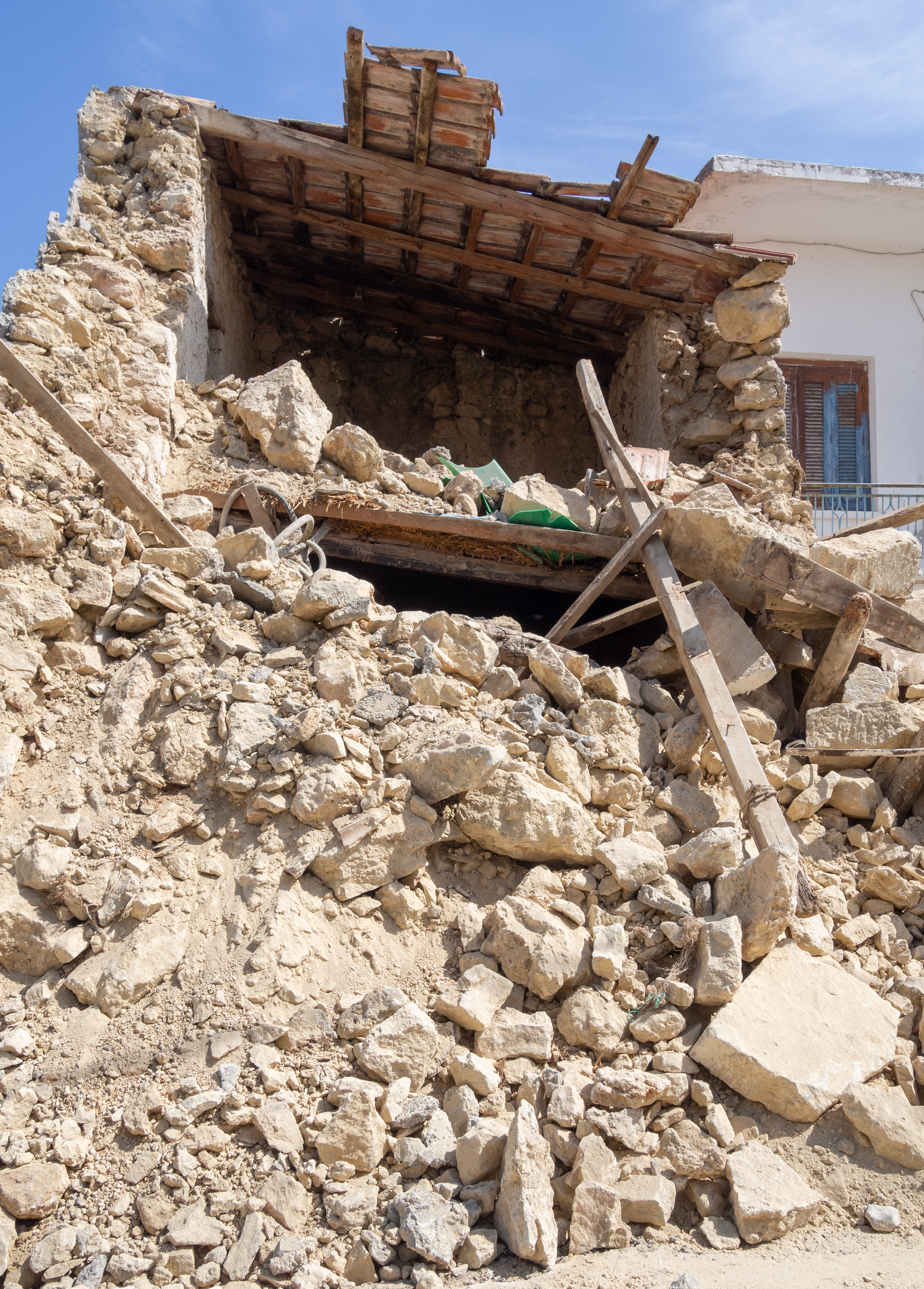

== Response ==
The Minister of Climate Crisis and Civil Protection of Greece, Christos Stylianides is to have flown to Crete. Nikos Syrigonakis, vice-governor of Heraklion said that all schools within the administrative region would be closed until further notice. Greek Deputy Regional Minister of Education Efi Koutentaki added that all schools in the Heraklion regional unit are to be closed for two days in order to allow damage evaluation works. Some 20 engineers from the Ministry of Infrastructure and Transport were assigned to evaluate and inspect the buildings on the island. Thirty firefighters from the Hellenic Fire Service were flown into Crete via a C-130 aircraft, along with rescue dogs and equipment. According to Stylianidis, local officials have set-up tents for the temporary accommodation of up to 2,500 people. Authorities in Greece have urged local residents to stay away from damaged buildings due to the risk of collapse. The Ministry of Health of Crete have set-up a health facility overnight to respond to the injured and sick. Prime Minister Kyriakos Mitsotakis was expected to arrive on the island at 16:00 local time, alongside other officials and ministers.

A basic compensation of €600 would be handled by the government to each affected household. An additional 600 euros would be given to families whose homes were damaged, and each disabled family member will also receive another 600 euros. Households will get another 6,000 euros to do repair works for their damaged homes. Injured individuals are also given 4,500 euros in financial assistance. A quick compensation of 5,000 and 8,000 euros were given to individuals to replace damaged household and business items. Telecommunication costs for the victims were also covered.

The Crete Half Marathon originally scheduled to take place in Arkalochori on October 3 was cancelled.

== See also ==
- 1856 Heraklion earthquake
- 2021 Lasithi earthquake
- List of earthquakes in 2021
- List of earthquakes in Greece
