= List of earthquakes in Greece =

Map of earthquakes in Greece and adjacent countries 1900–2023

This list of earthquakes in Greece includes notable earthquakes that have affected Greece during recorded history. This list is currently incomplete, representing only a fraction of the possible events.

== Tectonic setting ==
Greece is located at the complex boundary zone in the eastern Mediterranean between the African plate and the Eurasian plate. The northern part of Greece lies on the Eurasian plate while the southern part lies on the Aegean Sea plate. The Aegean Sea plate is moving southwestward with respect to the Eurasian plate at about 30 mm/yr while the African plate is subducting northwards beneath the Aegean Sea plate at a rate of about 40 mm/yr. The northern plate boundary is a relatively diffuse divergent boundary while the southern convergent boundary forms the Hellenic arc.

These two plate boundaries give rise to two contrasting tectonic styles, extension on east–west trending fault zones with strike-slip tectonics on SW-NE trending fault zones throughout west and central Greece, Peloponnese and the northern Aegean and contractional in the southern Aegean, continuing around to the Ionian Islands. The south Aegean is the location of the volcanic arc and is characterised by extension. To the east of Crete along the Hellenic Arc, strike-slip tectonics with some extension become important.

The strongest earthquakes historically are those associated with the Hellenic Arc, although none larger than about 7.2 have been observed instrumentally. The events of AD 365 and 1303 are likely to have been much larger than this. In mainland Greece, normal faulting gives earthquakes up to 7 in magnitude, while in the northern Aegean, strike-slip events with a magnitude of 7.2 have been recorded. Large intermediate depth (>50 km) earthquakes of magnitude >7 from within the subducting African plate have been recorded but such events cause little damage, although they are widely felt.

== Earthquakes ==
Date	Place	Lat	Lon	Deaths	Mag.	MMI	Comments	Sources
2022-01-09	Florina, Western Macedonia	40.842	21.376		5.5 M_{w}	VII	Several houses and buildings were damaged in Florina, while one uninhabited house collapsed in the village of Agia Paraskevi. Two people were hospitalized.	USGS
2021-10-12	Lasithi	35.193	26.256		6.4 M_{w}	VIII	A chapel was destroyed following the earthquake in the village of Xerokampos.	USGS
2021-09-27	Crete	35.252	25.260	1	6.0 M_{w}	VIII		USGS
2021-03-03	Larissa	39.755	22.176	1	6.3 M_{w}	VIII	1 death 3 injures	USGS
2020-12-02	Thiva	38.33	23.4644		5.1 M_{w}	VI	A cemetery was completely destroyed in the village of Kallithea, while in the same village a displacement of 6 cm was observed.	
2020-10-30	Near Samos, Aegean Sea	37.897	26.795	2	7.0 M_{w}	X	Greece:19 people were injured and 2 teenagers (15 and 17) killed. Turkey:The earthquake injured an additional 1,034 and killed 117 people.	USGS
2020-03-21	Parga, Epirus	39.357	20.638		5,7M_{w}	VII	The earthquake was particularly felt in Thesprotia and Preveza where people took to the streets, It was also felt in Ioannina, Arta, Corfu and in general in the wider area, the earthquake caused serious damage in Kanalaki. (2 injures)	USGS
2019-11-27	Aegean Sea, offshore Antikythera	35.63	23.21		6.1 M_{w}	VI	Depth of focus reached 56 km, making it perceived from more than 300 km away. Some damage.	CNN
2019-07-19	Athens	38.095	23.525		5.3 M_{w}	VII	7 injured and material damage to buildings, the epicenter of the earthquake was 23 km northwest of Athens and the focal depth was 10 km	USGS
2019-03-30	Galaxidi	38.366	22.394		5.4 M_{w}	VII	Minor damage was observed inside the buildings, while in Patras poles came out of their house	USGS
2018-10-26	Ionian Sea, offshore Zakynthos	37.478	20.56		6.8 M_{w}	VI	Sea level changes were observed, prompting a local tsunami warning.	USGS
2017-07-21	Kos	36.57	27.27	2	6.6 M_{w}	VII	Two dead and 150 people injured in Greece, 370 injured in Turkey	BBC
2017-06-12	Lesbos	38.93	26.37	1	6.3 M_{w}	IX	10+ people injured, significant damage across parts of the island	
2015-11-17	Lefkada	38.67	20.6	2	6.5 M_{w}	VIII	Four injured, A landslide in Egremni Beach two people dead.	
2014-05-24	Limnos	38.11	23.60	3	6.9 M_{w}	VIII	3 deaths and 324 injuries reported in Greece, dozens of houses collapsed.	
2014-01-26	Lixouri, Kefalonia, Ionian Sea	38.23	20.46		6.1 M_{w}	VIII	Several injured, significant damage across the western parts of the island	
2008-07-15	Dodecanese	35.93	27.81	1	6.4 M_{w}	VII		
2008-06-22	Methoni, Messenia, Peloponnese	36.00	21.90		6.0 M_{w}	VIII	There were four foreshocks before the main event / Earthquake swarm starting 14 February	
2008-06-08	Peloponnese	37.96	21.53	2	6.4 M_{w}	VIII	240 injured	
2008-02-20	Methoni, Messenia, Peloponnese	37.96	21.53		6.1 M_{w}	V	Earthquake swarm	
2008-02-14	Methoni, Messenia, Peloponnese	37.96	21.53		6.7 M_{w} & 6.6 M_{w}	V+	Back to back seismic events in the span of two hours approximately / Minor damage / Earthquake swarm that continued throughout the year	
2008-01-06	Leonidio, Arcadia				6.6 M_{w}			
2006-01-08	Kythira	36.26	23.46	1	6.7-6.9 M_{w}	VII	Three injured	
2005-10-18	Zakynthos				6.0 M_{w}		No injuries or damage	
2003-08-14	Lefkada	39	21		6.4 M_{w}	VIII		
2002-01-22	Crete – Karpathos	35.56	26.73		6.6 M_{w}		No injuries or damage	
1999-09-07	Athens	38.06	23.51	143	6.0 M_{w}	IX	1,600 injured / $3–4.2 billion in damage	
1995-06-15	Aigio	38.40	22.28	26	6.4 M_{w}	VIII	60 injuries / $660 million in damage	NGDC,
1995-05-13	Kozani–Grevena	40.15	21.70		6.6 M_{w}	VIII	12-25 injured / $450 million in damage	NGDC,
1990-12-21	Goumenissa – Edessa	40.92	22.36	1	6.1 M_{w}	VI	1 killed in Edessa/ 60 injured	USGS
1990-06-16	Preveza (regional unit)	39.1	20.4		6.0 M	VI	1 injured	
1988-10-16	Kyllini, Elis				6.0 M			
1986-09-13	Kalamata	37.01	22.18	20+	6.0 M_{w}	X	300 injured / $5 million in damage	
1981-12-19	Lesbos	39.00	25.26		7.2	VIII	7 buildings collapsed	
1981-02-24	Athens – Eastern Gulf of Corinth, Halcyon Islands.	38.22	22.93	20–22	6.7 M_{s}	IX	500 injured / $812 million in damage / 22,554 buildings destroyed around Athens/ Local tsunami. 2 strong earthquakes followed (6.4 M_{s} and 6.3 M_{s} )	
1980-07-09	Almyros, Magnesia (regional unit)	39.27	22.83		6.5	VIII	24 injured / 5,222 buildings completely destroyed	
1978-06-20	Thessaloniki	40.6	23.2	45–50	6.2–6.5 M_{w}	VIII	100–220 injured	
1973-11-29	Palaiochora, Crete	35.18	23.75		6.0 M_{w}	VII+		
1968-02-19	Agios Efstratios, Aegean Sea	39.37	25.96	20	7.1–7.2 M_{w}	X	39 injuries / Local tsunami	NGDC,
1967-05-01	Drosopighe, Arta (regional unit)	39.47	21.25	9	6.4	IX	56 injured	
1966-10-26	Katouna, Aetolia-Acarnania	38.78	21.11	1	6.0	VIII	43 injured	
1966-09-01	Megalopolis, Greece, Arcadia	37.39	22.14		5.4	VIII	24 injured	
1966-02-05	Kremasta (lake), Evrytania	39.05	21.75	1	6.2	IX	65 injured / 731 buildings collapsed	
1965-07-06	Erateini, Phocis	38.27	22.30	1	6.3	VIII	6 injured / 575 buildings collapsed	
1965-04-09	Kandanos, Crete	35.13	24.31		6.1	VI+		
1965-04-05	Apiditsa, Arcadia	37.40	22.10	18	6.1	VIII	17 injured / 1,426 buildings collapsed	
1965-03-09	Alonnisos	39.16	23.89	2	6.1	IX	2 injured / 1941 buildings collapsed	
1959-05-14	Pitsidia, Crete	35.00	24.72		6.3	VIII+	8 injured	
1957-04-25	Rhodes	36.50	28.60		7.2	VIII	In Turkish coast there were 18 fatalities and 3,000 buildings destroyed	
1956-07-09	Amorgos	36.67	25.957	53	7.5 M_{w}	IX	Triggered a tsunami that affected the entire Aegean Sea / 100 injuries	
1955-07-16	Samos – Agathonisi	37.55	27.05		6.9	VIII	2 injured	
1955-04-19	Lechonia, Magnesia (regional unit)	39.37	23.00	1	6.2	VIII	41 injured	
1954-04-30	Sofades, Karditsa (regional unit)	39.28	22.29	25–31	6.7-7.0 M_{w}	IX	6,559 buildings destroyed	
1953-10-21	Kandila, Aetolia-Acarnania	38.60	20.96		6.3	VIII		
1953-08-09	Cephalonia, Zakynthos	38.18	20.94	445–800	6.4 M_{w}, 6.8 M_{w} & 7.2 M_{w}	X	Two foreshocks and one major earthquake occurred in the span of three days / 2,412 injured / The islands of Cephalonia, Zakynthos and Ithaca were leveled. From the 33,300 buildings of these three islands, 27,659 were completely destroyed	
1947-10-06	Messenia, Peloponnese	36.96	21.68	3	7.0	IX	20 injured	
1941-03-01	Larissa, Thessaly	39.67	22.54	40	6.3	VIII	100 injured / In Larissa, 10% of the city's buildings have been completely destroyed and 60% seriously damaged	
1938-07-20	Oropos, East Attica	38.29	23.79	18	6.0	VIII	107 injured / 8,000 homeless	
1933-04-23	Kos	36.8	27.3	74-200	6.6	IX–X	600 injuries	
1932-09-26	Ierissos	39.8	23.8	161–491	7.0 M_{s}	X	Tsunami / 669 injuries / 4,106 buildings destroyed	
1928-04-22	Corinth	38	23	20	6.3 M_{s}	IX	3,000 homes destroyed / tsunami	NGDC,
1917-12-24	Nafpaktos	38.40	21.70		6.0	VIII		
1914-11-27	Lefkada	38.72	20.62	16	6.3	IX	Small tsunami	,
1904-08-11	Samos	37.66	26.93	4	6.8	VIII	7 injuries / 540 buildings destroyed	
1903-08-11	Ionian Sea, Kythira	36.00	23.00		7.9 M_{w}	IX	Tsunami	
1902-08-11	Assiros, Thessaloniki (regional unit)			5	6.6 M_{w}	IX		
1895-05-14	Paramythia, Thesprotia			75	6.3 M_{w}		46 injuries	
1894-04-27	Atalanti	38.65	23.08	255	6.7 M_{w} & 7.0 M_{w}	XI	Two earthquakes, 7 days apart / 3,783 buildings destroyed	
1893-05-23	Thebes	38.31	23.25	2	6.2	VIII	According to the available data, the seismic activity began on March 26 with a 5.1 Richter earthquake, while the next day a 5.2 Richter tremor occurred. The seismic tremors continued with smaller magnitudes until May 22. On the evening of that day, an earthquake of magnitude 5.5 Richter occurred, while 24 hours later the main tremor struck.	
1893-04-17	Zakynthos				6.4	IX	From 4,500 buildings of the island, 2,000 were completely destroyed	
1893-02-09	Samothrace	40.59	25.53	1	6.8	IX	10-20 injuries	
1889-10-13/14	Lesbos			36	6.7		200 injuries	
1886-08-27	Filiatra	37.10	21.50	326–600	7.5	X	796 injuries / 6,000 buildings collapsed or severely damaged / 123 villages destroyed/ Tsunami	NGDC,
1881-04-03	Chios, Çeşme, Alaçatı	38.30	26.20	3,550	6.5-7.3	XI	7,000 injured	
1870-08-01	Arachova	38.48	22.55	117	6.8	VIII	380 injured / 2,000 buildings destroyed	
1869-12-16	Lefkada			15	6.4		Only 20-25 houses were saved	
1867-03-07	Lesbos	39.2	26.4	550	6.8-7.0	X	816 injured / 10,275 buildings were damaged	NGDC,
1867-02-04	Lixouri, Cephalonia	38.4	20.2	200–224	7.2	X	2,612 buildings collapsed	NGDC,
1866-01-31	Santorini				6.1	VIII	The volcano of Nea Kameni erupted and began creating two islets	
1865-07-23	Lesbos			10	6.7	IX		,
1861-12-26	Valimitika, Achaea	38.25	22.16	20	6.7	IX	Tsunami wave at the Gulf of Corinth	
1858-02-09	Corinth			21	6.7		65 injuries	
1856-10-12	Rhodes, Crete	35.5	26	538	8.2	XI	638 injuries / 16,512 homes destroyed / tsunami	NGDC,
1853-08-18	Thebes, Greece			13	6.8		Destroyed most of the buildings of city of Thebes	NGDC,
1846-06-11	Messini, Messenia			30	6.5		2,500 buildings destroyed	NGDC,
1840-10-30	Zakynthos	38	21	12		X		NGDC
1837-03-20	Hydra (island), Saronic Gulf			1	6.2 M_{w}	VII		
1829-05-05	Xanthi, Western Thrace	41.1	24.5		7.3 M_{w}	IX	The city of Xanthi was almost destroyed. Drama (X) was almost completely destroyed, as well as many villages in the municipal county.	
1825-01-19	Lefkada				6.5 M_{w}	X		
1817-08-23	Helike				6.6 M_{w}			
1810-02-16	Crete, Heraklion	35.5	25.6	2,000	7.5 M_{w}	X		
1804-06-08	Patras	38.1	21.7	10	6.4 M_{w}	IX		
1752-07-29	East Thrace	41.41	26.61	>100	7.5 M_{w}	VIII	The cities of Havsa (IX) and Haskoy were leveled while Andrianoupolis (Edirne) and other cities of East Thrace suffered great damage.	
1677	Vasilika, Thessaloniki	40.558	23.040		6.2 M_{w}	VIII	Vasilika and several other villages east of Thessaloniki suffered severe damage	
1630-03-09	Crete							
1481-05-03	Rhodes	36.0	28.0	30,000	7.1 M_{s}	X	Tsunami	
1303-08-08	Crete, Alexandria	35.0	27.0	Many thousands	~8	IX	Triggered a major tsunami; severely damaged the Lighthouse of Alexandria	
Dec 856	Corinth	37.9	22.9	45,000				
515	Rhodes						Ambraseys states that the death toll in this nighttime event was high and that the damage was severe	
365-07-21	Crete, Alexandria	35.0	23.0	Many thousands	8.5+		It is considered the largest known earthquake in the Mediterranean. Raised part of Crete 12 metres, causing severe damage and triggering a tsunami that devastated Alexandria. Severe casualties and more than 100 cities in Crete were destroyed.	
226 BC	Rhodes	36.43	28.21				Toppled the Colossus of Rhodes.Thousands homes collapsed.	
426 BC	Skarfeia, Euboic Gulf	38.85	22.78	2,550	7.0	IX	The historian Thucydides concluded that the Malian Gulf tsunami of the same year was caused by the earthquake, the first to recognize such a link	
464 BC	Sparta	37.08	22.43	~20,000	7.2 M_{s}	IX	Death toll to be around 20,000, although the number is disputed. The earthquake gave Spartan helots an opportunity to revolt against their aristocratic rulers.	

== See also ==
- Geology of Greece
