= Crete earthquake =

Crete earthquake may refer to:

- 365 Crete earthquake
- 1303 Crete earthquake
- 1630 Crete earthquake
- 1810 Crete earthquake
- 2021 Crete earthquake (disambiguation)

== See also ==
- 1856 Heraklion earthquake
