= 2021 Crete earthquake =

2021 Crete earthquake may refer to:

- 2021 Arkalochori earthquake
- 2021 Lasithi earthquake

== See also ==
- Crete earthquake (disambiguation)
- 2021 Larissa earthquake
