= 2021 Lasithi earthquake =

Earthquake in Greece

- Location within Greece Location within Mediterranean
- UTC time: 2021-10-12 09:24:03
- ISC event: 621146229
- USGS-ANSS: ComCat
- Local date: 12 October 2021
- Local time: 12:24
- Magnitude: 6.4 M_{w} (USGS); 6.3 M_{w} (ITSAK)
- Depth: 10 km (6.2 mi); 11 km (6.8 mi)
- Epicenter: 35.193°N 26.256°E; 34.96°N 26.38°E
- Type: Normal
- Max. intensity: MMI VIII (Severe)
- Peak acceleration: 0.45 g
- Tsunami: Minor
- Casualties: None

The 2021 Lasithi earthquake was a magnitude 6.4 M_{w} earthquake with a maximum intensity of VIII (Severe) on the Modified Mercalli Intensity Scale which occurred on 12 October 2021, 12:24 (UTC+3:00) off the island of Crete. The quake was also felt at low intensity as far as Cairo and Istanbul.

The quake occurred on the anniversary of the 1856 Heraklion earthquake which killed about 600 people and about two weeks after the 2021 Arkalochori earthquake. Weak tremors were felt in Giza and Cairo, which also coincided with the anniversary of the 1992 Cairo earthquake. The tremor was the largest earthquake in Greece since the 2020 Aegean Sea earthquake.

== Earthquake ==
The quake was recorded as a 6.3 earthquake by the European-Mediterranean Seismological Centre, but was upgraded to 6.4 in magnitude. Efthymios Lekkas, president of the Earthquake Planning and Protection Organisation, said that the quake was not directly related to the first tremor a month ago, but instead was a sign of the activation of the Eastern part of the Hellenic arc. According to a moment tensor solution by the U.S. Geological Survey, the earthquake was associated with shallow normal faulting within the Aegean Sea plate at a depth of 10 km.

Due to the distance between the 6.4 and 6.0 events, spaced far apart, it is not likely they are directedly related. Greek seismologists added that the two earthquakes occurred by chance despite saying that the chances of two large events happening in the same region is low. The lack of aftershocks sparked concern among seismologists due to the lack of aftershocks following the quake. The rate of aftershocks were substantially lower than expected for an earthquake of its size.

== Tectonic setting ==
The island of Crete, and the country of Greece in general is prone to seismic activity and is home to one of the most destructive earthquakes in all of Europe. Crete lies in the non-magmatic part of the so-called Hellenic arc which is related to of the subduction of the African plate beneath the Eurasian plate (specifically the Aegean Sea plate). Crete is affected by large earthquakes originating from or near the subduction zone, such as the 365 Crete earthquake. It is also affected by much shallower earthquakes resulting from ongoing extension orientated north–south (on west–east trending normal faults) and west–east (on south–north to SSW–NNE trending normal faults).

== Damage ==
According to the Mayor of Sitia, the town hall was confirmed to have sustained damage. The church of Saint Nicholas in Xerokampos, Sitia collapsed, but no casualties were reported as the structure was vacant during the time of the shock. Efthymios Lekkas, a professor of dynamic tectonic applied geology and disaster management at the National and Kapodistrian University of Athens said that fortunately damage was minimal and was only observed in old or abandoned masonry buildings. At Xerokampos, the quake lead to the collapse of the chapel of Agios Nicholaos and knocked off items off shelves at shops. The town hall building of Sitia suffered minor fracturing on the facade.

== Tsunami ==
A small tsunami was detected by instruments in the sea, prompting coastal residents to stay away from the sea. OASP President Efthymios Lekkas said in a statement: "We have issued a tsunami alert but nothing alarming. We are talking about 10 kilometers southeast of Zakros. The phenomenon has arrived and may not be visible in some areas. The quake was small to create a large tsunami. Apart from Crete, the whole southern Aegean has been shaken," Geodynamics Institute in Athens director Vassilis Karastathis also said in an interview with popular Greek newspaper Proto Thema saying: "There is always an announcement when there is a strong earthquake in the sea. To understand what happens when we have a strong seismic event at sea because we are dealing with time in relation to the tsunami we do not wait for time to pass and until we see all the data from the warning systems we send the announcement for good and for bad. So depending on some rules of earthquake magnitude and distance from the shores and of course to be in the sea then we issue a warning. So here, since it is not on land and it was at sea, we made the announcement ".

== Response ==
Stavros Arnaoutakis, the Governor of Crete calmed the people, saying "We have to be cool, so far I have no reports of injuries." He also said in an interview with Greek newspaper Proto Thema: "We were rocking for 15 seconds."

The municipality of Malevezi has issued the cancellations of schools and kindergartens. The further inspection of damaged infrastructure and irrigation networks were also observed in the Municipality. The earthquake management team which was already present since September 27 after the initial quake a month earlier was re-implemented as well as the return of the mobilization of the Civil Protection in the municipality.

== See also ==
- 1856 Heraklion earthquake
- 2021 Arkalochori earthquake
- List of earthquakes in 2021
- List of earthquakes in Greece
