= Dale Jackson =

Dale Jackson may refer to:

- E. Dale Jackson (1925–1978), American geologist
- H. Dale Jackson (1930–2003), Baptist minister and ethicist
- Dale Jackson, a character in Waterloo Road
- Dale Jackson (Hollyoaks), a character on the soap opera Hollyoaks
- Dale Jackson, a pilot who set a flight endurance record in 1929
