= 1954 Sofades earthquake =

Earthquake struck Greece in 1954

- Location within Greece
- UTC time: 1954-04-30 13:02:39
- ISC event: 890584
- USGS-ANSS: ComCat
- Local date: 30 April 1954
- Local time: 16:02:39 (UTC+3)
- Magnitude: 6.7−7.0 M_{w}
- Depth: 10.0 km (6.2 mi)
- Epicenter: 39.228°N 22.162°E
- Fault: Leontari-Anavra Fault Zone
- Type: Strike-slip
- Areas affected: Karditsa, Larissa, Trikala, Phthiotis, Magnesia and Evritania Prefectures
- Total damage: $3.15 million (1954 rate)
- Max. intensity: MMI X (Extreme)
- Aftershocks: 5.8 M_{w}
- Casualties: 25+ deaths, 717 injuries

The 1954 Sofades earthquake struck central Greece on 30 April 1954, at 16:02 (UTC+3). It was estimated to be 6.7–7.0 M_{w} and had a maximum Modified Mercalli intensity of X (Extreme). More than 25 people died, 717 were injured and about 28,000 structures were damaged or destroyed.

== Geological setting ==
The location of the areas most affected by this earthquake was situated within the Thessalian Plain, a late Caenozoic extensional basin. The basin is filled with late fluvioterrestrial deposits up to 500 m (1,600 ft) thick. These plains formed from the post-orgenic collapse of the first extensional phase in the Late Miocene–Pliocene. The first trended NE–SW and the second phase trended N–S during the mid-Pleistocene that then activated the E–W and ENE–WSW striking faults in the region. The hills that surround the plains are with Alpine like formations of the Pelagonian, Pindos and Koziakas/Western Greece geotectonic units made up of mostly limestone and undated Molassic sediments.

=== Leontari-Anavra Fault Zone ===
The Leontari-Anavara Fault Zone (LAFZ) is the most active Quaternary fault zone of the Western Thessaly plain region. The fault zone consists of four linked segments; the Kedros, Leontari, Velesiotes and Thaumako; all dipping northward and arranged in an en echelon fashion trending ENE–WSW. These segments are about 5–7 km (3.1–4.3 mi) in length, with a combined length of 25 km (16 mi). Continuing seismic activity along the fault even after the quake has led to the creation of a multiple-scarp footwall morphology, some observed near and on the Enipeas river. It also produced later tremors, one of them being the 2021 Larissa earthquake that led to the death of one person and summoned severe damage to multiple villages and towns. The earthquake was also said to have been part of the episodic pattern of tremors that have been produced in the area over the years. Another example is the 1957 Velestino earthquake which occurred in the same basin but far on the other side of the LAFZ. Despite that it bears similarities and characteristics to the 1954 Sofades event.

The Enipeas, Domokos, Vouzi, Farsala and Narthaki faults constitute an E-W trending fault zone with similar characteristics and kinematics to those of the eastern part. More precisely, a dominant strike-slip striation corresponding to a dextral strike slip motion has been recognized along the fault to be super imposed by two oblique to dip-slip striations corresponding respectively to two normal reactivations.

== Earthquake ==
The earthquake struck at around 16:00 local time, initially reported of having a magnitude of 6.7–6.8, with most sources saying it recorded as 7.0 in magnitude. The maximum Modified Mercalli intensity ranged from intensity IX (Violent) to X (Extreme). The largest possible foreshock that was recorded was an earthquake of 4.6 M_{w}, and the largest aftershock measured 5.8 M_{w}, with an intensity of VI (Strong) according to the United States Geological Survey.

== Impact ==
Damage was observed mostly in the Thessalian Plain, specifically in the prefectures of Karditsa, Larissa, Trikala, Phthiotis, Magnesia and Evritania. The villages of Paschalitsa, Neo Ikonio, Asimochori, Fyllo, Grammatiko and Othomaniko among others suffered severe to complete damage. The villages near the epicenter also suffered major affects such as liquefaction; this was possibly due to the soft sedimentary rocks that comprise the Thessalian plains and the large scale intensities recorded in the regions. Surface ruptures were produced, measuring 5 km (3.1 mi) in length at most, which also interrupted and disrupted a train line connecting villages and to other regions.

Local transport networks were badly affected, with damage to rail and road infrastructure, damage or destroyed.

Overall records say the tremor caused $3.15 or 100 million Francs (1954 rate) in damage. About 28,000 structures and homes sustained damage, 6,599 of which were destroyed, while 22,074 structures were slightly to heavily damaged. 25−31 people died and 717 people were injured.

== See also ==
- 2021 Larissa earthquake
- List of earthquakes in 1954
- List of earthquakes in Greece
- Sofades
