= 1886 Peloponnese earthquake =

Earthquake in Greece

- Location within Greece
- Local date: August 27, 1886
- Local time: 23:27
- Magnitude: 6.8–7.3 M_{w}
- Epicenter: 37.10°N 21.50°E
- Areas affected: Messenia, Kingdom of Greece
- Max. intensity: MMI X (Extreme)
- Tsunami: minor
- Casualties: 326–600 dead

The 1886 Peloponnese earthquake occurred at 23:27 local time (21:32 UTC) on 27 August. It had an estimated magnitude between 6.8 and 7.3 on the moment magnitude scale and a maximum felt intensity of X (Extreme) on the Mercalli intensity scale. It caused extensive damage in Messenia, with the towns of Filiatra and Marathos both severely affected. Between 326 and 600 people were killed. It was felt over a wide area from the Khedivate of Egypt to Malta and possibly as far away as Bern and Marseille.

== Tectonic setting ==
The western side of the Peloponnese lies close to the convergent boundary between the Aegean Sea plate and the African plate. A major NNW-SSE trending thrust fault is mapped off the coast near the location of the 1886 event and displacement on this may have caused the earthquake.

== Earthquake ==
The earthquake occurred at about 23:30 local time, although contemporary reports give a range of times. The shaking lasted for between 40 and 60 seconds.

Intensities of ≥X on the Mercalli scale have been estimated from contemporary reports, with the highest intensity reported from Filiatra and Gargalianoi on the mainland and on the island of Zakynthos.

The aftershock sequence continued for about twelve months with the largest being on 2 March 1887.

A small tsunami was observed along the coast from Filiatra to Pylos with minor inundation. An underwater telegraph cable between Zakynthos and Crete was severed about 47 km south of Zakynthos, suggesting that the tsunami may have been caused by an underwater landslide triggered by the earthquake.

== Flames out to sea ==
Smoke and flames were reported out to sea about half an hour after the earthquake by Captain Aquilina of the La Valette. This matches eyewitness accounts from the mainland of flames seen in the direction of the Strofades. Assuming that both observations were of the same phenomenon, it would be located about 150 km offshore. These observations were initially interpreted as a volcanic eruption, but the lack of any known previous activity combined with its location in the Mediterranean Ridge accretionary complex mean that this explanation is considered unlikely. The accretionary complex is known to have many mud volcanoes and the most likely cause of the flames is the spontaneous ignition of methane escaping from a mud volcano triggered by the earthquake.

== Damage ==
Severe damage was widespread throughout Messenia, with the towns of Filiatra, Koroni and Ligudista completely destroyed and Gargalianoi, Kyparissia and Messini badly affected. A further 160 villages were either destroyed or severely damaged. Six other towns and 65 villages suffered significant damage. About 6,000 homes were so damaged as to be unusable and 50,000 inhabitants were left homeless. Several bridges were either damaged or destroyed and a 3 km length of train track was damaged near Pyrgos.

The number of reported casualties varies widely, from 326 dead and 796 injured, 370 dead and 500+ injured, to 600 dead and an unknown number injured.
