= E. Dale Jackson =

American geologist (1925–1978)

Everett Dale Jackson
- Dale Jackson (right) with astronauts C.C. Williams, Frank Borman and Gene Cernan at Sunset Crater on April 30, 1964
- Born: November 29, 1925; Fresno, California, U.S.
- Died: July 28, 1978 (aged 52)
- Education: University of California, Los Angeles (B.S. 1950, Ph.D. 1960)
- Awards: NASA Exceptional Scientific Achievement Medal
- Scientific career
- Fields: Geology
- Workplaces: United States Geological Survey; NASA
- Thesis: Primary textures and mineral associations in the ultramafic zone of the Stillwater complex, Montana (1960)

Everett Dale Jackson (November 29, 1925 – July 28, 1978) was an American geologist. A graduate of the University of California, Los Angeles, where he earned his doctorate in 1960, he was involved with the geological training of astronauts, the planning and preparation of lunar exploration missions, and the dissemination of their discoveries. As co-chief scientist of the Deep Sea Drilling Project (DSDP) leg 55 that drilled the Hawaiian-Emperor seamount chain in 1977, he found the Hawaiian hotspot theory of its formation to be valid.

== Early life ==
Everett Dale Jackson was born in Fresno, California, on November 29, 1925. He joined the United States Marine Corps in 1943 and served in the Pacific Theater of World War II for three years. In 1947, Jackson entered the University of California, Los Angeles. Initially uncertain as to what he would major in, he found geology, discovered that he enjoyed it, and graduated magna cum laude in 1950. After graduation, he married Josephine Arburua. They had a son and twin daughters, all of whom later pursued careers in science.

Jackson joined the United States Geological Survey (USGS) and was assigned to the mapping of the Stillwater igneous complex in Montana. He was tasked with determining whether stratigraphy in the layered rocks of the complex could be used to guide exploration for chromite. This work formed the basis of his Ph.D. thesis in 1960, on Primary textures and mineral associations in the ultramafic zone of the Stillwater complex, Montana, which was published by the USGS as Professional Paper 358. In this work he developed concepts such as the stratigraphic cycles that are used in igneous petrology. His observations led to new discoveries in the geology of Greece.

== Space exploration ==
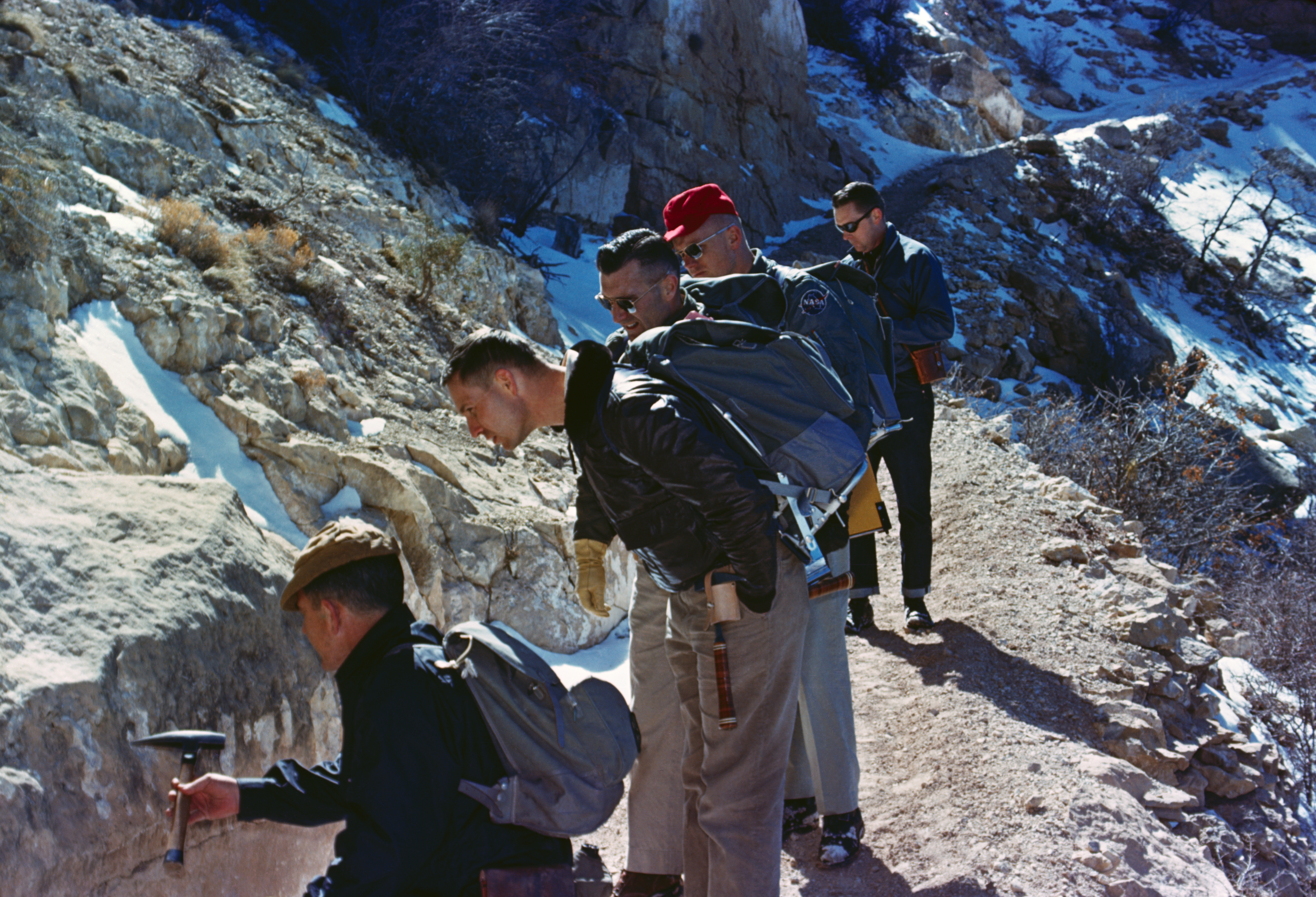
Jackson (left), with astronauts (left to right) Bill Anders, Richard Gordon, Neil Armstrong and Donn Eisele during geological training in the Grand Canyon, Arizona, on March 5, 1964. Groups of three or four astronauts walked down the South Kaibab Trail accompanied by a geologist who described and discussed the geologic features, history, rock types and processes.

In 1962, Jackson was assigned to administrative duties in Washington, D.C., work he did not enjoy so much. In July of following year, at the request of Eugene Shoemaker, he was assigned to the National Aeronautics and Space Administration (NASA) Manned Spacecraft Center in Houston, Texas, where his task was to "provide capable leadership in planning a comprehensive program to establish at Houston a fully equipped facility for the distribution, control, and analysis of lunar and other space samples obtained by flights of manned and unmanned spacecraft."

An agreement was reached between Jackson and Wally Schirra, who was in charge of astronaut training, for coursework to commence when the NASA Astronaut Group 3 arrived in February 1964. This provided Jackson with several months in which to develop a comprehensive training syllabus for the Project Apollo astronauts. He was warned that they were ambivalent if not hostile to training in geology, as they were preoccupied with other matters, but Jackson managed to win them over, communicating with them about geology in a way that they found both interesting and engaging. He was less successful in his relations with the NASA training staff, and left after only one year.

The study of the geology of the Moon proved too interesting to resist, though, and he later became a member of the teams that examined the samples brought back by Apollo 11, 12 and 14. He then became a member of the scientific advisory team for Apollo 15, 16 and 17. As such, he had an important role in planning and conducting the astronauts' geological training, in selecting the landing sites for the missions, in planning their scientific activities, and disseminating their discoveries to the scientific community and the general public. During the missions, he provided advice to the astronauts from the Mission Control Center in Houston that allowed them to return with better samples. Afterwards, he directed teams of scientists in producing coherent reports on the missions. For his contributions, he was awarded the NASA Exceptional Scientific Achievement Medal in 1973.

== Petrology ==
After leaving NASA in 1964, Jackson went to Hawaii, where he studied the oceanic crust and mantle under the island chain. In an effort to explain the effects of basaltic magma that he saw around him, Jackson resorted to experiment with Jello. He led the effort to verify the theory proposed by John Tuzo Wilson and W. Jason Morgan that the volcanoes of the Hawaiian–Emperor seamount chain were formed by the movement of the Pacific plate over the Hawaii hotspot. To test their theory, he became the co-chief scientist of the Deep Sea Drilling Project (DSDP) leg 33, which drilled the Line Islands chain in 1973. A proposal to drill the Hawaiian-Emperor chain was rejected in 1971, but Jackson did not give up, and managed to get the decision reversed in 1975. He became co-chief scientist of DSDP Leg 55 in August 1977, and the results of the expedition proved the theory to be valid.

Jackson was a visiting professor at the University of California, Santa Barbara, in 1967 and Princeton University in 1976. He edited the Journal of Petrology from 1969 to 1973, and remained a member of its advisory board until his death. He was a fellow of the American Geophysical Union, the Mineralogical Society of America and the Geological Society of America.

== Death ==
Jackson died from cancer on July 28, 1978. His papers are held by the Smithsonian Institution's National Museum of Natural History Department of Mineral Sciences.
