= 1856 Heraklion earthquake =

Earthquake affecting the Ottoman Empire (present-day Crete, Greece)

- Location within Greece Location within Mediterranean
- UTC time: 1856-10-12 00:45
- Local date: 11–12 October 1856
- Local time: 02:38 am or 02:45 am EET
- Duration: 2 minutes
- Magnitude: 7.7–8.3 M_{w}
- Depth: 61–100 km
- Epicenter: 35.5°N 26.0°E
- Type: Intraplate
- Areas affected: Mediterranean Sea: Greece; Malta; Sicily; Anatolia; Cyprus; Egypt; Palestine
- Max. intensity: MMI XI (Extreme)–MMI XII (Extreme)
- Tsunami: Unlikely
- Aftershocks: Yes
- Casualties: 600+ dead 600+ injured

The 1856 Heraklion earthquake, also known as the Crete earthquake or Rhodes earthquake, occurred on the morning of October 12 at 02:45 am local time. This extremely catastrophic earthquake had an estimated magnitude of 7.7 to 8.3 at a depth of approximately 61 to 100 km. The earthquake was felt over a very wide area extending from Sicily, Italy to the Levant and North Africa. On the Greek island of Crete, the effects of the earthquake were cataclysmic, over 500 bodies were recovered in the city of Heraklion. Shockwaves from the earthquake were felt intensely, covering all of the Ottoman Empire; present-day Turkey, Cyprus and the Middle East where damage and human losses were reported. In Malta, the Għajn Ħadid Tower—a coastal watchtower built around the year 1638—was severely damaged in the earthquake, when its upper floor collapsed. In Cairo, Egypt, the earthquake destroyed buildings, created seiches in canals, and killed several people. Off the Egyptian and Italian coasts, sailors reported feeling a seaquake.

== Tectonic background ==
Along the southern coast of the Dodecanese Islands, Rhodes, Crete and the Ionian Islands, the African plate made of oceanic crust is subducting beneath the Aegean Sea plate (part of the Eurasian plate) along a convergent plate boundary at a rate of 5 to 10 mm/yr. The interface of the subduction zone occasionally ruptures in large megathrust earthquakes such as those in 365 and 1303. Tsunamis are produced along the Hellenic Trench as one side of the fault is suddenly thrust upwards, displacing trillions of liters of seawater during a massive earthquake.

== Earthquake ==
The Heraklion earthquake of 1856 was an intermediate-depth earthquake with a hypocenter depth of 60 to 90 km, occurring on a fault within the subducting African plate. The epicenter is most likely located off the northern coast of Crete, based on evaluating where the strongest isoseismic contours were. For a moment magnitude 7.7 (M_{w}) event, the estimated fault dimensions is 64 km × 64 km at a depth of 90 km beneath the Aegean Sea while an 8.1–8.3 M_{w}would involve a 120 km × 120 km fault rupture at a deeper depth of 130 km.

== Effects ==
The earthquake caused widespread damage not just in Greece, but in the Middle East and North Africa, where additional deaths and damage was reported. An exact time of occurrence is still debated between 02:38 am or 02:45 am.

=== Greece ===
The earthquake reached XI (Extreme) on the Mercalli intensity scale in the central part of Crete. The city of Heraklion was almost destroyed, with only 18 or 40 of the 3,600 houses left standing. The seaside cities of Sitia and Chania were also severely damaged. A total of 538 inhabitants of Crete were killed while 637 persons were injured. On the island of Rhodes, several villages were destroyed and the coast experienced uplift. Ground failures were widely observed amidst the destruction. Sixty people died on the island. The island of Thera also reported some damage. In Kasos and Karpathos, 8,000 homes were wiped-out, and there were 20 deaths.

On mainland Greece, the earthquake was felt in the cities of Ioannina and Kyparissia.

=== Malta ===
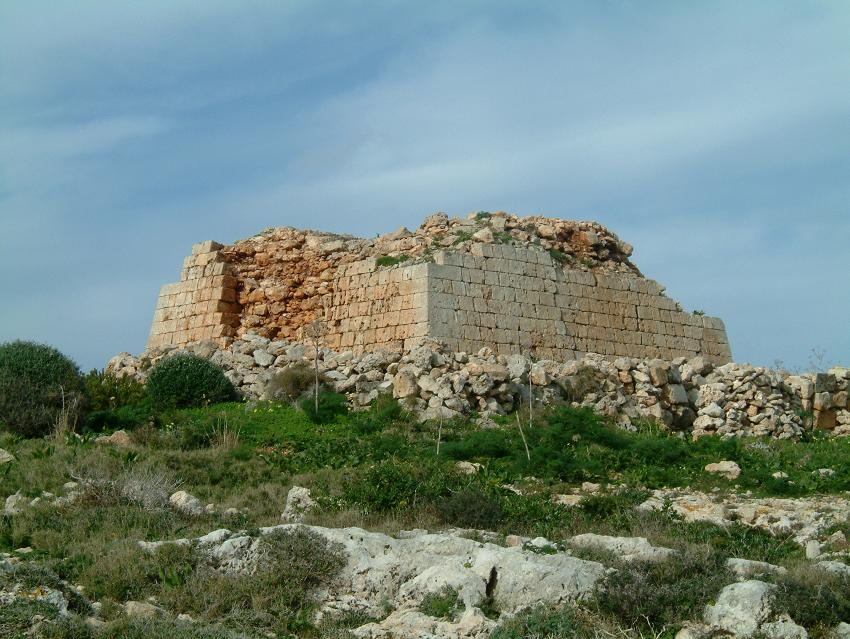
Ruins of the Għajn Ħadid Tower after the earthquake.

In the Maltese Islands, the earthquake was felt much stronger than most earthquakes from Greece when felt on the islands, making this very unusual and of interest to many seismologists. The quake disrupted the night and woke everyone on the island. The shaking lasted between 22 and 60 seconds, causing many residents to lose their balance and threw down many items in houses. Large cracks developed in the homes of some places such as Valletta and Gozo Region. Many churches had cracks in the walls and domes and had hanging crucifixes falling off. In some cases, the damage was more serious, some churches experiencing a total collapse. The dome of Saint Paul's Cathedral in Mdina collapsed from the inside, which caused some £1,000 in damage. Another church, the Carmelite Church, had its steeple rebuilt because the earthquake had damaged it so severely.

Damage to structures corresponded to intensity VII, higher than expected for the 1,000 km distance from the earthquake in Greece. A typical earthquake should only be felt with intensities IV–V. The occurrence of very strong shaking is likely attributed to long period ground motion.

It was this earthquake that collapsed the Għajn Ħadid Tower. An eyewitness present at the tower one month before the earthquake said large cracks opened in the ground around the tower.

=== Egypt ===
In Cairo, the shaking was still perceivable and strong enough to cause damage. Shaking intensity in the Egyptian capital reached VII–VIII. Three distinct shocks were felt with durations between one and two minutes. Twenty homes collapsed and another 200 were affected, while some 20 mosques were also crippled. Seiches in canals caused water to splash all over while clocks stopped working as a result of the ground motions. At least ten people died in the city. Following the aftermath, many survivors slept outside their homes for fear of a collapse during the night for several days.

In Alexandria, only some old construction fell but there were no major implications to the city. Two people were killed and some injuries were sustained to people. Around the Nile Delta, collapses of homes and falling minarets killed an additional number of people in the towns of Tanta and Damanhur. In other parts of the delta, many residents found it difficult to stand, which terrified many. Ground motions were strong enough to shift furniture and cause water in tanks to slosh around. Sailors off the coasts reported feeling the strong earthquake as well.

=== Elsewhere ===
Shaking was also felt in Syracuse and Pozzallo, Sicily, Italy where some minor damage occurred. The shock also caused damage to places like Syria and Palestine. Eyewitnesses along the coasts of Haifa and Lebanon reported a small "tsunami" wave. Effects from the earthquake was felt in the entire Adriatic Sea region and Cyprus.

== Legacy ==
In the book Domestic Life in Palestine, author Mary Eliza Rogers described her experience of the strong tremors in Haifa, Israel but she dated the event incorrectly between the night of 10 and 11 October.

== See also ==
- List of earthquakes in Greece
- List of earthquakes in Turkey
- List of earthquakes in Egypt
- Seismic risk in Malta
