= 1810 Crete earthquake =

Magnitude 7 eastern Mediterranean earthquake

- Location within Greece
- Local date: 16 February 1810
- Local time: 19:00
- Magnitude: 7.5 M_{w}
- Depth: 90 km
- Epicenter: 35.5°N 25.6°E
- Areas affected: Greece, Crete, Heraklion
- Max. intensity: MMI IX (Violent)
- Tsunami: minor
- Casualties: 300 fatalities

The 1810 Crete earthquake occurred at 22:15 on 16 February. It caused great destruction in Heraklion and some damage from Malta to northern Egypt, and was felt from central Italy to Syria. 300 fatalities were reported from Candia (Heraklion).

== Tectonic setting ==
The Hellenic arc is an arcuate tectonic feature related to the subduction of the African plate beneath the Aegean Sea plate. It is one of the most active seismic zones in western Eurasia and has a history of large earthquakes that also affect Egypt. Large earthquakes with epicentres near Crete and to the north of the island are typically intermediate depth events located at the subducting plate interface. Such events are often M>7, but due to their depths cause relatively little damage for their size, while being very widely felt.

== Damage ==
The earthquake caused severe damage in Heraklion and northeastern Crete. Damage was also reported from islands in the south Aegean, Cairo, Rosetta, Alexandria in northern Egypt and on Malta. Reports of the collapse of part of the Temple of Amon at Siwa Oasis in 1811 have also been attributed to the 1810 event, rather than a separate earthquake, which is now regarded as a 'spurious event'.

== Characteristics ==
The earthquake was widely felt, and recorded from as far away as Cyprus, Turkey, Syria, central Italy and various parts of North Africa. The main shock is reported to have lasted for two minutes in Malta.

There are reports of a tsunami, with waves being recorded in the harbours of Malta and Alexandria and nearby canals, although these have more the character of seiches.

== See also ==
- List of earthquakes in Greece
- List of historical earthquakes
