= 1303 Crete earthquake =

Earthquake (8 August 1303)

- Location within Greece
- Local date: 8 August 1303
- Local time: At about dawn
- Magnitude: 8.0 (est.)
- Epicenter: 35.0°N 27.0°E
- Areas affected: Greece, Rhodes, Egypt
- Max. intensity: MMI IX (Violent)
- Tsunami: Yes
- Casualties: Many thousands, including about 4,000 in Crete

The 1303 Crete earthquake occurred at about dawn on 8 August. It had an estimated magnitude of about 8, a maximum intensity of IX (Violent) on the Mercalli intensity scale, and triggered a major tsunami that caused severe damage and loss of life on Crete and at Alexandria. It badly damaged the Lighthouse of Alexandria.

== Tectonic setting ==
The Hellenic arc, the most likely location for this earthquake, is an arcuate tectonic feature related to the subduction of the African plate beneath the Aegean Sea plate. It is one of the most active seismic zones in western Eurasia and has a history of large earthquakes that also affect Egypt.

== Damage ==
The earthquake and the tsunami are recorded as having a devastating impact on Heraklion, Crete. Detailed information is available from reports made by representatives from Heraklion (then Candia) to the controlling Venetian administration, written on the day of the earthquake and twenty days later. They describe the extent of damage to the main public buildings of Candia and castles over the whole island.

The reports mention that most of the victims were women and children, without giving numbers. There was massive flooding at Alexandria. Many ships were destroyed, some of them carried up to 2 miles (3.2 km) inland. The port city of Acre, on the Levantine coast, was also affected. Buildings were destroyed and people swept to their deaths.

In Egypt the earthquake caused severe damage in Cairo, dislodging much of the Great Pyramid's white limestone casing and toppling minarets on many mosques. In Alexandria the city walls were mostly destroyed. Most notably, the Lighthouse of Alexandria, one of the seven Wonders of the World, was badly damaged. Homes in Alexandria collapsed, killing many people. According to Alexis Perrey, the earthquake was felt on the entire Adriatic coast, up to Venice (about 1,600 km or 1,000 mi from Heraklion).

== Characteristics ==
=== Earthquake ===
Although the precise location of the epicenter is uncertain, it is generally agreed that the earthquake ruptured the eastern segment of the Hellenic arc somewhere between Crete and Rhodes. The earthquake caused damage over a wide area including Crete, the Peloponnese, Rhodes, Cairo, Acre, Damascus, Antioch, and Cyprus and was felt as far away as Constantinople (1,000 km; 620 mi) and possibly Tunis (1,500 km; 930 mi). The exact magnitude is unknown but is estimated to have been about 8.0.

=== Tsunami ===
Modeling of the tsunami predicts a maximum 9-metre (30 ft) run-up at Alexandria, with about a 40-minute delay from the time of the earthquake to the arrival of the first wave in Egypt.

== See also ==
- 365 Crete earthquake
- List of earthquakes in Greece
- List of historical earthquakes
- List of tsunamis
