= Alexis Perrey =

French seismologist (1807–1882)

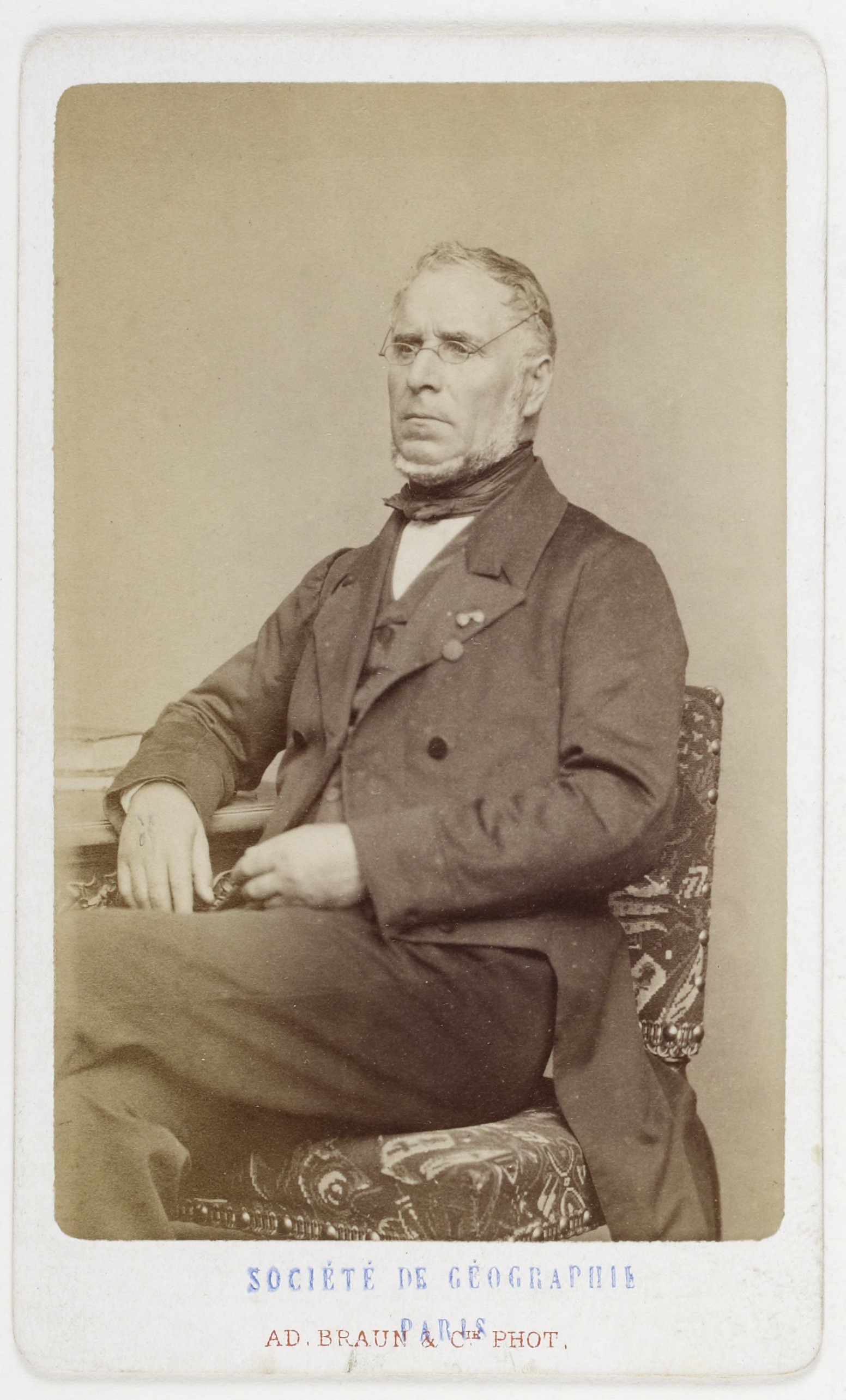

Alexis Perrey (1807–1882) was a historical French seismologist and compiler of earthquake catalogs. He is considered a pioneer in this area, having published a paper on earthquakes in Algeria as early as 1848, in the journal Mémoires de l'Académie des Sciences, Arts et Belles-Lettres de Dijon. He continued to post annual observations on Algerian earthquakes until 1871.

He suspected a correlation between the Moon and seismic activity on Earth, and developed his theory with the use of statistics. He found that Earth tremors occurred most frequently during full and new moons, when the Earth is between the Sun and Moon, when the Moon is between the Earth and Sun, and when the Moon is closest in its orbit to the Earth. He also found indications in some cases that the Moon had crossed the meridian of affected locales at the time of the earthquake.
