= 2021 Larissa earthquake =

Earthquake in Greece

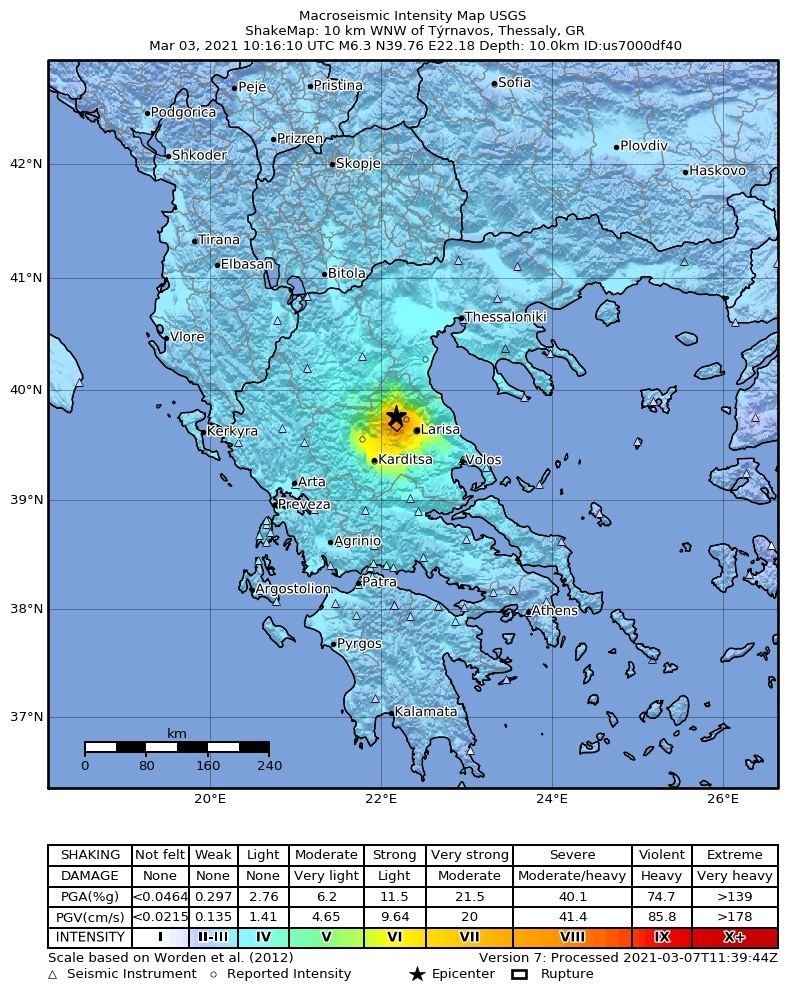

- Location within Greece
- UTC time: 2021-03-03 10:16:09
- ISC event: 619907234
- USGS-ANSS: ComCat
- Local date: March 3, 2021
- Local time: 12:16:09 EET
- Magnitude: 6.3 M_{w}
- Depth: 8.0 km (5.0 mi)
- Epicenter: 39.675°N 22.876°E
- Areas affected: Greece, Albania, Kosovo, Montenegro, North Macedonia
- Max. intensity: MMI VIII (Severe)
- Landslides: Yes
- Aftershocks: 5.8 M_{w}
- Casualties: 1 dead, 11 injured

On March 3, 2021, 12:16:09 (UTC +2) the 2021 Larissa earthquake had a magnitude of 6.3 M_{w} with an intensity of VIII (Severe) on the Mercalli Scale 9 kilometers west of Týrnavos, Greece. One person was confirmed dead with eleven other people injured. Light shaking was also felt as far as Albania, North Macedonia, Kosovo and Montenegro.

== Earthquake ==
Modified Mercalli intensities in selected locations
MMI	Locations	Population exposure
MMI VIII (Severe)	Mesochori	1,000
MMI VII (Very strong)	Larissa	124,000
MMI VI (Strong)	Trikala	142,000
MMI V (Moderate)	Karditsa	175,000
MMI IV (Light)	Patras	1.08 million

The earthquake was recorded as a magnitude 6.3 earthquake by the United States Geological Survey, while the Institute of Geodynamics in Athens recorded it as a magnitude 6.0 earthquake.

Seismological events are quite common in Greece. In 2020 a 7.0 earthquake rattled the Aegean Sea killing at least 119 people (Two in Greece). In 1999 an earthquake occurred near the capital Athens, killing more than 100 people.

== Aftershocks ==
There were numerous aftershocks following the mainshock, the strongest of which was a magnitude 5.8 that occurred 11 km East of Verdikoussa that further worsened already severely damaged houses and other infrastructure.

== Casualties ==
There were numerous reports of damage mostly along Central Greece including old churches and infrastructure, several buildings and houses, one of them was a primary school built in 1938 as well as 63 students that were attending classes in the village of Damasi. There were also power interruptions in the City of Volos and the entire Magnesia Prefecture and travel disruptions between numerous towns due to landslides.

The body of an elderly man was found under the rubble of his own home by rescue teams, and eleven other people sustained injuries.

== See also ==
- List of earthquakes in 2021
- List of earthquakes in Greece
- 2020 Aegean Sea earthquake
- 1999 Athens earthquake
- 2021 Crete earthquake
- 1954 Sofades earthquake
