= Geology of Greece =

The geology of Greece is highly structurally complex due to its position at the junction between the European and African tectonic plates.

== Geologic history, stratigraphy and tectonics ==
Some of the oldest rocks in Greece are from the Paleozoic and are usually metamorphosed with no fossils. The Rhodope Massif spans the northern mainland, divided into amphibolite schist and gneiss, with comparatively recent granite intrusions from the Oligocene and Miocene. West of the Strymonas River is the Serbo-Macedonian Massif, covering the Chalkidiki Peninsula with thick marble and gneiss, with granite intrusions.

=== Alpine cycle ===
Alpine cycle sedimentary rocks are situated between the European hinterland in the Rhodope Massif and Serbo-Macedonian Massif and northern fore-region of the African plate. External zones include the Paxi Zone, encompassing the islands in the Ionian Sea with dolomitized limestone from the Jurassic and Cretaceous-Miocene marl and gypsum. The Ionian Zone spans much of western Greece with Triassic evaporites overlain by Jurassic neritic limestones. During the Toarcian, extensive block faulting differentiated the Ionian Basin. Extensional faults were reactivated during the Eocene Alpine orogeny. The Ionian Zone is thrust westward over the Preapulian Zone and overlain by molasse facies.

The Gavrovo-Tripolis Zone underlies Crete, the Dodecanese islands and much of the western mainland. Bauxites indicate a dry time in the Eocene and Oligocene flysch unconformably overlies older carbonates. The Peloponnesus and Crete regions of the zone are overthrust on the Plattenkalk unit. Normal faults with four kilometers of displacement are not uncommon although folding is limited—tectonic activity picked up in the Oligocene.

Additionally, the Olonos-Pindus Zone extends from Montenegro to Rhodes and is a deep allochthon trough, with clastic Triassic sandstone and the Drymos Limestone.

=== Internal zones ===
Internal zones span between the Serbo-Macedonian Massif and external zones:

- Pelagonian Zone: This zone includes metamorphosed rocks in Western Macedonia, Thessaly, Attica and Cyclades with an overlying Paleozoic and Mesozoic nappe. The schist-sandstone, Permian limestone, brecciated limestone and Triassic dolomite of its component unit—the Malliakos Series—has been used to infer the extension of the Olonos-Pindus Zone.
- Zone of Eastern Greece: Parts of the Pelagonian Zone are covered by Cretaceous metamorphosed rocks. Paleozoic rocks include conglomerate, sandstone, siltstone, tuff and limestone. Carbonate nerite deposited in the Triassic, together with bauxite and an ophiolite nappe was thrust to the west. Cretaceous limestones are the top unit, the Zone of Eastern Greece is overthrust onto external zones (which appear as tectonic windows).

=== Axios Zone ===
The Axios Zone, also known as the Vardar Zone, represents the closing of the Axios Ocean and separates the Pelagonian zone from the Serbo-Macedonian Massif. Clastic sediments from the Paleozoic and Mesozoic ophiolites and sediments are common. Geologists subdivide it into the calc-schists, granite, diabase, chert and ophiolite of the Paeonias subzone and the acidic volcanic rocks and limestone of the Triassic-Jurassic Paikon subzone (an old island arc). The silicified ophiolites of the Almopias subzone, bordering the Pelagonian zone to the northeast represents an old ocean trench.

=== Cenozoic (66 million years ago-present) ===
Neogene sediment deposited after the Alpine cycle outcrops widely. The Mesohellene Trough, Epirus-Akarnania basin and Cycladic Basin are all examples of molasse basins from the early Miocene. The Ionian Islands basin is part of the Preapulian Zone and may only have had an interruption in sedimentation in the late Miocene into the Pliocene. Most sediments in other Neogene basins are marine, but the Aegean Islands basin is filled with continental sediments. As the molasse basins filled during Burdigalian and Langhian times, the uplift of the Pindus Cordillera caused nappe formations to slide onto metamorphic rocks of the Cyclades. In the Tortonian, arc fracturing brought subsidence of the Cretan Basin. Inland basins preserved numerous mammal fossils such as the Pikermi site north of Athens in continental clay.

Volcanic activity in the Aegean began in the Neogene and Quaternary. Volcanoes in western Thrace, Limnos and Samothrace are on the edge of the Rhodope Massif, while the Aegean volcanic arc borders the Menderes Massif and Attico-Cycladic Massif. The Neogene Santorini volcanoes erupted in the Holocene, destroying the Mycenaean civilization. Interior basins hold thick lakebed sediments from the Quaternary, indicating oscillation between cold desert conditions and wet interglacials. Travertine springs often preserve more recent fossil assemblages. Near Corinth, brackish Black Sea water invaded during the Middle Pleistocene, although for the most part, the islands and water area of the Aegean did not change the during the ice ages.

== Natural resource geology ==
- Asbestos: Occurs in joints in Western Macedonia and in the serpentinized edge of the Vourinos Massif
- Antimony: Stibnite is found in Thrace and Macedonia, as well as in Devonian argillite veins on Chios island
- Barite: Common in hydrothermal deposits and widely exported from the island of Mykonos for oil drilling. Also found on Kos and Polyvos with total reserves of several million tons.
- Bauxite: Greece has over 1000 deposits particularly in the east-central part of the country, typically between limestone formations.
- Bentonite: Several million tons of calcium-type bentonite is found on Kimolos and Milos and is often converted for higher swelling capacity by treating with sodium carbonate. Greece is the second largest bentonite producer after the United States.
- Chromite: Hosted in peridotite, ophiolites and dunite. Near Vourinos is a deposit with 1.5 million tons of ore and an ancient mine in Thessalia extracted 500,000 tons by the 1990s.
- Copper: The Chalkidiki Peninsula has 15 million tons of copper. Pyrite is common near East Peloponesus and disseminated copper sulfides are common in veins in Western Macedonia.
- Iron: Greece has 200 small "soft" iron deposits and iron-nickel laterite 130 kilometers north of Athens with 200 million tons of ore
- Lignite: Greece has one of the most prominent sources for Lignite and is one of Greece's primary sources of fuel consuming around 14.3 million tons per year

=== Hydrocarbon ===
Herodotus recognized a bitumen well at Limin Keri on the southern end of Zakynthos Island. Onshore oil exploration began in 1938 and moved offshore in 1970. The Prinos Anticline offshore was found to contain oil under Miocene rocks.
