= Aegean Sea plate =

Small tectonic plate in the eastern Mediterranean Sea

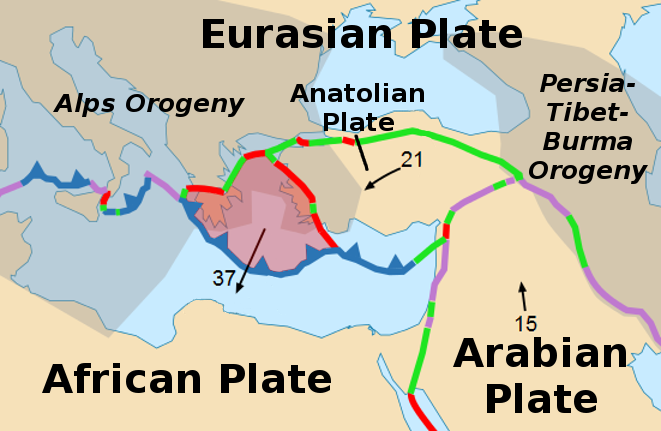
- Type: Micro
- Movement^{1}: south-west
- Speed^{1}: 37 mm/year
- Features: Greece, Turkey, Aegean Sea
- ^{1}Relative to the African plate

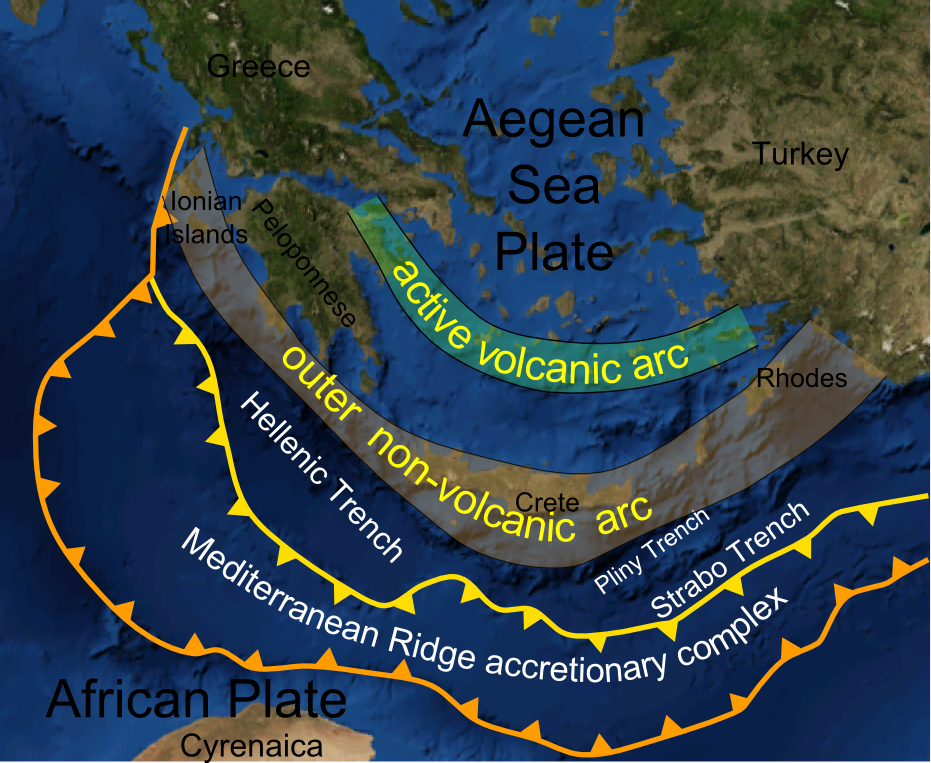

The Aegean Sea plate (also called the Hellenic plate or Aegean plate) is a small tectonic plate located in the Eastern Mediterranean under Southern Greece and western Turkey. Its southern edge is the Hellenic subduction zone south of Crete, where the African plate is being swept under the Aegean Sea plate. Its northern margin is a divergent boundary with the Eurasian plate.

The seafloor in this region is about 350 m below sea level, while the adjacent Black Sea and Mediterranean Sea are 1300–1500 m deep. For this reason it is considered a high plateau between the seas. Evidence suggests the Aegean plate contains thinned continental crust, rather than oceanic crust. Since its creation the crust has been thinned through various processes, including post-orogenic collapse and crustal extension. This extension is responsible for the formation of the Gulf of Corinth.

Previous observations of the region's motion described the crust under the Aegean Sea as a part of the Anatolian plate, and the different directions of motion were explained as the plate rotating counterclockwise. Further measurements found that motion of the Aegean region differed from the previous model, so the two plates are now considered distinct from each other.

== Development ==
The Aegean Sea area is thought to be an actively extending back-arc region due to slab rollback on the Hellenic subduction zone. This has resulted in extensive normal faulting and rifting, as well as the formation of a back-arc basin. This environment has created a number of horst and graben features on the seafloor, similar to basin and range topography. Many of the Aegean Islands are peaks from these features reaching above sea level. The southern part of the plate is 20–22 km thick, while the northern part of the plate is 32–40 km thick, which suggests that the extensional environment has only recently begun affecting the northern region.

Prior to the extensional environment, the region underwent the Aegean Orogeny (c. 70–14 Ma), followed by crustal thinning due to post-orogenic collapse. This period enabled metamorphism and then exhumation of many types of metamorphic rock found on the Aegean islands.

== Seismic activity ==
The Aegean Sea and surrounding area is seismically active because of the Hellenic subduction zone, as well as the extension of the Aegean Plate. The African plate is subducting under the Aegean plate at a rate of about 40 mm/year, causing shallow earthquakes near the fault and deeper earthquakes near the Greek volcanic arc. Some seismic activity is a result of the extension of the plate, which creates east–west trending faults that can slip and cause earthquakes.
