= Joni Mitchell discography =

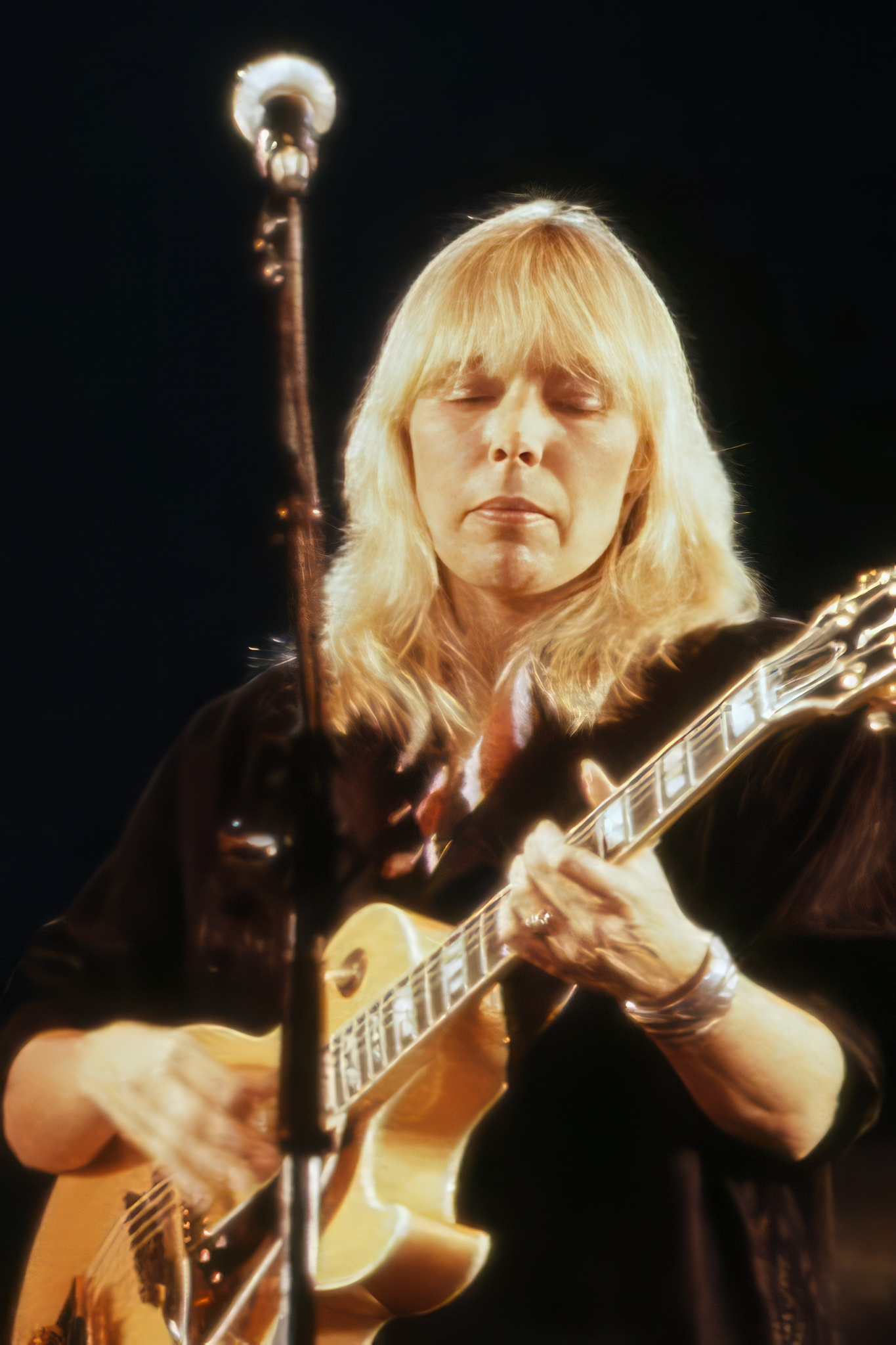
- Mitchell performing in concert in 1983
- Studio albums: 19
- Extended plays: 1
- Live albums: 6
- Compilation albums: 19
- Tribute albums: 2
- Singles: 33
- Video albums: 8
- Music videos: 30

Since her debut album in 1968, Canadian musician Joni Mitchell has released 19 studio albums, most recently 2007's Shine. Her most commercially successful period was the early-mid 1970s, which included 1970's Ladies of the Canyon, 1971's Blue and 1974's Court and Spark, all three of which reached Platinum status in the US.

In the United States alone, Mitchell has accrued record sales of 7 million certified by the RIAA. In the UK, she has certified sales in excess of 1.3 million copies.

== Albums ==
=== Studio albums ===
Title	Album details	Peak chart positions							Certifications
Title	Album details	CAN	AUS	NOR	NZ	SWE	UK	US	Certifications
Song to a Seagull	Released: March 23, 1968; Label: Reprise	—	—	—	—	—	—	189	
Clouds	Released: May 1, 1969; Label: Reprise	22	—	—	—	—	—	31	BPI: Gold; RIAA: Gold
Ladies of the Canyon	Released: April 1970; Label: Reprise	16	32	—	—	—	8	27	BPI: Gold; RIAA: Platinum
Blue	Released: June 22, 1971; Label: Reprise	9	—	24	—	—	3	15	ARIA: Gold; BPI: 2× Platinum; RIAA: Platinum
For the Roses	Released: November 1972; Label: Asylum	5	19	—	—	—	—	11	BPI: Silver; RIAA: Gold
Court and Spark	Released: January 17, 1974; Label: Asylum	1	34	18	—	—	14	2	BPI: Gold; RIAA: 2× Platinum
The Hissing of Summer Lawns	Released: November 1975; Label: Asylum	7	62	—	—	—	14	4	BPI: Silver; RIAA: Gold
Hejira	Released: November 22, 1976; Label: Asylum	22	38	—	—	—	11	13	ARIA: Gold; BPI: Silver; RIAA: Gold
Don Juan's Reckless Daughter	Released: December 13, 1977; Label: Asylum	28	39	—	—	—	20	25	BPI: Silver; RIAA: Gold
Mingus	Released: June 13, 1979; Label: Asylum	37	44	—	27	48	24	17	BPI: Silver
Wild Things Run Fast	Released: October 1982; Label: Geffen	33	51	14	10	50	32	25	
Dog Eat Dog	Released: October 1985; Label: Geffen	44	86	—	30	27	57	63	
Chalk Mark in a Rain Storm	Released: March 23, 1988; Label: Geffen	23	44	—	18	37	26	45	MC: Gold
Night Ride Home	Released: February 18, 1991; Label: Geffen	30	55	—	40	43	25	41	
Turbulent Indigo	Released: October 25, 1994; Label: Reprise	24	—	—	—	—	53	47	MC: Gold
Taming the Tiger	Released: September 29, 1998; Label: Reprise	86	—	25	—	—	57	75	
Both Sides Now	Released: March 20, 2000; Label: Reprise	19	—	20	—	—	50	66	BPI: Gold
Travelogue	Released: November 19, 2002; Label: Nonesuch	—	—	—	—	—	—	—	
Shine	Released: September 25, 2007; Label: Hear Music	13	71	10	—	25	36	14	
"—" denotes a recording that did not chart or was not released in that territory.

=== Live albums ===
Title	Album details	Peak chart positions						Certifications
Title	Album details	CAN	AUS	NOR	NZ	UK	US	Certifications
Miles of Aisles	Released: November 1974; Label: Asylum	13	46	—	—	34	2	RIAA: Gold
Shadows and Light	Released: September 1980; Label: Asylum	73	70	45	20	63	38	
Amchitka – October 16, 1970 (with James Taylor and Phil Ochs)	Released: November 2009; Label: Greenpeace	—	—	—	—	—	—	
Live at Canterbury House – 1967	Released: October 2020; Label: Rhino (3LP)	—	—	—	—	—	—	
Live at Carnegie Hall – 1969	Released: November 2021; Label: Rhino (3LP)	—	—	—	—	—	—	
Joni Mitchell at Newport	Released: July 28, 2023; Label: Rhino	—	—	—	—	52	167	
"—" denotes a recording that did not chart or was not released in that territory.

=== Compilation albums ===
Title	Album details	Peak chart positions		Certifications
Title	Album details	UK	US	Certifications
The World of Joni Mitchell	Released: 1971; Label: Reprise	—	—	
Hits	Released: October 29, 1996; Label: Reprise	—	161	ARIA: Platinum; BPI: Gold
Misses	Released: October 29, 1996; Label: Reprise	—	—	
The Complete Geffen Recordings	Released: September 23, 2003; Label: Geffen	—	—	
The Beginning of Survival	Released: July 27, 2004; Label: Geffen	—	—	
Dreamland	Released: September 14, 2004; Label: Asylum / Reprise / Nonesuch / Rhino	43	177	
Starbucks Artist's Choice: Joni Mitchell	Released: 2005; Label: Hear Music	—	—	
Songs of a Prairie Girl	Released: April 26, 2005; Label: Asylum / Reprise / Nonesuch / Rhino	—	—	
Studio Albums 1968–1979	Released: February 12, 2013; Label: Warner Bros. UK	—	—	
Love Has Many Faces: A Quartet, a Ballet, Waiting to Be Danced	Released: November 24, 2014; Label: Rhino	—	—	
Joni Mitchell Archives – Vol. 1: The Early Years (1963–1967)	Released: October 30, 2020; Label: Rhino	—	—	
Early Joni – 1963	Released: October 30, 2020; Label: Rhino	—	—	
Archives – Volume 1: The Early Years (1963–1967): Highlights	Released: June 12, 2021; Label: Rhino	—	—	
The Reprise Albums (1968–1971)	Released: June 25, 2021; Label: Rhino	42	—	
Joni Mitchell Archives – Vol. 2: The Reprise Years (1968–1971)	Released: October 29, 2021; Label: Rhino	—	—	
Blue Highlights – Demos/ Outtakes / Live	Released: April 23, 2022; Label: Rhino	—	150	
The Asylum Albums (1972–1975)	Released: September 23, 2022; Label: Rhino	—	—	
Joni Mitchell Archives – Vol. 3: The Asylum Years (1972–1975)	Released: October 6, 2023; Label: Rhino	—	—	
Court and Spark Demos	Released: November 24, 2023; Label: Rhino	—	—	
The Asylum Albums (1976–1980)	Released: June 21, 2024; Label: Rhino	—	—	
Joni Mitchell Archives – Vol. 4: The Asylum Years (1976–1980)	Released: October 4, 2024; Label: Rhino	—	—	
Joni's Jazz	Released: September 5, 2025; Label: Rhino	—	—	
"—" denotes a recording that did not chart or was not released in that territory.

=== Tribute albums ===
- Various Artists – A Tribute to Joni Mitchell (2007)
- Herbie Hancock – River: The Joni Letters (2007)

== Extended plays ==
Title	EP details
Blue 50 (Demos & Outtakes)	Released: June 21, 2021; Label: Rhino

== Singles ==
Title	Year	Peak chart positions							Certifications	Album
Title	Year	CAN	CAN AC	AUS	UK	US	US AC	US Main	Certifications	Album
"Night in the City"	1968	—	—	—	—	—	—	—		Song to a Seagull
"Chelsea Morning"	1969	—	—	—	—	—	—	—		Clouds
"Big Yellow Taxi"^{[A]}	1970	14	17	6	11	67	33	—	MC: Platinum; BPI: Gold	Ladies of the Canyon
"Carey"	1971	27	35	—	—	93	—	—		Blue
"California"	1971	—	—	—	—	—	—	—		Blue
"You Turn Me On, I'm a Radio"	1972	10	3	37	—	25	13	—		For the Roses
"Cold Blue Steel and Sweet Fire"	1973	—	—	—	—	—	—	—		For the Roses
"Raised on Robbery"	1973	51	27	—	—	65	40	—		Court and Spark
"Help Me"	1974	6	4	—	—	7	1	—		Court and Spark
"Free Man in Paris"	1974	16	10	—	—	22	2	—		Court and Spark
"Big Yellow Taxi" (live)	1974	54	—	—	—	24	27	—		Miles of Aisles
"Carey" (live)	1974	—	—	—	—	—	—	—		Miles of Aisles
"In France They Kiss on Main Street"	1976	19	33	—	—	66	32	—		The Hissing of Summer Lawns
"Coyote"	1977	79	—	—	—	—	—	—		Hejira
"Off Night Backstreet"	1978	—	—	—	—	—	—	—		Don Juan's Reckless Daughter
"Jericho"	1978	—	—	—	—	—	—	—		Don Juan's Reckless Daughter
"The Dry Cleaner from Des Moines"	1979	—	—	—	—	—	—	—		Mingus
"Why Do Fools Fall in Love" (live)	1980	—	—	—	—	102	—	—		Shadows and Light
"(You're So Square) Baby I Don't Care"	1982	—	—	—	—	47	—	—		Wild Things Run Fast
"Chinese Café (Unchained Melody)"	1983	—	—	—	—	—	—	—		Wild Things Run Fast
"Underneath the Streetlight"	1983	—	19	—	—	—	—	—		Wild Things Run Fast
"Good Friends"	1985	—	12	—	—	85	—	28		Dog Eat Dog
"Shiny Toys"	1986	—	—	—	—	—	—	—		Dog Eat Dog
"My Secret Place"	1988	41	—	—	—	—	—	—		Chalk Mark in a Rain Storm
"Snakes and Ladders"	1988	—	—	—	—	—	—	32		Chalk Mark in a Rain Storm
"Cool Water"	1988	—	—	—	—	—	—	—		Chalk Mark in a Rain Storm
"Night Ride Home"	1991	—	—	—	—	—	—	—		Night Ride Home
"Come In from the Cold"	1991	27	9	—	—	—	—	—		Night Ride Home
"How Do You Stop"	1994	56	—	—	100	—	—	—		Turbulent Indigo
"Sex Kills"	1994	68	—	—	—	—	—	—		Turbulent Indigo
"Sunny Sunday"	1994	—	—	—	—	—	—	—		Turbulent Indigo
"The Crazy Cries of Love"	1998	—	—	—	—	—	—	—		Taming the Tiger
"Both Sides, Now"	2000	—	64	—	—	—	—	—	MC: Platinum; BPI: Gold	Both Sides Now
"—" denotes releases that did not chart

Notes

- A "Big Yellow Taxi" also peaked at number 19 on the Dutch Singles Chart.

=== Guest singles ===
Year	Title	Artist(s)	Peak chart positions								Certifications	Album
Year	Title	Artist(s)	CAN	AUS	FRA	GER	NLD	NZ	UK	US Dance	Certifications	Album
1997	"Got 'til It's Gone"	Janet Jackson (with Q-Tip)	19	10	11	17	6	4	6	6	BPI: Silver	The Velvet Rope

== Other charted songs ==
Year	Single	Peak chart positions			Album
Year	Single	CAN Dig.	US Dig.	US Rock Dig.	Album
2022	"Both Sides, Now"	32	20	4	Clouds

== Videography ==
=== Video albums ===
Title	Album details
Shadows and Light	Released: 1980; Label: Pioneer Artists/Shout! Factory; Format: LD/VHS/DVD
Refuge of the Roads	Released: 1984; Label: Pioneer Artists/Shout! Factory; Format: LD/VHS/DVD
Come In from the Cold	Released: 1991; Label: Geffen Home Video; Format: LD/VHS
Painting with Words and Music	Released: 1998; Label: Eagle Rock; Format: LD/VHS/DVD/BD
Woman of Heart and Mind (A Life Story)	Released: 2003; Label: Eagle Vision; Format: DVD/BD
The Fiddle and the Drum	Released: 2007; Label: C Major; Format: DVD/BD
Both Sides Now (Live at the Isle of Wight Festival 1970)	Released: 2018; Label: Eagle Vision; Format: DVD/BD
Joni 75: A Birthday Celebration	Released: 2019; Label: Rhino Music Video; Format: DVD

=== Music videos ===
Year	Title	Album	Director
1970	"Woodstock" (live)	Message to Love (1995)	Murray Lerner
1970	"Big Yellow Taxi" (live)	Message to Love (1995)	Murray Lerner
1971	"Both Sides, Now"	Clouds	John D. Wilson
1972	"Big Yellow Taxi"	Ladies of the Canyon	John D. Wilson
1974	"Help Me" (Live)	Court and Spark	Colin Strong
1976	"Hejira"	Hejira	Unknown
1983	"Chinese Cafe"	Refuge of the Roads	Joni Mitchell
1985	"Dog Eat Dog" (live at Farm Aid)	Dog Eat Dog	Unknown
1985	"Good Friends"	Dog Eat Dog	Jim Blashfield
1986	"Shiny Toys"	Dog Eat Dog	Unknown
1988	"My Secret Place" (with Peter Gabriel)	Chalk Mark in a Rain Storm	Anton Corbijn
1988	"Dancin' Clown"	Chalk Mark in a Rain Storm	Unknown
1988	"The Beat of Black Wings"	Chalk Mark in a Rain Storm	Jim Shea & Joni Mitchell
1988	"Lakota"	Chalk Mark in a Rain Storm	Unknown
1989	"Spirit of the Forest" (Gentlemen Without Weapons)	Non-album charity single	Storm Thorgerson
1991	"Night Ride Home"	Night Ride Home	Rocky Schenck
1991	"Come In from the Cold"	Night Ride Home	Rocky Schenck
1991	"Nothing Can Be Done"	Night Ride Home	Rocky Schenck
1991	"Two Grey Rooms"	Night Ride Home	Rocky Schenck
1991	"Passion Play (When All the Slaves Are Free)"	Night Ride Home	Rocky Schenck
1995	"How Do You Stop" (with Seal)	Turbulent Indigo	Rocky Schenck
1997	"Got 'til It's Gone" (Janet Jackson)	The Velvet Rope	Mark Romanek
1998	"Big Yellow Taxi" (live)	Painting with Words and Music	Joan Tosoni
2000	"Both Sides, Now" (live)	An All-Star Tribute to Joni Mitchell (TV Special)	Louis J. Horvitz
2008	"River" (live with Herbie Hancock)	River: The Joni Letters	Jon Hill
2018	"Big Yellow Taxi" (lyric video)	Ladies of the Canyon	Paul Gardner
2018	"Both Sides, Now" (live)	Both Sides Now (Live at The Isle of Wight Festival 1970)	Murray Lerner
2021	"California" (live)	Both Sides Now (Live at The Isle of Wight Festival 1970)	Murray Lerner
2021	"River"	Blue	Matvey Rezanov
2023	"Lead Balloon" (lyric video)	Taming the Tiger	Unknown
