= The Reprise Albums (1968–1971) =

Box set by Joni Mitchell
- Released: June 25, 2021
- Recorded: 1967–1971
- Studios: Sunset Sound Recorders (Hollywood, California); A&M (Hollywood, California)
- Genres: Folk; folk rock; pop
- Label: Rhino

Joni Mitchell chronology
Blue 50 (Demos & Outtakes) (2021)	The Reprise Albums (1968–1971) (2021)	Joni Mitchell Archives – Vol. 2: The Reprise Years (1968–1971) (2021)

Professional ratings
Review scores
Source	Rating
The Absolute Sound	5/5 stars
Record Collector	4/5 stars
Uncut	5/5 stars
Under the Radar	9/10

The Reprise Albums (1968–1971) is a four-disc box set by Canadian singer-songwriter Joni Mitchell, that was released on June 25, 2021, by Rhino Records. The set is the sixth overall release and first box set of remastered albums from the Joni Mitchell Archives, a planned series of releases featuring remastered and unreleased material from the singer's archives. Formatted in chronological order, the first volume of the remaster series includes Mitchell's first four albums, all of which were released on Reprise Records: Song to a Seagull (1968), Clouds (1969), Ladies of the Canyon (1970), and Blue (1971).

== Background and recording ==
On September 10, 2020, Rhino Records announced the creation of the Joni Mitchell Archives, a planned years-long effort by Mitchell and her late manager Elliot Roberts to finally release and remaster previously unreleased recordings in Mitchell's archives. The first round of releases featured a box set of previously unreleased material (Joni Mitchell Archives – Vol. 1: The Early Years (1963–1967)), a condensed version subtitled Highlights, an auxiliary compilation album of the earliest material in the box set (Early Joni – 1963), and a separate release of the live sets featured on the box's last two discs (Live at Canterbury House – 1967). The press release announcing the archive's creation indicated a similar release structure would be followed on a yearly basis, which each release round moving through Mitchell's career in chronological order. However, on April 8, 2021, Rhino announced The Reprise Albums (1968–1971), the first box set of remastered studio albums under the Joni Mitchell Archives banner. The press release indicated that the box set’s release is being timed to celebrate the 50th anniversary of Blue's release, as well as to introduce an additional yearly release to the series’ lineup, as all "future releases in the archive series will arrive in a similar manner, with a box set focused on studio albums from a specific era, followed by an official 'Archives' release looking at unreleased audio from the same period." The box set of unreleased material recorded during this time period, Joni Mitchell Archives – Vol. 2: The Reprise Years (1968–1971), was released on November 12, 2021.

Like the cover for Early Joni – 1963, the artwork of The Reprise Albums features a previously never-before-seen self-portrait by Mitchell originally drawn sometime during the period of time from which the set’s releases span. The set also features liner notes by American singer-songwriter Brandi Carlile, who wrote that Mitchell's magnum opus Blue is "the greatest album ever made. Blue didn’t make me a better songwriter. Blue made me a better woman… No matter what we are dealing with in these times we can rejoice and know that of all the ages we could have lived through, we lived in the time of Joni Mitchell.” Song to a Seagull features a new mix by Mitchell and audio mixer Matt Lee, as she was compelled to "fix" the album's original mix that sounded to her like "it was recorded under a jello bowl." The poor-sounding quality of the original mix has been attributed to album producer David Crosby's unconventional recording setup that captured an excessive amount of ambient noise.

== Track listing ==
All tracks are written by Joni Mitchell.

=== Disc 1 – Song to a Seagull (1968) ===
I Came to the City
No.	Title	Length
1.	"I Had a King"	3:37
2.	"Michael from Mountains"	3:41
3.	"Night in the City"	2:30
4.	"Marcie"	4:35
5.	"Nathan La Franeer"	3:18

Out of the City and Down to the Seaside
No.	Title	Length
6.	"Sisotowbell Lane"	4:05
7.	"The Dawntreader"	5:04
8.	"The Pirate of Penance"	2:44
9.	"Song to a Seagull"	3:51
10.	"Cactus Tree"	4:35
Total length:		38:00

=== Disc 2 – Clouds (1969) ===
No.	Title	Length
1.	"Tin Angel"	4:09
2.	"Chelsea Morning"	2:35
3.	"I Don't Know Where I Stand"	3:13
4.	"That Song About the Midway"	4:38
5.	"Roses Blue"	3:52
6.	"The Gallery"	4:12
7.	"I Think I Understand"	4:28
8.	"Songs to Aging Children Come"	3:10
9.	"The Fiddle and the Drum"	2:50
10.	"Both Sides, Now"	4:32
Total length:		36:52

=== Disc 3 – Ladies of the Canyon (1970) ===
No.	Title	Length
1.	"Morning Morgantown"	3:12
2.	"For Free"	4:31
3.	"Conversation"	4:21
4.	"Ladies of the Canyon"	3:32
5.	"Willy"	3:00
6.	"The Arrangement"	3:32
7.	"Rainy Night House"	3:22
8.	"The Priest"	3:39
9.	"Blue Boy"	2:53
10.	"Big Yellow Taxi"	2:16
11.	"Woodstock"	5:25
12.	"The Circle Game"	4:50
Total length:		44:33

=== Disc 4 – Blue (1971) ===
No.	Title	Length
1.	"All I Want"	3:32
2.	"My Old Man"	3:33
3.	"Little Green"	3:25
4.	"Carey"	3:00
5.	"Blue"	3:00
6.	"California"	3:48
7.	"This Flight Tonight"	2:50
8.	"River"	4:00
9.	"A Case of You"	4:20
10.	"The Last Time I Saw Richard"	4:13
Total length:		35:41

== Charts ==
Chart performance for The Reprise Albums (1968–1971)
Chart (2021)	Peak position
Belgian Albums (Ultratop Flanders)	33
Belgian Albums (Ultratop Wallonia)	120
German Albums (Offizielle Top 100)	29
Irish Albums (IRMA)	52
Scottish Albums (Official Charts)	7
Swiss Albums (Schweizer Hitparade)	45
UK Albums (Official Charts)	42
US Top Album Sales (Billboard)	7
US Americana/Folk Albums (Billboard)	5
US Top Rock Albums (Billboard)	44
