= Joni Mitchell Archives – Vol. 2: The Reprise Years (1968–1971) =

Box set by Joni Mitchell
- Released: November 12, 2021
- Recorded: 1968–1971
- Genre: Folk
- Label: Rhino

Joni Mitchell chronology
The Reprise Albums (1968–1971) (2021)	Joni Mitchell Archives – Vol. 2: The Reprise Years (1968–1971) (2021)	Live at Carnegie Hall – 1969 (2021)

Joni Mitchell Archives – Vol. 2: The Reprise Years (1968–1971) is a five-disc box set by Canadian singer-songwriter Joni Mitchell, released on November 12, 2021, by Rhino Records. The box set is the seventh overall release and second offering of unreleased material from the Joni Mitchell Archives, a planned series of releases containing remastered material from the singer's personal archives. Formatted in chronological order, the second volume of the series consists of the archived material that was recorded during Mitchell's tenure at Reprise Records, which includes the years between the release of her debut studio album, Song to a Seagull (1968) and her fourth studio album, Blue (1971).

== Background and recording ==
On September 10, 2020, Rhino Records announced the creation of the Joni Mitchell Archives, a planned years-long effort by Mitchell and her late manager Elliot Roberts to finally release and remaster previously unreleased recordings in Mitchell's archives. The first round of releases featured a box set of previously unreleased material (Joni Mitchell Archives – Vol. 1: The Early Years (1963–1967)), a condensed version subtitled Highlights, an auxiliary compilation album of the earliest material in the box set (Early Joni – 1963), and a separate release of the live sets featured on the box's last two discs (Live at Canterbury House – 1967). The press release announcing the archive's creation indicated a similar release structure would be followed on a yearly basis, with each release round moving through Mitchell's career in chronological order. On April 8, 2021, Rhino announced Joni Mitchell Archives – Vol. 2: The Reprise Years (1968–1971) was scheduled to be released in October of that year (the box set was later pushed back to November 12). An alteration to the yearly release schedule was also announced in the press release; releasing earlier that same year would be a box set of remastered albums titled The Reprise Albums (1968–1971), and all "future releases in the archive series will arrive in a similar manner, with a box set focused on studio albums from a specific era, followed by an official 'Archives' release looking at unreleased audio from the same period."

== Critical reception ==
Professional ratings
Aggregate scores
Source	Rating
Metacritic	92/100
Review scores
Source	Rating
AllMusic	4/5 stars
American Songwriter	5/5 stars
Pitchfork	8.8/10

Upon release, Joni Mitchell Archives – Vol. 2: The Reprise Years (1968–1971) received critical acclaim from music critics. At Metacritic, which assigns a normalized rating out of 100 to reviews from mainstream critics, the album has an average score of 92 based on 7 reviews, indicating "universal acclaim".

== Track listing ==
All tracks are written by Joni Mitchell, except where noted.

=== Disc 1 ===
Home Demo: Joni’s Home (Late 1967/Early 1968)
No.	Title	Length
1.	"Midnight Cowboy" (Version One)	2:31
2.	"The Dawntreader" (Demo with Vocal Overdub)	2:01
3.	"Song to a Seagull"	3:54
4.	"Midnight Cowboy" (Version Two)	3:55

Jane Lurie’s Apartment: Chelsea, Manhattan, New York City, NY (Late 1967/Early 1968)
No.	Title	Length
5.	"The Way It Is"	3:28
6.	"Turn Around" (Incomplete)	1:22

Home Demo: Joni’s Home (Late 1967/Early 1968)
No.	Title	Length
7.	"I Had a King" (Demo with Vocal Overdub)	3:38
8.	"Roses Blue" (Demo with Peacock Harp Overdub)	3:24
9.	"The Fiddle and the Drum" (Piano Demo)	3:25

Song to a Seagull Session: Sunset Sound, Hollywood, CA (January 24, 1968)
No.	Title	Length
10.	"Jeremy"	3:34
11.	"Conversation"	5:01
12.	"Both Sides, Now"	4:09
13.	"The Gift of the Magi"	4:18

Jane Lurie’s Apartment: Chelsea, Manhattan, New York City, NY (Early 1968)
No.	Title	Length
14.	"It's Easy"	2:12
15.	"Another Melody"	4:56

Live at Canterbury House: Ann Arbor, MI (March 10, 1968)
No.	Title	Length
16.	"Introduction"	1:02
17.	"Jeremy"	3:40
18.	"Songs to Aging Children Come"	3:46

=== Disc 2 ===
Le Hibou Coffee House: Ottawa, Ontario, Canada (March 19, 1968) – First Set (Recorded by Jimi Hendrix)
No.	Title	Length
1.	"Night in the City"	2:33
2.	"Come to the Sunshine"	3:00
3.	"The Pirate of Penance" (Intro)	0:44
4.	"The Pirate of Penance"	3:27
5.	"Conversation" (Intro)	0:19
6.	"Conversation"	5:22
7.	"The Way It Is"	3:50
8.	"The Dawntreader" (Intro)	0:29
9.	"The Dawntreader"	4:52

Le Hibou Coffee House: Ottawa, Ontario, Canada (March 19, 1968) – Second Set (Recorded by Jimi Hendrix)
No.	Title	Length
10.	"Marcie"	4:39
11.	"Nathan La Franeer" (Intro)	0:38
12.	"Nathan La Franeer"	3:14
13.	"Dr. Junk" (Intro)	0:33
14.	"Dr. Junk"	2:22
15.	"Michael from Mountains" (Intro)	0:31
16.	"Michael from Mountains"	4:06
17.	"Go Tell the Drummer Man"	3:17
18.	"I Don't Know Where I Stand" (Intro)	2:55
19.	"I Don't Know Where I Stand"	3:21
20.	"Sisotowbell Lane" (Intro)	1:21
21.	"Sisotowbell Lane"	4:14
22.	"Ladies of the Canyon" (Intro)	1:47
23.	"Ladies of the Canyon"	3:54

Studio Session, Western Recorders: Hollywood, CA (May 31, 1968)
No.	Title	Length
24.	"Come to the Sunshine"	2:55

Jane Lurie’s Apartment: Chelsea, Manhattan, New York City, NY (Summer 1968)
No.	Title	Length
25.	"My Second Album"	2:28
26.	"Lambert, Hendricks & Ross"	0:34
27.	"The Pirate of Penance"	2:43

Top Gear BBC Radio Broadcast: London, England (September 23, 1968)
No.	Title	Length
28.	"Chelsea Morning" (Intro)	0:14
29.	"Chelsea Morning" (with the John Cameron Group)	2:23
30.	"The Gallery" (Intro)	0:25
31.	"The Gallery"	3:50
32.	"Night in the City" (Intro)	0:35
33.	"Night in the City" (with the John Cameron Group)	2:21

=== Disc 3 ===
Live at Carnegie Hall, New York City, NY (February 1, 1969) – First Set
No.	Title	Length
1.	"Chelsea Morning"	2:49
2.	"A Valentine for Joni" (Dialogue)	1:12
3.	"Cactus Tree"	4:55
4.	"Night in the City"	2:40
5.	"I Had a King"	4:12
6.	"Blue Boy"	3:06
7.	"My American Skirt" (Dialogue)	0:59
8.	"The Fiddle and the Drum"	2:40
9.	"Spoony's Wonderful Adventure" (Dialogue)	1:00
10.	"That Song About the Midway"	5:19
11.	"Both Sides Now"	4:35

Live at Carnegie Hall, New York City, NY (February 1, 1969) – Second Set
No.	Title	Writer(s)	Length
12.	"Marcie"		5:01
13.	"Nathan La Franeer"		3:36
14.	"The Gallery" (Intro)		1:03
15.	"The Gallery"		4:29
16.	"Hunter"		4:24
17.	"Morning Morgantown"		3:34
18.	"Get Together" (Intro)		0:39
19.	"Get Together"	Chet Powers	5:26
20.	"The Circle Game / Little Green" (Intro)		1:22
21.	"The Circle Game / Little Green" (Medley)		9:02
22.	"Michael from Mountains" (Encore)		4:48

=== Disc 4 ===
Live at Carnegie Hall, New York City, NY (February 1, 1969) – Second Set
No.	Title	Length
1.	"Urge for Going" (Intro / Encore)	1:21
2.	"Urge for Going" (Encore)	6:01

Clouds Sessions: A&M Studios, Hollywood, CA (Spring 1969)
No.	Title	Length
3.	"Conversation"	5:14
4.	"Blue Boy"	3:33
5.	"The Priest"	3:58

Jane Lurie’s Apartment: Chelsea, Manhattan, New York City, NY (Mid 1969)
No.	Title	Length
6.	"Jesus"	2:21
7.	"Playing piano and vocalizing"	1:59

The Dick Cavett Show ABC TV Broadcast: New York City, NY (August 18, 1969)
No.	Title	Length
8.	"Chelsea Morning"	3:31
9.	"Willy"	3:19
10.	"For Free"	4:15
11.	"Interview" (with Dick Cavett)	2:43
12.	"The Fiddle and the Drum"	2:46

Ladies of the Canyon Demo Session: A&M Studios, Hollywood, CA (Late 1969)
No.	Title	Length
13.	"Woodstock"	5:03

Live at Centennial Auditorium, Saskatoon, Saskatchewan, Canada (November 1, 1969)
No.	Title	Length
14.	"As I Lie Thinking In My Backyard On August 2nd"	0:58
15.	"Roses Blue"	3:59
16.	"Rainy Night House"	3:30

Ladies of the Canyon Sessions: A&M Studios, Hollywood, CA (Late 1969)
No.	Title	Length
17.	"Ladies of the Canyon" (with Cellos)	3:34
18.	"Blue Boy" (with Recorder Coda)	3:19

In Concert BBC TV Broadcast (September 3, 1970)
No.	Title	Length
19.	"All I Want"	4:17

Blue Demo Sessions: A&M Studios, Hollywood, CA (September 1970)
No.	Title	Length
20.	"A Case of You"	4:00
21.	"California"	3:39

Greenpeace Benefit Concert for Amchitka (October 16, 1970)
No.	Title	Length
22.	"Introduction by James Taylor"	0:16
23.	"Medley: Big Yellow Taxi / Bony Morone"	4:00

=== Disc 5 ===
In Concert BBC TV Broadcast: London, England (October 29, 1970)
No.	Title	Length
1.	"Introduction"	0:21
2.	"That Song About The Midway"	5:23
3.	"The Gallery" (Intro)	0:33
4.	"The Gallery"	4:27
5.	"Hunter"	2:39
6.	"River" (Intro)	0:17
7.	"River"	3:39
8.	"My Old Man"	3:55
9.	"The Priest"	4:01
10.	"This is a mountain dulcimer" (Dialogue)	3:43
11.	"Carey"	3:06
12.	"A Case Of You" (with James Taylor)	4:38
13.	"California" (Intro; with James Taylor)	0:14
14.	"California" (with James Taylor)	4:25
15.	"For Free" (Intro; with James Taylor)	0:51
16.	"For Free" (with James Taylor)	4:37
17.	"The Circle Game" (Intro; with James Taylor)	1:40
18.	"The Circle Game" (with James Taylor)	7:23
19.	"You Can Close Your Eyes" (Intro; with James Taylor)	0:40
20.	"You Can Close Your Eyes" (with James Taylor)	2:54
21.	"Both Sides, Now"	3:47
22.	"Big Yellow Taxi" (Intro)	0:26
23.	"Big Yellow Taxi"	3:18

Blue Sessions: A&M Studios, Hollywood, CA (Late 1970/Early 1971)
No.	Title	Length
24.	"Hunter"	2:57
25.	"River" (with French Horns)	4:05
26.	"Urge For Going" (with String Trio)	5:05

== Personnel ==
Credits adapted from Discogs.

Performers (Note: Tracks are formatted as "Disc Number"/"Track Number(s)", i.e. "2/3" is "Disc 2, Track 3")

- Joni Mitchell – vocals (all tracks); guitar; bass, peacock harp (1/8), piano (1/9, 4/7)
- Terresa Adams – cello (4/17)
- Don Bagley – cello arrangement (4/17)
- Kenny Baldock – bass (2/29, 2/33)
- John Cameron – harpsichord (2/29, 2/33); piano (2/29, 2/33)
- Tony Carr – drums (2/29, 2/33)
- Dave Cousins – guitar (2/29, 2/33)
- Jim Horn – recorder (4/18)
- Myra Kestenbaum – viola (5/24–5/26)
- Russ Kunkel – drums; percussion (5/24–5/26)
- Edgar Lustgarten – cello (5/24–5/26)
- Harold McNair – flute (2/29, 2/33)
- Willie Ruff – cello (5/24–5/26)
- Sheldon Sanov – violin (5/24–5/26)
- Paul Shure – violin (5/24–5/26)

Production and recording

- Bernie Andrews – recording (2/28–2/23)
- Art Chryst – recording (1/10–1/13)
- Tony Converse – producer (4/8–4/12)
- Bernie Grundman – mastering
- John Etchells – recording (5/1–5/23)
- Michael Graves – audio restoration
- Jeff Griffin – producer (5/1–5/23)
- Jimi Hendrix – recording (2/1–2/23)
- Stanley Johnston – mixing (2/24)
- Morley Lang – recording (4/8–4/12)
- Henry Lewy – mixing (4/3–4/5, 4/13, 4/17–4/18, 4/20–4/21, 5/24–5/26); recording (4/3–4/5, 4/13, 4/17–4/18, 4/20–4/21, 5/24–5/26)
- Jane Lurie – recording (1/5–1/6, 1/15–1/16, 2/25–2/27, 4/6–4/7)
- Joni Mitchell – producer; recording (1/1–1/4, 1/7–1/9)
- Tony Miller – recording (4/19)
- Patrick Milligan – mixing (1/1–1/4, 1/7–1/13, 4/17–4/18, 5/24–5/26); producer (all tracks)
- Michael Nemo – recording (2/24)
- Thomas Root – recording (1/16–1/18)
- Dave Zefferett – recording (4/22–4/23)

Design

- Joel Bernstein – photography; research
- Cameron Crowe – interviewer; liner notes
- Lisa Glines – art direction; design
- Joni Mitchell – illustration; interviewee
- Doran Tyson – product manager

== Charts ==
Chart performance for Joni Mitchell Archives – Vol. 2: The Reprise Years (1968–1971)
Chart (2021)	Peak position
Belgian Albums (Ultratop Flanders)	103
German Albums (Offizielle Top 100)	74
Scottish Albums (Official Charts)	60
Swiss Albums (Schweizer Hitparade)	89
US Top Album Sales (Billboard)	82
US Americana/Folk Albums (Billboard)	20
UK Album Sales Chart(OCC)	46

== Blue Highlights ==
Blue Highlights

Compilation album by Joni Mitchell
- Released: April 23, 2022
- Recorded: 1970
- Genre: Folk
- Length: 44:05
- Label: Rhino

Joni Mitchell chronology
Live at Carnegie Hall – 1969 (2021)	Blue Highlights (2022)	The Asylum Albums (1972–1975) (2022)

A condensed version of Joni Mitchell Archives – Vol. 2: The Reprise Years (1968–1971), titled Blue Highlights, was released on April 23, 2022, by Rhino Records. The sampler album was released exclusively as a vinyl LP for Record Store Day 2022, and was made with "Joni’s insight, cooperation and creative input". Blue Highlights is the ninth overall release and fourth auxiliary release of the Joni Mitchell Archives, and like the album its material is derived from, features a track listing that is in chronological order. The vinyl release is limited to 9,000 copies in the United States and 16,000 copies worldwide. It debuted at number 150 on the Billboard 200, making it the first release from the archive series to appear on the chart.

=== Track listing ===
Side one
No.	Title	Length
1.	"A Case of You" (Blue Demo Sessions: A&M Studios, September 1970)	4:01
2.	"California" (Blue Demo Sessions: A&M Studios, September 1970)	3:39
3.	"All I Want" (In Concert BBC TV Broadcast: London, England, September 3, 1970)	4:16
4.	"Hunter" (Blue Demo Sessions: A&M Studios, Late 1970)	2:57
5.	"Urge For Going" (with strings; Blue Demo Sessions: A&M Studios, Late 1970)	5:05
6.	"River" (with French horns; Blue Demo Sessions: A&M Studios, Late 1970)	4:05

Side two
No.	Title	Length
1.	"My Old Man" (In Concert BBC TV Broadcast: London, England, October 29, 1970)	3:55
2.	"This is a mountain dulcimer" (Dialogue; In Concert BBC TV Broadcast: London, England, October 29, 1970)	3:43
3.	"Carey" (In Concert BBC TV Broadcast: London, England, October 29, 1970)	3:12
4.	"A Case of You" (with James Taylor; In Concert BBC TV Broadcast: London, England, October 29, 1970)	4:32
5.	"California" (Intro; with James Taylor; In Concert BBC TV Broadcast: London, England, October 29, 1970)	0:14
6.	"California" (with James Taylor; In Concert BBC TV Broadcast: London, England, October 29, 1970)	4:26

=== Charts ===
Chart performance for Blue Highlights
Chart (2022)	Peak position
US Billboard 200	150
US Americana/Folk Albums (Billboard)	6
US Top Rock Albums (Billboard)	30
US Indie Store Album Sales (Billboard)	6
UK Album Sales Chart(OCC)	54
