= Love Has Many Faces (box set) =

Love Has Many Faces: A Quartet, a Ballet, Waiting to Be Danced

Box set by Joni Mitchell
- Released: November 24, 2014 (Note: Some sources list the set's release date as November 17, 2014, while others list it as being a week later November 24. Mitchell's official website lists its release date as November 24.)
- Genres: Jazz; orchestral
- Length: 238:49
- Labels: Reprise; Asylum; Nonesuch; Rhino
- Producers: Joni Mitchell; Thomas Dolby (Note: On "Tax Free"); Larry Klein (Note: On tracks from Dog Eat Dog, Chalk Mark in a Rain Storm, Night Ride Home, Turbulent Indigo, Both Sides Now and Travelogue)
- Compiler: Joni Mitchell

Joni Mitchell chronology
Amchitka (2009)	Love Has Many Faces: A Quartet, a Ballet, Waiting to Be Danced (2014)	Joni Mitchell Archives – Vol. 1: The Early Years (1963–1967) (2020)

Love Has Many Faces (subtitled A Quartet, a Ballet, Waiting to Be Danced) is a box set by Canadian musician Joni Mitchell. It was released on November 24, 2014, through Rhino Entertainment. The box set compiles songs spanning Mitchell's fourth album, Blue to her most recent album, Shine (2007).

== Background ==
Compiled over a period of 18 months, Love Has Many Faces collects romantically themed songs from Mitchell's back catalogue, organized into four "acts". Included in its packaging is new paintings and poetry by Mitchell.

While the set was originally planned as one disc, creating what Mitchell referred to as an "emotional roller coaster", it was eventually expanded to four discs, allowing certain themes to be emphasized and "moods [to be] sustained". This single-disc compilation was intended to accompany a ballet to be performed in 2014 by the Alberta Ballet, until Mitchell made the decision to expand the project.

The set notably does not include any material from Mitchell's first three albums—Song to a Seagull (1968), Clouds (1969), and Ladies of the Canyon (1970). In an interview with Billboard, she attributed the exclusion of the latter two albums to a dislike of her vocal performances on them.

== Reception ==
Professional ratings
Review scores
Source	Rating
AllMusic	4/5 stars
The Irish Times	4/5 stars
Paste	9.5/10
PopMatters	7/10

In a review for AllMusic, Mark Deming awarded the set four stars out of five. While he felt that some fans may have been disappointed by its emphasis on less-popular and overlooked later material, he also opined that the lesser-known material "play[s] significantly better than they did on her uneven projects of the '80s and '90s", and also stated that the "lyrical strength and bold musical vision that inform [the set's] music are genuinely remarkable on nearly every tune." Writing for Paste, Douglas Heselgrave gave the set a rating of 9.5 out of 10 and also commended it for featuring work from the latter part of Mitchell's career, highlighting "Chinese Café/Unchained Melody", "Love Puts on a New Face" and "Borderline" and praising them as being "as lyrically and musically interesting as anything she recorded during the first decade of her career". In 2016, the box set won the Grammy Award for Best Album Notes.

== Track listing ==
All tracks are written by Joni Mitchell, except where noted.

Act 1: Birth of Rock 'n' Roll Days
No.	Title	Original release	Length
1.	"In France They Kiss on Main Street"	The Hissing of Summer Lawns (1975)	3:18
2.	"Ray's Dad's Cadillac"	Night Ride Home (1991)	4:33
3.	"You Turn Me On, I'm a Radio"	For the Roses (1972)	2:39
4.	"Harlem in Havana"	Taming the Tiger (1998)	4:25
5.	"Car on a Hill"	Court and Spark (1974)	2:58
6.	"Dancin' Clown"	Chalk Mark in a Rain Storm (1988)	3:51
7.	"River"	Blue (1971)	4:00
8.	"Chinese Café/Unchained Melody" (Mitchell/Alex North, Hy Zaret)	Wild Things Run Fast (1982)	5:17
9.	"Harry's House/Centerpiece" (Mitchell/John Hendricks, Harry Edison)	The Hissing of Summer Lawns	6:47
10.	"Shades of Scarlett Conquering"	The Hissing of Summer Lawns	4:58
11.	"Number One"	Chalk Mark in a Rain Storm	3:47
12.	"The Windfall (Everything for Nothing)"	Night Ride Home	5:14
13.	"Come in from the Cold"	Night Ride Home	3:39
Total length:			55:26

Act 2: The Light Is Hard to Find (Note: Late in the set's production, Mitchell chose to rearrange the track order of disc two, leading to a disrepancy between the order listed on the set's packaging and the actual order of songs on the album. The track listing here reflects what actually appears on the disc.)
No.	Title	Original release	Length
1.	"Court and Spark"	Court and Spark	2:46
2.	"Not to Blame"	Turbulent Indigo (1994)	4:16
3.	"Nothing Can Be Done" (Mitchell, Larry Klein)	Night Ride Home	4:52
4.	"Comes Love" (Lew Brown, Sam H. Stept, Charles Tobias)	Both Sides Now (2000)	4:28
5.	"Trouble Child"	Court and Spark	4:00
6.	"No Apologies"	Taming the Tiger	4:17
7.	"Moon at the Window"	Wild Things Run Fast	3:43
8.	"Blue"	Blue	3:03
9.	"Tax Free" (Mitchell, Klein)	Dog Eat Dog (1985)	4:15
10.	"The Wolf That Lives in Lindsey"	Mingus (1979)	6:33
11.	"Hana"	Shine (2007)	3:42
12.	"Hejira"	Travelogue (2002)	6:47
13.	"Stay in Touch"	Taming the Tiger	2:58
14.	"Night Ride Home"	Night Ride Home	3:26
Total length:			59:06

Act 3: Love Has Many Faces
No.	Title	Original release	Length
1.	"You're My Thrill" (Sidney Clare, Jay Gorney)	Both Sides Now	3:51
2.	"The Crazy Cries of Love" (Mitchell, Don Freed)	Taming the Tiger	3:53
3.	"Love Puts on a New Face"	Taming the Tiger	3:46
4.	"Borderline"	Turbulent Indigo	4:47
5.	"A Strange Boy"	Hejira (1976)	4:17
6.	"You Dream Flat Tires"	Travelogue	3:45
7.	"Love"	Travelogue	5:38
8.	"All I Want"	Blue	3:33
9.	"Be Cool"	Travelogue	5:09
10.	"Yvette in English" (Mitchell, David Crosby)	Turbulent Indigo	5:16
11.	"Just Like This Train"	Court and Spark	4:23
12.	"Carey"	Blue	3:02
13.	"The Only Joy in Town"	Night Ride Home	5:09
Total length:			56:29

Act 4: If You Need Me I'll Be at the Bar
No.	Title	Original release	Length
1.	"Don Juan's Reckless Daughter"	Don Juan's Reckless Daughter (1977)	6:38
2.	"Two Grey Rooms"	Night Ride Home	3:55
3.	"God Must Be a Boogie Man"	Travelogue	3:55
4.	"Down to You"	Court and Spark	5:36
5.	"A Case of You"	Blue	4:22
6.	"The Last Time I Saw Richard"	Travelogue	4:58
7.	"Raised on Robbery"	Court and Spark	3:05
8.	"Sweet Sucker Dance" (Mitchell, Charles Mingus)	Mingus	8:05
9.	"Lakota" (Mitchell, Klein)	Chalk Mark in a Rain Storm	6:26
10.	"Cool Water" (Bob Nolan, with revised lyrics by Mitchell)	Chalk Mark in a Rain Storm	5:25
11.	"Amelia"	Travelogue	6:46
12.	"Both Sides Now"	Both Sides Now	5:44
13.	"My Best to You" (Gene Willadsen, Isham Jones)	Taming the Tiger	2:53
Total length:			67:48
