= Joni Mitchell Archives – Vol. 3: The Asylum Years (1972–1975) =

Box set by Joni Mitchell
- Released: October 6, 2023
- Recorded: 1972–1975
- Genre: Folk
- Label: Rhino

Joni Mitchell chronology
Joni Mitchell at Newport (2023)	Joni Mitchell Archives – Vol. 3: The Asylum Years (1972–1975) (2023)	Court and Spark Demos (2023)

Singles from Joni Mitchell Archives – Vol. 3: The Asylum Years
- 1. "Help Me (Demo)" Released: August 17, 2023; 2. "Like Veils Said Lorraine" Released: September 7, 2023

Joni Mitchell Archives – Vol. 3: The Asylum Years (1972–1975) is a five-disc box set by Canadian singer-songwriter Joni Mitchell, released on October 6, 2023, by Rhino Records. The set is the eleventh overall release and third offering of unreleased material from the Joni Mitchell Archives, a planned series of releases containing remastered material from the singer's personal archives. Formatted in chronological order, the third volume of the series consists of the archived material that was recorded during the first half of Mitchell's tenure at Asylum Records, which includes the years between the release of her fifth studio album, For the Roses (1972) and her seventh studio album, The Hissing of Summer Lawns (1975).

== Background and release ==
On September 10, 2020, Rhino Records announced the creation of the Joni Mitchell Archives, a planned years-long effort by Mitchell and her late manager Elliot Roberts to finally release and remaster previously unreleased recordings in Mitchell's archives. The first round of releases featured a box set of previously unreleased material (Joni Mitchell Archives – Vol. 1: The Early Years (1963–1967)), a condensed version subtitled Highlights, an auxiliary compilation album of the earliest material in the box set (Early Joni – 1963), and a separate release of the live sets featured on the box's last two discs (Live at Canterbury House – 1967). The press release announcing the archive's creation indicated a similar release structure would be followed on a yearly basis, with each release round moving through Mitchell's career in chronological order. On April 8, 2021, an alteration to the yearly release schedule was disclosed in the press release announcing Joni Mitchell Archives – Vol. 2: The Reprise Years (1968–1971), saying "future releases in the archive series will arrive in a similar manner, with a box set focused on studio albums from a specific era, followed by an official 'Archives' release looking at unreleased audio from the same period."

The second box set of remasters to be released under the 'Archives' banner, The Asylum Albums (1972–1975), was released on September 23, 2022. Following the cadence laid out in the Vol. 2: The Reprise Years (1968–1971) press release, Vol. 3: The Asylum Years (1972–1975) was the next 'Archives' boxset to be released. However, approximately two months before the release of The Asylum Albums (1972–1975), Mitchell appeared unannounced as a special guest in the closing performance of the final day of the Newport Folk Festival in Rhode Island as part of a set billed as "Brandi Carlile and Friends". After her successful return to the stage, Mitchell indicated that she wanted to perform live again, and later announced a headline concert, billed as "Joni Jam 2", which took place at Washington State's Gorge Amphitheatre on June 9–10, 2023. She also performed live at a concert on March 2, 2023, in Washington D.C. to celebrate being awarded the 2023 Gershwin Prize for her lifetime contributions to popular music. Mitchell's yearlong return to performing live was bookended by the release of her surprise Newport set as a live album, titled Joni Mitchell at Newport, on July 28, 2023. One month after, on August 17, 2023, it was announced that Joni Mitchell Archives – Vol. 3: The Asylum Years (1972–1975) was scheduled to be released on October 6, 2023.

== Critical reception ==
Professional ratings
Aggregate scores
Source	Rating
Metacritic	90/100
Review scores
Source	Rating
Pitchfork	8.6/10

Upon release, Joni Mitchell Archives – Vol. 3: The Asylum Years (1972–1975) received critical acclaim from music critics. At Metacritic, which assigns a normalized rating out of 100 to reviews from mainstream critics, the album has an average score of 90 based on 11 reviews, indicating "universal acclaim".

Andy Cush of Pitchfork wrote that "as demonstrated on Archives, Vol. 3, the excellent latest entry in a series of releases that collect previously unreleased demos and alternate versions from her back catalog, [Mitchell] already had a germ of the Court and Spark sound in mind when she began recording its predecessor" and Mitchell's "commitment to simple truth [...] was already firmly in place by the period covered by Asylum Years, which is marked primarily by her development as a musician rather than a writer".

== Track listing ==
All tracks are written by Joni Mitchell, except "Medley: Bony Moronie / Summertime Blues / You Never Can Tell" (Larry Williams / Eddie Cochran, Jerry Capehart / Chuck Berry) and "Twisted" (Wardell Gray, Annie Ross).

=== Disc one ===
Graham Nash, David Crosby Session: Wally Heider Studios, Hollywood, CA (December 13, 1971)
No.	Title	Length
1.	"Cold Blue Steel and Sweet Fire"	3:58
2.	"For the Roses"	4:03

For the Roses Demos: A&M Studios, Hollywood, CA (Late 1971/Early 1972)
No.	Title	Length
3.	"Banquet"	3:13
4.	"Lesson in Survival"	3:15
5.	"Like Veils Said Lorraine"	2:15
6.	"See You Sometime"	3:04

Live at Carnegie Hall: New York City, NY (February 23, 1972)
No.	Title	Length
7.	"This Flight Tonight"	3:30
8.	"Electricity"	3:26
9.	"Cold Blue Steel and Sweet Fire"	5:22
10.	"Big Yellow Taxi"	3:16
11.	"Blue"	2:38
12.	"For Free"	4:37
13.	"Banquet"	3:20
14.	"All I Want"	3:38
15.	"A Case of You" (intro)	0:39
16.	"A Case of You"	4:41
17.	"Carey" (intro)	1:29
18.	"Carey"	3:19
19.	"Lesson in Survival"	3:18
20.	"Woodstock"	4:06
21.	"You Turn Me On, I'm a Radio" (intro)	0:29
22.	"You Turn Me On, I'm a Radio"	2:54
23.	"For the Roses" (intro)	0:37
24.	"For the Roses"	3:52

=== Disc two ===
Live at Carnegie Hall: New York City, NY (February 23, 1972)[cont.]
No.	Title	Length
1.	"Both Sides Now"	5:42
2.	"My Old Man"	3:54
3.	"The Circle Game" (intro)	1:50
4.	"The Circle Game"	5:57

For the Roses early sessions: Wally Heider Studios, Hollywood, CA (April 16–21, 1972)
No.	Title	Length
5.	"Medley: Bony Moronie / Summertime Blues / You Never Can Tell" (with James Taylor)	3:59
6.	"Electricity" (with James Taylor)	3:32
7.	"You Turn Me On, I'm a Radio" (with Neil Young and the Stray Gators)	3:26
8.	"See You Sometime" (early version with bass & drums)	3:11
9.	"You Turn Me On, I'm a Radio" (early version with bass & drums)	2:58

Live at Royal Festival Hall: London, England (May 5, 1972)
No.	Title	Length
10.	"Judgement of the Moon and Stars (Ludwig's Tune)" (intro)	0:45
11.	"Judgement of the Moon and Stars (Ludwig's Tune)"	5:49

For the Roses sessions: A&M Studios, Hollywood, CA (July–August 1972)
No.	Title	Length
12.	"Blonde in the Bleachers" (alternate guitar mix)	2:43
13.	"Let the Wind Carry Me" (piano/vocal mix)	4:00
14.	"Barangrill" (guitar/vocal mix)	2:52
15.	"Cold Blue Steel and Sweet Fire" (sax guide vocal)	4:17
16.	"Sunrise Raga"	3:42
17.	"Twisted" (early alternate version)	2:01

James Bay Benefit Concert: Paul Sauvé Arena, Montreal, Quebec, Canada (April 15, 1973)
No.	Title	Length
18.	"Big Yellow Taxi" (intro)	0:59
19.	"Big Yellow Taxi"	2:40

=== Disc three ===
Court and Spark Demos: A&M Studios, Hollywood, CA (Summer 1973)
No.	Title	Length
1.	"Piano Suite: Down to You / Court and Spark / Car on a Hill / Down to You"	12:33
2.	"People's Parties"	3:02
3.	"Help Me"	3:31
4.	"Just Like This Train"	3:48
5.	"Raised on Robbery"	2:55
6.	"Trouble Child"	3:54

Wild Tales [Graham Nash] Session: Rudy Records Studios, San Francisco, CA (August. 25, 1973)
No.	Title	Length
7.	"Raised on Robbery" (early working version)	3:10
8.	"Raised on Robbery" (with Neil Young and the Santa Monica Flyers)	3:36

Court and Spark Sessions: A&M Studios, Hollywood, CA (September–October 1973)
No.	Title	Length
9.	"People's Parties" (early alternate take)	2:50
10.	"Trouble Child" (early alternate take)	3:40
11.	"Car on a Hill" (early alternate take)	2:37
12.	"Down to You" (alternate take)	5:37
13.	"The Same Situation" (alt piano/vocal mix)	3:09
14.	"Bonderia"	3:21

Live at Dorothy Chandler Pavilion: Los Angeles, CA (March 3, 1974)
No.	Title	Length
15.	"Introduction"	0:38
16.	"This Flight Tonight" (with Tom Scott & the L.A. Express)	3:38
17.	"You Turn Me On, I'm a Radio" (with Tom Scott & the L.A. Express)	4:23
18.	"Free Man in Paris" (with Tom Scott & the L.A. Express)	3:14
19.	"The Same Situation" (with Tom Scott & the L.A. Express)	3:35
20.	"Just Like This Train" (with Tom Scott & the L.A. Express)	4:18

=== Disc four ===
Live at Dorothy Chandler Pavilion: Los Angeles, CA (March 3, 1974)[cont.]
No.	Title	Length
1.	"Rainy Night House" (with Tom Scott & the L.A. Express)	4:16
2.	"Woodstock" (with Tom Scott & the L.A. Express)	5:04
3.	"Cactus Tree"	5:29
4.	"Big Yellow Taxi"	3:16
5.	"People's Parties" (intro)	6:06
6.	"People's Parties"	3:02
7.	"All I Want"	3:49
8.	"A Case of You"	5:04
9.	"For the Roses" (intro)	7:52
10.	"For the Roses"	4:14
11.	"Cold Blue Steel and Sweet Fire" (with Tom Scott)	5:30
12.	"Blue"	2:48
13.	"For Free" (with Tom Scott)	4:40
14.	"Trouble Child" (with Tom Scott & the L.A. Express)	4:11
15.	"Help Me" (with Tom Scott & the L.A. Express)	3:58
16.	"Car on a Hill" (with Tom Scott & the L.A. Express)	2:53

=== Disc five ===
Live at New Victoria Theatre: London, England (April 22, 1974)
No.	Title	Length
1.	"Jericho" (intro)	0:29
2.	"Jericho"	3:17

Live at Wembley Stadium: London, England (September 14, 1974)
No.	Title	Length
3.	"Woman of Heart and Mind"	3:35

The Hissing of Summer Lawns Demos: A&M Studios, Hollywood, CA (1975)
No.	Title	Length
4.	"In France They Kiss on Main Street"	3:06
5.	"Edith and the Kingpin"	3:33
6.	"Don't Interrupt the Sorrow"	2:28
7.	"Shades of Scarlett Conquering"	4:52
8.	"The Boho Dance"	3:54
9.	"Harry's House"	4:02
10.	"Dreamland"	4:08

The Hissing of Summer Lawns Sessions: A&M Studios, Hollywood, CA (1975)
No.	Title	Length
11.	"In France They Kiss on Main Street" (guitar/alternate vocal)	3:25
12.	"The Jungle Line" (alternate version)	4:36
13.	"Edith and the Kingpin" (alternate version)	3:36
14.	"Don't Interrupt the Sorrow" (alternate version)	4:14
15.	"Shades of Scarlett Conquering" (alternate version)	5:41
16.	"The Boho Dance" (alternate version)	3:55
17.	"Dreamland" (early alternate band version)	4:43

== Charts ==
Chart performance for Joni Mitchell Archives – Vol. 3: The Asylum Years (1972–1975)
Chart (2023)	Peak position
Belgian Albums (Ultratop Flanders)	96
Hungarian Physical Albums (MAHASZ)	25
Japanese Hot Albums (Billboard Japan)	82
Scottish Albums (Official Charts)	14
UK Album Sales (OCC)	14
US Top Album Sales (Billboard)	46
US Top Current Album Sales (Billboard)	35

== Court and Spark Demos ==
Court and Spark Demos

Compilation album by Joni Mitchell
- Released: November 24, 2023
- Recorded: Summer 1973
- Studios: A&M Studios, Hollywood
- Genre: Folk
- Length: 29:43
- Label: Rhino

Joni Mitchell chronology
Joni Mitchell Archives – Vol. 3: The Asylum Years (1972–1975) (2023)	Court and Spark Demos (2023)	The Asylum Albums (1976–1980) (2024)

An excerpt of the Joni Mitchell Archives – Vol. 3: The Asylum Years (1972–1975), titled Court and Spark Demos, was released on November 24, 2023, by Rhino Records. It is the twelfth overall release and fifth auxiliary release of the Joni Mitchell Archives. The album, which is formatted in the same order as the first six tracks of the set's third disc, was released exclusively on vinyl LP for the 2023 Record Store Day Black Friday event.

=== Track listing ===
Court and Spark Demos
No.	Title	Length
1.	"Piano Suite" ("Down to You" / "Court and Spark" / "Car on a Hill" / "Down to You")	12:33
2.	"People's Parties"	3:02
3.	"Help Me"	3:31
4.	"Just Like This Train"	3:48
5.	"Raised on Robbery"	2:55
6.	"Trouble Child"	3:54

=== Charts ===
Chart performance for Court and Spark Demos
Chart (2023)	Peak position
US Top Current Album Sales (Billboard)	38
US Indie Store Album Sales (Billboard)	13
