= Joni Mitchell Archives =

Previously unreleased material by Joni Mitchell

The project's official logo, which features a prominent visual allusion to Mitchell's given Saulteaux name

The Joni Mitchell Archives is an ongoing project to release previously unreleased recorded material by Canadian singer-songwriter Joni Mitchell. So far, each new release schedule consists of a box set collection, a compilation with material on the box set release, and a live album. The project is being overseen by Mitchell and Patrick Milligan, director of A&R for Rhino Records, the label through which the project's offerings are being released. The first release also received input from Neil Young, who had experience with the release of his own extensive archival series, and Mitchell and Young's late manager Elliot Roberts, who died during the process of planning the first box set, and to whom the release is dedicated.

The project's logo prominently features a polar bear, a visual allusion to the traditional Saulteaux name bestowed upon Mitchell by a childhood friend at her seventy-fifth birthday party. Kāwāsapizit-Wābiski-Makawko-Ikwē – the name granted and recognized by the Yellow Quill First Nation – translates to 'Sparkling White Bear Woman' in English.

== Box sets ==
=== Unreleased material ===
==== Volume 1: The Early Years (1963–1967) ====
The first volume of unreleased archived material, Joni Mitchell Archives – Vol. 1: The Early Years (1963–1967), was released on October 30, 2020. The five-disc box set includes the archived material that was recorded in the years preceding the release of Mitchell's debut studio album, Song to a Seagull (1968). The box set also includes a booklet with liner notes featuring conversations about the time period between writer/filmmaker Cameron Crowe and Mitchell.

==== Volume 2: The Reprise Years (1968–1971) ====
The second volume of unreleased archived material, Joni Mitchell Archives – Vol. 2: The Reprise Years (1968–1971), was released November 12, 2021. The box set consists of the archived material that was recorded during Mitchell's tenure at Reprise Records, which includes the years between the release of her debut studio album, Song to a Seagull (1968) and her fourth studio album, Blue (1971). The set is available in multiple formats, including as a five-disc CD set and, exclusive to the official Joni Mitchell web store, a limited edition 10-LP vinyl set. Like the first set, the second volume also includes a booklet with liner notes featuring conversations about the time period between Cameron Crowe and Mitchell.

==== Volume 3: The Asylum Years (1972–1975) ====
The third volume of unreleased material, Joni Mitchell Archives – Vol. 3: The Asylum Years (1972–1975), was released on October 6, 2023. The box set consists of the archived material that was recorded during the first half of Mitchell's tenure at Asylum Records, which includes the years between the release of her fifth studio album, For the Roses (1972) and her seventh studio album, The Hissing of Summer Lawns (1975).

==== Volume 4: The Asylum Years (1976–1980) ====
The fourth volume of unreleased material, Joni Mitchell Archives – Vol. 4: The Asylum Years (1976–1980), was released on October 4, 2024. he box set consists of the archived material that was recorded during the second half of Mitchell's tenure at Asylum Records, which includes the years between the release of her eighth studio album, Hejira (1976) and her second live album, Shadows and Light (1980).

=== Album remasters ===
==== The Reprise Albums (1968–1971) ====
The first volume of album remasters, The Reprise Albums (1968–1971), was released on July 2, 2021, by Rhino Records. The box set includes Mitchell's first four albums, all of which were released on Reprise Records: Song to a Seagull (1968), Clouds (1969), Ladies of the Canyon (1970), and Blue (1971). In the case of Song To A Seagull, the original mix has been recently updated by mixer Matt Lee, overseen by Mitchell. The box includes an essay by Brandi Carlile.

==== The Asylum Albums (1972–1975) ====
The second volume of album remasters, The Asylum Albums (1972–1975), was released on September 23, 2022, by Rhino Records. The box set includes Mitchell's first four albums released on Asylum Records: For the Roses (1972), Court and Spark (1974), Miles of Aisles (1974), and The Hissing of Summer Lawns (1975).

==== The Asylum Albums (1976–1980) ====
The third volume of album remasters, The Asylum Albums (1976–1980), was released on June 21, 2024, by Rhino Records. The box set includes the latter half of Mitchell's albums released on Asylum Records: Hejira (1976), Don Juan's Reckless Daughter (1977), Mingus (1979), and Shadows and Light (1980).

== Auxiliary releases ==
=== Early Joni – 1963 ===
The first auxiliary release in the series, Early Joni – 1963, was released on October 30, 2020, by Rhino Records. The album features one of Mitchell's first live performances, a broadcast set on Saskatoon radio station CFQC AM. The cover art for the release features a self portrait drawn by Mitchell that is based on an early photo in her personal archive, and marks the first visual artwork that she had completed in several years.

=== Volume 1: The Early Years (1963–1967): Highlights ===
The second auxiliary release in the series, a condensed version of Joni Mitchell Archives – Vol. 1: The Early Years (1963–1967), subtitled Highlights, was released on June 12, 2021, by Rhino Records. The truncated version of the Archives – Volume 1: The Early Years (1963–1967) compilation was released exclusively as a vinyl LP for Record Store Day 2021 Drop 1. Highlights features a track listing that is in chronological order. The 180-gram vinyl was limited to 5,500 copies in the United States and 15,000 copies worldwide.

=== Blue 50 (Demos & Outtakes) ===
The third auxiliary release in the series, Blue 50 (Demos & Outtakes), was released by Rhino Records on June 21, 2021, to celebrate the 50th anniversary of Blue's release. The digital-only EP release consists of five unreleased demos recorded during the making of Blue.

=== Blue Highlights ===
The fourth auxiliary release in the series, a condensed version of Joni Mitchell Archives – Vol. 2: The Reprise Years (1968–1971), titled Blue Highlights, was released on April 23, 2022, by Rhino Records. The sampler album was released exclusively as a vinyl LP for Record Store Day 2022, and was made with "Joni's insight, cooperation and creative input". Blue Highlights is the ninth overall release and fourth auxiliary release of the Joni Mitchell Archives, and like the album its material is derived from, features a track listing that is in chronological order. The vinyl release is limited to 9,000 copies in the United States and 16,000 copies worldwide. It debuted at number 150 on the Billboard 200, making it the first release from the archive series to appear on the chart.

=== Court and Spark Demos ===
An excerpt of the Joni Mitchell Archives – Vol. 3: The Asylum Years (1972–1975), titled Court and Spark Demos, was released on November 24, 2023, by Rhino Records. It is the twelfth overall release and fifth auxiliary release of the Joni Mitchell Archives. The album, which is formatted in the same order as the first six tracks of the set's third disc, was released exclusively on vinyl LP for the 2023 Record Store Day Black Friday event.

=== Hejira Demos ===
An excerpt of the Joni Mitchell Archives – Vol. 4: The Asylum Years (1976–1980), titled Hejira Demos, was released on November 29, 2024, by Rhino Records. It features material recorded during the first of two different Hejira recording sessions recovered by the archival team, and is the fifteenth overall release and sixth auxiliary release of the Joni Mitchell Archives project. The album, which is formatted in the same order as the first nine tracks of the set's third disc, was released exclusively on vinyl LP for the 2024 Record Store Day Black Friday event.

== Live albums ==
=== Live at Canterbury House – 1967 ===
The first live album of the series, Live at Canterbury House – 1967, was released on October 30, 2020. The expansive, three-set recording was captured at the Canterbury House student missionary in Ann Arbor, Michigan, in 1967. The live album was pressed exclusively on vinyl.

=== Live at Carnegie Hall – 1969 ===
The second live album of the series, Live at Carnegie Hall – 1969, was released on November 12, 2021. The two-set recording was captured at Carnegie Hall in New York City, New York on February 1, 1969. The live album was pressed exclusively on vinyl.
