= The Asylum Albums (1972–1975) =

Box set by Joni Mitchell
- Released: September 23, 2022
- Recorded: 1972–1975
- Venues: Miles of Aisles; Universal Amphitheatre (Los Angeles, California); Dorothy Chandler Pavilion (Los Angeles, California); Berkeley Community Theater (Berkeley, California)
- Studios: For the Roses, Court and Spark, and The Hissing of Summer Lawns; A&M (Hollywood, California)
- Label: Rhino

Joni Mitchell chronology
Blue Highlights (2022)	The Asylum Albums (1972–1975) (2022)	Joni Mitchell at Newport (2023)

The Asylum Albums (1972–1975) is a four-disc box set by Canadian singer-songwriter Joni Mitchell, released on September 23, 2022, by Rhino Records. The set is the tenth overall release and second box set of remastered albums from the Joni Mitchell Archives, a planned series of releases featuring remastered and unreleased material from the singer's personal archives. Formatted in chronological order, the second volume of the remaster series includes Mitchell's first four albums released on Asylum Records: For the Roses (1972), Court and Spark (1974), Miles of Aisles (1974), and The Hissing of Summer Lawns (1975).

In 2024, Rhino released this exact box (same packaging, graphics, etc) set in a multichannel version on their Quadio imprint - on Blu Ray discs instead of CDs - that has all four albums in newly-done Dolby Atmos mixes, as well as the original '70s quad mixes, and the recent new stereo remasters from the 2022 edition.

== Background and recording ==
On September 10, 2020, Rhino Records announced the creation of the Joni Mitchell Archives, a planned years-long effort by Mitchell and her late manager Elliot Roberts to finally release and remaster previously unreleased recordings in Mitchell's archives. It was Rhino's intention to follow a certain release schedule, specifically stating that all "future releases in the archive series will arrive in a similar manner, with a box set focused on studio albums from a specific era, followed by an official 'Archives' release looking at unreleased audio from the same period." The 2021 release schedule for the Archives series followed said format, first with the release of The Reprise Albums (1968–1971) in June followed by the release of Joni Mitchell Archives – Vol. 2: The Reprise Years (1968–1971) in November. The record label committed to this release schedule again while announcing The Asylum Albums (1972–1975), albeit acknowledging the third volume of unreleased material would arrive the following year.

Like The Reprise Albums (1968–1971), The Asylum Albums (1972–1975) features original artwork by Mitchell, a picturesque scene painted in the Canadian wilderness that inspired For the Roses. The box set also features an essay written by Mitchell's friend, peer, and archival mentor Neil Young. All of the material on this release was remastered by series regular collaborator Bernie Grundman.

== Track listing ==
All tracks are written by Joni Mitchell, except where noted.

=== Disc 1 – For the Roses (1972) ===
No.	Title	Length
1.	"Banquet"	3:01
2.	"Cold Blue Steel and Sweet Fire"	4:17
3.	"Barangrill"	2:52
4.	"Lesson in Survival"	3:11
5.	"Let the Wind Carry Me"	3:56
6.	"For the Roses"	3:48
7.	"See You Sometime"	2:56
8.	"Electricity"	3:01
9.	"You Turn Me On, I'm a Radio"	2:39
10.	"Blonde in the Bleachers"	2:42
11.	"Woman of Heart and Mind"	2:38
12.	"Judgement of the Moon and Stars (Ludwig's Tune)"	5:19

=== Disc 2 – Court and Spark (1974) ===
No.	Title	Writer(s)	Length
1.	"Court and Spark"		2:46
2.	"Help Me"		3:22
3.	"Free Man in Paris"		3:02
4.	"People's Parties"		2:15
5.	"Same Situation"		2:57
6.	"Car on a Hill"		3:02
7.	"Down to You"		5:38
8.	"Just Like This Train"		4:24
9.	"Raised on Robbery"		3:06
10.	"Trouble Child"		4:00
11.	"Twisted"	Annie Ross; Wardell Gray	2:21

=== Disc 3 – Miles of Aisles (1974) ===
No.	Title	Length
1.	"You Turn Me On, I'm a Radio" (Live)	4:09
2.	"Big Yellow Taxi" (Live)	3:09
3.	"Rainy Night House" (Live)	4:04
4.	"Woodstock" (Live)	4:29
5.	"Cactus Tree" (Live)	5:01
6.	"Cold Blue Steel and Sweet Fire" (Live)	5:23
7.	"Woman of Heart and Mind" (Live)	3:40
8.	"A Case of You" (Live)	4:42
9.	"Blue" (Live)	2:49
10.	"The Circle Game" (Live)	6:29
11.	"People's Parties" (Live)	2:42
12.	"All I Want" (Live)	3:21
13.	"Real Good for Free" (Live)	4:27
14.	"Both Sides, Now" (Live)	4:14
15.	"Carey" (Live)	3:30
16.	"The Last Time I Saw Richard" (Live)	3:35
17.	"Jericho" (Live)	3:26
18.	"Love or Money" (Live)	4:50

=== Disc 4 – The Hissing of Summer Lawns (1975) ===
No.	Title	Writer(s)	Length
1.	"In France They Kiss on Main Street"		3:19
2.	"The Jungle Line"		4:25
3.	"Edith and the Kingpin"		3:38
4.	"Don't Interrupt the Sorrow"		4:05
5.	"Shades of Scarlett Conquering"		4:59
6.	"The Hissing of Summer Lawns"	Joni Mitchell; John Guerin	3:01
7.	"The Boho Dance"		3:48
8.	"Harry's House / Centerpiece"	Mitchell; Jon Hendricks; Harry Edison	6:48
9.	"Sweet Bird"		4:12
10.	"Shadows and Light"		4:19

== Charts ==
Chart performance for The Asylum Albums (1972–1975)
Chart (2022)	Peak position
Belgian Albums (Ultratop Wallonia)	171
German Albums (Offizielle Top 100)	93
Scottish Albums (Official Charts)	26
UK Album Sales (OCC)	26
US Top Album Sales (Billboard)	31
US Top Current Album Sales (Billboard)	21
