= Live at Carnegie Hall – 1969 =

Live album by Joni Mitchell
- Released: November 12, 2021
- Recorded: February 1, 1969 (Carnegie Hall); February 14, 1969 (Zellerbach Hall)
- Venue: Carnegie Hall (New York City, New York); Zellerbach Hall (Berkeley, California)
- Label: Rhino Records

Joni Mitchell chronology
Joni Mitchell Archives – Vol. 2: The Reprise Years (1968–1971) (2021)	Live at Carnegie Hall – 1969 (2021)	Blue Highlights (2022)

Live at Carnegie Hall – 1969 is a live album by singer-songwriter Joni Mitchell, released on November 12, 2021, by Rhino Records. The album, which is the eighth overall release and the second live release of the Joni Mitchell Archives, features the storied, two-set recording that was captured at New York City's famed Carnegie Hall in 1969. This separate live album was pressed exclusively on vinyl, and serves as a companion to Joni Mitchell Archives – Vol. 2: The Reprise Years (1968–1971), the box set from which its material is derived.

== Background and recording ==
Like its predecessor, Joni Mitchell Archives – Vol. 2: The Reprise Years (1968–1971) contains a number of recordings from Mitchell's personal archive, including a two-set recording of Joni's debut performance at the famed Carnegie Hall in New York City, New York on February 1, 1969. Her sold-out performance at the venue was attended by Bob Dylan and Graham Nash, and earned rave reviews in the press; Fred Kirby wrote in Billboard that Mitchell had "charmed a packed Carnegie Hall audience on Saturday ... Miss Mitchell doesn’t merely sing a song, the fine folk artist effectively interprets her material. And what a lineup of material! Beginning with 'Chelsea Morning' and ending with a medley of ‘The Circle Game’ and the new ‘Little Green,’ the outstanding material flowed."

While discussing her career during the 1970s for Archives – Vol. 2, Joni recalled to Cameron Crowe about the night of her performance, specifically her experience with her parents and their thoughts about her garb of choice:

I flew my parents [Bill and Myrtle] in for the show. We walked over to Carnegie Hall from the Plaza Hotel. Graham was wearing a floor-length maxi coat, black velvet, but with a pink-and-white chiffon tie-dye scarf. And I was wearing a green-and-white plaid coat. I've still got it. It looked like something from a Dickens play. My mother was embarrassed to be seen with us!

In the liner notes for the vinyl release, Graham Nash also recounted his then-partner's clothing for her performance:

Joni had bought a long vintage skirt that was made for a parade. On the front, in colorful sequins, was a large American eagle, and on the back was ... a large artichoke. At some point earlier in the evening Myrtle said, 'Oh, Joan. Is that what you're going to wear at Carnegie Hall? They look like rags.'

Mitchell's father defended her after her mother made the rags comment, saying she looked like a "queen" in her outfit. She was thankful for his support and love, and said he "gave back [herself]". The design of the bald eagle found on the front of Joni's jacket from that evening is etched into the vinyl on the set's sixth side.

== Track listing ==
All tracks are written by Joni Mitchell, except where noted.

Side one – first set
No.	Title	Length
1.	"Chelsea Morning"	2:49
2.	"A Valentine for Joni" (Dialogue)	1:12
3.	"Cactus Tree"	4:55
4.	"Night in the City"	2:50
5.	"I Had a King"	3:55

Side two – first set (cont.)
No.	Title	Length
1.	"Blue Boy (Note: Recorded live at Zellerbach Hall, University of California, Berkeley, CA, February 14, 1969)"	3:23
2.	"My American Skirt" (Dialogue)	0:49
3.	"The Fiddle and the Drum"	2:41
4.	"Spoony's Wonderful Adventure" (Dialogue)	0:59
5.	"That Song About the Midway"	5:19
6.	"Both Sides, Now"	4:35

Side three – second set
No.	Title	Length
1.	"Marcie"	5:01
2.	"Nathan La Franeer"	3:36
3.	"The Gallery" (Intro)	1:03
4.	"The Gallery"	4:29
5.	"Hunter"	4:24
6.	"Morning Morgantown"	3:24

Side four – second set (cont.)
No.	Title	Writer(s)	Length
1.	"Get Together" (Intro)		0:42
2.	"Get Together"	Chet Powers	5:26
3.	"The Circle Game/Little Green" (Intro)		0:51
4.	"The Circle Game/Little Green" (Medley)		9:04

Side five – encore
No.	Title	Length
1.	"Michael From Mountains"	5:38
2.	"Urge for Going" (Intro)	1:19
3.	"Urge for Going"	6:01
Total length:		12:58

== Personnel ==
Credits adapted from Discogs.

Performers

- Joni Mitchell – vocals; guitar

Production and recording

- Allison Boron – project assistance
- Tristan Calditaran – project assistance
- Sheryl Farber – project assistance
- Marcy Gensic – project assistance
- Bernie Grundman – mastering
- Mike Johnson – project assistance
- Joni Mitchell – reissue producer
- Tal Miller – project assistance
- Patrick Milligan – producer
- Susanne Savage – project assistance
- Mark Spector – project assistance

Design

- Joel Bernstein – photography
- Graham Nash – liner notes
- Doran Tyson – product manager
- Shannon Ward – packaging manager
