= Blue 50 (Demos & Outtakes) =

EP by Joni Mitchell
- Released: June 21, 2021
- Recorded: 1971
- Venue: A&M (Hollywood, California)
- Length: 19:47
- Label: Rhino Records

Joni Mitchell chronology
Joni Mitchell Archives – Vol. 1: The Early Years (1963–1967): Highlights (2020)	Blue 50 (Demos & Outtakes) (2021)	The Reprise Albums (1968–1971) (2021)

Blue 50 (Demos & Outtakes) is an extended play by singer-songwriter Joni Mitchell, released on June 21, 2021, by Rhino Records. The extended play, which is the fifth overall and the third auxiliary release of the Joni Mitchell Archives, was released exclusively to digital music and streaming platforms to celebrate the fiftieth anniversary of the release of Blue (1971). The cover utilizes the original Blue color treatment on an unreleased photo of Mitchell taken by Tim Considine during the album's original cover photoshoot.

== Background and recording ==
Three of the included songs later made it on the album in finished form: a demo of "California", a demo of an early version "A Case of You" with alternate lyrics, and an outtake of "River" that features additional instrumentation from French horns. A demo of "Urge for Going" features added strings; originally written by Mitchell in the mid-1960s, she revisited the song while recording Blue and later released a different version of the song as the B-side to "You Turn Me On, I'm a Radio" from For the Roses in 1972. The EP also includes the first official release of "Hunter", an unreleased song that had previously been performed live by Mitchell and was "cut from Blue at the last minute".

== Track listing ==
All tracks are written by Joni Mitchell.

No.	Title	Length
1.	"A Case of You" (Blue Sessions Demo)	4:00
2.	"California" (Blue Sessions Demo)	3:39
3.	"Hunter" (Blue Sessions)	2:57
4.	"River" (with French horns; Blue Sessions)	4:05
5.	"Urge for Going" (with strings; Blue Sessions)	5:05
Total length:		19:47

== Charts ==
Chart performance for Blue 50 (Demos & Outtakes)
Chart (2021)	Peak position
UK Album Downloads (OCC)	25
US Billboard 200	150
US Americana/Folk Albums (Billboard)	6
