= Joni Mitchell Archives – Vol. 1: The Early Years (1963–1967) =

Box set by Joni Mitchell
- Released: October 30, 2020
- Recorded: 1963–1967
- Genre: Folk
- Label: Rhino

Joni Mitchell chronology
Love Has Many Faces: A Quartet, a Ballet, Waiting to Be Danced (2014)	Joni Mitchell Archives – Vol. 1: The Early Years (1963–1967) (2020)	Early Joni – 1963 (2020)

Joni Mitchell Archives – Vol. 1: The Early Years (1963–1967) is a five-disc box set by Canadian singer-songwriter Joni Mitchell, released on October 30, 2020, by Rhino Records. The box set is the first release of the Joni Mitchell Archives, a planned series of releases containing remastered material from the singer's archives. Formatted in chronological order, the first volume of the series includes the archived material that was recorded in the years preceding the release of Mitchell's debut studio album, Song to a Seagull (1968). The album won the Grammy Award for Best Historical Album at the 64th Annual Grammy Awards.

== Background and recording ==
In 1963, now-retired radio DJ Barry Bowman of CFQC 600 lived with three of his friends in downtown Saskatoon, Canada. During that summer, Bowman and his friends met and befriended Joni Mitchell, who at the time was still going by her birth name of Joni Anderson. The group would frequently congregate with Mitchell at the large house they were renting, the local swimming pool, or the South Saskatchewan River, where they "drank beer and ate hot dogs." One of Bowman's friends and co-tenants, Danny Evanishen, referred to that period of time as being "the summer that Joni came to [them]." Evanishen is also attributed as being the person who encouraged Mitchell to take up playing the guitar, loaning her his guitar to play in lieu of her ukulele. Encouraged by Mitchell's budding talent, Bowman invited her to the radio station to record nine traditional folk songs over the course of two nights. He gave her a copy of the audition tape and kept the masters, which were later unearthed by his ex-wife in 2015.

In addition to Bowman's rediscovered master tapes, the box set also contains a number of recordings from Mitchell's personal archive, including an expansive, three-set recording captured at the Canterbury House Episcopal student ministry in Ann Arbor, Michigan, in 1967. The Canterbury House recording made headlines when it was unearthed with lost Neil Young recordings in 2018 by the Michigan History Project. Young ended up being a consultant during the assemblage of the Archive Collection's inaugural release, having had experience with the release of his own extensive archival series, though the project was ultimately spearheaded by Mitchell and Young's late manager Elliot Roberts, who died during the process of planning the release, and to whom the release is dedicated. Planning for the release continued throughout the COVID-19 pandemic, with in-person meetings between Mitchell and label personnel transitioning to telephone and video calls.

In the press release announcing the creation of the Joni Mitchell Archives and the release of the first volume, Mitchell included a statement that emphasized the introspective importance of the revisitation of her earliest recordings:

The early stuff, I shouldn’t be such a snob against it. A lot of these songs, I just lost them. They fell away. They only exist in these recordings. For so long I rebelled against the term, ‘I was never a folksinger.’ I would get pissed off if they put that label on me. I didn’t think it was a good description of what I was. And then I listened and…it was beautiful. It made me forgive my beginnings. And I had this realization... I was a folksinger!

== Critical reception ==
Professional ratings
Aggregate scores
Source	Rating
Metacritic	87/100
Review scores
Source	Rating
AllMusic	4.5/5 stars
American Songwriter	4/5 stars
Mojo	4/5 stars
The New York Times	favorable
Rolling Stone	4/5 stars

Upon release, Joni Mitchell Archives – Vol. 1: The Early Years (1963–1967) received critical acclaim from music critics. At Metacritic, which assigns a normalized rating out of 100 to reviews from mainstream critics, the album has an average score of 87 based on 6 reviews, indicating "universal acclaim".

In a positive review for The New York Times, Lindsay Zoladz called the collection "A thorough but imposing six hours of material [that] is less about any specific unearthed gem than the larger transformation it charts." She took a special liking to The Canterbury House live recordings on the last two discs, saying they "[showcase] a performer with lifetimes' more wisdom than the happy-to-be-here ingénue of 1963." Stephen Thomas Erlewine writing for AllMusic gave the box set four-and-a-half out of five stars, feeling that it supplied previously undocumented material in Mitchell's discography: "her formative years as a folkie, playing intimate venues and radio stations while recording the occasional demo or gift tape at home." For this reason, coupled with Mitchell's "evolution" into a fully-fledged artist over the duration of the recordings, Erlewine determines that the release is "a biography in the form of archival tapes" that is "historically important" and "absorbing on a sheer musical level". David Browne of Rolling Stone gave the album a four-out-of-five rating, though he thought the set could use some "pruning", writing that it was not apparent as to "why we need to hear multiple versions of some of these songs—three each of "Urge for Going" and "Both Sides Now," none of which is dramatically different." However, in the end, he concluded that the set had "gems ... scattered throughout", and called the last two discs "the keepers". A review in Mojo said that the set "[enhances] the listener's wonder at her rapid evolution" and compared Mitchell's artistic growth as going from "shoreline to treetops in under four years".

Aside from the warm critical reception, the album received a Grammy Award for Best Historical Album at the 64th Annual Grammy Awards in 2022.

== Track listing ==
All tracks are written by Joni Mitchell, except where noted.

=== Disc 1 ===
Radio Station CFQC AM, Saskatoon, Saskatchewan, Canada (ca. 1963)
No.	Title	Writer(s)	Length
1.	"House of the Rising Sun"	Traditional	2:54
2.	"John Hardy"	Traditional	2:25
3.	"Dark as a Dungeon"	Merle Travis	3:07
4.	"Tell Old Bill"	Traditional	3:00
5.	"Nancy Whiskey"	Traditional	3:23
6.	"Anathea"	Traditional	4:10
7.	"Copper Kettle"	Albert Frank Beddoe	2:18
8.	"Fare Thee Well (Dink's Song)"	Traditional	2:48
9.	"Molly Malone"	Traditional	2:46

Live at the Half Beat: Yorkville, Toronto, Canada (October 21, 1964) – First Set
No.	Title	Writer(s)	Length
10.	"Introduction"		1:03
11.	"Nancy Whiskey"	Traditional	3:03
12.	"The Crow on the Cradle" (Intro)		0:21
13.	"The Crow on the Cradle"	Sydney Carter	4:07
14.	"Pastures of Plenty"	Woody Guthrie	3:00
15.	"Every Night When the Sun Goes In"	Traditional	4:28
16.	"Sail Away" (Intro)		0:27
17.	"Sail Away"	John Phillips, Dick Weissman	3:09

Live at the Half Beat: Yorkville, Toronto, Canada (October 21, 1964) – Second Set
No.	Title	Writer(s)	Length
18.	"John Hardy"	Traditional	3:04
19.	"Dark as a Dungeon"	Merle Travis	4:04
20.	"Maids When You're Young Never Wed an Old Man" (Intro)		0:19
21.	"Maids When You're Young Never Wed an Old Man"	Traditional	2:41
22.	"The Dowie Dens of Yarrow"	Traditional	3:22
23.	"Deportee (Plane Crash at Los Gatos)"	Woody Guthrie	5:21

Joni's Parents' House: Saskatoon, Saskatchewan, Canada (February 1965)
No.	Title	Writer(s)	Length
24.	"The Long Black Rifle"	Lawrence Coleman, Norman Gimbel	3:17
25.	"Ten Thousand Miles"	Traditional	2:51
26.	"Seven Daffodils"	Lee Hays, Fran Moseley	2:59

=== Disc 2 ===
Myrtle Anderson Birthday Tape: Detroit, MI (1965)
No.	Title	Length
1.	"Urge for Going"	4:25
2.	"Born to Take the Highway"	3:35
3.	"Here Today and Gone Tomorrow"	2:51

Jac Holzman Demo: Detroit, MI (August 24, 1965)
No.	Title	Length
4.	"What Will You Give Me"	3:49
5.	"Let It Be Me"	3:33
6.	"The Student Song"	2:36
7.	"Day After Day"	2:10
8.	"Like The Lonely Swallow"	2:51

Let's Sing Out, CBC TV: University of Manitoba, Winnipeg, MB, Canada (October 4, 1965)
No.	Title	Writer(s)	Length
9.	"Favourite Colour"		2:37
10.	"Me and My Uncle"	John Phillips	2:39

Home Demo: Detroit, MI (ca. 1966)
No.	Title	Length
11.	"Sad Winds Blowin'"	2:39

Let's Sing Out, CBC TV: Laurentian University, London, ON, Canada (October 24, 1966)
No.	Title	Length
12.	"Just Like Me"	2:40
13.	"Night in the City"	2:34

Live at the 2nd Fret: Philadelphia, PA (November 1966)
No.	Title	Length
14.	"Brandy Eyes"	2:27
15.	"Urge for Going" (Intro)	1:04
16.	"Urge for Going"	4:55
17.	"What's the Story Mr. Blue" (Intro)	1:01
18.	"What's the Story Mr. Blue"	3:03
19.	"Eastern Rain"	3:53
20.	"The Circle Game" (Intro)	3:52
21.	"The Circle Game"	5:13
22.	"Night in the City" (Intro)	1:32
23.	"Night in the City"	3:33

=== Disc 3 ===
Folklore, WHAT FM: Philadelphia, PA, (March 12, 1967)
No.	Title	Length
1.	"Both Sides Now" (Intro)	2:05
2.	"Both Sides Now"	3:46
3.	"The Circle Game" (Intro)	1:00
4.	"The Circle Game"	5:18

Live at the 2nd Fret: Philadelphia, PA (March 17, 1967) – Second Set
No.	Title	Length
5.	"Morning Morgantown"	3:31
6.	"Born to Take the Highway"	4:53
7.	"Song to a Seagull" (Intro)	1:31
8.	"Song to a Seagull"	3:55

Live at the 2nd Fret: Philadelphia, PA (March 17, 1967) – Third Set
No.	Title	Length
9.	"Winter Lady"	3:08
10.	"Both Sides Now" (Intro)	1:06
11.	"Both Sides Now"	3:48

Folklore, WHAT FM: Philadelphia, PA (March 19, 1967)
No.	Title	Length
12.	"Eastern Rain" (Intro)	1:01
13.	"Eastern Rain"	3:56
14.	"Blue on Blue" (Intro)	0:18
15.	"Blue on Blue"	2:33

"A Record of My Changes" – Michael's Birthday Tape: North Carolina (May 1967)
No.	Title	Length
16.	"Gemini Twin"	2:53
17.	"Strawflower Me"	1:50
18.	"A Melody in Your Name"	3:59
19.	"Tin Angel"	4:18
20.	"I Don't Know Where I Stand"	3:00
21.	"Joni Improvising"	1:32

Folklore, WHAT FM: Philadelphia, PA (May 28, 1967)
No.	Title	Writer(s)	Length
22.	"Sugar Mountain" (Intro)
23.	"Sugar Mountain"	Neil Young

=== Disc 4 ===
Home Demo: New York City, NY (ca. June 1967)
No.	Title	Length
1.	"I Had a King"	3:29
2.	"Free Darling"	2:45
3.	"Conversation"	5:11
4.	"Morning Morgantown"	3:07
5.	"Dr. Junk"	2:19
6.	"Gift of the Magi"	4:01
7.	"Chelsea Morning"	2:34
8.	"Michael from Mountains"	4:02
9.	"Cara's Castle"	3:03
10.	"Jeremy" (Incomplete)	2:08

Live at Canterbury House: Ann Arbor, MI (October 27, 1967) – First Set
No.	Title	Length
11.	"Conversation"	5:07
12.	"Come to the Sunshine" (Intro)	0:35
13.	"Come to the Sunshine"	3:01
14.	"Chelsea Morning" (Intro)	0:54
15.	"Chelsea Morning"	2:50
16.	"Gift of the Magi" (Intro)	1:15
17.	"Gift of the Magi"	4:27
18.	"Play Little David"	2:53
19.	"The Dowie Dens of Yarrow" (Intro)	1:11
20.	"The Dowie Dens of Yarrow"	3:22
21.	"I Had a King"	4:10
22.	"Free Darling" (Intro)	0:24
23.	"Free Darling"	2:33
24.	"Cactus Tree" (Intro)	1:51
25.	"Cactus Tree"	4:56

=== Disc 5 ===
Live at Canterbury House: Ann Arbor, MI (October 27, 1967) – Second Set
No.	Title	Length
1.	"Little Green"	4:04
2.	"Marcie" (Intro)	2:27
3.	"Marcie"	4:48
4.	"Ballerina Valerie" (Intro)	1:32
5.	"Ballerina Valerie"	1:56
6.	"The Circle Game"	4:50
7.	"Michael from Mountains" (Intro)	0:29
8.	"Michael from Mountains"	4:01
9.	"Go Tell the Drummer Man"	3:23
10.	"I Don't Know Where I Stand" (Intro)	2:31
11.	"I Don't Know Where I Stand"	3:46

Live at Canterbury House: Ann Arbor, MI (October 27, 1967) – Third Set
No.	Title	Length
12.	"A Melody in Your Name"	4:21
13.	"Carnival in Kenora" (Intro)	2:09
14.	"Carnival in Kenora"	3:52
15.	"Songs to Aging Children Come"	4:01
16.	"Dr. Junk" (Intro)	1:58
17.	"Dr. Junk"	2:36
18.	"Morning Morgantown"	3:40
19.	"Night in the City" (Intro)	0:51
20.	"Night in the City"	3:30
21.	"Both Sides Now"	4:58
22.	"Urge for Going"	5:21

== Personnel ==
Credits adapted from Discogs.

Performers

- Joni Mitchell – vocals; guitar; bass; ukulele

Production and recording

- Barry Bowman – recording
- Bernie Grundman – mastering
- Joni Mitchell – compilation producer
- Patrick Milligan – compilation producer
- J. Robinson – recording
- Thomas Root – recording
- Ed Sciaky – recording

Design

- Joel Bernstein – photography; research
- Al Blixt – photography
- Cameron Crowe – interviewer; liner notes
- Sheryl Farber – supervision
- Lisa Glines – art direction; design
- Edwin C. Lombardo – photography
- Joni Mitchell – cover illustration; interviewee
- Doran Tyson – product manager
- Shannon Ward – packaging manager

== Charts ==
Chart performance for Joni Mitchell Archives – Vol. 1: The Early Years (1963–1967)
Chart (2020)	Peak position
Croatian International Albums (HDU)	21
Scottish Albums (Official Charts)	46
US Americana/Folk Albums (Billboard)	9
US Top Album Sales (Billboard)	38
US Indie Store Album Sales (Billboard)	18
UK Album Sales Chart(OCC)	42

== Highlights ==
Joni Mitchell Archives – Vol. 1: The Early Years (1963–1967): Highlights

Compilation album by Joni Mitchell
- Released: June 12, 2021
- Recorded: 1963–1967
- Label: Rhino Records

Joni Mitchell chronology
Live at Canterbury House – 1967 (2020)	Joni Mitchell Archives – Vol. 1: The Early Years (1963–1967): Highlights (2021)	Blue 50 (Demos & Outtakes) (2021)

A condensed version of Joni Mitchell Archives – Vol. 1: The Early Years (1963–1967), subtitled Highlights, was released on June 12, 2021, by Rhino Records. The sampler album was released exclusively as a vinyl LP for Record Store Day 2021 Drop 1. Highlights is the fourth overall release and second auxiliary release of the Joni Mitchell Archives, and like the album its material is derived from, features a track listing that is in chronological order. The 180-gram vinyl was limited to 5,500 copies in the United States and 15,000 copies worldwide.

=== Track listing ===
Side one
No.	Title	Writer(s)	Length
1.	"House of the Rising Sun" (Radio Station CFQC AM / Saskatoon, Saskatchewan, Canada, ca. 1963)	Woody Guthrie	2:54
2.	"Pastures of Plenty" (Live at the Half Beat / Yorkville, Toronto, Canada, Oct. 21, 1964)	Traditional	2:52
3.	"Seven Daffodils" (Joni's Parents' House / Saskatoon, Saskatchewan, Canada, Feb. 1965)	Fran Moseley, Lee Hays	2:59
4.	"Urge For Going" (Myrtle Anderson Birthday Tape / Detroit, MI, 1965)	Joni Mitchell	4:25
5.	"Day After Day" (Jac Holzman Demo / Detroit, MI, Aug. 24, 1965)	Joni Mitchell	2:10
6.	"The Circle Game" (Live at the 2nd Fret / Philadelphia, PA, Nov. 1966)	Joni Mitchell	5:13

Side two
No.	Title	Writer(s)	Length
1.	"Both Sides Now" (Folklore, WHAT FM / Philadelphia, PA, Mar. 12, 1967)	Joni Mitchell	3:46
2.	"Born to Take the Highway" (Live at the 2nd Fret / Philadelphia, Pennsylvania, Mar. 17, 1967)	Joni Mitchell	4:12
3.	"Blue on Blue" (Folklore, WHAT FM / Philadelphia, PA, Mar. 19, 1967)	Joni Mitchell	2:33
4.	"Strawflower Me" ("A Record Of My Changes" – Michael's Birthday Tape / North Carolina, May 1967)	Joni Mitchell	1:50
5.	"Chelsea Morning" (Home Demo / New York City, NY, ca. June 1967)	Joni Mitchell	2:34
6.	"I Don’t Know Where I Stand" (Live at Canterbury House / Ann Arbor, MI, Oct. 27, 1967)	Joni Mitchell	6:18

=== Charts ===
Chart performance for Joni Mitchell Archives – Volume 1: The Early Years (1963–1967): Highlights
Chart (2021)	Peak position
US Top Album Sales (Billboard)	37
US Americana/Folk Albums (Billboard)	6
US Indie Store Album Sales (Billboard)	18
Scottish Albums (Official Charts)	92
