= Live at Canterbury House – 1967 =

Live album by Joni Mitchell
- Released: October 30, 2020
- Recorded: October 27, 1967
- Venue: Canterbury House (Ann Arbor, Michigan)
- Label: Rhino Records

Joni Mitchell chronology
Early Joni – 1963 (2020)	Live at Canterbury House – 1967 (2020)	Joni Mitchell Archives – Vol. 1: The Early Years (1963–1967): Highlights (2021)

Live at Canterbury House – 1967 is a live album by singer-songwriter Joni Mitchell, released on October 30, 2020, by Rhino Records. The album, which is the third overall release and the first live release of the Joni Mitchell Archives, features a three-set recording from the Canterbury House student missionary in Ann Arbor, Michigan, on October 27, 1967. The recordings were released on vinyl and on the box set Joni Mitchell Archives – Vol. 1: The Early Years (1963–1967).

== Background and recording ==
Joni Mitchell Archives – Vol. 1: The Early Years (1963–1967) contains a number of recordings from Mitchell's personal archive, including an expansive, three-set recording captured at Canterbury House, the Episcopal campus ministry in Ann Arbor, Michigan, in 1967. The Canterbury House recording made headlines when it was unearthed with lost Neil Young recordings in 2018 by the Michigan History Project. Young ended up being a consultant during the assemblage of the Archive Collection's inaugural release, having had experience with the release of his own extensive archival series, though the project was ultimately spearheaded by Mitchell and Young's late manager Elliot Roberts, who died during the process of planning the release, and to whom the release is dedicated. Planning for the release continued throughout the COVID-19 pandemic, with in-person meetings between Mitchell and label personnel transitioning to telephone and video calls.

== Track listing ==
Side one – first set
No.	Title	Length
1.	"Conversation"	5:24
2.	"Come to the Sunshine" (Intro)	0:19
3.	"Come to the Sunshine"	3:01
4.	"Chelsea Morning" (Intro)	0:55
5.	"Chelsea Morning"	2:51
6.	"Gift of the Magi" (Intro)	1:15
7.	"Gift of the Magi"	4:23

Side two – first set (cont.)
No.	Title	Length
1.	"Play Little David"	3:31
2.	"The Dowie Dens of Yarrow" (Intro)	0:42
3.	"The Dowie Dens of Yarrow"	3:22
4.	"I Had a King"	4:12
5.	"Free Darling" (Intro)	0:22
6.	"Free Darling"	2:33
7.	"Cactus Tree" (Intro)	1:51
8.	"Cactus Tree"	4:57

Side three – second set
No.	Title	Length
1.	"Little Green"	4:06
2.	"Marcie" (Intro)	2:27
3.	"Marcie"	4:48
4.	"Ballerina Valerie" (Intro)	1:32
5.	"Ballerina Valerie"	1:56
6.	"The Circle Game"	4:51

Side four – second set (cont.)
No.	Title	Length
1.	"Michael from Mountains" (Intro)	0:27
2.	"Michael from Mountains"	4:03
3.	"Go Tell the Drummer Man"	3:24
4.	"I Don't Know Where I Stand" (Intro)	2:31
5.	"I Don't Know Where I Stand"	3:45

Side five – third set
No.	Title	Length
1.	"A Melody in Your Name"	4:22
2.	"Carnival in Kenora" (Intro)	2:09
3.	"Carnival in Kenora"	3:53
4.	"Songs to Aging Children Come"	4:01
5.	"Dr. Junk" (Intro)	1:58
6.	"Dr. Junk"	2:36

Side six – third set (cont.)
No.	Title	Length
1.	"Morning Morgantown"	3:42
2.	"Night in the City" (Intro)	0:51
3.	"Night in the City"	3:31
4.	"Both Sides Now"	4:58
5.	"Urge for Going"	5:21

== Personnel ==
Credits adapted from Discogs.

Performers

- Joni Mitchell – vocals, guitar

Production and recording

- Joel Bernstein – project assistance
- Allison Boron – project assistance
- Barry Bowman – recording
- David Braun – project assistance
- John Chester – project assistance
- Marcy Gensic – project assistance
- Alan Glenn – project assistance
- Bernie Grundman – mastering; lacquer cutting
- Jamie Howarth – project assistance
- Brian Kehew – project assistance
- Michigan History Society - project consultation
- Joni Mitchell – reissue producer
- Patrick Milligan – reissue producer
- Plangent Processes – magnetic tape transfer and processing
- Jane Tani – project assistance

Design

- Al Blixt – photography
- Barry Bowman – liner notes
- Sheryl Farber – booklet editor
- Lisa Glines – art direction; design
- Doran Tyson – product manager
- Shannon Ward – packaging manager

== Charts ==
Chart performance for Live at Canterbury House – 1967
Chart (2020)	Peak position
US Top Current Albums (Billboard)	94
US Folk Albums (Billboard)	20
