= Mingus (Joni Mitchell album) =

Studio album by Joni Mitchell
- Released: June 13, 1979
- Recorded: 1978–1979
- Studios: A&M (Hollywood); Electric Lady (New York City)
- Genre: Jazz fusion
- Length: 37:20
- Label: Asylum
- Producer: Joni Mitchell

Joni Mitchell chronology
Don Juan's Reckless Daughter (1977)	Mingus (1979)	Shadows and Light (1980)

Singles from Mingus
- 1. "The Dry Cleaner from Des Moines" Released: July 1979

"God Must Be a Boogie Man"
from Mingus by Joni Mitchell, Asylum Records, 1979. Sample from Mingus Asylum Records/Elektra Entertainment Group, 1979

Mingus is the tenth studio album by Canadian musician Joni Mitchell. It was released on June 13, 1979, and was her last studio album for Asylum Records. The album is a collaboration between Mitchell and jazz musician Charles Mingus. It was recorded in the months before and after Mingus' death in January 1979 and is wholly dedicated to him.

The album is one of Mitchell's most experimental and jazz-centric works. Mingus wrote six new compositions ("Joni I-VI") for Mitchell to write lyrics for, three of which were included on the album. Two other tracks written exclusively by Mitchell are included, alongside a new version of Mingus' standard "Goodbye Pork Pie Hat", featuring lyrics written by Mitchell. There are also spoken word tracks (denoted as "raps") dispersed throughout the album. Mingus had earlier in his career been known as a virtuoso bassist, but by the time of these recording sessions was in the final states of Amyotrophic lateral sclerosis and not able to perform.

Mitchell sings and plays guitar, and is backed on the album by bassist Jaco Pastorius, Wayne Shorter on saxophone, Herbie Hancock on electric piano, Peter Erskine on drums, and Emil Richards and Don Alias on percussion. Mingus received mixed-to-positive reviews from critics and peaked at number 17 in the US. "The Dry Cleaner from Des Moines" was released as a single to promote the album, but did not chart. Mitchell would tour to promote the album through 1979–80; performances from these concerts would be documented on the live album Shadows and Light (1980).

== Critical reception ==
Professional ratings
Review scores
Source	Rating
AllMusic	3.5/5 stars
Christgau's Record Guide	C+
The Encyclopedia of Popular Music	4/5 stars
Pitchfork	5.5/10
The Rolling Stone Album Guide	3/5 stars
DownBeat	5/5 stars
Jazz Forum	4/5 stars

The Globe and Mail wrote that "the melodies have a little wider range and a more legitimate jazz feeling to them than Mitchell could compose, but given Mitchell's peculiar vocal talent, what started out Mingus ended up sounding just like Joni Mitchell, moving forward once again into new territory."

DownBeat gave the album 5 stars. Neil Tesser called the album "a wonderful piece of work". He pointed out that, "On four of the songs, the late bassist supplied the music and Joni wrote the lyrics; her words for the improvisatory, often nonstrophic melodies make this the first real advance in the jazz art of vocalese since Lambert, Hendricks & Ross". He remarked, "Joni Mitchell can perform as a credible, and here excellent, jazz singer". He called "Porkpie Hat" a masterpiece, "Joni’s lyrics, quite frankly, are profound: in the first five words, she manages to weave the song’s original subject (Lester Young) and its composer into an epic framework of great emotional power".

== Track listing ==
All tracks are written by Joni Mitchell, except where noted.

Side one
No.	Title	Lyrics	Music	Length
1.	"Happy Birthday 1975" (Rap)	—	Mildred J. Hill	0:57
2.	"God Must Be a Boogie Man"			4:35
3.	"Funeral" (Rap)	—	—	1:07
4.	"A Chair in the Sky"		Charles Mingus	6:42
5.	"The Wolf That Lives in Lindsey"			6:35

Side two
No.	Title	Lyrics	Music	Length
1.	"I's a Muggin'" (Rap)	Stuff Smith	Smith	0:07
2.	"Sweet Sucker Dance"		Mingus	8:04
3.	"Coin in the Pocket" (Rap)	—	—	0:11
4.	"The Dry Cleaner from Des Moines"		Mingus	3:21
5.	"Lucky" (Rap)	—	—	0:03
6.	"Goodbye Pork Pie Hat"		Mingus	5:37

== Personnel ==
=== Musicians ===
Prior to recording the album, Mitchell had several "experimental sessions" with New York musicians who had worked with Mingus. These musicians included:

- Eddie Gómez – bass
- John Guerin – drums
- Phil Woods – alto saxophone
- Gerry Mulligan – baritone saxophone
- Dannie Richmond – narration
- Tony Williams – drums
- John McLaughlin – guitar
- Jan Hammer – mini Moog
- Stanley Clarke – bass

The recordings of the "experimental sessions", rumored to have been lost, destroyed, or otherwise made unavailable, have become available as bootleg tapes.

The personnel on the actual album were:

- Joni Mitchell – guitar, vocals
- Jaco Pastorius – bass; horn arrangement on "The Dry Cleaner from Des Moines"
- Wayne Shorter – soprano saxophone
- Herbie Hancock – electric piano
- Peter Erskine – drums
- Don Alias – congas
- Emil Richards – percussion
- Wolves – howling on "The Wolf That Lives in Lindsay"

=== Technical ===
Mixed by Joni Mitchell, Henry Lewy and Steve Katz
Mastered by Bernie Grundman
Personal Management: Elliot Roberts
Paintings by Joni Mitchell
Art direction: Glen Christensen

Recorded at A&M Studios in Hollywood by Henry Lewy and Steve Katz
Additional recordings at Electric Lady Studios, New York by Henry Lewy and Jerry Solomon

== Charts ==
Chart performance for Mingus
Chart (1979)	Peak position
Australian Albums (Kent Music Report)	44
Canada Top Albums/CDs (RPM)	37
New Zealand Albums (RMNZ)	27
Swedish Albums (Sverigetopplistan)	48
UK Albums (Official Charts)	24
US Billboard 200	17
US Cash Box Top 100 Albums	19

Chart (2024)	Peak position
Hungarian Physical Albums (MAHASZ)	28

== See also ==
- River: The Joni Letters
