= The Fiddle and the Drum =

Song by Joni Mitchell

from the album Clouds
- Language: English
- Released: 1969
- Recorded: A&M Studios, Hollywood, CA
- Genre: Folk rock
- Length: 2:50
- Label: Reprise
- Songwriter: Joni Mitchell
- Producers: Joni Mitchell, Paul A. Rothchild

"The Fiddle and the Drum" is a song by Canadian singer-songwriter Joni Mitchell; it was first recorded by Mitchell on her 1969 album Clouds. It was one of the songs performed by Mitchell on The Dick Cavett Show on August 19, 1969, when Mitchell appeared with some of the performers from Woodstock.

The song's lyrics lament, from the position of an outsider, that America is "fighting us all" and has "[traded] the fiddle for the drum"; however, the singer can "remember/All the good things you are" and asks "Can we help you find the peace and the star?" As an anti-war song, it was one of the songs that became associated with opposition to the Iraq War; in particular, through the 2004 cover by A Perfect Circle.

The song provided the title for the 2007 ballet The Fiddle and the Drum which Mitchell authored with Jean Grand-Maître, the artistic director of the Alberta Ballet Company. The ballet was filmed for an hour-long 2007 film with the same title.

== Covers ==
The song has been covered a number of times:

- 1983 - June Tabor on her album Abyssinians.
- 2003 - Danilo Perez with lead vocals by Lizz Wright on his album ...Till Then.
- 2004 - A Perfect Circle on their album eMOTIVe.
- 2007 - The Spooky Men's Chorale on their album Stop Scratching It.
- 2008 - Karan Casey on her album Ships in the Forest.
- 2008 - Maureen McGovern on her album A Long and Winding Road.
- 2020 - Canadian rock singer Lee Aaron covered the song for her holiday album Almost Christmas.
- 2021 - Amanda Tosoff with vocals by Lydia Persaud on her album Earth Voices.
- 2026 - Renée Fleming and Béla Fleck (featuring Jerry Douglas) on their album 'The Fiddle and the Drum'

== See also ==
- List of anti-war songs
