= The Last Time I Saw Richard =

Song by Joni Mitchell

from the album Blue
- Released: 1971
- Recorded: 1971
- Genre: Folk
- Length: 4:13
- Label: Reprise
- Songwriter: Joni Mitchell
- Producer: Joni Mitchell

"The Last Time I Saw Richard" is a song by Joni Mitchell from her 1971 album Blue. It is the last track on the album.

Contrary to rumours regarding the song being about Mitchell's first husband Charles Scott "Chuck" Mitchell, she has said it was inspired by a conversation with fellow folk singer Patrick Sky, in which he told her "Oh, Joni, you're a hopeless romantic. There's only one way for you to go. Hopeless cynicism."

In October 2015 the song was included in "Joni Mitchell: 20 essential songs" by The Daily Telegraph which said "One of the two greatest songs on Blue and most enduring and beloved songs of Mitchell’s entire canon, 'The Last Time I Saw Richard' is surely among the most poignant songs about romantic disillusionment ever written, in which a former lover’s fate is delineated with a devastating precision. 'Richard got married to a figure skater/ And he bought her a dishwasher and a coffee percolator /And he drinks at home now most nights with the TV on /And all the house lights left up bright.'"
