= You Turn Me On, I'm a Radio =

1972 single by Joni Mitchell

Single by Joni Mitchell

from the album For the Roses
- B-side: "Urge for Going"
- Released: October 1972
- Recorded: 1972
- Studio: A&M (Hollywood, California)
- Genre: Folk-pop
- Length: 2:39
- Label: Asylum
- Songwriter: Joni Mitchell
- Producer: Joni Mitchell

Joni Mitchell singles chronology
"California" (1971)	"You Turn Me On, I'm a Radio" (1972)	"Cold Blue Steel and Sweet Fire" (1973)

"You Turn Me On, I'm a Radio" is a 1972 song written and originally recorded by Canadian singer songwriter Joni Mitchell. It was released on her fifth studio album, For the Roses, and was issued as a single as well.

== Background ==
Joni Mitchell originally wrote the song in response to her record label's desire for her to write a hit song. The song was recorded in preparation for Mitchell's then-upcoming fifth studio album in Hollywood, California at A&M Studios. Although Graham Nash, David Crosby, and Neil Young all contributed to the recording session for the song, only the harmonica piece performed by Graham Nash was included on the official release.

"You Turn Me On, I'm a Radio" was released as a single in November 1972 via Asylum Records. The song became Mitchell's first top-ten hit in Canada, reaching the tenth position on the RPM Top Singles chart. Additionally, the single became her first top-forty hit in the United States, reaching number twenty-five on the Billboard Hot 100. Outside North America, "You Turn Me On, I'm a Radio" peaked within the top forty on the Australian Kent Music Report chart. The single was included on Mitchell's fifth studio effort For the Roses, which was issued in November 1972.

Record World said it has a "sensational lyric" and that "Ms. Mitchell again captures love in her unique fashion."

== Chart performance ==
Chart (1972–1973)	Peak position
Australia Top 100 Singles (Kent Music Report)	37
Canada Top Singles (RPM)	10
Canada Adult Contemporary Songs (RPM)	3
Quebec (ADISQ)	33
US Billboard Hot 100	25
US Cashbox Top 100	20
US Hot Adult Contemporary Tracks (Billboard)	13

== "Urge for Going" ==
The single features the only non-album B-side of Mitchell's career, a song originally recorded by Tom Rush that features on his 1968 album The Circle Game. Mitchell had performed the song since at least 1966 and was inspired by her hometown of Saskatoon. The Mitchell version remained unreleased on LP until her 1996 compilation album Hits.

== Other Joni Mitchell recordings ==
The opening track on her 1974 live album Miles of Aisles is a performance with an extended outro in which she wordlessly duets with Robben Ford's electric guitar.

The 2023 compilation Joni Mitchell Archives – Vol. 3: The Asylum Years (1972–1975) includes a version from the For the Roses early recording sessions in April 1972, credited "with Neil Young and the Stray Gators".

== Gail Davies version ==
"You Turn Me On, I'm a Radio"

Single by Gail Davies

from the album Givin' Herself Away
- B-side: "All the Fire Is Gone"
- Released: June 1982
- Recorded: July 1981
- Studio: Hollywood, California
- Genre: Country
- Length: 4:49
- Label: Warner Bros. Nashville
- Songwriter: Joni Mitchell
- Producer: Gail Davies

Gail Davies singles chronology
"Round the Clock Lovin'" (1982)	"You Turn Me On, I'm a Radio" (1982)	"Hold On" (1982)

Among numerous cover versions, American country artist Gail Davies released her version of "You Turn Me On, I'm a Radio" as a single in 1982. Davies befriended Joni Mitchell during the early 1970s after becoming a session musician for A&M Records in California. As a tribute to Mitchell, Davies decided to record the song. Following the single's release to radio, Davies was congratulated by both Mitchell and Henry Lewy. Lewy was responsible for introducing Davies to the self-production of her own recordings. The song was recorded at the "Producer's Workshop" in Hollywood, California, United States in July 1982. It was produced entirely by Davies in preparation for her fourth studio record Givin' Herself Away.

"You Turn Me On, I'm a Radio" was released as a single via Warner Bros. Records in June 1982. The song reached the seventeenth position on the Billboard Hot Country Singles chart in 1982. It became her seventh top-twenty hit on the country singles chart and her second from her fourth studio album. Additionally, the single peaked at number seven on the Canadian RPM Country Singles chart, becoming her second top-ten single on that chart.

== Reception ==
Cash Box commented on the song's "interesting lyrical content."

=== Chart performance ===
Chart (1982)	Peak position
Canada Country Songs (RPM)	7
US Hot Country Singles (Billboard)	17
