= Early Joni – 1963 =

Compilation album by Joni Mitchell
- Released: October 30, 2020
- Recorded: 1963
- Studio: CFQC (Saskatoon, Canada)
- Label: Rhino Records

Joni Mitchell chronology
Joni Mitchell Archives – Vol. 1: The Early Years (1963–1967) (2020)	Early Joni – 1963 (2020)	Live at Canterbury House – 1967 (2020)

Early Joni – 1963 is a compilation album by singer-songwriter Joni Mitchell, released on October 30, 2020, by Rhino Records. The album, which is the second overall and the first auxiliary release of the Joni Mitchell Archives, features one of Mitchell's first live performances, a broadcast set on Saskatoon radio station CFQC AM. The cover art for the release features a self portrait drawn by Mitchell that is based on an early photo in her personal archive, and marks the first visual artwork that she had completed in several years. This separate title was pressed exclusively on vinyl, though it serves as a companion to Joni Mitchell Archives – Vol. 1: The Early Years (1963–1967). Early Joni - 1963 replicates the first nine songs from Disc 1 from that box set.

== Background and recording ==
In 1963, now-retired radio DJ Barry Bowman of CFQC 600 lived with three of his friends in downtown Saskatoon, Canada. During that summer, Bowman and his friends met and befriended Joni Mitchell, who at the time was still going by her birth name of Joni Anderson. The group would frequently congregate with Mitchell at the large house they were renting, the local swimming pool, or the South Saskatchewan River, where they "drank beer and ate hot dogs." One of Bowman's friends and co-tenants, Danny Evanishen, referred to that period of time as being "the summer that Joni came to [them]." Evanishen is also attributed as being the person who encouraged Mitchell to take up playing the guitar, loaning her his guitar to play in lieu of her ukulele. Encouraged by Mitchell's budding talent, Bowman invited her to the radio station to record nine traditional folk songs over the course of two nights. He gave her a copy of the audition tape and kept the masters, which were later unearthed by his ex-wife in 2015.

== Track listing ==
Side one
No.	Title	Writer(s)	Length
1.	"House of the Rising Sun"	Traditional	2:54
2.	"John Hardy"	Traditional	2:25
3.	"Dark as a Dungeon"	Merle Travis	3:07
4.	"Tell Old Bill"	Traditional	3:00
5.	"Nancy Whiskey"	Traditional	3:23

Side two
No.	Title	Writer(s)	Length
1.	"Anathea"	Traditional	4:10
2.	"Copper Kettle"	Albert Frank Beddoe	2:18
3.	"Fare Thee Well (Dink's Song)"	Traditional	2:48
4.	"Molly Malone"	Traditional	2:46

== Personnel ==
Credits adapted from Discogs.

Performers

- Joni Mitchell – vocals; guitar

Production and recording

- Allison Boron – project assistance
- Barry Bowman – recording
- Marcy Gensic – project assistance
- Bernie Grundman – mastering; lacquer cutting
- Joni Mitchell – reissue producer
- Patrick Milligan – reissue producer
- Jane Tani – project assistance

Design

- Barry Bowman – liner notes
- Sheryl Farber – booklet editor
- Lisa Glines – art direction; design
- Joni Mitchell – cover illustration
- Doran Tyson – product manager
- Shannon Ward – packaging manager

== Charts ==
Chart performance for Early Joni – 1963
Chart (2020)	Peak position
US Top Current Albums (Billboard)	72
