= Little Green (song) =

Song by Joni Mitchell

from the album Blue
- Released: 1971
- Genre: Folk rock
- Length: 3:25
- Label: Reprise
- Songwriter(s): Joni Mitchell
- Producer(s): Joni Mitchell

Official audio
- "Little Green " on YouTube

"Little Green" is a song composed and performed by Joni Mitchell. It is the third track on her 1971 album Blue.

== Background ==
Mitchell wrote "Little Green" in 1966, shortly after she had signed the papers to place her daughter for adoption the previous year, while she was a poor folk singer in Toronto.

The existence of her daughter, originally called Kelly Dale, was not publicly known until 1993, when a roommate from Mitchell's art school days in the 1960s sold the story of the adoption to a tabloid magazine. However, in at least one early live performance, she mentioned her daughter’s given first name. At the Café Au Go Go in New York in 1967, there was (a reviewer later stated) "a raw, husky catch to her tender wishes for 'Kelly Green'" during the song.

Mitchell commented on the situation in an interview quoted in a 1998 article: "I was dirt poor. An unhappy mother does not raise a happy child. It was difficult parting with the child, but I had to let her go." Mitchell was reunited with her daughter, Kilauren Gibb, in 1997.

The guitar tuning Mitchell uses on the song is Open G (low-to-high: D G D G B D).

== Critical reaction ==
Writing for Rolling Stone in 1971, Timothy Crouse, said:

Several of the lesser cuts on Blue give every indication of having sat in Joni's trunk for some time. The folkie melody of "Little Green" recalls "I Don't Know Where I Stand" from her second album. The pretty, "poetic" lyric is dressed up in such cryptic references that it passeth all understanding.

Reflecting on the song for The Atlantic in 2013, Jack Hamilton noted that "Little Green", arguably the most personal song on Blue, was not written about a lover but rather about Mitchell's daughter, concluding that "Blue was Mitchell's way into music that transcended her life to become about yours and everyone else's."

Bob Dylan played the song on the "Colors" episode of Season 1 of his Theme Time Radio Hour show in 2007.
