= In France They Kiss on Main Street =

Single by Joni Mitchell

from the album The Hissing of Summer Lawns
- B-side: "The Boho Dance"
- Released: 1976
- Studio: A&M (Hollywood, California)
- Length: 3:19
- Label: Asylum
- Songwriter: Joni Mitchell
- Producer: Joni Mitchell

Joni Mitchell singles chronology
"Carey (live)" (1974)	"In France They Kiss on Main Street" (1976)	"Coyote" (1977)

Official audio
- "In France They Kiss on Main Street" on YouTube

"In France They Kiss on Main Street" is a song by Canadian singer-songwriter Joni Mitchell from the album The Hissing of Summer Lawns. It was released as a single in 1976 and reached number 66 on the Billboard Hot 100. Despite the title referring to kissing in France, the song actually tells a story of young romance and coming of age in the 1950s in North America.

It features David Crosby, Graham Nash, and James Taylor on backing vocals, and Jeff "Skunk" Baxter on guitar. Cash Box said that "Joni Mitchell has distilled the essence of romance and spread it liberally through the grooves of this single." Record World called it "an exquisitely textured tune" that has "all the grace and vocal finesse that contributed to the widespread success of 'Free Man.'" The song is played in DAEGAD tuning with a capo on the second fret. An animated music video for the song was created, played on The Old Grey Whistle Test.

== Personnel ==
Personnel taken from Joni Mitchell's website.

- Joni Mitchell – vocals, acoustic guitar
- Victor Feldman – electric piano
- Max Bennett – bass guitar
- John Guerin – drums
- Robben Ford – electric guitar
- Jeff “Skunk” Baxter – electric guitar
- James Taylor – backing vocals
- David Crosby – backing vocals
- Graham Nash – backing vocals

== Charts ==
Chart performance for "In France They Kiss on Main Street"
Chart (1976)	Peak position
Canada Top Singles (RPM)	19
Canada Adult Contemporary (RPM)	33
US Billboard Hot 100	66
US Adult Contemporary (Billboard)	32
US Cash Box Top 100	55
