= Chelsea Morning =

Song written and performed by Joni Mitchell

Song by Joni Mitchell

from the album Clouds
- Language: English
- Released: 1969
- Studio: A&M Studios, Hollywood, California
- Genre: Folk rock
- Length: 2:35
- Label: Reprise
- Songwriter: Joni Mitchell
- Producers: Joni Mitchell, Paul A. Rothchild

Official audio
- Chelsea Morning on YouTube

"Chelsea Morning" is a song written and composed by Joni Mitchell and recorded for the singer's second album, Clouds, which she released in 1969.

== Background ==
The song was inspired by Mitchell's room in the Chelsea neighborhood of New York City. The inspiration for the first verse comes partly from the distinct décor of her apartment. While in Philadelphia, Mitchell and friends had made a mobile from shards of colored glass they had found in the street and wire coat hangers, which filtered the light coming into her room through the window and created the "rainbow on the wall." During coffeehouse performances of this song in the late 1960s, Mitchell explained that the stained glass had been rescued from the salvaged windows of a demolished home for unwed mothers.

The lyrics of this song demonstrate Mitchell's talent with imagery, and her strong use of visual inspiration, which comes from her background in visual art. Example: "The sun poured in like butterscotch and stuck to all my senses." Mitchell explained in 1996: "It was a very young and lovely time ... before I had a record deal. I think it's a very sweet song, but I don't think of it as part of my best work. To me, most of those early songs seem like the work of an ingenue."

"Chelsea Morning" predated the release of Mitchell's 1968 debut album, but she held off recording the song until her second album Clouds partly because it had already been recorded by other artists. The version by Judy Collins had been initially slated for Who Knows Where the Time Goes, but "Chelsea Morning" did not make the track listing for the album, instead given an April 1969 single release. Supported mainly by easy listening radio, the track reached No.25 on Billboard's Easy Listening chart with peripheral Billboard Hot 100 impact, peaking there at No.78, and No. 72 in Canada. "Chelsea Morning" made a belated debut as a Judy Collins album track on the singer's 1971 album release Living. Collins re-recorded "Chelsea Morning" for her 1999 retrospective double-album release Forever: An Anthology.

Chelsea Clinton, daughter of President Bill Clinton and Hillary Clinton, was named after the song, "Chelsea Morning", after the couple heard Judy Collins' version of the song playing during a stroll in the Chelsea neighborhood of London.

== Other versions ==
"Chelsea Morning"

Single by Judy Collins
- B-side: "Pretty Polly"
- Released: April 1969
- Recorded: Elektra Sound Recorders, Los Angeles, 1968
- Genre: Folk rock
- Length: 3:15
- Label: Elektra
- Songwriter: Joni Mitchell
- Producer: David Anderle

Judy Collins singles chronology
| "Someday Soon" (1969) | "Chelsea Morning" (1969) | "Turn! Turn! Turn! To Everything There Is A Season" (1969) |

Prior to coming out on the Mitchell album, the song had been issued as a track on the debut album by Fairport Convention in 1968, as a single by Gloria Loring, and as a single by Judy Collins earlier in 1969. Jennifer Warnes recorded it for her debut album, I Can See Everything, also in 1968, and, in 1969, this version was released as a single. The earliest commercial appearance of the song, however, was likely its interpretation by Dave Van Ronk on his 1967 album Dave Van Ronk and the Hudson Dusters.

In 1970, three versions of "Chelsea Morning" were produced:

- Green Lyte Sunday featuring Susan Darby reached No.4 as Easy Listening in Billboard in August 1970.
- Sérgio Mendes & Brasil '66 reached No.21 as Easy Listening in Billboard in November 1970. In Canada it reached No.7 on the AC charts and No. 74 on the rock charts.
- Sylvia McNeill on RCA 1922 (UK 45 rpm) produced by Jack Good, is another notable version.

In 1971, Neil Diamond recorded "Chelsea Morning" for his album Stones. (He had previously interpreted "Both Sides Now" in a performance at Douglas Weston's Troubadour which had been recorded on his live album Gold.)

In 1972, a Finnish rendering, titled "Kaupungin Aamu", was recorded by Anki for her album Ennen Aurinkoa.

In 1974, Kjell Hansson recorded the Swedish rendering "Skärgårdsmorgon" for his album Dig.

In 1985, Mitchell's version was included in the soundtrack of the feature film After Hours.

In 2004, Rebecca Luker recorded "Chelsea Morning" for her album Leaving Home.

Marian Call recorded it for her 2007 album, Vanilla.

Judy Collins re-recorded "Chelsea Morning" for her 2021 album White Bird: Anthology of Favorites.
