= Song to a Seagull =

1968 studio album by Joni Mitchell

Studio album by Joni Mitchell
- Released: March 23, 1968
- Recorded: Early 1968
- Studio: Sunset Sound Recorders, Hollywood, California
- Genre: Folk
- Length: 38:11
- Label: Reprise
- Producer: David Crosby

Joni Mitchell chronology
Song to a Seagull (1968)	Clouds (1969)

Singles from Song to a Seagull
- 1. "Night in the City" Released: June 1968

Professional ratings
Review scores
Source	Rating
AllMusic	3/5 stars
Encyclopedia of Popular Music	3/5 stars
MusicHound	3/5 stars
Pitchfork	6.7/10
Rolling Stone	3/5 stars

Song to a Seagull (also known as Joni Mitchell) is the debut studio album by the Canadian singer-songwriter Joni Mitchell. Produced by David Crosby, the album was recorded at Sunset Sound and released in March 1968 by Reprise Records.

== Production ==
The album was recorded at Sunset Sound in Hollywood, California. David Crosby was assigned as producer as part of the deal with Reprise Records, following meeting Mitchell in October 1967. Crosby wanted Mitchell to sound pure and natural, so he asked her to sing into the studio grand piano, and set up extra microphones to capture her voice reverberating off the strings; unfortunately the set-up captured too much ambient noise, resulting in excessive tape hiss, which could only be removed post-production at the cost of the high sounds in the audio range, which gives the album a flat feel.

Mitchell had written songs that were hits for other artists (e.g., "Both Sides Now" and "Chelsea Morning" by Judy Collins and Dave Van Ronk, "Eastern Rain" by Fairport Convention, "Urge for Going" and "The Circle Game" by Tom Rush), but none of these songs were selected for inclusion on Song to a Seagull.

== Content ==
Mitchell has said that "Sisotowbell" stands for "Somehow, in spite of trouble, ours will be ever lasting love".

Record World said of the single "Night in the City" that "The marvelous Joni Mitchell lights up the imagination with this provocative rock."

The album was dedicated to her Grade 7 English teacher, "Mr. Kratzmann, who taught me to love words".

== Release ==
This album was originally released as Joni Mitchell because the LP album covers were printed incorrectly, cutting off part of the Song to a Seagull title (spelled out by birds in flight). The cut-off, as well as the publishers at Reprise Records not noticing that the birds spelled out the album name, caused the eponymous album title.

The two sides of the LP were labelled as Part 1 – "I Came to the City", and Part 2 – "Out of the City and Down to the Seaside".

On April 8, 2021, Rhino Entertainment, the catalog arm of Warner Music Group, announced that a new mix of the album overseen by Mitchell and mixer Matt Lee would be released on June 25, 2021 as part of a special remaster collection comprising the singer's first four albums. Commenting on the quality of the original mix, Mitchell called it "atrocious" and said it "sounded like it was recorded under a Jello bowl". The remastered collection is part of the ongoing Joni Mitchell Archives project.

== Track listing ==
All tracks are written by Joni Mitchell.

Side one – I Came to the City
No.	Title	Length
1.	"I Had a King"	3:37
2.	"Michael from Mountains"	3:41
3.	"Night in the City"	2:30
4.	"Marcie"	4:35
5.	"Nathan La Franeer"	3:18

Side two – Out of the City and Down to the Seaside
No.	Title	Length
1.	"Sisotowbell Lane"	4:05
2.	"The Dawntreader"	5:04
3.	"The Pirate of Penance"	2:44
4.	"Song to a Seagull"	3:51
5.	"Cactus Tree"	4:35

== Personnel ==
- Joni Mitchell – guitar, piano, vocals, album cover, banshee
- Stephen Stills – bass on "Night in the City"
- Lee Keefer – banshee

Technical

- David Crosby – producer
- Art Crist – engineer
- Ed Thrasher – art direction

== Charts ==
Chart performance for Song to a Seagull
Chart (1968)	Peak position
US Billboard 200	189
US Cash Box Top 100 Albums	88

== Other versions and covers ==
Cass Elliot covered two songs from the album: "Sisotowbell Lane" and "I Had a King". Elliot sang "I Had a King" "live" on Andy Williams's Kaleidoscope in 1968. Neither song has ever been released on any of Elliot's seven albums. "Sisotowbell Lane" can be found on the CD compilation The Complete Solo Collection – 1968–71, released in 2005.

Judy Collins covered "Michael from Mountains" on her LP Wildflowers, as did Gábor Szabó on his LP 1969. Buffy Sainte-Marie recorded "Song to a Seagull" on her album Fire & Fleet & Candlelight issued in 1967.
