= Ladies of the Canyon (album) =

Studio album by Joni Mitchell
- Released: April 6, 1970
- Recorded: 1969–1970
- Studio: A&M (Los Angeles)
- Genres: Folk rock; folk
- Length: 45:03
- Labels: Reprise; Warner Bros.
- Producer: Joni Mitchell

Joni Mitchell chronology
Clouds (1969)	Ladies of the Canyon (1970)	Blue (1971)

Singles from Ladies of the Canyon
- 1. "Big Yellow Taxi" Released: July 1970

Professional ratings
Review scores
Source	Rating
AllMusic	4.5/5 stars
Christgau's Record Guide	A−
Encyclopedia of Popular Music	4/5 stars
MusicHound Rock	4/5
Music Story	4/5 stars
Pitchfork	7.8/10
Rolling Stone	(not rated)
The Rolling Stone Album Guide	4/5 stars

Ladies of the Canyon is the third studio album by the Canadian singer-songwriter Joni Mitchell, released on Reprise Records in 1970. It peaked at No. 27 on the Billboard 200, and has been certified platinum by the RIAA. The title makes reference to Laurel Canyon, a center of popular music culture in Los Angeles during the 1960s, where Mitchell lived while she was writing the album. Specifically, Mitchell lived and wrote at 8217 Lookout Mountain Avenue, the house which is the subject of Graham Nash's "Our House". The album includes several of Mitchell's most noted songs, such as "Big Yellow Taxi", "Woodstock" and "The Circle Game".

== Album content ==
The album is notable for its expansion of Mitchell's artistic vision and its varied song topics (ranging from the aesthetic weight of celebrity, to observation of the Woodstock generation, to the complexities of love). Ladies of the Canyon is often viewed as a transition between Mitchell's folky earlier work and the more sophisticated, poignant albums that were to follow. In particular, "For Free" foreshadows the lyrical leitmotif of the isolation triggered by success that would be elaborated upon in For the Roses and Court and Spark. The sparse, alternative-tuning laden sound of later records comes to the forefront on "Ladies of the Canyon".

Of all of Mitchell's work, this album is the most related to her long-standing friendships and relationships with Crosby, Stills, Nash, & Young (whose rock arrangement of "Woodstock" was one of their four radio hits in 1970). Mitchell was living with Graham Nash at the time much of the album was written. A number of the album's songs, including the aforementioned "Ladies of the Canyon" and "Woodstock", feature densely stacked, wordless harmony overdubs reminiscent of David Crosby's oeuvre; Crosby himself performed "For Free" for many years. "The Circle Game", one of the artist's early signature songs, features background vocals from all four.

== Critical reception ==
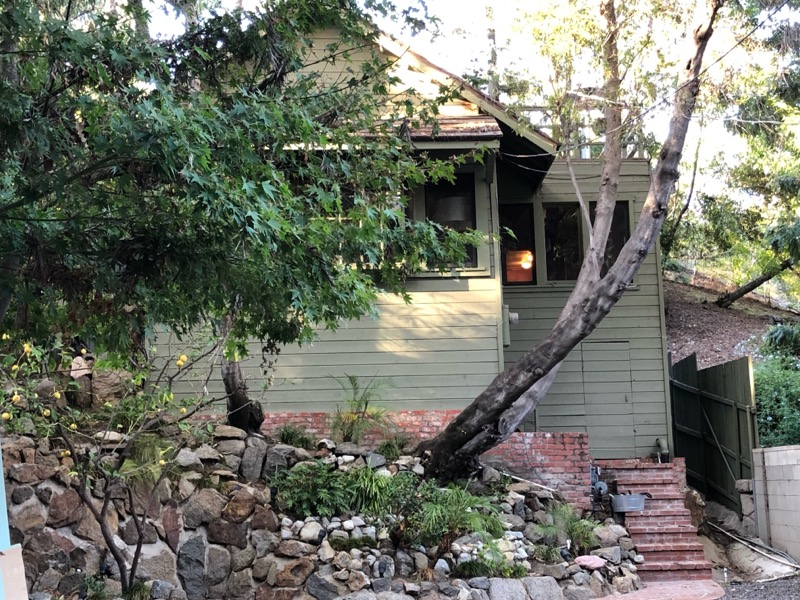
Laurel Canyon, 8217 Lookout Mountain Avenue, Joni Mitchell's house from 1969 to 1974; photograph taken in 2022

Reviewing for The Village Voice in 1970, Robert Christgau found Ladies of the Canyon "superior to her previous work, richer lyrically and more compelling musically." He said the album's second half is "almost perfect, and the arrangements are intelligent throughout", but found Mitchell's voice weak and her wordplay inconsistent. Years later in Christgau's Record Guide: Rock Albums of the Seventies (1981), he said that, despite the occasional "laughably high school" wordplay, Mitchell's reliance on piano suggests "a move from the open air to the drawing room ... that's reflected in richer, more sophisticated songs." In 2000 it was voted number 731 in Colin Larkin's All Time Top 1000 Albums.

== Legacy ==
"Big Yellow Taxi" has become a standard over the years, and it was sampled by Janet Jackson. It has been used repeatedly to call attention to environmental injustices, as it makes reference to the use of DDT, the Foster Botanical Garden and the Royal Hawaiian Hotel.

In 1995, Annie Lennox performed the song "Ladies of the Canyon" and released it as the B-side of her single "No More I Love You's". "Ladies of the Canyon" discusses three real women, Annie Burden, Estrella Berosini, and Trina Robbins.

Singer-songwriter Lana Del Rey included a cover of the song "For Free" as part of several dates of her 2019 Norman Fucking Rockwell! Tour. A studio version of the cover featuring Zella Day and Weyes Blood was also included in her 2021 album Chemtrails over the Country Club. The song critiques the "pop cash nexus" and centers the musical talent of a street busker.

"Rainy Night House" discusses Mitchell's brief relationship with Leonard Cohen, and a specific night they spent together in his childhood home.

One of Ladies of the Canyon’s most lauded tracks is "Woodstock", which has been heralded as an anthem of 1969's Woodstock Music and Art Fair. Woodstock is a well known event in the history of the 1960s countercultural revolution.

The Young and the Restless star Jess Walton stated that she was the owner of one of the houses featured on the album's cover.

== Track listing ==
All tracks are written by Joni Mitchell.

Side one

No.	Title	Length
1.	"Morning Morgantown"	3:13
2.	"For Free"	4:31
3.	"Conversation"	4:27
4.	"Ladies of the Canyon"	3:32
5.	"Willy"	3:00
6.	"The Arrangement"	3:34

Side two

No.	Title	Length
7.	"Rainy Night House"	3:24
8.	"The Priest"	3:41
9.	"Blue Boy"	2:54
10.	"Big Yellow Taxi"	2:14
11.	"Woodstock"	5:29
12.	"The Circle Game"	4:51

== Personnel ==
- Joni Mitchell – vocals, guitars, keyboards, cover illustration
- Teresa Adams – cello
- Paul Horn – clarinet, flute
- Jim Horn – baritone saxophone
- Milt Holland – percussion
- Crosby, Stills & Nash (as the Lookout Mountain United Downstairs Choir) – vocal chorus on "The Circle Game"

Production personnel

- Henry Lewy – engineer, production advice
- Don Bagley – cello arrangement

== Charts ==
=== Weekly charts ===
Weekly chart performance for Ladies of the Canyon
Chart (1970)	Peak position
Australian Albums (Kent Music Report)	32
Canada Top Albums/CDs (RPM)	16
UK Albums (Official Charts)	8
US Billboard 200	27
US Cash Box Top 100 Albums	18

Chart (2023)	Peak position
Hungarian Physical Albums (MAHASZ)	14

=== Year-end charts ===
Year-end chart performance for Ladies of the Canyon
Chart (1970)	Position
US Billboard 200	55

== Certifications ==
Region	Certification	Certified units/sales
United Kingdom (BPI)	Gold	100,000^{*}
United States (RIAA)	Platinum	1,000,000^{^}
^{*} Sales figures based on certification alone.^{^} Shipments figures based on certification alone.

== See also ==
- Album era
