= Clouds (Joni Mitchell album) =

Studio album by Joni Mitchell
- Released: May 1, 1969
- Studio: A&M (Hollywood)
- Genre: Folk
- Length: 37:45
- Label: Reprise
- Producers: Joni Mitchell; Paul A. Rothchild

Joni Mitchell chronology
Song to a Seagull (1968)	Clouds (1969)	Ladies of the Canyon (1970)

Clouds is the second album by the Canadian singer-songwriter Joni Mitchell, released on May 1, 1969, by Reprise Records. After releasing her debut album, Song to a Seagull (1968), to considerable exposure, Mitchell recorded Clouds at A&M Studios in Hollywood. She produced most of the album and painted a self-portrait for its cover artwork. (The red flower is a prairie lily, the provincial flower of Saskatchewan.) Clouds has subtle, unconventional harmonies and songs about lovers, among other themes.

The album charted at number 22 in Canada and number 31 in the United States. It has been certified gold by the Recording Industry Association of America, for shipments of 500,000 copies in the US. Clouds was generally well received by music critics.

== Background ==
After moving to New York City and signing to Reprise Records in 1967, Mitchell recorded her 1968 debut album Song to a Seagull with producer David Crosby. The album was a mostly acoustic set of songs, some of which were subsequently covered by more established singers such as Barbra Streisand. Consequently, Mitchell received more outside exposure and began to earn a strong cult following.

== Production ==
Mitchell recorded Clouds at A&M Studios in Hollywood and played acoustic guitar and keyboards; she was joined by Stephen Stills on guitar. She produced all of the album's songs, except "Tin Angel", which was produced by Paul A. Rothchild. She also painted the album's cover artwork—a self-portrait.

Two songs, "Chelsea Morning" and "Both Sides, Now", had already been recorded by other singers by the time Mitchell started work on the album. Mitchell wrote "Both Sides, Now" after reading Saul Bellow's 1959 novel Henderson the Rain King on a plane and drawing on a point in the novel where the protagonist is looking at clouds from a plane. The coincidence inspired the song's lyric about looking at clouds from both sides as a metaphor for life's ambiguities and mysteries, as she explained in a 1967 interview, "I dreamed down at the clouds, and thought that when I was a kid I had dreamed up at them, and having dreamed at the clouds from both sides as no generation of men has done, one should be able to accept his death very easily."

Clouds mostly features Mitchell's vocals and acoustic backing. Songs on the album feature unconventional, subtle harmonies, particularly "Songs to Aging Children Come", which employs chromatic harmonies. For the 1969 film Alice's Restaurant by Arthur Penn, Arlo Guthrie, and Venable Herndon, "Songs to Aging Children Come" was re-recorded and performed by Tigger Outlaw in an arrangement for solo vocals and guitar as diegetic music during a funeral service. Mitchell's composition was seen as pivotal for the "extraordinarily cinematic" and "beautiful" character of the scene. Mitchell was originally cast to perform the song herself, but declined after unsuccessful royalties negotiations with the film's producers.

== Release and reception ==
Professional ratings
Review scores
Source	Rating
AllMusic	4.5/5 stars
MusicHound	3/5
Encyclopedia of Popular Music	3/5 stars
Pitchfork	7.0/10
The Rolling Stone Album Guide	3.5/5 stars
The Village Voice	C

Clouds was released by Reprise Records on May 1, 1969. It peaked at number 22 on the RPM albums chart in Canada. In the United States, the album charted at number 31 on the Billboard 200. It won a Grammy Award for Best Folk Performance for 1969. In a contemporary review, Robert Christgau of The Village Voice felt that "without David Crosby's production ... Joni's voice sounds malnourished, which it is." He observed three "excellent" songs—"Roses Blue", "Both Sides, Now", and "Chelsea Morning"—but critiqued that the latter two "have been done better elsewhere", particularly Gloria Loring's cover of "Chelsea Morning".

Clouds was certified gold by the Recording Industry Association of America on August 28, 2001, having shipped 500,000 copies in the United States. In a retrospective review, AllMusic editor David Cleary called Clouds an "essential release" and "a stark stunner, a great leap forward for Joni Mitchell", commenting that her vocals "are more forthright and assured than on her debut and exhibit a remarkable level of subtle expressiveness." Although she found Mitchell "a bit too young and chipper to be singing about disillusionment", Pitchfork's Jessica Hopper nonetheless viewed the album as a "landmark" for Mitchell and an "introduction to [her] real deal, shaking folk tradition and giving off a little humor and spirit." Rolling Stone observed an "older-and-wiser tone" and "much-improved second album" after Mitchell's 1968 debut. The magazine ranked the song "Both Sides, Now" number 171 on their list of the 500 greatest songs of all time.

Clouds is considered a contemplative album by Rolling Stone. David Cleary comments that songs such as "Tin Angel", "That Song About the Midway", and "The Gallery" present sketches of lovers, that "I Don't Know Where I Stand" is about the uncertainty of new love, that "The Fiddle and the Drum" likens a warmongering U.S. government during the Vietnam War to a bitter friend, that "Roses Blue" discusses the misuse of the occult, and that "I Think I Understand" deals with mental illness. Jessica Hopper from Pitchfork feels that, "lyrically, [Mitchell] was transitioning from the era's de facto hippie sensualism (colors! the weather! vibes!) to the classically prosodic style (Keats! Cohen!) she'd become known for."

== Track listing ==
All tracks are written by Joni Mitchell.

Side one
No.	Title	Length
1.	"Tin Angel"	4:09
2.	"Chelsea Morning"	2:35
3.	"I Don't Know Where I Stand"	3:13
4.	"That Song About the Midway"	4:38
5.	"Roses Blue"	3:52

Side two
No.	Title	Length
1.	"The Gallery"	4:12
2.	"I Think I Understand"	4:28
3.	"Songs to Aging Children Come"	3:10
4.	"The Fiddle and the Drum"	2:50
5.	"Both Sides, Now"	4:32

== Personnel ==
Credits for Clouds adapted from liner notes.

- Henry Lewy – engineer
- Joni Mitchell – composer, cover art, guitar, keyboards, producer, vocals, uncredited peacock harp on "Roses Blue"
- Paul A. Rothchild – producer
- Stephen Stills – bass, guitar
- Ed Thrasher – art direction

== Charts ==
Chart performance for Clouds
Chart (1969)	Peak position
Canadian Albums Chart	22
US Billboard 200	31
US Cash Box Top 100 Albums	24

== Certifications ==
Region	Certification	Certified units/sales
Canada (Music Canada)	Gold	50,000^{^}
United Kingdom (BPI)	Gold	100,000^{‡}
United States (RIAA)	Gold	500,000^{^}
^{^} Shipments figures based on certification alone.^{‡} Sales+streaming figures based on certification alone.
