= Elliot Roberts =

American record executive and music manager (1943–2019)

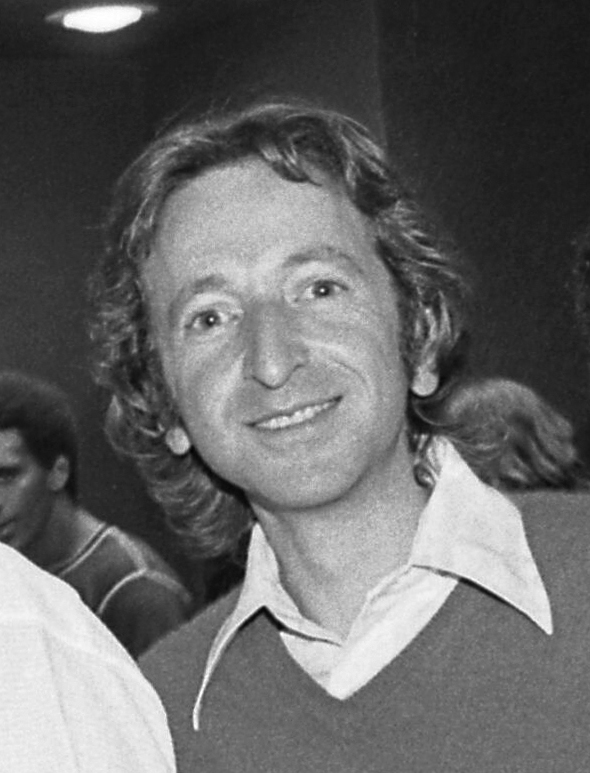
- Roberts in 1973

Background information
- Born: Elliot Rabinowitz; February 25, 1943; The Bronx, New York City, U.S.
- Died: June 21, 2019 (aged 76) Los Angeles, California, U.S.
- Occupations: Record executive; music manager
- Label: Asylum

Elliot Roberts (born Elliot Rabinowitz, February 25, 1943 – June 21, 2019) was an American record executive and music manager who co-founded Asylum Records, best known for helping to start and develop the careers of singer-songwriters from the late 1960s and 1970s, including those of Neil Young – whom he managed for over 50 years – and Joni Mitchell.

== Biography ==
He was born and grew up in The Bronx, New York City, to a Jewish family who fled Nazi persecution. After graduating from high school and dropping out of two colleges, Roberts attempted a career in acting before going to work for the William Morris Agency where he met David Geffen, an agent at the firm. He became the manager of Joni Mitchell after hearing a tape provided by Buffy Sainte-Marie, and seeing Mitchell perform in New York. They both soon moved to Laurel Canyon in California. After the band Buffalo Springfield split up in 1968, Mitchell persuaded him to manage the career of fellow Canadian Neil Young. He later also managed Crosby, Stills and Nash, America, and others. Roberts formed the Geffen-Roberts Company with Geffen, and helped Geffen to create Asylum Records in 1970, which merged with Elektra Records in 1972 to form Elektra/Asylum Records. After splitting with Geffen, Roberts set up Lookout Management.

Roberts was Joni Mitchell's manager until 1985, and remained Neil Young's manager until his death in 2019. Young called him "the greatest manager of all time", and in his autobiography wrote of him: "Because I tend to avoid the confrontations and delivering bad news, I am not good at doing any of that. Elliot is. He knows how to communicate where I don't. Just as I wake up every day with a new idea, he wakes up every day with a new approach to solving the problems that arise with the projects I am already immersed in. There are a lot of them. This is our pattern." Roberts himself said: "I think I'm tough. Have you ever met a guy in my position who thought he was a pussy? I'm tough, but I'm fair. No, I think I'm way tough, and I don't think I'm fair at all. Fairness comes into the equation sometimes, but when I deal with Neil for Neil, I don't care what's fair — I only care what Neil wants. Not what's fair." Roberts also supported Young's philanthropic and political work, and collaborated with Young creatively on film and video projects, often under his birth name of Elliot Rabinowitz. He launched Vapor Records with Young in 1995.

Despite Roberts’ reputation as a deeply committed advocate for his artists, his role as manager with The Cars has been recalled more ambivalently by several band members. In accounts of the group’s final years, David Robinson, Greg Hawkes, and Elliot Easton later suggested that Roberts became increasingly focused on lead singer Ric Ocasek’s individual direction while showing limited engagement in addressing internal tensions within the band. Robinson and Hawkes pointed in particular to Roberts’ absence—along with Ocasek—from a key 1988 meeting convened to discuss the band’s future, which they viewed as emblematic of managerial disengagement at a critical moment. Easton similarly recalled that little effort was made to keep the group together as Ocasek moved toward a solo career. Taken together, these recollections suggest that Roberts’ hands-off approach during The Cars’ final chapter may have contributed to the circumstances surrounding the band’s breakup.

Roberts also managed Tom Petty, Tracy Chapman, and Bob Dylan. He was also associated with Jackson Browne, the Eagles, Talking Heads, Devo, Spiritualized, Mazzy Star, Devendra Banhart, The Alarm, and others.

He died in 2019, aged 76; details were not reported.
