= Joni 75: A Birthday Celebration =

Live album tribute by various artists
- Released: March 8, 2019
- Recorded: November 2018
- Venues: The Music Center's Dorothy Chandler Pavilion, Los Angeles, California, US
- Label: Decca

Joni 75: A Birthday Celebration is a live tribute album to Joni Mitchell by various artists, released by Decca Records on March 8, 2019. The album, recorded in Los Angeles on November 7, 2018, to commemorate Mitchell's 75th birthday, features artists performing cover versions of her songs. A DVD of the concert was also released in 2019.

== Track listing ==
All tracks written by Joni Mitchell, except "Our House" by Graham Nash.

1. "Dreamland", performed by Los Lobos with La Marisoul, Xochi Flores and Cesar Castro
2. "Help Me", performed by Chaka Khan
3. "Amelia" and "Court and Spark", performed by Diana Krall
4. "All I Want" and "Blue", performed by Rufus Wainwright
5. "Coyote", performed by Glen Hansard
6. "River", performed by James Taylor
7. "Both Sides Now", performed by Seal
8. "Our House", performed by Graham Nash
9. "A Case of You", performed by Kris Kristofferson and Brandi Carlile
10. "Down to You", performed by Brandi Carlile
11. "Blue", performed by Rufus Wainwright
12. "Court and Spark", performed by Norah Jones
13. "Nothing Can Be Done", performed by Los Lobos with La Marisoul, Xochi Flores and Cesar Castro
14. "The Magdalene Laundries", performed by Emmylou Harris
15. "Woodstock", performed by James Taylor
16. "Big Yellow Taxi", performed by La Marisoul, James Taylor, Chaka Khan and Brandi Carlile

Track listing adapted from Rolling Stone

== DVD track listing ==
1. "Court and Spark" and "Borderline", performed by Norah Jones
2. "Coyote" and "The Boho Dance", performed by Glen Hansard
3. "For the Roses" and "Amelia", performed by Diana Krall
4. "Blue" and "All I Want", performed by Rufus Wainwright
5. "The Magdalene Laundries", performed by Emmylou Harris
6. "Help Me" and "Two Grey Rooms", performed by Chaka Khan
7. "Dreamland" and "Nothing Can Be Done", performed by Los Lobos with La Marisoul, Xochi Flores and Cesar Castro
8. "River" and "Woodstock", performed by James Taylor
9. "Both Sides Now" and "A Strange Boy", performed by Seal
10. "Our House", performed by Graham Nash
11. "A Case of You", performed by Kris Kristofferson and Brandi Carlile
12. "Down to You", performed by Brandi Carlile
13. "Big Yellow Taxi", performed by La Marisoul, James Taylor, Chaka Khan and Brandi Carlile

Birthday wishes for Joni from Peter Gabriel and Elton John.
