= Miles of Aisles =

Live album by Joni Mitchell
- Released: November 1974
- Recorded: March 2 and 4; August 14–17, 1974
- Venues: The Universal Amphitheatre, Dorothy Chandler Pavilion, and Berkeley Community Center
- Genres: Jazz; folk; pop
- Length: 78:01
- Label: Asylum
- Producer: Joni Mitchell

Joni Mitchell chronology
Court and Spark (1974)	Miles of Aisles (1974)	The Hissing of Summer Lawns (1975)

Professional ratings
Review scores
Source	Rating
AllMusic	3/5 stars
Christgau's Record Guide	B−
Encyclopedia of Popular Music	3/5 stars
MusicHound	3/5 stars
Rolling Stone	(not rated)
The Rolling Stone Album Guide	3/5 stars
Uncut	8/10

Miles of Aisles is the first live album by Canadian singer-songwriter Joni Mitchell, released in 1974 on Asylum Records. It is a double album documenting her concerts in support of the Court and Spark album with her backing band for the tour, the L.A. Express. It reached No. 2 on the Billboard 200 and became one of her biggest-selling records, certified a gold record by the RIAA.

== Content ==
This was Mitchell's first tour with backing musicians; prior to this she had generally performed solo, and had never organized a tour with a band. She hired an already existing group, the jazz fusion band L.A. Express, members of which had appeared on her previous studio album, Court and Spark, the biggest commercial success of her career. The band accompany her on sides one and four; Mitchell performs solo on sides two and three.

A track from this live album, "Big Yellow Taxi", was released as a single. Four years after the studio version had stalled at No. 67 on the Billboard Hot 100 as a single, this live version reached No. 24 on the Billboard Hot 100 charts, becoming Mitchell's fourth Top 40 hit single and third in a row.

The album contains many of her best-known songs up to that time, but only one track derived from her recent album and neither of its two hit singles, "Help Me" and "Free Man in Paris". It also includes two brand new songs "Love Or Money" and "Jericho" – the latter of which she would record a studio version of for her 1977 album Don Juan's Reckless Daughter. There is no known studio version of "Love Or Money" which only ever seems to have been performed live. All tracks except two were recorded at the Universal Amphitheatre in Los Angeles, August 14 to 17, 1974. "Cactus Tree" was recorded at the Dorothy Chandler Pavilion in the Los Angeles Music Center on March 4, and "Real Good for Free" at the Berkeley Community Theater on March 2. The cover photo was taken at the Pine Knob Music Theater in Clarkston, Michigan.

Record World said of the single release of "Jericho" that it is "a solid musical successor to 'Big Yellow Taxi.'"

== Track listing ==
All tracks are written by Joni Mitchell.

Side one

1. "You Turn Me On, I'm a Radio" – 4:09
2. "Big Yellow Taxi" – 3:09
3. "Rainy Night House" – 4:04
4. "Woodstock" – 4:29

Side two

1. "Cactus Tree" – 5:01
2. "Cold Blue Steel and Sweet Fire" – 5:23
3. "Woman of Heart and Mind" – 3:40
4. "A Case of You" – 4:42
5. "Blue" – 2:49

Side three

1. "The Circle Game" – 6:29
2. "People's Parties" – 2:42
3. "All I Want" – 3:21
4. "Real Good for Free" – 4:27
5. "Both Sides Now" – 4:14

Side four

1. "Carey" – 3:30
2. "The Last Time I Saw Richard" – 3:35
3. "Jericho" – 3:26
4. "Love or Money" – 4:50

== Personnel ==
- Joni Mitchell – vocals, guitar, piano, dulcimer, cover photograph and graphics

The L.A. Express

- Tom Scott – woodwind instruments, harmonica
- Robben Ford – electric guitar
- Larry Nash – piano
- Max Bennett – bass
- John Guerin – drums, percussion

Technical

- Henry Lewy – sound engineer, mixing
- Ken Caillat – Live Tracking engineer (for Wally Heiders)
- Anthony Hudson – art direction
- Mobile Recording: Wally Heider Recording, Ken Caillat
- with Jack Crymes, Biff Dawes

== Charts ==
=== Weekly charts ===
Weekly chart performance for Miles of Aisles
Chart (1974–1975)	Peak position
Australian Albums (Kent Music Report)	46
Canada Top Albums/CDs (RPM)	13
UK Albums (Official Charts)	34
US Billboard 200	2
US Cash Box Top 100 Albums	2

=== Year-end charts ===
Year-end chart performance for Miles of Aisles
Chart (1975)	Position
Canada Top Albums/CDs (RPM)	88
US Billboard 200	68
