= A Tribute to Joni Mitchell =

2007 compilation album by various artists

Compilation album by Various artists
- Released: April 24, 2007
- Genre: Folk, rock
- Length: 53:00
- Label: Nonesuch

Professional ratings
Review scores
Source	Rating
AllMusic	4/5 stars
Evening Standard	3/5 stars
Music Box	link
Pitchfork	2.9/10
Philadelphia Inquirer	2.5/4 stars
Popmatters	6/10
Record Collector	3/5 stars
Rolling Stone	3/5 stars
Uncut	4/5 stars

A Tribute to Joni Mitchell is a musical tribute to Joni Mitchell featuring Sufjan Stevens, Björk, Caetano Veloso, Brad Mehldau, Cassandra Wilson, Prince, Sarah McLachlan, Annie Lennox, Emmylou Harris, Elvis Costello, k.d. lang, and James Taylor.

== Track listing ==
Track	Title	Performer	Length	Original Album
1	"Free Man in Paris"	Sufjan Stevens	5:01	Court and Spark
2	"The Boho Dance"	Björk	5:08	The Hissing of Summer Lawns
3	"Dreamland"	Caetano Veloso	4:56	Don Juan's Reckless Daughter
4	"Don't Interrupt the Sorrow"	Brad Mehldau	5:10	The Hissing of Summer Lawns
5	"For the Roses"	Cassandra Wilson	5:57	For the Roses
6	"A Case of U"	Prince	3:31	Blue
7	"Blue"	Sarah McLachlan	2:49	Blue
8	"Ladies of the Canyon"	Annie Lennox	3:41	Ladies of the Canyon
9	"Magdalene Laundries"	Emmylou Harris	3:43	Turbulent Indigo
10	"Edith and the Kingpin"	Elvis Costello	5:58	The Hissing of Summer Lawns
11	"Help Me"	k.d. lang	4:00	Court and Spark
12	"River"	James Taylor	3:36	Blue

== Charts ==
Chart	Peak position
US Billboard Charts	103
UK Compilation Albums (OCC)	30
