= Wild Things Run Fast =

Studio album by Joni Mitchell
- Released: October 1982
- Studios: A&M (Hollywood); Devonshire (North Hollywood)
- Genre: Pop rock
- Length: 36:44
- Label: Geffen
- Producer: Joni Mitchell

Joni Mitchell chronology
Shadows and Light (1980)	Wild Things Run Fast (1982)	Dog Eat Dog (1985)

Singles from Wild Things Run Fast
- 1. "(You're So Square) Baby I Don't Care" Released: November 1982; 2. "Underneath the Streetlight" Released: February 1983 (US and Canada); 3. "Chinese Café (Unchained Melody)" Released: February 1983 (Europe and Australia)

Professional ratings
Review scores
Source	Rating
AllMusic	3/5 stars
Robert Christgau	B
The Encyclopedia of Popular Music	3/5 stars
Rolling Stone	4/5 stars

Wild Things Run Fast is the eleventh studio album by Canadian singer-songwriter Joni Mitchell. Her first of four releases for Geffen Records, it was released in 1982 and represents her move to a more 1980s pop sound. This was her first album to work with bassist Larry Klein, whom she married in 1982. Klein would play bass on and co-produce her next four albums.

== Inspiration ==
Mitchell claimed that her inspiration for the album came from hearing the music of popular bands such as Steely Dan, Talking Heads and The Police at a discothèque during a trip to the Caribbean in 1981. She said that hearing The Police, especially, affected her sound, saying, "their rhythmic hybrids, and the positioning of the drums, and the sound of the drums, was one of the main calls out to me to make a more rhythmic album".

== Tour ==
The resulting world tour took Mitchell through the U.S., Europe, Asia and Australia. A video of the tour was released in 1983, entitled Refuge of the Roads. The recorded performances were not performed in front of a live audience, but rather recorded live in a studio once the tour had been completed, with applause dubbed-in during post-production. There was also some Super 8 footage taken by Mitchell on the road. It has since been released on DVD.

== Track listing ==
All tracks are written by Joni Mitchell, except where noted.

Side one
No.	Title	Writer(s)	Length
1.	"Chinese Café / Unchained Melody"	Mitchell / Alex North, Hy Zaret	5:17
2.	"Wild Things Run Fast"		2:12
3.	"Ladies' Man"		2:37
4.	"Moon at the Window"		3:42
5.	"Solid Love"		2:57

Side two
No.	Title	Writer(s)	Length
1.	"Be Cool"		4:12
2.	"(You're So Square) Baby I Don't Care"	Jerry Leiber, Mike Stoller	2:36
3.	"You Dream Flat Tires"		2:50
4.	"Man to Man"		3:42
5.	"Underneath the Streetlight"		2:14
6.	"Love"		3:46

== Personnel ==
Track numbering refers to CD and digital releases of the album.

- Joni Mitchell – vocals, acoustic guitar (tracks 3, 5, 9, 10, 11), electric guitar on (tracks 4, 6, 8), piano (track 1), electric piano (track 10), cover painting
- Larry Klein – bass, rhythmic arrangements (tracks 2, 7)
- Michael Landau – electric guitar (tracks 5, 7, 8, 10)
- Steve Lukather – electric guitar (tracks 1, 2, 9, 11)
- John Guerin – drums (tracks 1, 4, 6, 9), whisper chorus (track 6)
- Vinnie Colaiuta – drums (tracks 2, 3, 5, 7, 8, 10, 11), rhythmic arrangements (tracks 2, 7)
- Don Alias – rhythmic arrangements (track 6)
- Larry Williams – Prophet synthesizer on (tracks 1, 2, 3), tenor saxophone (tracks 3, 7)
- Russell Ferrante – Oberheim synthesizer (tracks 4, 6, 9)
- Wayne Shorter – soprano saxophone (tracks 4, 6, 11)
- Larry Carlton – guitar (track 3)
- Victor Feldman – percussion (track 9)
- Kim Hutchcroft – baritone saxophone (track 7)
- Lionel Richie – backing vocals (track 3), co-lead vocals (track 8)
- Charles Valentino – backing vocals (track 3)
- Howard Kinney – backing vocals (track 3)
- James Taylor – backing vocals (track 9)
- Kenny Rankin – whisper chorus (track 6)
- Robert De La Garza – whisper chorus (track 6)
- Skip Cottrell – whisper chorus (track 6)

=== Technical personnel ===
- Joni Mitchell – production, mixing
- Larry Klein – mixing
- Henry Lewy – engineering at A&M
- Skip Cottrell – engineering at A&M
- Clyde Kaplan – assistant engineering at A&M
- Jerry Hudgins – engineering at Devonshire Sound
- Larry Hirsch – mixing
- Chase Williams – assistant mixing
- John Golden – vinyl mastering
- Lee Herschberg – CD mastering

== Reception ==
In The Boston Phoenix, Ken Emerson said that "Mitchell’s belated rediscovery of 'heart. and humor and humility' makes Wild Things Run Fast (Geffen) her finest album since Hejira and her most commercial since Court and Spark (1974). ... The album is by no means a regression, but it is a rejection of the false sophistication that made Don Juan and Mingus so off-putting. Now, once again, like a child but also like a true artist, Joni Mitchell is confronting life and herself 'face to face.'"

== Charts ==
Chart performance for Wild Things Run Fast
Chart (1982)	Peak position
Australian Albums (Kent Music Report)	51
Canada Top Albums/CDs (RPM)	33
New Zealand Albums (RMNZ)	10
Norwegian Albums (VG-lista)	14
Swedish Albums (Sverigetopplistan)	50
UK Albums (Official Charts)	32
US Billboard 200	25
US Cash Box Top 100 Albums	28
