= Shadows and Light (Joni Mitchell album) =

Live album by Joni Mitchell
- Released: September 1980
- Recorded: September 9, 1979
- Venue: Santa Barbara Bowl (Santa Barbara)
- Genres: Folk jazz, jazz fusion
- Length: 83:54
- Label: Asylum
- Producer: Joni Mitchell

Joni Mitchell chronology
Mingus (1979)	Shadows and Light (1980)	Wild Things Run Fast (1982)

Singles from Shadows and Light
- 1. "Why Do Fools Fall in Love" Released: September 1980

Shadows and Light is the second live album by Canadian musician Joni Mitchell. It was released in September 1980 through Asylum Records, her last release for the label. It was recorded on September 9, 1979 at the Santa Barbara Bowl in Santa Barbara, California.

For the album, Mitchell was backed by a band of acclaimed jazz and fusion musicians consisting of guitarist Pat Metheny, bassist Jaco Pastorius, drummer Don Alias, keyboardist Lyle Mays, and saxophonist Michael Brecker. The vocal group the Persuasions appear on the title track and a cover of Frankie Lymon & the Teenagers' "Why Do Fools Fall in Love".

== Overview ==
Shadows and Light was recorded during Mitchell's 1979 summer tour and used equipment of the Record Plant in Sausalito. The recordings of "Furry Sings the Blues", "Dreamland", and "God Must Be a Boogie Man" were taken from PA mix cassette recordings. Much of the material comes from Court and Spark (1974) onward, the only exceptions being "Woodstock" and the cover of "Why Do Fools Fall in Love".

== Reception ==
=== Commercial performance ===
Shadows and Light peaked at number 38 on the Billboard 200. "Why Do Fools Fall in Love" was released as a single and peaked at number 102 on the Hot 100.

=== Critical reception ===
Professional ratings
Review scores
Source	Rating
AllMusic	3/5 stars
The Encyclopedia of Popular Music	3/5 stars
Jazz Forum	5/5 stars

Reviews for Shadows and Light were positive. Writing for Rolling Stone, Stephen Holden called the album "a surprise and a triumph" and considered it "one of a handful of great live rock albums". Holden praised Mitchell's backing band as "the finest ensemble that [she] has worked with", and called her vocal performance "exhilarating". He went on to list the performances of "Edith and the Kingpin" and the title track as "the record's biggest stunners", feeling that the former's "spare live setting" worked to "uncover a mythic yarn of seduction and corruption" and praised the latter's pairing with "Why Do Fools Fall in Love".

In a retrospective review for AllMusic, Vik Iyengar praised the renditions on the album to be more energetic than their studio counterparts; however, he also felt that many live versions were "not different enough" than the original studio versions. In a piece commemorating the album's 40th anniversary, The Economist called the album "unjustly overlooked" and also highlighted its title track, stating that Mitchell's collaboration with the Persuasions gave the song "a new, organic richness".

== Track listing ==
All tracks are written by Joni Mitchell, except where noted.

Side one
No.	Title	Writer(s)	Length
1.	"Introduction"		1:51
2.	"In France They Kiss on Main Street"		4:14
3.	"Edith and the Kingpin"		4:10
4.	"Coyote"		4:58
5.	"Goodbye Pork Pie Hat"	Mitchell; Charles Mingus	6:02

Side two
No.	Title	Writer(s)	Length
1.	"The Dry Cleaner from Des Moines"	Mitchell; Mingus	4:37
2.	"Amelia"		6:40
3.	"Pat's Solo"	Pat Metheny	3:09
4.	"Hejira"		7:42

Side three
No.	Title	Writer(s)	Length
1.	"Black Crow"		3:52
2.	"Don's Solo"	Don Alias	4:04
3.	"Dreamland"		4:40
4.	"Free Man in Paris"		3:23
5.	"Band Introduction"	improvised speech	0:52
6.	"Furry Sings the Blues"		5:14

Side four
No.	Title	Writer(s)	Length
1.	"Why Do Fools Fall in Love"	Frankie Lymon; Herman Santiago; Jimmy Merchant	2:53
2.	"Shadows and Light"		5:23
3.	"God Must Be a Boogie Man"		5:02
4.	"Woodstock"		5:08

Notes:

- "Black Crow", "Don's Solo" and "Free Man in Paris" omitted from first CD release.
- "Don's Solo", "Dreamland", "God Must Be a Boogie Man" and "Woodstock" omitted from VHS and DVD.
- VHS and DVD releases feature two extra tracks, "Jaco's Solo" and "Raised on Robbery", and include a different version of "Furry Sings the Blues".

== Personnel ==
Musicians

- Joni Mitchell – electric guitar, vocals
- Pat Metheny – lead guitar
- Jaco Pastorius – electric bass (Fender Jazz)
- Don Alias – drums, percussion
- Lyle Mays – piano, electric piano (Rhodes), synthesizer (Oberheim FVS-1)
- Michael Brecker – saxophones
- The Persuasions – backing vocals on "Why Do Fools Fall in Love" and "Shadows and Light"

Production

- Andy Johns – engineer (recording)
- Bernie Grundman – engineer (mastering)
- Glen Cristensen – art direction, photography
- Joel Bernstein – photography

== Charts ==
Chart performance for Shadows and Light
Chart (1980)	Peak position
Australian Albums (Kent Music Report)	70
Canada Top Albums/CDs (RPM)	73
New Zealand Albums (RMNZ)	40
Norwegian Albums (VG-lista)	25
UK Albums (Official Charts)	63
US Billboard 200	38
US Cash Box Top 100 Albums	38
