= Joni Mitchell at Newport =

Live album by Joni Mitchell
- Released: July 28, 2023
- Recorded: July 24, 2022
- Venue: Fort Adams State Park (Newport, Rhode Island)
- Length: 61:24
- Label: Rhino
- Producer: Brandi Carlile; Joni Mitchell

Joni Mitchell chronology
The Asylum Albums (1972–1975) (2022)	Joni Mitchell at Newport (2023)	Joni Mitchell Archives – Vol. 3: The Asylum Years (1972–1975) (2023)

Joni Mitchell at Newport is a live album by singer-songwriter Joni Mitchell, released on July 28, 2023, by Rhino Records. The album contains her entire performance at the 2022 Newport Folk Festival on July 24, 2022. For the performance, Mitchell was joined by a group of musicians (credited as "the Joni Jam") including Brandi Carlile, Wynonna Judd, and Marcus Mumford. It was her first public performance since suffering an aneurysm in 2015. The album won the Grammy Award for Best Folk Album in 2024.

== Critical reception ==
Professional ratings
Aggregate scores
Source	Rating
Metacritic	79/100
Review scores
Source	Rating
American Songwriter	4.5/5 stars
Exclaim!	8/10
Pitchfork	6.0/10

Joni Mitchell at Newport received a score of 79 out of 100 on review aggregator Metacritic based on twelve critics' reviews, indicating "generally favorable reviews". Uncut deemed it "fair to say that Mitchell rarely does the heavy lifting here. Her role onstage is a fluid one: muse-goddess, North Star, shredder, comic foil and sometimes singer. The playing by her fellow artists is stellar and the backing vocals, in particular, ooze class", while Classic Rock described it as an "album packed with absolute love and admiration that is moving and inspiring in the extreme".

Reviewing the album for Exclaim!, Sam Boer called the album "a reminder of the way Mitchell lives, and the way her music compels us to live", writing that "the sheer variety of musicians on stage for this festival performance is reason enough" to listen to the album, whose arrangements "carry a necessarily improvisational energy". Boer concluded it is Mitchell's "victory lap". Lee Zimmerman of American Songwriter found it "hard not to get caught up in the sentiment shared both on and off that festival stage" and summarized the album as "a remarkable recording" and one that "can easily be considered an album for the ages".

Grayson Haver Currin of Pitchfork likened the album to "a selfie snapped from some overwhelming vista, where the faces of the subjects accidentally crowd out the actual sight they're there to behold", and wrote that "Carlile's approach to the songs borders on suffocation" as she is "constantly reminding the audience that she's here, that she's partially responsible for this". Currin nevertheless felt that it "does get one thing exactly right, a sometimes-neglected aspect of Mitchell's career: her humor or, more exactly, her laughter", as her wit has been "frequently overlooked".

== Track listing ==
All tracks are written by Joni Mitchell, except "Summertime" written by George Gershwin, Ira Gershwin, and DuBose Heyward.

Joni Mitchell at Newport track listing
No.	Title	Length
1.	"Introduction by Brandi Carlile"	2:41
2.	"Big Yellow Taxi"	2:40
3.	"A Case of You"	4:51
4.	"Amelia"	7:59
5.	"Both Sides Now"	5:40
6.	"Just Like This Train"	3:31
7.	"Summertime"	5:52
8.	"Carey"	3:37
9.	"Help Me"	5:20
10.	"Come in from the Cold"	7:34
11.	"Shine"	5:44
12.	"The Circle Game"	5:55
Total length:		61:24

== Personnel ==
Adopted from jonimitchell.com.

- Joni Mitchell – lead vocals, guitar (6)
- Brandi Carlile – vocals, producer
- Phil Hanseroth – bass, backing vocals
- Tim Hanseroth – guitar, dulcimer, backing vocals
- Jess Wolfe – featured vocals (2), backing vocals
- Holly Laessig – featured vocals (2), backing vocals
- Taylor Goldsmith – guitar, featured vocals (4, 10), backing vocals
- Celisse – guitar, featured vocals (9), backing vocals
- Ben Lusher – piano
- Blake Mills – guitar, backing vocals
- Marcus Mumford – percussion, featured vocals (3), backing vocals
- Josh Neumann – cello
- Allison Russell – clarinet, backing vocals
- Rick Whitfield – guitar, backing vocals
- Matt Chamberlain – additional percussion

Group vocalists

- Wynonna Judd
- Shooter Jennings
- Kyleen King
- SistaStrings

- Monique Ross
- Chauntee Ross

- Jay Carlile
- Marcy Gensic
- Sauchuen Yu

== Charts ==
Chart performance for Joni Mitchell at Newport
Chart (2023)	Peak position
Belgian Albums (Ultratop Flanders)	115
German Albums (Offizielle Top 100)	64
Hungarian Physical Albums (MAHASZ)	7
Japanese Hot Albums (Billboard Japan)	85
Scottish Albums (OCC)	6
Swiss Albums (Schweizer Hitparade)	75
UK Albums (OCC)	52
US Billboard 200	167
US Top Album Sales (Billboard)	11
US Americana/Folk Albums (Billboard)	9
US Top Rock & Alternative Albums (Billboard)	40
US Top Current Album Sales (Billboard)	11
US Vinyl Albums (Billboard)	17
