= Arthur Kratzmann =

Australian educator

- Born: 1925; Kingaroy, Queensland, Australia
- Died: 2015 (aged 89–90); British Columbia
- Occupation: Teacher
- Known for: Teaching and influence on Joni Mitchell

Arthur Kratzmann (1925-2015) was an Australian teacher and later professor of education who spent most of his adult life working in Canada.

== Biography ==
Kratzmann was a precocious student in rural Queensland and already held a teaching job of his own in a one-room schoolhouse when he was 17 years old. In 1943, when he turned 18 and was old enough to enlist, he enlisted in the Royal Australian Air Force which sent him to Canada for training. He trained to be a pilot and married his wife, Mary, in Canada before he was 19. He describes earning his wings late enough in the war that he didn't experience front-line risks.

Kratzmann and his wife lived in Australia for three years after the war but returned to Canada where he returned to teaching in Viking District (near Kinistino) Saskatchewan.

Kratzmann taught English composition to Joni Mitchell when she was in seventh grade. He could see she was a potentially talented writer but limited by conventions and undue respect to well-known poets and authors. He describes challenging her to transcend cliché, and Mitchell credits his challenges as having a profound and lasting influence on the rest of her life. Twelve years later she dedicated her first album to him.

Kratzmann was invited to surprise Mitchell with an award at a celebration of her career in 2001. He described waiting in the wings during an on-stage interview that preceded his surprise appearance and hearing her describe the profound influence he had on her.

Kratzmann would eventually earn his bachelor's degree, a master's degree, and a PhD before becoming a professor at a university in Alberta. Kratzmann would rise to be the dean of education at the University of Regina. In 1981 he accepted an appointment as dean of education at the University of Victoria in British Columbia.
