= Raised on Robbery =

- German cover

Single by Joni Mitchell

from the album Court and Spark
- B-side: "Court and Spark"
- Released: December 1973
- Recorded: 1973
- Studio: A&M (Hollywood, California)
- Genre: Soft rock
- Length: 2:20
- Label: Asylum
- Songwriter: Joni Mitchell
- Producer: Joni Mitchell

Joni Mitchell singles chronology
"Cold Blue Steel and Sweet Fire" (1973)	"Raised on Robbery" (1973)	"Help Me" (1974)

"Raised on Robbery" is a song written by Joni Mitchell. It was the lead single from her 1974 album Court and Spark.

== Lyrics and music ==
The lyrics are about a prostitute who tries to pick up a man sitting alone in a hotel lounge. The prostitute tells him about her life, until at the end of the song the man leaves. Los Angeles Times music critic Robert Hilburn explains that although the lyrics are provocative, they are "camouflaged enough" for AM radio, for example by using a cooking metaphor.

"Raised on Robbery" has a strophic structure with a refrain at the end of each verse and a four-line introduction section to describe the setting and characters. The music is more commercial than much of the music Mitchell performed before releasing this song, and Allmusic critic William Ruhlmann describes it as "an outright rock tune," although retaining the acoustic guitar work that Mitchell was known for. Robbie Robertson of the Band plays electric guitar on the song to enhance the rock music feel. Billboard described the guitar playing as "funky" and said that the guitars and horns keep the music flowing. According to music professor Lloyd Whitesell, Mitchell "employs vocal histrionics to portray" the prostitute and conveys her brash personalities through "a bright, forceful vocal tone and suggestive, flamboyant slides."

== Reception ==
Music critic Sean Nelson regarded "Raised on Robbery" as a tribute to such 1950s rock and roll songs as "Shake Rattle and Roll" and performers such as Chuck Berry but did not think it was very convincing, saying that it sounded "stodgy and wrinkled." On the other hand, Ruhlmann regarded the song as a perfectly realized "short story in song" with "funny and saucy" lyrics. Fellow Allmusic critic Jason Ankeny stated that "Raised on Robbery" " offers an acutely funny look at the predatory environment of the singles bar scene." Hilburn called it the "liveliest track" on Court and Spark, calling it a "surprising, but welcome exercise in humor." Tallahassee Democrat critic Bud Newman claimed that it was the only song on Court and Spark that "comes right out and grabs you, holding you captive to the lyric and the musical package." Cash Box said that "a rocking, rolling hard driving effort by Joni is a rarity...but this one was well worth waiting for." Record World said that "Joni goes for a boogie-woogie beat, tight '30s harmonies and great instrumental backup on her spectacular new single entry."

"Raised on Robbery" reached No. 50 on the Cashbox singles chart, No. 65 on the Billboard Hot 100, and No. 40 on the Billboard Adult Contemporary chart.

"Raised on Robbery" was later included on the video version of Mitchell's 1980 live album Shadows and Light, along with her compilation albums Hits (1996) and Songs of a Prairie Girl (2005), the latter album being dedicated to Saskatchewan's centenary celebrations.

== Covers ==
- The song was covered by the Trans-Canada Highwaymen for their 2023 album, Explosive Hits Vol. 1.
- The song was covered by Kate Stables, Jesca Hoop and Lail Arad for their 2025 album, The Songs of Joni Mitchell Vol.1 .

== Charts ==
Chart performance for "Raised on Robbery"
Chart (1973–1974)	Peak position
Canada Top Singles (RPM)	51
Canada Adult Contemporary (RPM)	27
New Zealand (Listener)	14
US Billboard Hot 100	65
US Adult Contemporary (Billboard)	40
US Cash Box Top 100	50
Quebec (ADISQ)	26
