= Joni Mitchell =

Canadian-American singer-songwriter (born 1943)

Joni Mitchell CC
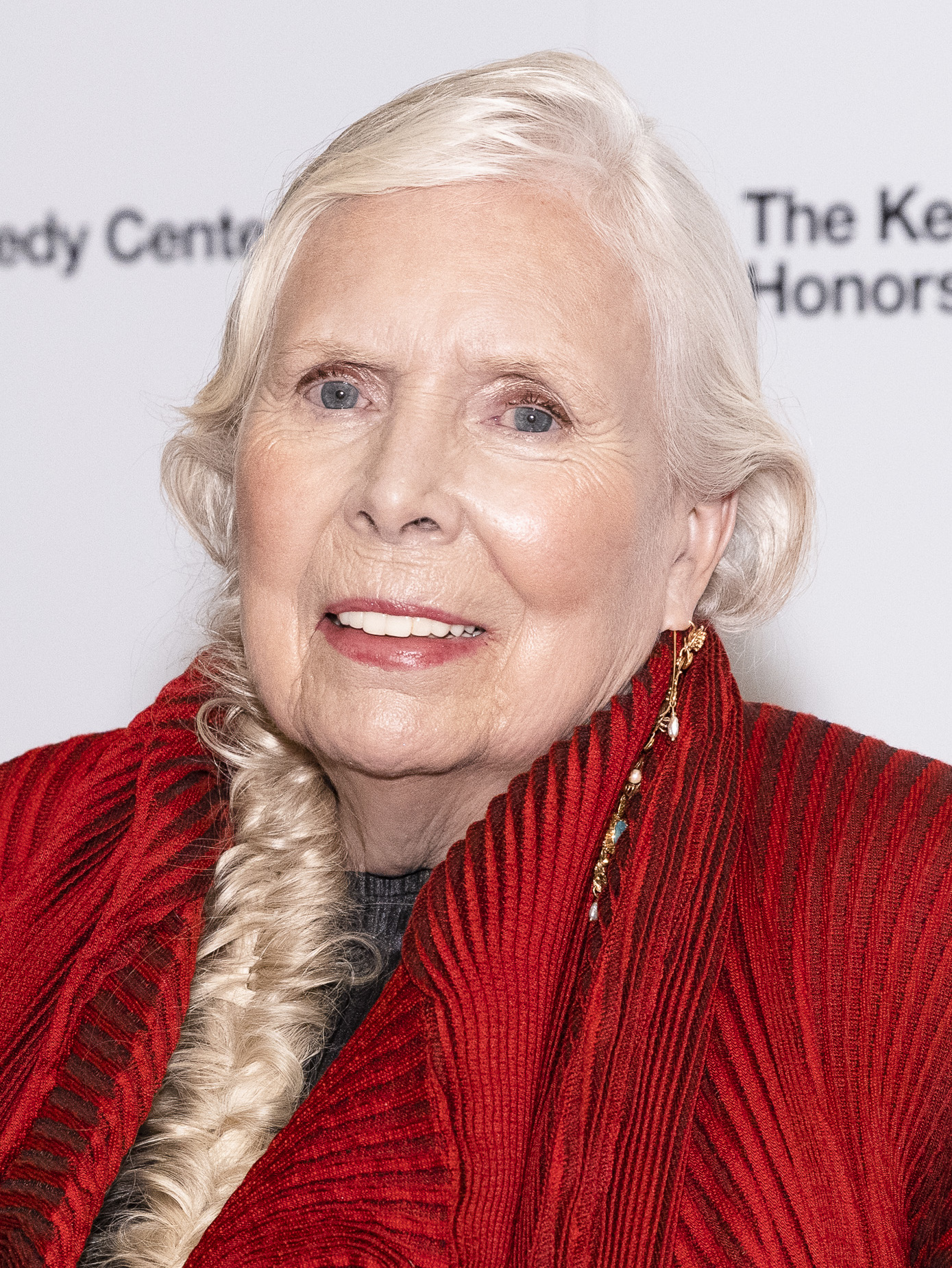
- Mitchell in 2021
- Born: Roberta Joan Anderson; November 7, 1943 (age 83); Fort Macleod, Alberta, Canada
- Other names: Roberta Joan Mitchell; Joni Anderson
- Citizenship: Canada; United States (since 2026)
- Occupations: Singer-songwriter; painter; record producer
- Spouses: Chuck Mitchell (m. 1965; div. 1967) Larry Klein (m. 1982; div. 1994)
- Musical career
- Genres: Folk; pop; jazz; rock
- Instruments: Vocals; guitar; piano; keyboards; dulcimer
- Works: Discography
- Years active: 1964–2002; 2006–2007; 2013; 2022–present
- Labels: Reprise; Asylum; Geffen; Nonesuch; Hear Music
- Website: jonimitchell.com

Roberta Joan Mitchell (née Anderson; born November 7, 1943) is a Canadian and American singer-songwriter, multi-instrumentalist, and painter. As one of the most influential singer-songwriters to emerge from the 1960s folk music circuit, Mitchell became known for her personal lyrics and unconventional compositions, which grew to incorporate elements of pop, jazz, rock, and other genres. Among her accolades are eleven Grammy Awards, and induction into the Rock and Roll Hall of Fame in 1997. Rolling Stone, in 2002, named her "one of the greatest songwriters ever", and AllMusic, in a 2011 biography, stated "Joni Mitchell may stand as the most important and influential female recording artist of the late 20th century." The Economist magazine, while acknowledging that "[n]o one questions her greatness," also decried that Joni is not regularly given her full due for revolutionising popular music, "in its entirety," in contrast to similarly influential male musicians like Bob Dylan, Miles Davis and John Coltrane.

Mitchell began singing in small nightclubs in Saskatoon and throughout western Canada, before moving on to the nightclubs of Toronto. She moved to the United States and began touring in 1965. Some of her original songs ("Urge for Going", "Chelsea Morning", "Both Sides, Now", "The Circle Game") were first recorded by other singers, allowing her to sign with Reprise Records and record her debut album, Song to a Seagull, in 1968. Settling in Southern California, Mitchell helped define an era and a generation with popular songs such as "Big Yellow Taxi" and "Woodstock" (both 1970). Her 1971 album Blue is often cited as one of the greatest albums of all time; it was rated the 30th best album ever made in Rolling Stone's 2003 list of the "500 Greatest Albums of All Time", rising to number 3 in the 2020 edition. In 2000, The New York Times chose Blue as one of the 25 albums that represented "turning points and pinnacles in 20th-century popular music". NPR ranked Blue number 1 on a 2017 list of the "Greatest Albums Made By Women".

Mitchell began exploring more jazz-influenced ideas on 1974's Court and Spark, which featured the radio hits "Help Me" and "Free Man in Paris" and became her best-selling album. Mitchell's vocal range began to shift from mezzo-soprano to that of a wide-ranging contralto around 1975. Her distinctive piano and open-tuned guitar compositions also grew more harmonically and rhythmically complex as she melded jazz with rock and roll, R&B, classical music and non-Western beats. Starting in the mid-1970s, she began working with noted jazz musicians including Jaco Pastorius, Tom Scott, Wayne Shorter, Herbie Hancock, and Pat Metheny as well as Charles Mingus, who asked her to collaborate on his final recordings. She later turned to pop and electronic music and engaged in political protest. She was awarded the Grammy Lifetime Achievement Award in 2002.

Mitchell produced or co-produced most of her albums and designed most of her own album covers, describing herself as a "painter derailed by circumstance". A critic of the music industry, she quit touring and released her 19th and last album of original songs in 2007. She gave occasional interviews and made appearances to speak on various causes over the next two decades, though the rupture of a brain aneurysm in 2015 led to a long period of recovery and therapy. A series of retrospective compilations were released over this time period, culminating in the Joni Mitchell Archives, a project to publish much of the unreleased material from her long career. She returned to public appearances in 2021, accepting several awards in person, including a Kennedy Center Honor. Mitchell returned to live performance with an unannounced show at the June 2022 Newport Folk Festival and has made several other appearances since, including headlining shows in 2023 and 2024.

== Early life and education ==
Roberta Joan Anderson was born on November 7, 1943, in Fort Macleod, Alberta to Myrtle Marguerite (née McKee) and William Andrew Anderson. Her mother's ancestors were Scottish and Irish; her father was from a Norwegian family that may have had some Sámi ancestry, according to one family member. (Note: Norwegian genealogist Arnfrid Mæland disputes this claim, saying that the family tree has no Sámi lineage dating back to the 1600s.Staalesen, Tidende; Hilde, Bergens (July 22, 2009). "She was told she was Sámi". jonimitchell.com. US: jonitmitchell.com.) Her mother was a teacher. Her father was a Royal Canadian Air Force flight lieutenant who instructed new pilots at RCAF Station Fort Macleod. During World War II, she moved with her parents to various bases in western Canada. After the war ended, her father worked as a grocer and her family moved to Saskatchewan, living in Maidstone and North Battleford. She later sang about her small-town upbringing in several of her songs, including "Song for Sharon".

Mitchell contracted polio at age nine and was hospitalized for weeks. She also started smoking that year, but denies that smoking affected her voice.

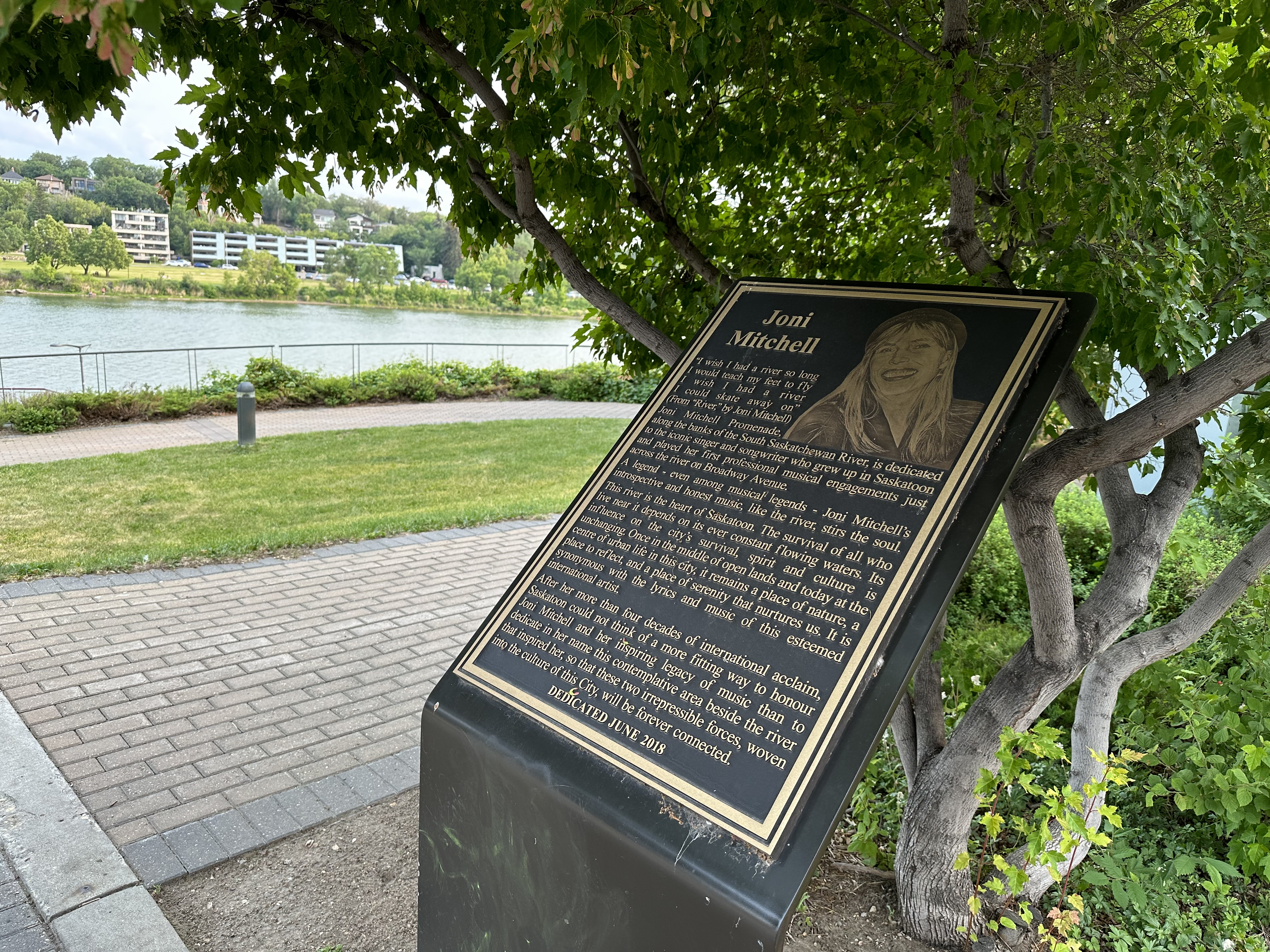
A plaque along the South Saskatchewan River in Saskatoon commemorates her upbringing in the city and the waterway's inspiration for her 1971 song "River".

She moved with her family to Saskatoon, which she considers her hometown, at age 11. Mitchell struggled at school; her main interest was painting. During this time she briefly studied classical piano. She focused on her creative talent and considered a singing or dancing career for the first time. One unconventional teacher, Arthur Kratzmann, made an impact on her, stimulating her to write poetry; her first album includes a dedication to him. She dropped out of school in grade 12 (the final year of high school) resuming her studies later, and hung out downtown with a rowdy set until she decided that she was getting too close to the criminal world.

Mitchell wanted to play the guitar, but as her mother associated the instrument with country music and disapproved of its hillbilly associations, she initially settled for the ukulele. Eventually she taught herself guitar from a Pete Seeger songbook. Polio had weakened her left hand, so she devised alternative tunings to compensate; she later used these tunings to create nonstandard approaches to harmony and structure in her songwriting.

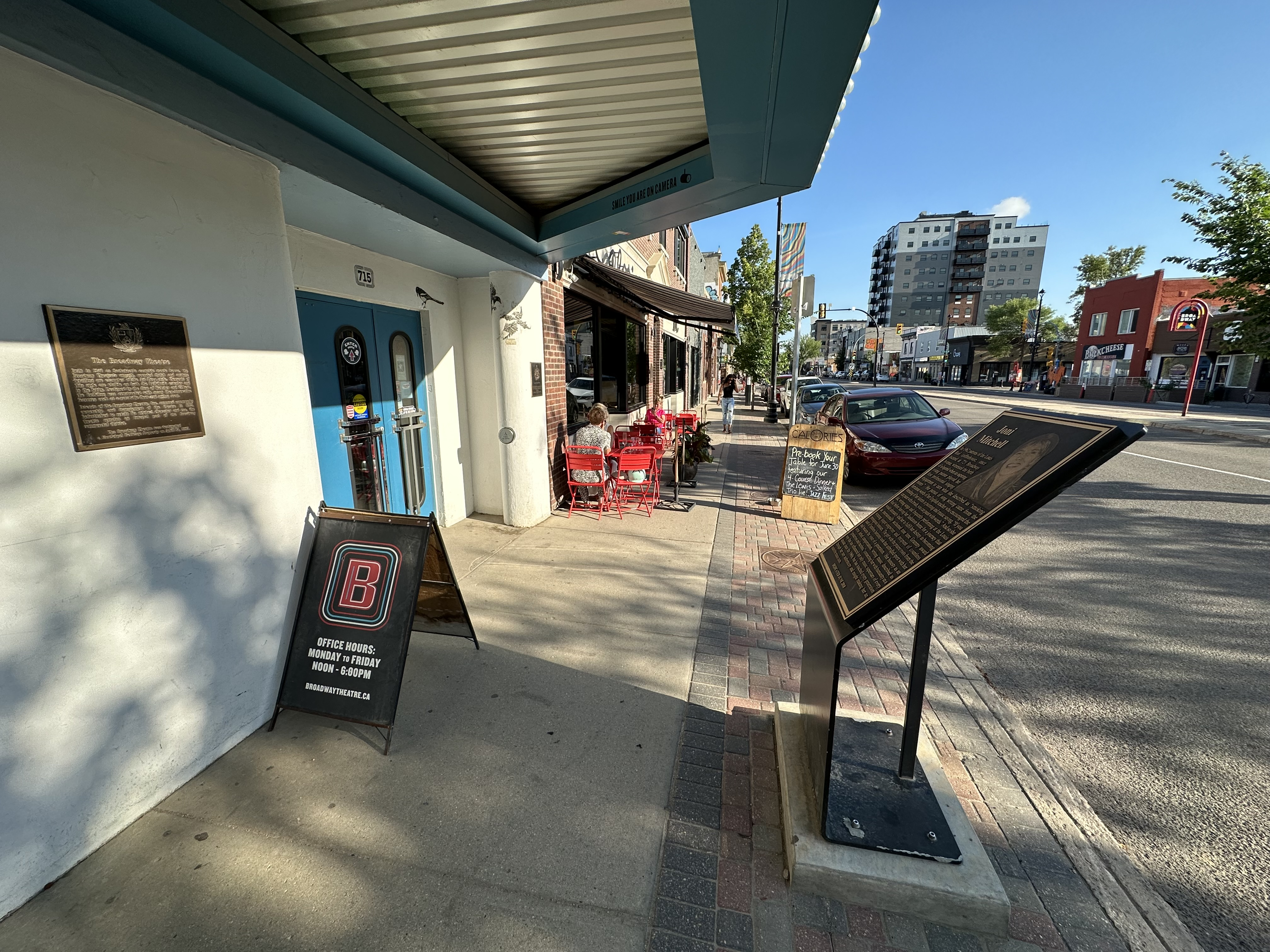
A plaque (on sidewalk, right) in Saskatoon commemorates the spot on Broadway Avenue where she made her first professional performance in 1962 at the Louis Riel coffeehouse.

Mitchell started singing with her friends at bonfires around Waskesiu Lake, northwest of Prince Albert, Saskatchewan. She widened her repertoire to include her favourite performers, such as Édith Piaf and Miles Davis, at age 18. Her first paid performance was on October 31, 1962, at a Saskatoon club that featured folk and jazz performers. Although she never performed jazz herself in those days, Mitchell and her friends sought out gigs by jazz musicians. Mitchell said, "My jazz background began with one of the early Lambert, Hendricks and Ross albums." That album, The Hottest New Group in Jazz, was hard to find in Canada, she says, "so I saved up and bought it at a bootleg price. I considered that album to be my Beatles. I learned every song off of it, and I don't think there is another album anywhere—including my own—on which I know every note and word of every song." Her hit "Twisted" was a cover of a track on that album.

After graduating from high school at Aden Bowman Collegiate in Saskatoon, Mitchell took art classes at the Saskatoon Technical Collegiate with abstract expressionist painter Henry Bonli and left home to attend the Alberta College of Art in Calgary for the 1963–64 school year. She felt disillusioned about the high priority given to technical skill over free-class creativity there, and felt out of step with the trend toward pure abstraction and the tendency to move into commercial art. She dropped out of school after a year at age 20 when she unexpectedly became pregnant with her daughter Kilauren. She then started playing music in the nightclubs of Canada.

== Career ==
=== 1964–1967: Career beginnings, motherhood, and first marriage ===
She continued to play gigs as a folk musician on weekends at her college and at a local hotel. Around this time she took a $15-a-week job in a Calgary coffeehouse called The Depression Coffee House, "singing long tragic songs in a minor key". She sang at hootenannies and made appearances on local TV and radio shows in Calgary. In 1964, at the age of 20, she told her mother that she intended to be a folk singer in Toronto. She left western Canada for the first time in her life, heading east for Ontario. Mitchell wrote her first song, "Day After Day", on the three-day train ride. She stopped at the Mariposa Folk Festival to see Buffy Sainte-Marie, an American folk singer who had inspired her. A year later, Mitchell played Mariposa, her first gig for a major audience, and years later Sainte-Marie herself covered Mitchell's work.

Lacking the $200 needed for musicians' union fees, Mitchell performed at a few gigs at the Half Beat and the Village Corner in Toronto's Yorkville neighbourhood, but she mostly played non-union gigs "in church basements and YMCA meeting halls". Rejected from major folk clubs, she resorted to busking, while she "worked in the women's wear section of a downtown department store to pay the rent." She lived in a rooming house, directly across the hall from poet Duke Redbird. Mitchell also began to realize each city's folk scene tended to accord veteran performers the exclusive right to play their signature songs—despite not having written the songs—which Mitchell found insular, contrary to the egalitarian ideal of folk music. She found her best traditional material was already other singers' property. She said she was told "'You can't sing that. That's my song.' And I named another one. 'You can't sing that. That's my song.' This is my introduction to territorial songs. I ran into it again in Toronto." She resolved to write her own songs.

Mitchell discovered that she was pregnant by her Calgary ex-boyfriend Brad MacMath in late 1964. She later wrote, "[He] left me three months pregnant in an attic room with no money and winter coming on and only a fireplace for heat. The spindles of the banister were gap-toothed—fuel for last winter's occupants." She gave birth to a baby girl in February 1965. Unable to provide for her daughter, Kelly Dale Anderson, she placed her for adoption. The experience remained private for most of Mitchell's career, although she alluded to it in several songs, such as "Little Green", which she performed in the 1960s and recorded for the 1971 album Blue. In "Chinese Cafe", from the 1982 album Wild Things Run Fast, Mitchell sang, "Your kids are coming up straight / My child's a stranger / I bore her / But I could not raise her."

The existence of Mitchell's daughter was not publicly known until 1993, when a roommate from Mitchell's art school days in the 1960s sold the story of the adoption to a tabloid magazine. By that time, Mitchell's daughter, renamed Kilauren Gibb, had already begun a search for her biological parents. Mitchell and her daughter met in 1997. After the reunion, Mitchell said that she lost interest in songwriting, and she later identified her daughter's birth and her inability to take care of her as the moment when her songwriting inspiration had begun.

A few weeks after the birth of her daughter, Mitchell was playing gigs again around Yorkville, often with a friend, Vicky Taylor, and was beginning to sing original material for the first time, written with her unique open tunings. In March and April she found work at the Penny Farthing, a folk club in Toronto. There she met New York City-born American folk singer Charles Scott "Chuck" Mitchell, from Michigan. Chuck was immediately attracted to her and impressed by her performance, and he told her that he could get her steady work in the coffeehouses he knew in the United States.

Mitchell left Canada for the first time in late April 1965. She travelled with Chuck Mitchell to the US, where they began playing music together. Joni, 21 years old, married Chuck in an official ceremony in his hometown in June 1965 and took his surname. She said, "I made my dress and bridesmaids' dresses. We had no money ... I walked down the aisle brandishing my daisies."

While living at the Verona apartments in Detroit's Cass Corridor, the couple regularly performed at area coffee houses, including the Chess Mate on Livernois, near Six Mile Road; the Alcove bar, near Wayne State University; the Rathskeller, a restaurant on the campus of the University of Detroit; and the Raven Gallery in Southfield. She began playing and composing songs in alternative guitar tunings taught to her by a fellow musician, Eric Andersen, in Detroit. Oscar Brand featured her several times on his CBC television program Let's Sing Out in 1965 and 1966. The marriage and partnership of Joni and Chuck Mitchell ended with their divorce in early 1967, and she moved to New York City to follow her musical path as a solo artist. She played venues up and down the East Coast, including Philadelphia, Boston, and Fort Bragg, North Carolina. She performed frequently in coffeehouses and folk clubs and, by this time creating her own material, became well known for her unique songwriting and innovative guitar style.

=== 1968–1969: Breakthrough with Song to a Seagull and Clouds ===
Folk singer Tom Rush had met Mitchell in Toronto and was impressed with her songwriting ability. He took "Urge for Going" to the popular folk artist Judy Collins, but she was not interested in the song at the time, so Rush recorded it himself. Country singer George Hamilton IV heard Rush performing it and recorded a hit country version. Other artists who recorded Mitchell's songs in the early years were Sainte-Marie ("The Circle Game"), Dave Van Ronk ("Both Sides Now"), and eventually Collins ("Both Sides Now", a top ten hit for her, and "Michael from Mountains", were both included on her 1967 album Wildflowers). Collins also covered "Chelsea Morning", another recording that eclipsed Mitchell's own commercial success early on.

While Mitchell was playing one night in 1967 in the Gaslight South, a club in Coconut Grove, Florida, David Crosby walked in and was immediately struck by her ability and her appeal as an artist. She accompanied him back to Los Angeles, where he set about introducing her and her music to his friends. Soon she was being managed by Elliot Roberts, who, after being urged by Sainte-Marie, had first seen her play in a Greenwich Village coffee house. He had a close business association with David Geffen. Roberts and Geffen were to have important influences on her career. She was signed to the Warners-affiliated Reprise label by talent scout Andy Wickham. Crosby convinced Reprise to let Mitchell record a solo acoustic album without the folk-rock overdubs in vogue at that time, and his clout earned him a producer's credit in March 1968, when Reprise released her debut album, known either as Joni Mitchell or Song to a Seagull.

Mitchell toured steadily to promote the LP. The tour helped create eager anticipation for Mitchell's second LP, Clouds, which was released in April 1969. This album contained Mitchell's own versions of some of her songs already recorded and performed by other artists: "Chelsea Morning", "Both Sides, Now", and "Tin Angel". The covers of both LPs, including a self-portrait on Clouds, were designed and painted by Mitchell, a blending of her painting and music that she continued throughout her career.

=== 1970–1972: Ladies of the Canyon and Blue ===
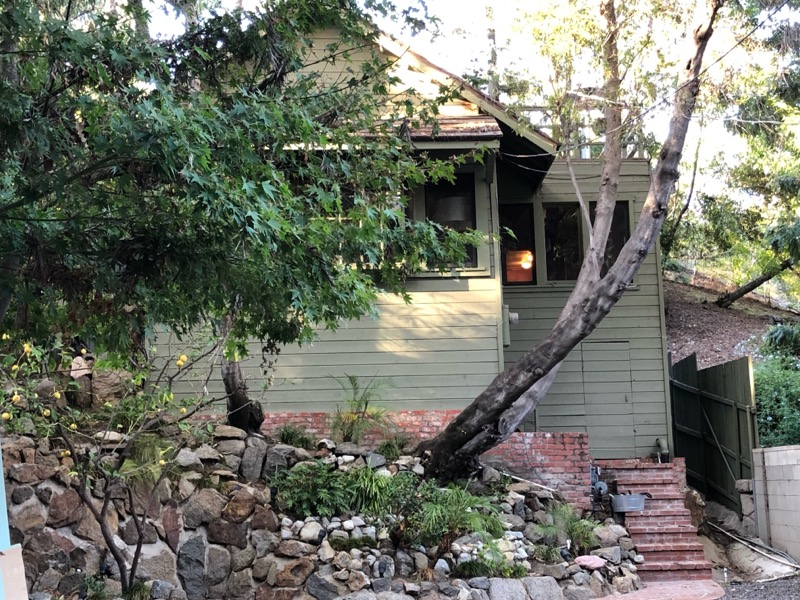
Laurel Canyon, 8217 Lookout Mountain Avenue, Joni Mitchell's house from 1969 to 1974; photograph taken in 2022

In March 1970, Clouds produced her first Grammy Award for Best Folk Performance. The following month, Reprise released her third album, Ladies of the Canyon. Mitchell's sound was already beginning to expand beyond the confines of acoustic folk music and toward pop and rock, with more overdubs, percussion, and backing vocals, and for the first time, many songs composed on piano, which became a hallmark of Mitchell's style in her most popular era. Her own version of "Woodstock", slower than the cover by Crosby, Stills, Nash & Young, was performed solo on a Wurlitzer electric piano. The album also included the already-familiar song "The Circle Game" and the environmental anthem "Big Yellow Taxi", with its famous lines, "they paved paradise and put up a parking lot", and "don't it always seem to go, that you don't know what you got till it's gone?".

Ladies of the Canyon was an instant smash on FM radio and sold briskly, eventually becoming Mitchell's first gold album (selling over a half million copies). She made a decision to stop touring for a year and just write and paint, yet she was still voted "Top Female Performer" for 1970 by Melody Maker, a leading UK pop music magazine. On the April 1971 release of James Taylor's Mud Slide Slim and the Blue Horizon album, Mitchell is credited with backup vocals on the track "You've Got a Friend". The songs she wrote during the months she took off for travel and life experience appeared on her next album, Blue, released in June 1971. Comparing Joni Mitchell's talent to his own, David Crosby said, "By the time she did Blue, she was past me and rushing toward the horizon".

Blue was an almost instant critical and commercial success, peaking in the top 20 of the Billboard albums chart in September and also hitting the British Top 3. The lushly produced "Carey" was the single at the time, but musically, other parts of Blue departed further from the sounds of Ladies of the Canyon. Simpler, rhythmic acoustic parts allowed a focus on Mitchell's voice and emotions ("All I Want", "A Case of You"), while others such as "Blue", "River" and "The Last Time I Saw Richard" were sung to her rolling piano accompaniment. Her most confessional album, Mitchell later said of Blue, "I have, on occasion, sacrificed myself and my own emotional makeup, ... singing 'I'm selfish and I'm sad', for instance. We all suffer for our loneliness, but at the time of Blue, our pop stars never admitted these things." In its lyrics, the album was regarded as an inspired culmination of her early work, with depressed assessments of the world around her serving as counterpoint to exuberant expressions of romantic love (for example, in "California"). Mitchell later remarked, "At that period of my life, I had no personal defenses. I felt like a cellophane wrapper on a pack of cigarettes. I felt like I had absolutely no secrets from the world and I couldn't pretend in my life to be strong."

=== 1972–1975: For the Roses and Court and Spark ===
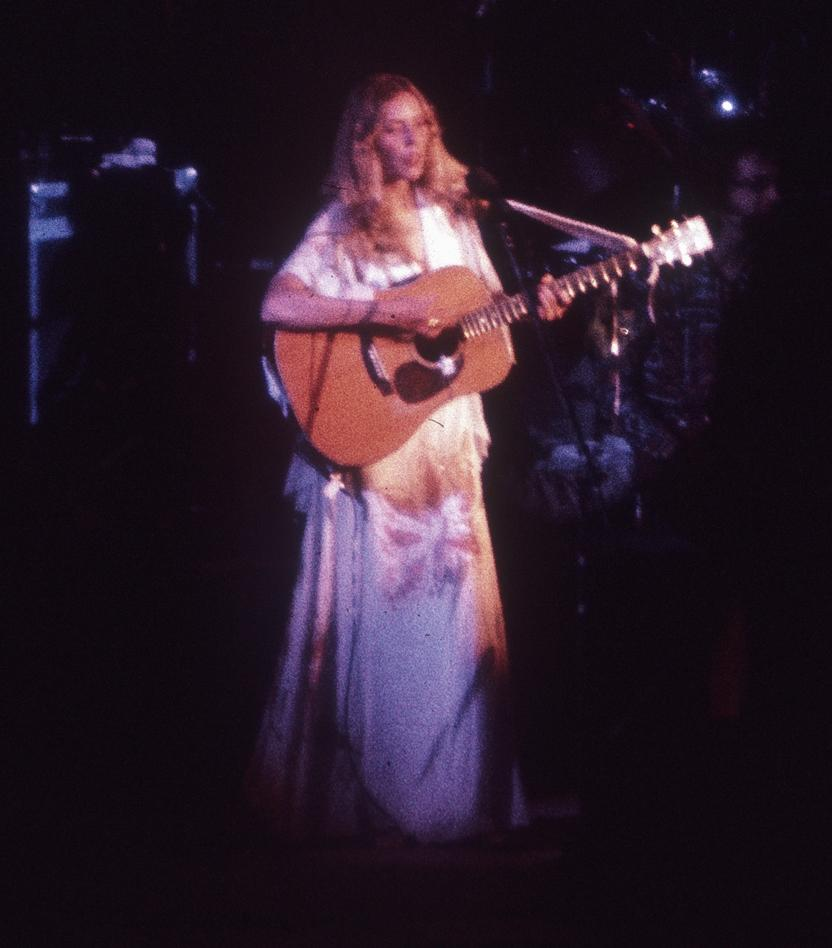
Mitchell performing at the Anaheim Convention Center in 1974

Mitchell decided to return to the live stage after the great success of Blue, and she presented new songs on tour which appeared on her next album, her fifth, For the Roses. The album was released in October 1972 and immediately zoomed up the charts. She followed with the single, "You Turn Me On, I'm a Radio", which peaked at No. 25 in the Billboard charts in February 1973.

Court and Spark, released in January 1974, saw Mitchell begin the flirtation with jazz and jazz fusion that marked her experimental period ahead. Court and Spark went to No. 1 on the Cashbox Album Charts. The LP made Mitchell a widely popular act for perhaps the only time in her career, on the strength of popular tracks such as the rocker "Raised on Robbery", which was released right before Christmas 1973, and "Help Me", which was released in March of the following year, and became Mitchell's only Top 10 single when it peaked at No. 7 in the first week of June. "Free Man in Paris" was another hit single and staple in her catalogue.

While recording Court and Spark, Mitchell had tried to make a clean break with her earlier folk sound, producing the album herself and employing jazz/pop fusion band the L.A. Express as what she called her first real backing group. In February 1974, her tour with the L.A. Express began, and they received rave notices as they travelled across the United States and Canada during the next two months. A series of shows at L.A.'s Universal Amphitheater from August 14–17 were recorded for a live album. In November, Mitchell released that album, Miles of Aisles, a two-record set including all but two songs from the L.A. concerts (one selection each from the Berkeley Community Theatre, on March 2, and the L.A. Music Center, on March 4, were also included in the set). The live album slowly moved up to No. 2, matching Court and Spark's chart peak on Billboard. "Big Yellow Taxi", the live version, was also released as a single and did reasonably well (she released another version of the song in 2007).

In January 1975, Court and Spark received four nominations for Grammy Awards, including Grammy Award for Album of the Year, for which Mitchell was the only woman nominated. She won only the Grammy Award for Best Arrangement, Instrumental and Vocals.

=== 1975–1977: The Hissing of Summer Lawns and Hejira ===
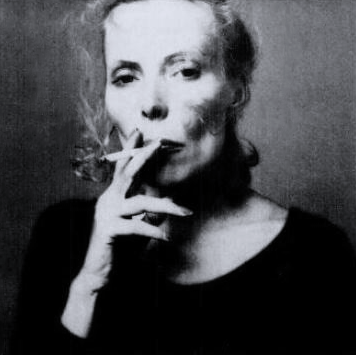
Mitchell in 1975

Mitchell went into the studio in early 1975 to record acoustic demos of some songs that she had written since the Court and Spark tour. A few months later she recorded versions of the tunes with her band. Her musical interests were diverging from both the folk and the pop scene of the era, toward less structured, more jazz-inspired pieces, with a wider range of instruments. The new song cycle was released in November 1975 as The Hissing of Summer Lawns. On "The Jungle Line", she made an early effort at sampling a recording of African musicians, something that became more commonplace among Western rock acts in the 1980s. "In France They Kiss on Main Street" continued the lush pop sounds of Court and Spark, and efforts such as the title song and "Edith and the Kingpin" chronicled the underbelly of suburban lives in Southern California.

During 1975, Mitchell also participated in several concerts in the Rolling Thunder Revue tours featuring Bob Dylan and Joan Baez, and in 1976 she performed as part of The Last Waltz by the Band. In January 1977, Mitchell received a nomination for the Grammy Award for Best Female Pop Vocal Performance for the album The Hissing of Summer Lawns, though the 1977 Grammy for that category went to Linda Ronstadt.

In early 1976, Mitchell travelled with friends who were driving cross country to Maine. Afterwards, she drove back to California alone and composed several songs during her journey which featured on her next album, 1976's Hejira. She stated that "This album was written mostly while I was traveling in the car. That's why there were no piano songs ..." Hejira was arguably Mitchell's most experimental album so far, owing to her ongoing collaborations with jazz virtuoso bass guitarist Jaco Pastorius on several songs, namely the first single, "Coyote", the atmospheric "Hejira", the disorienting, guitar-heavy "Black Crow", and the album's last song "Refuge of the Roads". The album climbed to No. 13 on the Billboard Charts, reaching gold status three weeks after release, and received airplay from album-oriented FM rock stations. Yet "Coyote", backed with "Blue Motel Room", failed to chart on the Hot 100. Hejira "did not sell as briskly as Mitchell's earlier, more 'radio-friendly' albums, [but] its stature in her catalogue has grown over the years". Mitchell herself believes the album to be unique. In 2006 she said, "I suppose a lot of people could have written a lot of my other songs, but I feel the songs on Hejira could only have come from me."

=== 1977–1980: Don Juan's Reckless Daughter and Mingus ===
Mitchell in blackface while performing "Furry Sings the Blues" during her 1980 concert film Shadows and Light.

In mid-1977, Mitchell began work on new recordings that became her first double studio album, Don Juan's Reckless Daughter. Close to completing her contract with Asylum Records, Mitchell felt that this album could be looser in feel than any album she had done in the past. She invited Pastorius back, and he brought with him fellow members of jazz fusion pioneers Weather Report, including drummer Don Alias and saxophonist Wayne Shorter. Layered, atmospheric compositions such as "Overture/Cotton Avenue" featured more improvisatory collaboration, while "Paprika Plains" was a 16-minute epic that stretched the boundaries of pop, owing more to Mitchell's memories of childhood in Canada and her study of classical music. "Dreamland" and "The Tenth World", featuring Chaka Khan on backing vocals, were percussion-dominated tracks. Other songs continued the jazz-rock-folk collisions of Hejira. Mitchell also revived "Jericho", written years earlier (a version is found on her 1974 live album) but never recorded in a studio setting. The album was released in December 1977, receiving mixed reviews but selling relatively well, peaking at No. 25 in the US and going gold within three months.

Mitchell wore blackface and a pimp outfit on the album cover, one of the most controversial moments of her career that has been widely criticized as racist. She called her blackface alter ego "Art Nouveau", inspired by a black man who once complimented her while walking down an LA street. She wore blackface several more times throughout her career and has consistently defended her use of it as late as 2017. However, in 2024, the album cover art on streaming services and physical reissues was changed to a photo of Mitchell's face seemingly inside the open mouth of a wolflike dog, an outtake from the 1985 photo sessions for the later album Dog Eat Dog. No announcement was made about the change nor any official reason given, and Mitchell has not commented on the matter.

A few months after the release of Don Juan's Reckless Daughter, Mitchell was contacted by the esteemed jazz composer, bandleader and bassist Charles Mingus, who had heard the orchestrated song "Paprika Plains", and wanted her to work with him. She began a collaboration with Mingus, who died before the project was completed in 1979. She finished the tracks, and the resulting album, Mingus, was released in June 1979, though it was poorly received in the press. Fans were confused over such a major change in Mitchell's overall sound, and though the album topped out at No. 17 on the Billboard albums chart—a higher placement than Don Juan's Reckless Daughter—Mingus still fell short of gold status, making it her first album since the 1960s not to sell at least half a million copies.

Mitchell's tour to promote Mingus began in August 1979 in Oklahoma City and concluded six weeks later with five shows at Los Angeles' Greek Theatre and one at the Santa Barbara County Bowl, where she recorded and filmed the concert. It was her first tour in several years, and with Pastorius, jazz guitarist Pat Metheny, and other members of her band, Mitchell also performed songs from her other jazz-inspired albums. When the tour ended she began a year of work, turning the tapes from the Santa Barbara County Bowl show into a two-album set and a concert film, both to be called Shadows and Light. Her final release on Asylum Records and her second live double album, it was released in September 1980, and made it up to No. 38 on the Billboard charts. A single from the LP, "Why Do Fools Fall in Love?", Mitchell's duet with The Persuasions (her opening act for the tour), bubbled under on Billboard, just missing the Hot 100.

=== 1981–1987: Wild Things Run Fast, Dog Eat Dog, and second marriage ===
For a year and a half, Mitchell worked on the tracks for her next album.

While the album was being readied for release, her friend David Geffen, founder of Asylum Records, decided to start a new label, Geffen Records. Still distributed by Warner Bros. (who controlled Asylum Records), Geffen negated the remaining contractual obligations Mitchell had with Asylum and signed her to his new label. Wild Things Run Fast (1982) marked a return to pop songwriting, including "Chinese Cafe/Unchained Melody", which incorporated the chorus and parts of the melody of the famous The Righteous Brothers hit, and "(You're So Square) Baby I Don't Care", a remake of the Elvis chestnut, which charted higher than any Mitchell single since her 1970s sales peak when it climbed to No. 47 on the charts. The album peaked on the Billboard charts in its fifth week at No. 25. During this period she recorded with bassist and sound engineer Larry Klein, whom she married in 1982.

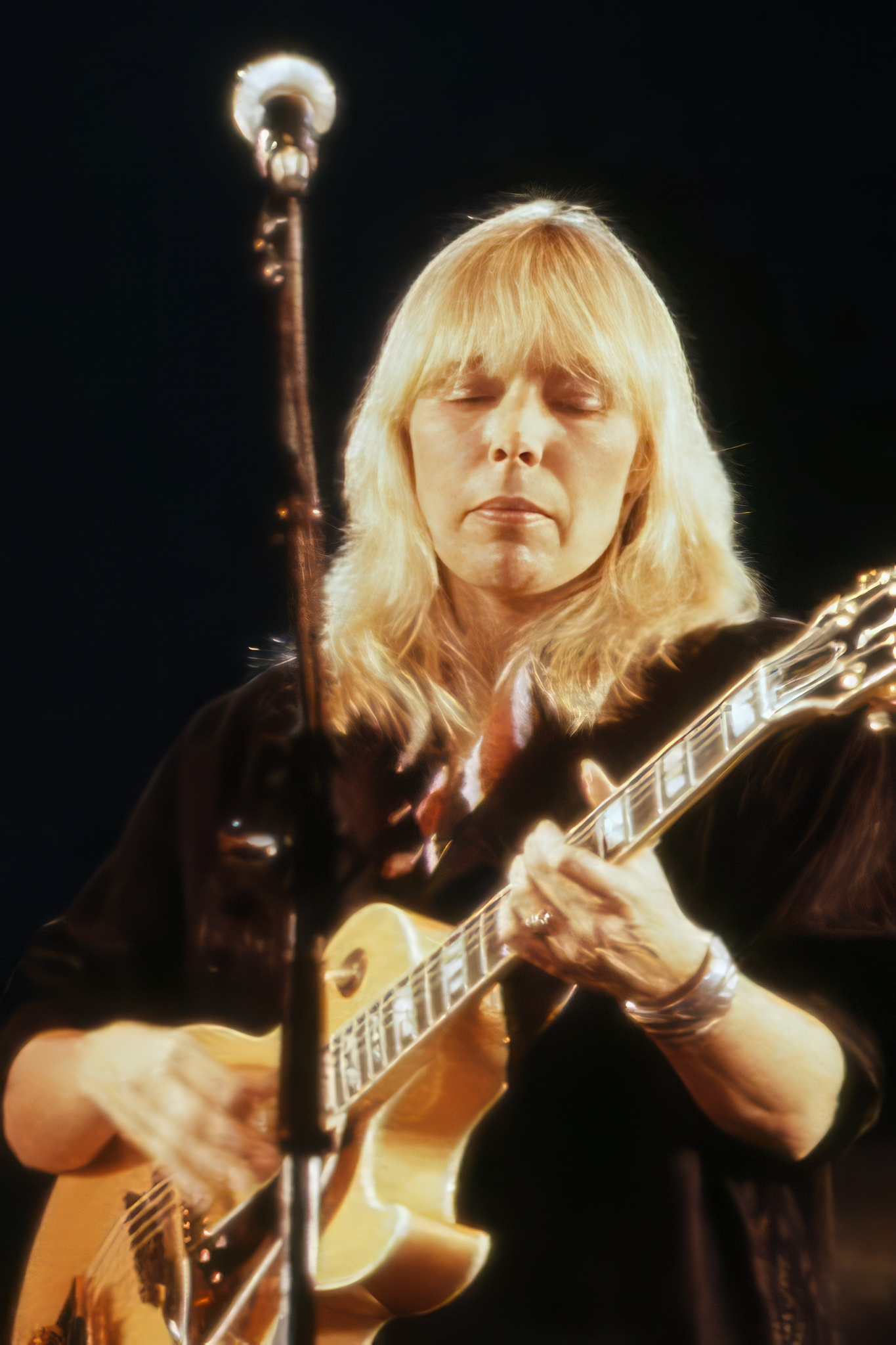
Mitchell performing in 1983

In early 1983, Mitchell began her "Refuge" world tour, visiting Japan, Australia, New Zealand, Ireland, the United Kingdom, Belgium, France, Germany, Italy and Scandinavia and then going back to the United States. A performance from the tour was videotaped and later released on home video (and later DVD) as Refuge of the Roads. As 1984 ended, Mitchell was writing new songs when she received a suggestion from Geffen that perhaps an outside producer with experience in the modern technical arenas that they wanted to explore might be a worthy addition. Mitchell hired the British synthpop musician Thomas Dolby to assist with synthesizers and production, but found working with him difficult: "I was reluctant when Thomas was suggested because he had been asked to produce the record [by Geffen], and would he consider coming in as just a programmer and a player? So on that level we did have some problems ... He may be able to do it faster. He may be able to do it better, but the fact is that it then wouldn't really be my music."

Dog Eat Dog, released in October 1985, was only a moderate seller, reaching No. 63 on Billboard's Top Albums Chart, Mitchell's lowest chart position since her first album peaked at No. 189 almost eighteen years before. One of the songs on the album, "Tax Free", created controversy by lambasting "televangelists" and what she saw as a drift to the religious right in American politics. "The churches came after me", she wrote, "they attacked me, though the Episcopalian Church, which I've seen described as the only church in America which actually uses its head, wrote me a letter of congratulation."

=== 1988–1993: Chalk Mark in a Rain Storm and Night Ride Home ===
Mitchell continued experimenting with synthesizers, drum machines and sequencers for the recordings of her next album, 1988's Chalk Mark in a Rain Storm. She also collaborated with artists including Willie Nelson, Billy Idol, Wendy & Lisa, Tom Petty, Don Henley, Peter Gabriel, and Benjamin Orr of the Cars. The album's first official single, "My Secret Place", was a duet with Gabriel, and reached the top 50 on the Canadian singles chart. The song "Lakota" was one of many songs on the album to take on larger political themes, in this case the Wounded Knee incident, the deadly battle between Native American activists and the FBI on Pine Ridge Indian Reservation in the previous decade. Musically, several songs fit into the trend of world music popularized by Gabriel during the era. Reviews were mostly favourable towards the album, and the cameos by well-known musicians brought it considerable attention. Chalk Mark ultimately improved on the chart performance of Dog Eat Dog, peaking at No. 45.

In 1990, Mitchell, who by then rarely performed live, participated in Roger Waters' The Wall Concert in Berlin. She performed the song "Goodbye Blue Sky" and was also one of the performers on the concert's final song "The Tide Is Turning" along with Waters, Cyndi Lauper, Bryan Adams, Van Morrison and Paul Carrack.

Throughout the first half of 1990, Mitchell recorded songs that appeared on her next album. She delivered the final mixes for the new album to Geffen just before Christmas, after trying nearly a hundred different sequences for the songs. The album Night Ride Home was released in March 1991. In the United States, it premiered on Billboard's Top Albums chart at No. 68, moving up to No. 48 in its second week, and peaking at No. 41 in its sixth week. In the United Kingdom, the album premiered at No. 25 on the albums chart. Critically, it was better received than her 1980s work. This album was also Mitchell's first since Geffen Records was sold to MCA Inc., meaning that Night Ride Home was her first album not to be initially distributed by WEA (now Warner Music Group).

=== 1994–1999: Turbulent Indigo, Taming the Tiger, and divorce ===
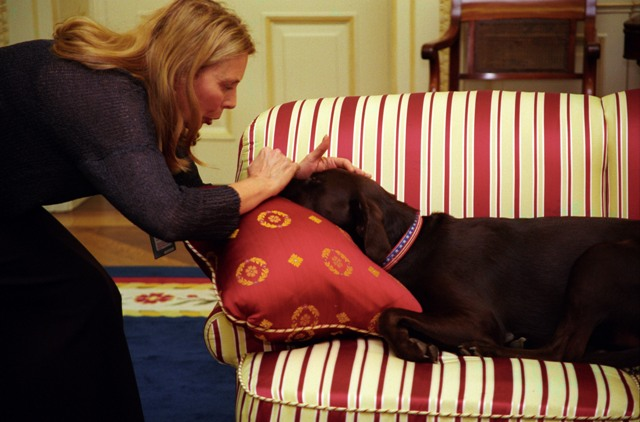
Mitchell pets President Clinton's dog Buddy in the Oval Office in 1998

To wider audiences, the real return to form for Mitchell came with 1994's Grammy-winning Turbulent Indigo. The recording of the album coincided with the end of Mitchell's marriage to musician Larry Klein after 12 years; Klein was also co-producer of the album.

Indigo was seen as Mitchell's most accessible set of songs in years. Songs such as "Sex Kills", "Sunny Sunday", "Borderline" and "The Magdalene Laundries" mixed social commentary and guitar-focused melodies for "a startling comeback". The album won two Grammy awards, including Best Pop Album, and it coincided with a much-publicized resurgence in interest in Mitchell's work by a younger generation of singer-songwriters.

In 1996, Mitchell agreed to release a greatest Hits collection, despite initial concerns that such a release would damage sales of her catalogue. Reprise also agreed to release a second album, called Misses, that would include some of the lesser-known songs from her career. Hits charted at No. 161 in the US, and achieved gold certification in the UK and Australia. Mitchell also included on Hits, for the first time on an album, her first recording, a version of "Urge for Going" which preceded Song to a Seagull but was previously released only as a B-side.

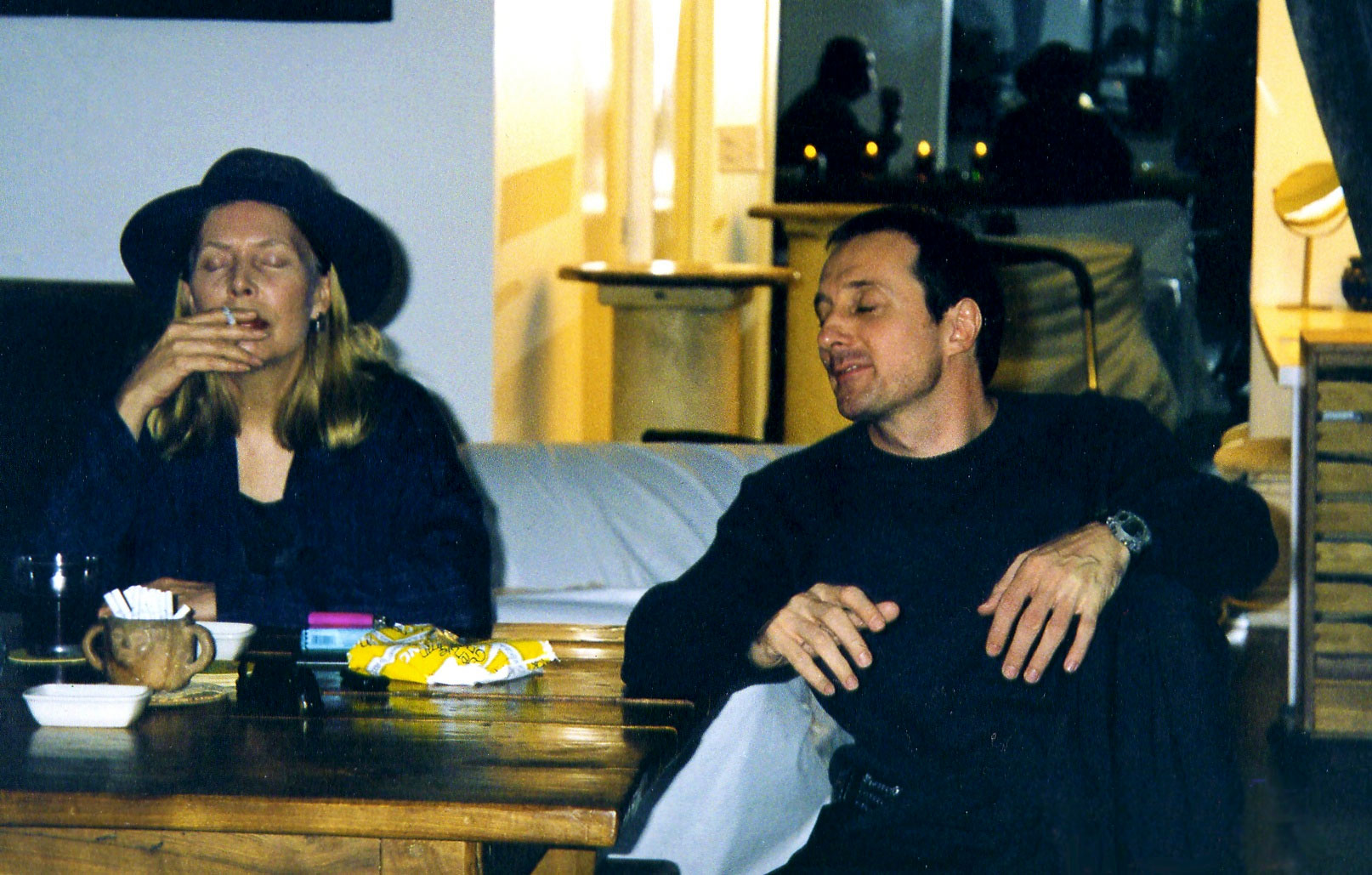
Joni Mitchell and Peter Bogner listening to premix of Herbie Hancock's Gershwin's World (Venice Beach, California, in 1999)

Two years later, Mitchell released her final set of "original" new work before nearly a decade of other pursuits, 1998's Taming the Tiger. She promoted Tiger with a return to regular concert appearances, including a co-headlining tour with Bob Dylan and Van Morrison.

On the album, Mitchell had played a custom guitar equipped with a Roland hexaphonic pick-up that connected to a Roland VG-8 modelling processor. The device allowed Mitchell to play any of her many alternate tunings without having to re-tune the guitar. The guitar's output, through the VG-8, was transposed to any of her tunings in real-time.

It was around this time that critics also began to notice a real change in Mitchell's voice, particularly on her older songs; the singer later confirmed the change, explaining that "I'd go to hit a note and there was nothing there". While her more limited range and huskier vocals have sometimes been attributed to her smoking (she was described by journalist Robin Eggar as "one of the world's last great smokers"), Mitchell believes that the changes in her voice that became noticeable in the 1990s were because of other problems, including vocal nodules, a compressed larynx, and the lingering effects of having had polio. In an interview in 2004, she denied that "my terrible habits" had anything to do with her more limited range, and pointed out that singers often lose the upper register when they pass fifty. In addition, she contended that her voice had acquired a more interesting and expressive alto range when she could no longer hit the high notes, let alone hold them as she had in her youth.

=== 2000–2005: Both Sides Now, retirement tour and retrospectives ===
The singer's next two albums featured no new songs and, Mitchell has said, were recorded to "fulfill contractual obligations", but on both she attempted to make use of her new vocal range in interpreting familiar material. Both Sides Now (2000) was an album composed mostly of covers of jazz standards, performed with an orchestra, featuring orchestral arrangements by Vince Mendoza. The album also contained remakes of "A Case of You" and the title track "Both Sides, Now", two early hits transposed down to Mitchell's new dusky, soulful alto range. It received mostly strong reviews and motivated a short national tour, with Mitchell accompanied by a core band featuring her ex-husband Larry Klein on bass plus a local orchestra on each tour stop. Its success led to 2002's Travelogue, a collection of re-workings of her previous songs with lush orchestral accompaniments.

Mitchell stated at the time that Travelogue would be her final album. In a 2002 interview with Rolling Stone, she voiced discontent with the state of the music industry, describing it as a "cesspool". Mitchell expressed her dislike of the record industry's dominance and her desire to control her own destiny, possibly by releasing her own music over the Internet.

During the next few years, the only albums Mitchell released were compilations of her earlier work. In 2003, her Geffen recordings were collected in a remastered four-disc box set, The Complete Geffen Recordings, including notes by Mitchell and three previously unreleased tracks. A series of themed compilations of songs from earlier albums were also released: The Beginning of Survival (2004), Dreamland (2004), and Songs of a Prairie Girl (2005), the last of which collected the threads of her Canadian upbringing and which she released after accepting an invitation to the Saskatchewan Centennial concert in Saskatoon. The concert, which featured a tribute to Mitchell, was also attended by Queen Elizabeth II. In the Prairie Girl liner notes, she wrote that the collection is "my contribution to Saskatchewan's Centennial celebrations".

In the early 1990s, Mitchell signed a deal with Random House to publish an autobiography. In 1998 she told The New York Times that her memoirs were "in the works", that they would be published in as many as four volumes, and that the first line would be "I was the only black man at the party." In 2005, Mitchell said that she was using a tape recorder to get her memories "down in the oral tradition".

=== 2006–2010: Shine and other late recordings ===
In an interview with the Ottawa Citizen in October 2006, Mitchell "revealed that she was recording her first collection of new songs in nearly a decade", but gave few other details. Four months later, in an interview with The New York Times, Mitchell said that the forthcoming album, titled Shine, was inspired by the war in Iraq and "something her grandson had said while listening to family fighting: 'Bad dreams are good—in the great plan.'" Early media reports characterized the album as having "a minimal feel ... that harks back to [Mitchell's] early work" and a focus on political and environmental issues.

In February 2007, Mitchell returned to Calgary and served as an advisor for the Alberta Ballet Company premiere of "The Fiddle and the Drum", a dance choreographed by Jean Grand-Maître to both new and old songs. She worked with the French-Canadian TV director Mario Rouleau, well known for work in art and dance for television, such as Cirque du Soleil. She also filmed portions of the rehearsals for a documentary that she was working on. Of the flurry of recent activity she quipped, "I've never worked so hard in my life."

In mid-2007, Mitchell's official fan-run site confirmed speculation that she had signed a two-record deal with Starbucks' Hear Music label. Shine was released by the label on September 25, 2007, debuting at number 14 on the Billboard 200 album chart, her highest chart position in the United States since the release of Hejira in 1976, over thirty years previously, and at number 36 on the United Kingdom albums chart. On the same day, Herbie Hancock, a longtime associate and friend of Mitchell, released River: The Joni Letters, an album paying tribute to Mitchell's work. Among the album's contributors were Norah Jones, Tina Turner, Leonard Cohen, and Mitchell herself, who contributed a vocal to the re-recording of "The Tea Leaf Prophecy (Lay Down Your Arms)" (originally on her album Chalk Mark in a Rain Storm). On February 10, 2008, Hancock's recording won Album of the Year at the Grammy Awards. It was the first time in 43 years that a jazz artist had taken the top prize at the annual award ceremony. In accepting the award, Hancock paid tribute to Mitchell as well as to Miles Davis and John Coltrane. At the same ceremony Mitchell won a Grammy for Best Instrumental Pop Performance for the opening track, "One Week Last Summer", from her album Shine.

In 2009, Mitchell stated she had the skin condition Morgellons and that she would leave the music industry to work toward giving more credibility to people who suffer from Morgellons.

In a 2010 interview with the Los Angeles Times, Mitchell was quoted as saying that singer-songwriter Bob Dylan, with whom she had worked closely in the past, was a fake and a plagiarist. The controversial remark was widely reported by other media. Mitchell did not explain the contention further, but several media outlets speculated that it may have related to the allegations of plagiarism surrounding some lyrics on Dylan's 2006 album Modern Times. In a 2013 interview with Jian Ghomeshi, she was asked about the comments and responded by denying that she had made the statement. She also mentioned the allegations of plagiarism that arose over the lyrics to Dylan's 2001 album Love and Theft, in the general context of the flow and ebb of the creative process of artists.

=== 2010–2022: Health problems, recovery, and archival projects ===
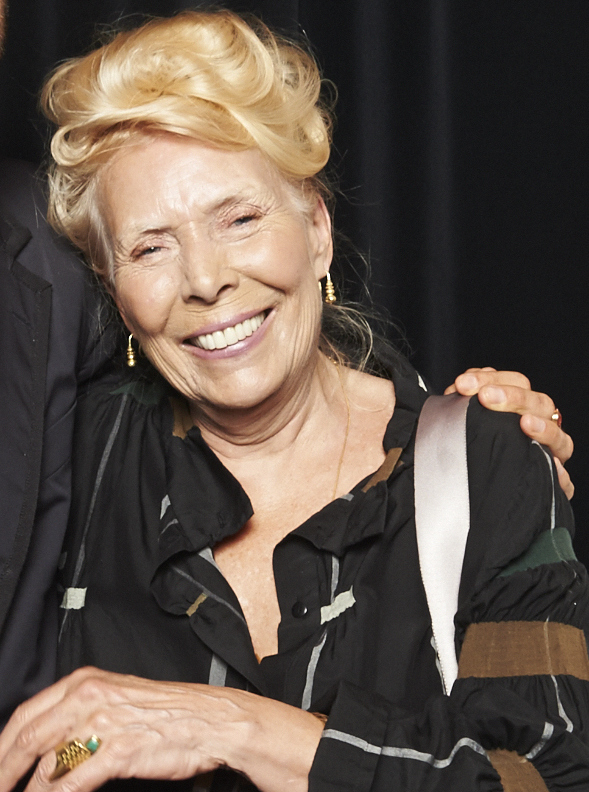
Mitchell in 2013

Although Mitchell said that she would no longer tour or give concerts, she made occasional public appearances to speak on environmental issues. Mitchell divides her time between her longtime home in Los Angeles, and the 80-acre (32 ha) property in Sechelt, British Columbia, that she has owned since the early 1970s. "L.A. is my workplace", she said in 2006, "B.C. is my heartbeat". Since 2011, she said she focuses mainly on her visual art, which she does not sell and displays only on rare occasions.

In March 2015, Mitchell suffered a brain aneurysm rupture, which required her to undergo physical therapy and take part in daily rehabilitation. Mitchell made her first public appearance following the aneurysm when she attended a Chick Corea concert in Los Angeles in August 2016. She made a few other appearances, and in November 2018 David Crosby said that she was learning to walk again.

Since 2018, Mitchell has approved a number of archival projects. In September 2018, Eagle Rock Entertainment released the Murray Lerner-directed documentary Both Sides Now: Live at the Isle of Wight Festival 1970, which included restored video footage and previously unseen interviews with Mitchell, plus a separate program featuring the complete concert uninterrupted. On November 2, 2018, Mitchell released an 8-LP vinyl reissue of Love Has Many Faces: A Quartet, A Ballet, Waiting to Be Danced. A limited-edition blue vinyl edition of Blue followed in January 2019.

On November 7, 2018, Mitchell attended the Joni 75: A Birthday Celebration concert in Los Angeles. To celebrate her 75th birthday, artists Brandi Carlile, Emmylou Harris, James Taylor, Chaka Khan, Graham Nash, Seal, Kris Kristofferson, and others interpreted songs written by Mitchell. Fellow Canadian artist Diana Krall offered two performances. Selections from that night's performances were released on DVD, along with a separate CD release. A vinyl edition of the album was released for Record Store Day in April 2019. Mitchell later attended another tribute concert, Songs Are Like Tattoos, which featured Joni 75 participant Brandi Carlile performing Mitchell's Blue album in full.

Mitchell approved Joni: The Joni Mitchell Sessions, a book of photos taken and collected by Norman Seeff, released in November 2018. Mitchell also revisited her poetry with Morning Glory on the Vine, a collection of facsimile handwritten lyrics, poetry and artwork originally compiled in 1971 as a gift for friends and family. The expanded and reformatted wide-release edition of Morning Glory on the Vine was published on October 22, 2019, in a standard hardcover edition, as well as a limited signed edition.

In September 2020, it was announced that Mitchell and Rhino Records had created the Joni Mitchell Archives, a series of catalogue releases containing material from the singer's personal vaults. The project's first release, a five-disc collection titled Joni Mitchell Archives – Vol. 1: The Early Years (1963–1967), followed on October 30, 2020. In April 2022 Mitchell received a Grammy Award for 'Best Historical Album' for this release. She showed up personally to collect the award. On the same day, Mitchell released Early Joni – 1963 and Live at Canterbury House – 1967 (both culled from the 5-CD box set) as standalone vinyl releases.

A special remastered collection of Mitchell's first four albums (Song to a Seagull, Clouds, Ladies of the Canyon and Blue) was released on July 2, 2021, as The Reprise Albums (1968–1971). The collection is the first to feature a new mix of Mitchell's 1968 debut album, overseen by Mitchell herself. Commenting on the original mix of Song to a Seagull, Mitchell called it "atrocious" and said it sounded like it "had been recorded under a bowl of Jello".

On January 28, 2022, Mitchell demanded that Spotify remove her songs from its streaming service in solidarity with her long-time friend and fellow childhood polio survivor Neil Young, who removed his tracks from the streaming platform in protest against COVID-19 misinformation on the popular Spotify-hosted podcast The Joe Rogan Experience. She wrote on her website: "Irresponsible people are spreading lies that are costing people their lives. I stand in solidarity with Neil Young and the global scientific and medical communities on this issue." British National Health Service doctor and author Rachel Clarke tweeted: "Both Neil Young & Joni Mitchell … know painfully well how much harm, suffering & avoidable death anti-vaxxers can cause."

On April 1, 2022, Mitchell was honoured as the 2022 MusiCares Person of the Year by the Recording Academy. Mitchell was present at the Awards show accepting the award personally.

=== Since 2022: Return to live performances ===
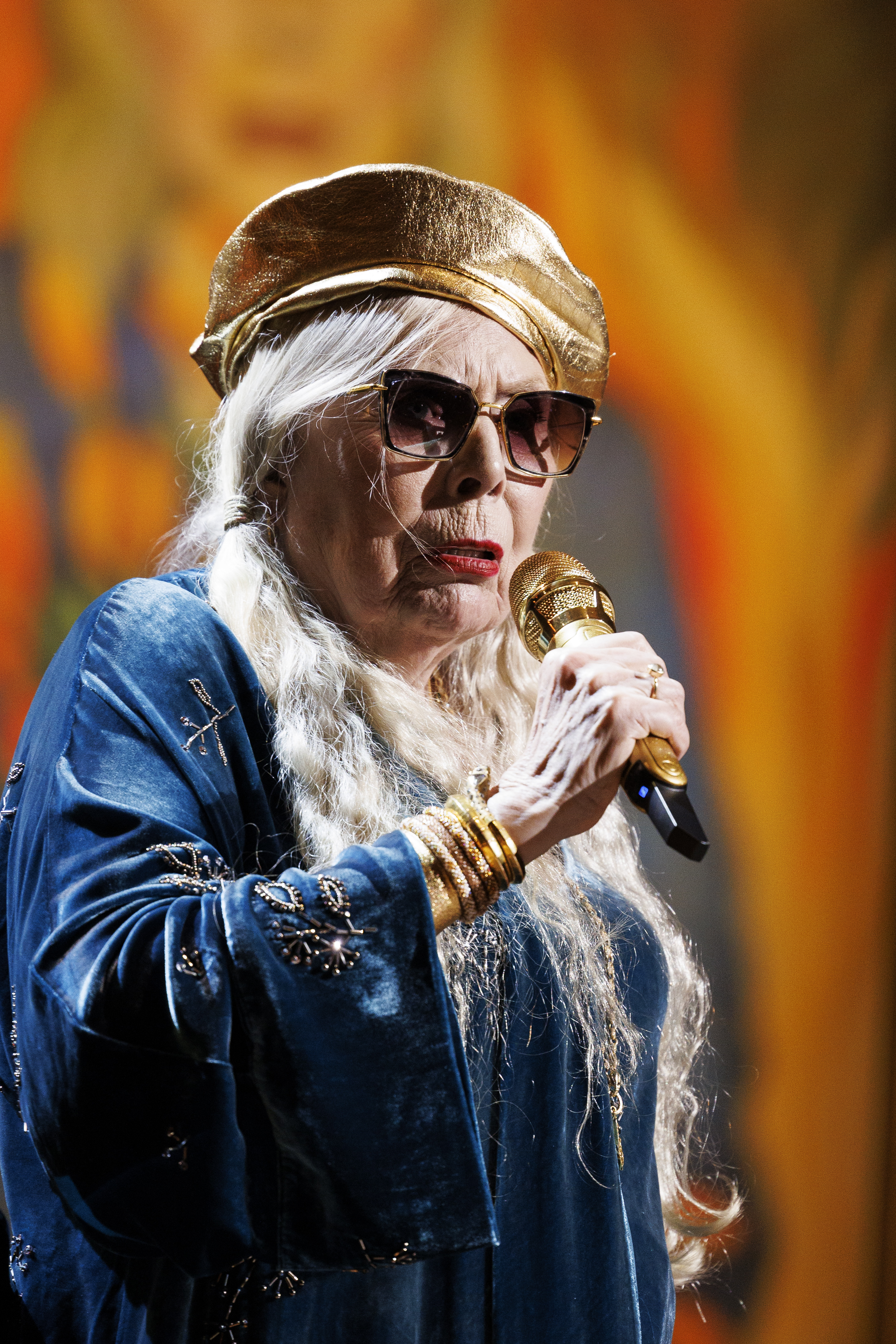
Mitchell performing in 2023

On July 24, 2022, Joni Mitchell appeared unannounced as a special guest in the closing performance of the final day of the Newport Folk Festival in Rhode Island, where she had first played in 1967, as part of a set billed as "Brandi Carlile and Friends". Supported by a group of well-wisher musicians, she participated in a 13-song set of her own material and covers, including one that she played as a solo on electric guitar.

In 2017, Mitchell had been inspired by a music-making visit from an old friend, singer-songwriter Eric Andersen, to begin hosting monthly music sessions at her home in Laurel Canyon. The sessions became known as "Joni Jams". Brandi Carlile organized the sessions and recruited musicians, and among those who came over the years to play music and sing in Mitchell's living room were Elton John, Paul McCartney, Bonnie Raitt, Harry Styles, Chaka Khan, Marcus Mumford, Herbie Hancock, Jess Wolfe, Holly Laessig, Taylor Goldsmith, Blake Mills, and Hozier.

Mitchell was delighted by the return of music to her home. The music sessions raised her spirits and assisted her recovery from the serious and disabling aneurysm she had suffered in 2015, and she began to sing in the sessions and learn to play guitar again. As her health improved, a return to live performance began to seem possible, plans were cautiously laid, a set list was prepared; and in July 2022, after a rehearsal the night before, Mitchell joined Carlile and others on stage at the Newport Festival for a live Joni Jam, her first public performance in nine years.

Mitchell was given an ecstatic reception, and she said afterwards, "I was delighted and honoured. It gave me the bug for it." Songs performed included "Carey", "Come in from the Cold", "A Case of You", "Big Yellow Taxi", "Both Sides Now", "The Circle Game" and Gershwin and Heyward's "Summertime". After her appearance at Newport, Mitchell told Carlile, "I want to do another show. I want to play again." The Newport set was released as a live album in 2023 and won the Grammy Award for Best Folk Album in 2024.

On October 19, 2022, Carlile announced that Mitchell would play a headline concert, billed as "Joni Jam 2", in a weekend event at Washington State's Gorge Amphitheatre, "one of the most beautiful venues in the world", on June 10, 2023. Mitchell's last official headline shows had been on the Both Sides Now tour in 2000. Her 2023 appearance at Gorge Amphitheatre attracted a capacity audience of 27,000. In her first headline concert in 23 years, supported by 19 singers and musicians, Mitchell performed a nearly three-hour set of 21 songs plus a three-song encore in which she played guitar. Annie Lennox, who sang on "Ladies of the Canyon", said Mitchell was "a visionary, a legend and an inspiration."

Mitchell was awarded the 2023 Gershwin Prize for her lifetime contributions to popular music. She was celebrated with a concert on March 2 in Washington, D.C., where musicians taking part included Brandi Carlile, Annie Lennox, Angélique Kidjo, Herbie Hancock, Diana Krall, Cyndi Lauper, Graham Nash, James Taylor, Ledisi, Lucius, Marcus Mumford, Sara Bareilles and Celisse. Mitchell performed "Summertime" and participated in all-star renditions of her songs "Big Yellow Taxi" and "The Circle Game".

On February 4, 2024, Mitchell performed for the first time at the 66th Annual Grammy Awards, singing "Both Sides Now" accompanied by many of the musicians who perform at her private Joni Jams. Further Joni Jam concert dates were announced for Saturday October 19 and Sunday October 20, 2024, at the 18,000 capacity Hollywood Bowl, where Mitchell performed three-hour sets with Brandi Carlile, Marcus Mumford, Annie Lennox and numerous supporting musicians.

On March 22 of that year, Mitchell restored her music to Spotify after Neil Young did the same, thus ending her protest over Spotify's hosting of The Joe Rogan Experience.

The Juno Awards announced that Mitchell would receive a lifetime achievement award at its 2026 ceremony held on November 24, 2025, in Hamilton, Ontario. This was only the third time this award had been presented.

Mitchell was one of several celebrities who wore an "ICE Out" pin on their lapels during the February 1, 2026, Grammy Awards in order to protest recent actions of United States Immigration and Customs Enforcement (ICE). At the event, she won a Grammy for Best Historical Album for her retrospective collection Joni Mitchell Archives – Vol. 4: The Asylum Years (1976–1980).

Mitchell became a naturalized United States citizen on October 13, 2026, after living in the country for 62 years. On her Instagram account she posted a picture of herself holding an American flag. She also included a short video of being sworn in as a citizen. She has retained her Canadian citizenship, making her a dual citizen.

== Guitar playing style ==
External videos
- Dr. Joni Mitchell, 15:12, January 7, 2005, CBC Digital Archive
- The Joni Mitchell Interview, 1:44:54, June 11, 2013, q on CBC

While some of Mitchell's most popular songs were written on the piano, almost every song she composed on the guitar uses an open, or non-standard, tuning; she has written songs in some 50 tunings, playing what she has called "Joni's weird chords". The use of alternative tunings allows guitarists to produce accompaniment with more varied and wide-ranging textures. Her right-hand picking/strumming technique has evolved over the years from an initially intricate picking style, typified by the guitar songs on her first album, to a looser and more rhythmic style, sometimes incorporating percussive "slaps".

In 1995, Mitchell's friend Fred Walecki, proprietor of Westwood Music in Los Angeles, developed a solution to alleviate her continuing frustration with using multiple alternative tunings in live settings. Walecki designed a Stratocaster-style guitar to function with the Roland VG-8 virtual guitar, a system capable of configuring her numerous tunings electronically. While the guitar itself remained in standard tuning, the VG-8 encoded the pick-up signals into digital signals which were then translated into the altered tunings. This allowed Mitchell to use one guitar on stage, while an off-stage tech entered the preprogrammed tuning for each song in her set.

Mitchell was highly innovative harmonically in her early work (1966–1972), incorporating modality, chromaticism, and pedal points. On her 1968 debut album Song to a Seagull, Mitchell used both quartal and quintal harmony in "The Dawntreader" and quintal harmony in "Song to a Seagull".

In 2003, Rolling Stone named her the 72nd-greatest guitarist of all time; she was the highest-ranked woman on the list.

== Legacy and impact ==
Mitchell's approach to music struck a chord with many female listeners. In an era dominated by the stereotypical male rock star, she presented herself as "multidimensional and conflicted ... allow[ing] her to build such a powerful identification among her female fans". Mitchell asserted her desire for artistic control throughout her career, and still holds the publishing rights for her music. She has disclaimed the notion that she is a "feminist"; in a 2013 interview she rejected the label, stating, "I'm not a feminist. I don't want to get a posse against men. I'd rather go toe-to-toe; work it out." David Shumway notes that Mitchell "became the first woman in popular music to be recognized as an artist in the full sense of that term.... Whatever Mitchell's stated views of feminism, what she represents more than any other performer of her era is the new prominence of women's perspectives in cultural and political life."

Mitchell's work has had a significant influence on many other artists, including Taylor Swift, Björk, Prince, Ellie Goulding, Harry Styles, Corinne Bailey Rae, Gabrielle Aplin, Mikael Åkerfeldt from Opeth, Pink Floyd's David Gilmour, Marillion members Steve Hogarth and Steve Rothery, their former vocalist and lyricist Fish, Paul Carrack, Haim, Lorde, Clairo and Gretta Ray. Madonna has also cited Mitchell as the first female artist that really spoke to her as a teenager; "I was really, really into Joni Mitchell. I knew every word to Court and Spark; I worshipped her when I was in high school. Blue is amazing. I would have to say of all the women I've heard, she had the most profound effect on me from a lyrical point of view."

Several artists have had success covering Mitchell's songs. Judy Collins's 1967 recording of "Both Sides, Now" reached No. 8 on Billboard charts and was a breakthrough in the career of both artists. (Mitchell's own recording did not see release until two years later, on her second album Clouds.) This is Mitchell's most-covered song by far, with over 1,200 versions recorded at latest count. Hole also covered "Both Sides, Now" in 1991 on their debut album, Pretty on the Inside, retitling it "Clouds", with the lyrics altered by frontwoman Courtney Love. Pop group Neighborhood in 1970 and Amy Grant in 1995 scored hits with covers of "Big Yellow Taxi", the third-most covered song in Mitchell's repertoire (with over 300 covers). More recent releases of this song included versions by Counting Crows in 2002 and Nena in 2007. Janet Jackson used a sample of the chorus of "Big Yellow Taxi" as the centerpiece of her 1997 hit single "Got 'Til It's Gone", which also features rapper Q-Tip saying "Joni Mitchell never lies". "River", from Mitchell's album Blue became the second-most covered song of Mitchell's in 2013 as many artists chose it for their holiday albums. Rap artists Kanye West and Mac Dre have also sampled Mitchell's vocals in their music. In addition, Annie Lennox has covered "Ladies of the Canyon" for the B-side of her 1995 hit "No More I Love You's". Mandy Moore covered "Help Me" in 2003. In 2004 singer George Michael covered her song "Edith and the Kingpin" for a radio show. "River" has been one of the most popular songs covered in recent years, with versions by Dianne Reeves (1999), James Taylor (recorded for television in 2000, and for CD release in 2004), Allison Crowe (2004), Rachael Yamagata (2004), Aimee Mann (2005), and Sarah McLachlan (2006). McLachlan also did a version of "Blue" in 1996, and Cat Power recorded a cover of "Blue" in 2008. Other Mitchell covers include the famous "Woodstock" by Crosby, Stills, Nash and Young, Eva Cassidy, and Matthews Southern Comfort; "This Flight Tonight" by Nazareth; and well-known versions of "A Case of You" by Tori Amos, Michelle Branch, Jane Monheit, Prince, Diana Krall, James Blake, and Ana Moura. A 40th anniversary version of "Woodstock" was released in 2009 by Nick Vernier Band featuring Ian Matthews (formerly of Matthews Southern Comfort). Fellow Canadian singer k.d. lang recorded two of Mitchell's songs ("A Case of You" and "Jericho") for her 2004 album Hymns of the 49th Parallel which is composed entirely of songs written by Canadian artists.

Prince's version of "A Case of U" appeared on A Tribute to Joni Mitchell, a 2007 compilation released by Nonesuch Records, which also featured Björk ("The Boho Dance"), Caetano Veloso ("Dreamland"), Emmylou Harris ("The Magdalene Laundries"), Sufjan Stevens ("Free Man in Paris") and Cassandra Wilson ("For the Roses"), among others.

Several other songs reference Joni Mitchell. The song "Our House" by Graham Nash refers to Nash's two-year relationship with Mitchell at the time that Crosby, Stills, Nash and Young recorded the Déjà Vu album. Led Zeppelin's "Going to California" was said to be written about Robert Plant and Jimmy Page's infatuation with Mitchell, a claim that seems to be borne out by the fact that, in live performances, Plant often says "Joni" after the line "To find a queen without a king, they say she plays guitar and cries and sings". Jimmy Page uses a double dropped D guitar tuning similar to the alternative tunings Mitchell uses. The Sonic Youth song "Hey Joni" is named for Mitchell. Alanis Morissette also mentions Mitchell in one of her songs, "Your House". British folk singer Frank Turner mentions Mitchell in his song "Sunshine State". The Prince song "The Ballad of Dorothy Parker" contains the lyric – "'Oh, my favourite song' she said – and it was Joni singing 'Help me I think I'm falling'". "Lavender" by Marillion was partly influenced by "going through parks listening to Joni Mitchell", according to vocalist and lyricist Fish, and she was later mentioned in the lyrics of their song "Montreal" from Sounds That Can't Be Made. John Mayer makes reference to Mitchell and her Blue album in his song "Queen of California", from his 2012 album Born and Raised. The song contains the lyric "Joni wrote Blue in a house by the sea". Taylor Swift also details Mitchell's departure from the music industry in her song "The Lucky One" from her 2012 album Red. In 2021, St. Vincent mentioned Joni Mitchell in her song about important women in the entertainment industry, "The Melting of the Sun".

In 2003, playwright Bryden MacDonald launched When All the Slaves Are Free, a musical revue based on Mitchell's music.

Mitchell's music and poems have deeply influenced the French painter Jacques Benoit's work. Between 1979 and 1989 Benoit produced sixty paintings, corresponding to a selection of fifty of Mitchell's songs.

Maynard James Keenan of the American progressive metal band Tool has cited Mitchell as an influence, claiming that her influence is what allows him to "soften [staccato, rhythmic, insane mathematical paths] and bring [them] back to the center, so you can listen to it without having an eye-ache." A Perfect Circle, another band featuring Keenan as lead vocalist, recorded a rendition of Mitchell's "The Fiddle and the Drum" on their 2004 album eMOTIVe, a collection of anti-war cover songs.

=== Biopic ===
On August 18, 2025 it was announced that Cameron Crowe will direct a biographical film based on the life and with Anya Taylor-Joy rumored to be playing the younger version of Mitchell. On January 31, 2026 it was confirmed that Meryl Streep will be portraying the older version of Mitchell in the biopic by record executive, Clive Davis. At the time, Cameron Crowe stated the project has been in the works for four years.

== Awards and honours ==
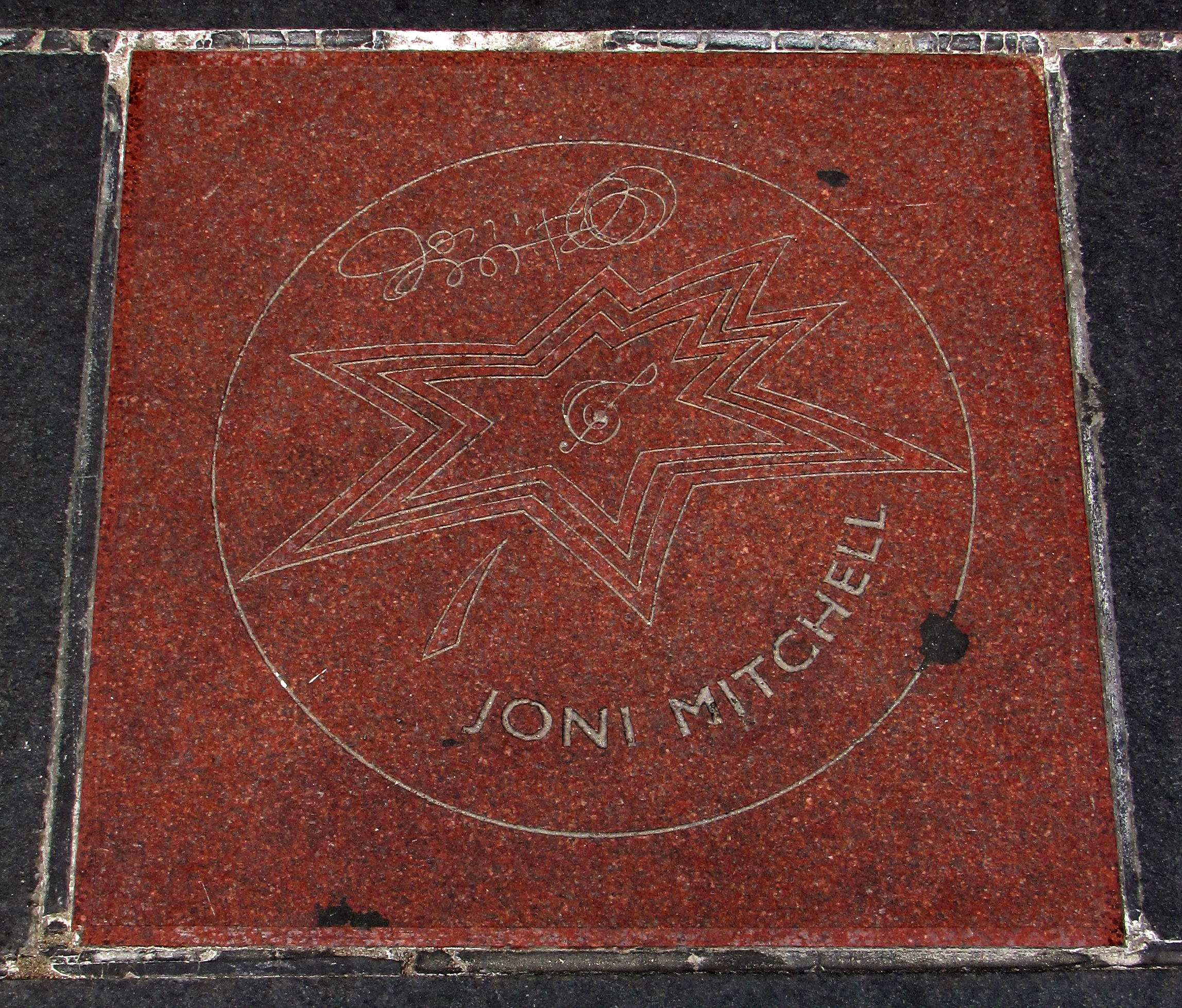
Joni Mitchell's star on Canada's Walk of Fame

Mitchell has received many honours from her home country of Canada. She was inducted into the Canadian Music Hall of Fame in 1981 and received the Governor General's Performing Arts Award for Lifetime Artistic Achievement, Canada's highest honour in the performing arts, in 1996. Mitchell received a star on Canada's Walk of Fame in 2000. In 2002 she was named a Companion of the Order of Canada, Canada's highest civilian honour. She received an honorary doctorate in music from McGill University in 2004. In January 2007 she was inducted into the Canadian Songwriters Hall of Fame. The Saskatchewan Recording Industry Association bestowed upon Joni their Lifetime Achievement Award in 1993. In June 2007 Canada Post featured Mitchell on a postage stamp.

Mitchell has received eleven Grammy Awards during her career (ten competitive, one honorary), the first in 1969 and the most recent in 2024 for Best Folk Album. She received a Grammy Lifetime Achievement Award in 2002, with the citation describing her as "one of the most important female recording artists of the rock era" and "a powerful influence on all artists who embrace diversity, imagination and integrity".

In 1995, Mitchell received Billboard's Century Award. In 1996, she was awarded the Polar Music Prize. In 1997, Mitchell was inducted into the Rock and Roll Hall of Fame, but did not attend the ceremony.

In tribute to Mitchell, the TNT network presented an all-star celebration at the Hammerstein Ballroom in New York City on April 6, 2000. Mitchell's songs were sung by many performers, including James Taylor, Elton John, Wynonna Judd, Bryan Adams, Cyndi Lauper, Diana Krall, and Richard Thompson. Mitchell herself ended the evening with a rendition of "Both Sides, Now" with a 70-piece orchestra. The version was featured on the soundtrack to the movie Love Actually.

In 2008, Mitchell was ranked 42nd on Rolling Stone's "100 Greatest Singers" list and in 2015 she was ranked ninth on their list of the 100 Greatest Songwriters of All Time.

On February 12, 2010, "Both Sides, Now" was performed at the 2010 Winter Olympics opening ceremony in Vancouver.

To celebrate Mitchell's 70th birthday, the 2013 Luminato Festival in Toronto held a set of tribute concerts entitled Joni: A Portrait in Song – A Birthday Happening Live at Massey Hall on June 18 and 19. Performers included Rufus Wainwright, Herbie Hancock, Esperanza Spalding, and rare performances by Mitchell herself.

Health problems prevented her from attending the San Francisco gala in May 2015 to receive the SFJAZZ Lifetime Achievement Award.

In 2018, the city of Saskatoon erected two plaques to commemorate her musical beginnings in the city. One was installed by the Broadway Theatre beside the former Louis Riel Coffee House, where Mitchell played her first paid gig. A second plaque was installed at River Landing, near the Remai Modern art gallery and Persephone Theatre performing arts centre. As well, the walkway along Spadina Crescent between Second and Third Avenues was formally named the Joni Mitchell Promenade.

In 2020, Mitchell received the Les Paul Award, becoming the first woman to be so honoured. She was named as MusiCares Person of the Year in 2022.

In 2021, Mitchell was nominated for the Grammy Award for Best Historical Album, for her Archives, Vol. 1: The Early Years (1963–1967) collection. She won the award on April 3, 2022.

On December 4, 2021, Mitchell received the Kennedy Center Honor for a lifetime of achievement in the performing arts at the Medallion Ceremony, held at the Library of Congress in Washington, D.C. The next day, Mitchell attended the show at the Kennedy Center.

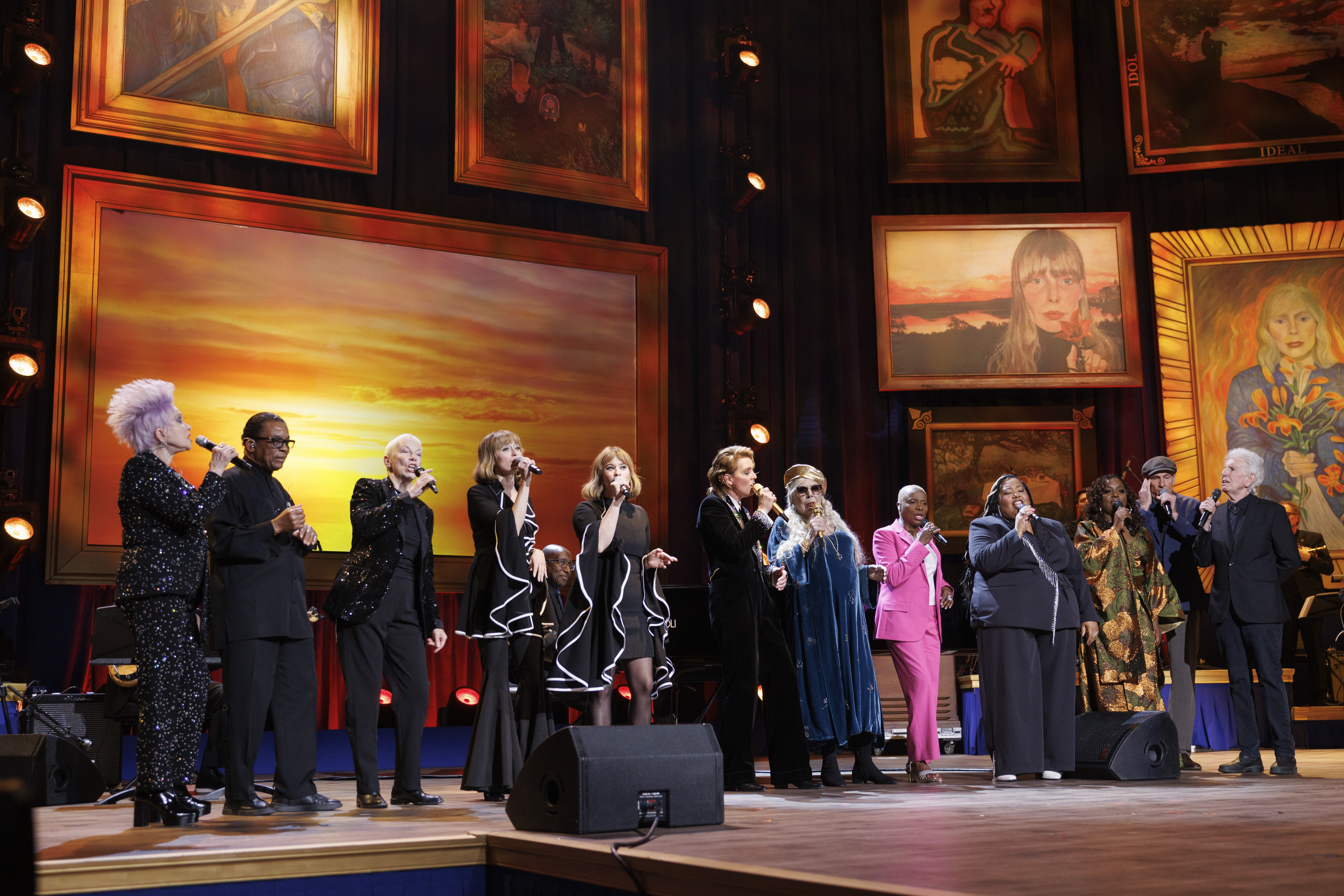
An all-star ensemble performs at the 2023 Gershwin Prize honouring Mitchell.

On January 1, 2023, Rolling Stone magazine ranked Mitchell as number 50 on its list of "The 200 Greatest Singers of All Time".

On January 12, 2023, Mitchell was named by the Library of Congress as that year's Gershwin Prize recipient with a concert delivered on March 2 in Washington, D.C., in honour of the award.

Rolling Stone named Mitchell the 9th greatest guitarist of all time in 2023.

On February 1, 2026, Mitchell won the Grammy Award for Best Historical Album for her retrospective collection Joni Mitchell Archives – Vol. 4: The Asylum Years.

=== ASCAP Pop Awards ===
Year	Nominee / work	Award	Result
2005	"Big Yellow Taxi"	Most Performed Song	Won

=== Grammy Awards ===
Year	Category	Work	Result
1970	Best Folk Performance	Clouds	Won
1975	Album of the Year	Court and Spark	Nominated
1975	Best Pop Vocal Performance, Female	Court and Spark	Nominated
1975	Record of the Year	"Help Me"	Nominated
1975	Best Arrangement Accompanying Vocalist(s)	"Down to You"	Won
1977	Best Pop Vocal Performance, Female	The Hissing of Summer Lawns	Nominated
1989	Best Pop Vocal Performance, Female	Chalk Mark in a Rain Storm	Nominated
1996	Best Pop Album	Turbulent Indigo	Won
1996	Best Album Package	Turbulent Indigo	Won
2001	Best Pop Vocal Performance, Female	"Both Sides, Now"	Nominated
2001	Best Traditional Pop Vocal Album	Both Sides, Now	Won
2002	Lifetime Achievement Award	–	Honored
2008	Album of the Year	River: The Joni Letters	Won*
2008	Best Pop Instrumental Performance	"One Week Last Summer"	Won
2016	Best Album Notes	Love Has Many Faces: A Quartet, a Ballet, Waiting to Be Danced	Won
2022	Best Historical Album	Joni Mitchell Archives – Vol. 1: The Early Years (1963–1967)	Won
2024	Best Folk Album	Joni Mitchell at Newport	Won
2026	Best Historical Album	Joni Mitchell Archives – Vol. 4: The Asylum Years (1976–1980)	Won

*Although officially a Herbie Hancock release, Mitchell also received a Grammy for her vocal contribution to the album.

=== Juno Awards ===
Year	Nominee / work	Award	Result
1980	Herself	Female Vocalist of the Year	Nominated
1981	Herself	Female Vocalist of the Year	Nominated
1981	Herself	Canadian Music Hall of Fame	Won
1982	Herself	Folk Artist of the Year	Nominated
1982	Herself	Female Artist of the Year	Nominated
1983	Herself	Female Artist of the Year	Nominated
1995	Herself	Songwriter of the Year	Nominated
1995	Turbulent Indigo	Best Roots & Traditional Album	Nominated
2000	Taming the Tiger	Best Pop/Adult Album	Nominated
2001	Both Sides, Now	Best Vocal Jazz Album	Won
2008	Herself	Producer of the Year	Won
2026	Herself	Lifetime Achievement Award	Won

=== Pollstar Concert Industry Awards ===
Year	Nominee / work	Award	Result	Ref.
1986	Tour	Comeback Tour of the Year	Nominated	

== Discography ==
Studio albums

- Song to a Seagull (1968)
- Clouds (1969)
- Ladies of the Canyon (1970)
- Blue (1971)
- For the Roses (1972)
- Court and Spark (1974)
- The Hissing of Summer Lawns (1975)
- Hejira (1976)
- Don Juan's Reckless Daughter (1977)
- Mingus (1979)
- Wild Things Run Fast (1982)
- Dog Eat Dog (1985)
- Chalk Mark in a Rain Storm (1988)
- Night Ride Home (1991)
- Turbulent Indigo (1994)
- Taming the Tiger (1998)
- Both Sides Now (2000)
- Travelogue (2002)
- Shine (2007)

== See also ==
- List of Canadian Grammy Award winners and nominees

== General and cited sources ==
- Monk, Katherine (2012). Joni: The Creative Odyssey of Joni Mitchell. Greystone Books. ISBN 978-1-55365-838-2.
- Whitesell, Lloyd (2008). The Music of Joni Mitchell. Oxford Univ. Press. ISBN 978-0-19-530757-3. Archived from the original on February 2, 2024.
