= L.A. Express =

American jazz fusion ensemble

The L.A. Express was an American jazz fusion ensemble. Members of L.A. Express played on several Joni Mitchell albums, namely Court and Spark, The Hissing of Summer Lawns and the live album Miles of Aisles between 1974 and 1975.

The band also had two jazz instrumental albums on their own – L.A. Express (1976), and Shadow Play (1976). The latter featured backing vocals and cover art by Mitchell. Both albums were recorded at James Guercio's Caribou Ranch studio and were the first albums released on the Caribou label.

The L.A. Express formed in 1973 as the backing band for jazz saxophonist Tom Scott.

The original lineup included bassist Max Bennett, drummer John Guerin, guitarist Larry Carlton, and keyboardist Joe Sample (the latter two were also members of the group The Crusaders). They recorded the album Tom Scott and The L.A. Express, as well as a number of tracks on Joni Mitchell's Court and Spark album in 1974 with this lineup, before both Carlton and Sample left the group. Robben Ford replaced Carlton as guitarist and Larry Nash took over as the group's keyboardist.

After attending a Joni Mitchell concert in London in April 1974 and being impressed by the sound of her backing band, George Harrison invited the group to his home at Friar Park, where they recorded the basic tracks for "Hari's on Tour (Express)" and "Simply Shady", which were released in December of that year as the first and second tracks, respectively, on Harrison's Dark Horse album.

The group also performed the score to the 1974 adult animated comedy film The Nine Lives of Fritz the Cat.

With Ford and Nash on board, Tom Scott and the L.A. Express recorded the Tom Cat album in late 1974 (released on Ode Records in early 1975). In Christgau's Record Guide: Rock Albums of the Seventies (1981), Robert Christgau dismissed it as "background music without the foreground. It doesn't swing, it doesn't rock—it hops." After the release of Tom Cat, Scott left the group and began recording solo.

The group recorded their first album without Scott in 1976 – the self-titled L.A. Express, which had as cover art a close-up of a belt buckle embossed with the band's name (simply "L.A. Express"), similar to one reading "Tom Scott & the L.A. Express" which was worn by a model on the cover of their first album with Scott. Later in the same year they recorded Shadow Play, which included several popular jazz tracks played on jazz radio well into the early 1980s.

On the first of these two albums keyboardist Larry Nash was replaced by Victor Feldman, and David Luell played saxophone and woodwinds. Robben Ford left the group prior to the recording of Shadow Play and was replaced by guitarist Peter Maunu.
