= Down to You (song) =

Song by Joni Mitchell

from the album Court and Spark
- Released: 1974
- Recorded: 1973
- Studio: A&M, Hollywood
- Length: 5:38
- Label: Asylum
- Songwriter: Joni Mitchell
- Producer: Joni Mitchell

Official Audio
- "Down to You" on YouTube

"Down to You" is a song written by Joni Mitchell that was first released on her 1974 album Court and Spark. It won the Grammy Award for Best Arrangement Accompanying Vocalist(s).

== Lyrics and music ==
"Down to You" uses a verse-bridge structure. It is in the keys of D major and E major. It begins with Mitchell playing a solo piano introduction. The theme of the song is the need to either change your life or take responsibility for it, since "it all comes down to you." Music professor Lloyd Whitesell describes it as "a wry meditation on the transience of love and moral certainty." The song takes place in the aftermath of a one-night stand. The verses provide philosophical ruminations about the situation, while the bridge provides more specifics. The opening lines of the first verse, "Everything comes and goes/marked by lovers and styles of clothes," set the tone for the song. Sean Nelson describes the lyrics as being "terse but true, general but suggestive, clever but light, and they rhyme," and also claims that with only those two lines Mitchell could have "had a pretty good song on her hands." At the beginning of the song Mitchell seems to be addressing herself, or else a more generalized someone.

The bridge begins with the lines:

You go down to the pick up station
Craving warmth and beauty
You settle for less than fascination
A few drinks later you're not so choosy

These lines may also be addressed to herself, or may be addressed to the absent lover. The lyrics are ambiguous in this respect, and are also ambiguous as to whether the bridge is addressed to a real or fictional person, and even as to the gender of the person the lyrics are addressed to.

By the end of the penultimate verse, a random encounter with a stranger in the light of day leads the singer to realize that "love is gone," and the tryst of the prior night wasn't really love. This realization is underscored by David Crosby and Susan Webb joining Mitchell to sing the line. This recognition then leads to an extended orchestral interlude. While the orchestral instruments alternately take up the musical theme, Mitchell plays the piano using different types of chords, including major key, minor key, diminished and augmented chords. Music journalist Mark Bego describes Mitchell's playing as being like a jazz solo.

According to author Larry David Smith, the final verse ends with "an acceptance of life's uneven qualities, and the resignation of acceptance."

== Reception ==
At the 1975 Grammy Awards, Mitchell and Tom Scott won the Grammy Award for Best Arrangement Accompanying Vocalist(s) for "Down to You".

Tom Scott, while enthusiastically praising Mitchell, has stated that he deserved sole arrangement credit for this cut. Music journalist Mark Bego describes it as a "sheer masterpiece." Pitchfork Media critic Jessica Hopper describes the arrangement as being "stunning in its complexity."

== Personnel ==
- Joni Mitchell – vocals, acoustic guitar, piano; clavinet
- Tom Scott – woodwinds, reeds
- Joe Sample – electric piano
- Larry Carlton – electric guitar
- Max Bennett – bass guitar
- John Guerin – drums, percussion

Additional personnel

- David Crosby – backing vocals
- Susan Webb – backing vocals

Technical personnel

- Joni Mitchell – record producer
- Henry Lewy and Ellis Sorkin – engineers
