= Free Man in Paris =

Single by Joni Mitchell

Single by Joni Mitchell

from the album Court and Spark
- B-side: "People's Parties"
- Released: July 1974
- Recorded: 1973
- Studio: A&M (Hollywood, California)
- Genre: Folk jazz, jazz fusion
- Length: 3:02
- Label: Asylum
- Songwriter: Joni Mitchell
- Producer: Joni Mitchell

Joni Mitchell singles chronology
"Help Me" (1974)	"Free Man in Paris" (1974)	"Big Yellow Taxi (live)" (1974)

Official Audio
- "Free Man in Paris" on YouTube

"Free Man in Paris" is a song written by Canadian singer-songwriter Joni Mitchell. It appeared on her 1974 album Court and Spark, as well as her 1980 live album Shadows and Light. It is ranked No. 470 on Rolling Stone's list of the 500 Greatest Songs of All Time.

== Background ==
The song is about music agent/promoter David Geffen, a close friend of Mitchell in the early 1970s, and describes Geffen during a trip the two made to Paris with Robbie Robertson and Dominique Robertson. While Geffen is never mentioned by name, Mitchell describes how he works hard creating hits and launching careers but can find some peace while vacationing in Paris. Mitchell sings "I was a free man in Paris. I felt unfettered and alive. Nobody calling me up for favors. No one's future to decide."

== Reception ==
Billboard described it as having a "good mix of acoustic and electric instrumentals" with Mitchell's "distinctive vocals." Cash Box said that "lyrically, this is a total gem and the musical arrangement is letter perfect" and that "the melody is infectious." Record World said that with this song Mitchell "needs no aid other than a healthy ear from American hit-pickers to ensure her yet another triumph."

Bob Dylan selected it for inclusion on the Starbucks compilation album Joni Mitchell: Selected Songs in 2005. For the album's liner notes, Dylan wrote: "I always liked this song because I'd been to Paris and understood what being a free man there was all about. Paris was, after all, where freedom and the guillotine lived side by side. I'm not so sure that the meaning I heard in the song was what Joni intended but I couldn't stop listening to it".

== Chart performance ==
"Free Man in Paris" went to number 22 on the Billboard Hot 100 and to number two on the Easy Listening chart. The song peaked at number 16 in Canada.

== Notable versions and covers ==
- In the 1970s, an instrumental version of the song was the theme music used for CBC Television's The Saturday Evening News, which aired at 6 p.m. until 1982 when it was replaced with Saturday Report.
- Aimee Mann
- Neil Diamond
- Sufjan Stevens (on the album A Tribute to Joni Mitchell)
- Adrienne Young
- Phish
- Alanis Morissette
- JoJo who changed the title to "White Girl in Paris".
- In April 2000 the song was performed by Elton John at a celebration of Mitchell, at the Hammerstein Ballroom in New York, staged by the TNT network.

== Personnel ==
- Joni Mitchell – vocals, guitars
- Tom Scott – woodwinds
- José Feliciano, Larry Carlton – electric guitars
- Wilton Felder – bass
- John Guerin – drums
- David Crosby and Graham Nash – backing vocals

== Charts ==
Chart performance for "Free Man in Paris"
Chart (1974)	Peak position
Canada Top Singles (RPM)	16
Canada Adult Contemporary (RPM)	3
US Billboard Hot 100	22
US Adult Contemporary (Billboard)	2
US Cash Box Top 100	23
