= Coyote (song) =

Single by Joni Mitchell

from the album Hejira
- B-side: "Blue Motel Room"
- Released: February 1977
- Studio: A&M (Hollywood, California)
- Length: 5:01; 3:40 (7")
- Label: Asylum
- Songwriter: Joni Mitchell

Joni Mitchell singles chronology
"In France They Kiss on Main Street" (1976)	"Coyote" (1977)	"Off Night Backstreet" (1978)

Official audio
- Coyote on YouTube

"Coyote" is a song by Canadian singer-songwriter Joni Mitchell from her eighth album Hejira (1976). It was released as the album's lead single on the Asylum label.

== Background ==
"Coyote" was inspired by Sam Shepard, with whom Mitchell was briefly linked during Bob Dylan's 1975–76 Rolling Thunder Revue tour. Martin Scorsese's 2019 documentary film about the tour includes footage of Mitchell performing the song at Gordon Lightfoot's house, with Dylan and Roger McGuinn accompanying her on acoustic guitar. Prior to the performance McGuinn states that Mitchell "wrote this song about this tour and on this tour and for this tour." In biographer David Yaffe's 2017 book Reckless Daughter, Mitchell describes how she "had a flirtation" with Shepard.

In her 2019 book Joni Mitchell: New Critical Readings, Ruth Charnock described the song as "either the most flirtatious song about fucking or the most graphic song about flirting ever written". In Chris O'Dell's 2009 autobiography Miss O'Dell she details an affair she had with a then-married Shepard and states that Shepard then cheated on her with Mitchell.

The song describes Coyote as being "too far from the Bay of Fundy". In the summers of 1972 and 1973, Shepard resided in a waterside cottage in West Advocate, Nova Scotia, located on a strip of land which extends into the Bay of Fundy. The narrator also mentions looking an actual coyote in the face while "on the road to Baljennie near my old home town", a reference to the former hamlet of Baljennie, Saskatchewan. Mitchell was raised in Maidstone, North Battleford, and Saskatoon in Saskatchewan.

== Reception and legacy ==
Rolling Stone included the song on an unranked list of Mitchell's essential 50 songs in 2021. In an article accompanying the list, critic Douglas Wolk noted that it possesses "long, tricky, rattling verses that chronicle a romance with a womanizing man whose life is very different from the narrator's" and that it had been a "highlight" of her live repertoire for several years before she recorded it for Hejira.

Bob Dylan played Mitchell's original studio-album version on the "Noah's Ark Part 2" episode of the third season of his Theme Time Radio Hour show in 2009, introducing it as a song by a "strong-willed woman, and I mean that in the best possible way".

== Later versions ==
A live version of "Coyote" was performed by Mitchell with the Band for the 1978 concert movie The Last Waltz, and is included on the film's soundtrack album. Another live version appears on Mitchell's 1980 live album Shadows and Light. Like the original, it features Jaco Pastorius on bass, but with Pat Metheny as a second guitarist and Don Alias replacing Bobbye Hall on percussion.

Mitchell would reuse much of the same instrumentation on the title track from her next album, Don Juan's Reckless Daughter. Mitchell would frequently play the two songs together as a medley.

"Coyote" appeared on the 1992 Mitchell tribute album Back to the Garden, with Canadian band Spirit of the West covering the song.

== Personnel ==
- Joni Mitchell – acoustic and electric guitars, vocals
- Jaco Pastorius – bass guitar
- Bobbye Hall – percussion

== Charts ==
Chart performance for "Coyote"
Chart (1977)	Peak position
Canada Top Singles (RPM)	79
