= Blue (Joni Mitchell song) =

Song by Joni Mitchell

from the album Blue
- Released: 1971
- Genre: Folk rock
- Length: 3:00
- Label: Reprise
- Songwriter: Joni Mitchell
- Producer: Joni Mitchell

"Blue" is the title song from Joni Mitchell's 1971 album of the same name. The song is generally thought to be about James Taylor, with the final line "There is your song from me" being directed to Taylor. As Sheila Weller states in the biography Girls Like Us, "Its references to a drug addict's 'needles' and...proffering a seashell to her lover...make it fairly clear that 'Blue' is about James".

The lines "acid, booze and ass, needles guns and grass, lots of laughs" from "Blue" were sampled for a bonus track titled "Song 4 U" on Mac Dre's The Genie of the Lamp album. The song is sampled on the track "My World Is..", from Blu and Exile's 2007 album Below the Heavens. The track is also sampled on "Catch My Drift", a 1989 song by the British group A.R. Kane.

"Blue" also appears in an important scene in the critically acclaimed 2019 film The Last Black Man in San Francisco. The director, Joe Talbot, was unable to secure permissions for Mac Dre's "Song 4 U" but was able to get needle-drop rights to Mitchell's original recording.

== Cover versions ==
- Angie Hart recorded an a cappella version which was released in 1993 as a B-side on Frente!'s "No Time" single.
- Sarah McLachlan's version appeared on her 1996 compilation Rarities, B-Sides and Other Stuff.
- Cat Power released a version on her 2008 studio album Jukebox.
- Rufus Wainwright's version appeared on the 2019 live tribute album Joni 75: A Birthday Celebration
