= Help Me (Joni Mitchell song) =

Single by Joni Mitchell

from the album Court and Spark
- B-side: "Just Like This Train"
- Released: March 1974
- Recorded: 1973
- Studio: A&M (Hollywood, California)
- Genre: Jazz pop
- Length: 3:22
- Label: Asylum
- Songwriter: Joni Mitchell
- Producer: Joni Mitchell

Joni Mitchell singles chronology
"Raised on Robbery" (1973)	"Help Me" (1974)	"Free Man in Paris" (1974)

Official Audio
- "Help Me" on YouTube

"Help Me" is a love song written, produced, and performed by Canadian-American singer Joni Mitchell and released on her 1974 album Court and Spark. The song was recorded with jazz band Tom Scott's L.A. Express as the backing band.

"Help Me" was Mitchell's biggest hit single, her only Top 10 hit. It peaked at No. 7 in June 1974 on the Billboard Hot 100, and it hit #1 on the easy listening chart. The song would later be referenced in "The Ballad of Dorothy Parker" by Prince, who was a huge fan of Mitchell's work.

== Critical reception ==
Billboard commented on Mitchell's voice punctuating words in similar way to the "sharp breaks" played by the drummer. Cashbox believed that the song would appeal to existing fans of her work and also attract a new audience "due to the strong vocal performance and fine musical backing." Rolling Stone magazine ranked the song No. 464 on their 500 Greatest Songs of All Time list.

== Personnel ==
- Joni Mitchell – vocals, acoustic guitar, piano; producer
- Tom Scott – woodwinds, reeds
- Joe Sample – electric piano
- Larry Carlton – electric guitar
- Max Bennett – bass guitar
- John Guerin – drums, percussion
- Henry Lewy and Ellis Sorkin – engineers

== Charts ==
=== Weekly charts ===
Chart (1974)	Peak position
Canada RPM Top Singles	6
Canada RPM Adult Contemporary	4
U.S. Billboard Hot 100	7
U.S. Billboard Adult Contemporary	1
U.S. Cash Box Top 100	8
Quebec (ADISQ)	13

=== Year-end charts ===
Chart (1974)	Rank
Canada RPM Top Singles	82
U.S. Billboard Hot 100	53
U.S. Cash Box	50

== See also ==
- List of number-one adult contemporary singles of 1974 (U.S.)
