= Court and Spark =

Studio album by Joni Mitchell
- Released: January 17, 1974
- Recorded: 1973
- Studios: A&M, Hollywood
- Genres: Soft rock; pop; jazz pop; jazz-rock
- Length: 36:58
- Label: Asylum
- Producer: Joni Mitchell

Joni Mitchell chronology
For the Roses (1972)	Court and Spark (1974)	Miles of Aisles (1974)

Singles from Court and Spark
- 1. "Raised on Robbery" Released: December 1973; 2. "Help Me" Released: March 1974; 3. "Free Man in Paris" Released: July 1974

Court and Spark is the sixth studio album by Canadian singer-songwriter Joni Mitchell. Released by Asylum Records in January 1974, it infuses the folk rock style of her previous albums with jazz elements.

It was an immediate commercial and critical success, and remains her most successful album. It reached No. 2 in the United States and No. 1 in Canada and eventually received a double platinum certification by the RIAA, the highest of Mitchell's career. It also reached the Top 20 in the UK and was voted the best album of the year for 1974 in The Village Voice Pazz & Jop Critics Poll. In 2020, it was ranked at number 110 in Rolling Stone's 500 Greatest Albums of All Time.

In 2004, Court and Spark was inducted into the Grammy Hall of Fame.

== Background ==
Mitchell did not release a new album in 1973, the first year she had not done so in her professional career. Her previous offering, For the Roses, was released in November 1972 to critical and commercial success, and Mitchell decided to spend the whole of the next year writing and recording a new album that revealed her growing interest in new sounds—particularly jazz. During 1973 her stage appearances were fewer than in previous years. She performed in April in a benefit concert at the Sir George Williams University Auditorium and then appeared live again in August, twice at The Corral Club, accompanied by Neil Young.

Mitchell spent most of 1973 in the recording studio creating Court and Spark. Mitchell and engineer Henry Lewy called in a number of top L.A. musicians to perform on the album including members of the Crusaders, Tom Scott's L.A. Express, cameos from Robbie Robertson, David Crosby and Graham Nash and even a twist of comedy from Cheech & Chong.

== Release and reception ==
On December 1, 1973, Asylum Records released a single, her first in over a year, "Raised on Robbery". The single reached No. 65 on the Billboard Singles Chart in February 1974. In January 1974, Court and Spark was released, and met with widespread critical acclaim and commercial success. Its success was reaffirmed when the follow-up single, "Help Me", was released in March. It received heavy radio airplay and became Mitchell's first and only top 10 Billboard single, peaking at No. 7 on the Hot 100 in the first week of June, and reaching No. 1 on the Adult Contemporary chart.

Professional ratings
Review scores
Source	Rating
AllMusic	5/5 stars
Christgau's Record Guide	A
Encyclopedia of Popular Music	5/5 stars
MusicHound	5/5
Pitchfork Media	10/10
Q	5/5 stars
The Rolling Stone Album Guide	5/5 stars
Slant Magazine	5/5 stars
Martin C. Strong	9/10
Uncut	9/10

Court and Spark became a big seller that year, peaking at No.2 on the Billboard album chart and staying there for four weeks. The album topped the US Cashbox and Record World charts for one week each.

In a July 1979 interview with Cameron Crowe for Rolling Stone, Mitchell recounted playing the newly completed Court and Spark to Bob Dylan, during which he fell asleep. She later suggested that Dylan was probably trying to be "cute" in front of label boss David Geffen, who was also present.

Singer Stevie Nicks recalled taking LSD to the album, which she said was: "a pretty dynamic experience."

In 2000 it was voted number 116 in Colin Larkin's All Time Top 1000 Albums.

== Honors ==
- RIAA certifications: gold February 27, 1974; platinum and double platinum December 12, 1997.
- In 1974, Court and Spark was voted the 'Best Album of the Year' in The Village Voice Pazz & Jop critics poll.
- It was voted number 116 in Colin Larkin's All Time Top 1000 Albums 3rd Edition (2000).
- In 2003, the album was ranked number 111 on Rolling Stone magazine's list of the 500 Greatest Albums of All Time, 114 in a 2012 revised list, and 110 in a 2020 revised list.

Grammy Awards

Year	Nominee / work	Award	Result
1975	Court and Spark	Album of the Year	Nominated
1975	"Help Me"	Record of the Year	Nominated
1975	"Help Me"	Best Female Pop Vocal Performance	Nominated
1975	"Down to You" (arranger: Joni Mitchell and Tom Scott)	Best Arrangement Accompanying Vocalist(s)	Won

== Track listing ==
All tracks are written by Joni Mitchell, except where noted.

Side one

1. "Court and Spark" – 2:46
2. "Help Me" – 3:22
3. "Free Man in Paris" – 3:02
4. "People's Parties" – 2:15
5. "The Same Situation" – 2:57

Side two

1. "Car on a Hill" – 3:02
2. "Down to You" – 5:38
3. "Just Like This Train" – 4:24
4. "Raised on Robbery" – 3:06
5. "Trouble Child" – 4:00
6. "Twisted" (Annie Ross, Wardell Gray) – 2:21

== Personnel ==
- Joni Mitchell – vocals, acoustic guitar, piano; clavinet on "Down to You"
- Tom Scott – woodwinds, reeds
- Joe Sample – electric piano; clavinet on "Raised on Robbery"
- Larry Carlton – electric guitar on all tracks except "Car on a Hill", "Raised on Robbery" and "Trouble Child"
- Max Bennett – bass guitar on all tracks except "Free Man in Paris", "People's Parties" and "Trouble Child"
- John Guerin – drums, percussion
- Chuck Findley – trumpet on "Trouble Child" and "Twisted"
- José Feliciano – electric guitar on "Free Man in Paris"
- Wayne Perkins – electric guitar on "Car on a Hill"
- Robbie Robertson – electric guitar on "Raised on Robbery"
- Dennis Budimir – electric guitar on "Trouble Child"
- Wilton Felder – bass guitar on "Free Man in Paris" and "People's Parties"
- Jim Hughart – bass guitar on "Trouble Child"
- Milt Holland – chimes on "Court and Spark"
- David Crosby – backing vocals on "Free Man in Paris" and "Down to You"
- Graham Nash – backing vocals on "Free Man in Paris"
- Susan Webb – backing vocals on "Down to You"
- Cheech Marin, Tommy Chong – background voices on "Twisted"

Technical personnel

- Joni Mitchell – record producer
- Henry Lewy and Ellis Sorkin – engineers
- Anthony Hudson – art direction, design
- Joni Mitchell – cover painting
- Norman Seeff – photography

== Charts and certifications ==
=== Weekly charts ===
Weekly chart performance for Court and Spark
Chart (1974)	Position
Australian Albums (Kent Music Report)	34
Canada Top Albums/CDs (RPM)	1
Norwegian Albums (VG-lista)	18
UK Albums (Official Charts)	14
US Billboard 200	2
US Cash Box Top 100 Albums	1
US Record World Album Chart	1

=== Year-end charts ===
Year-end chart performance for Court and Spark
Chart (1974)	Position
Canadian Albums Chart	23
US Billboard Pop Albums	13

=== Certifications ===
Certifications for Court and Spark
Region	Certification	Certified units/sales
United States (RIAA)	2× Platinum	2,000,000^{^}
^{^} Shipments figures based on certification alone.
