= Acts 27 =

- ← chapter 26 chapter 28 →
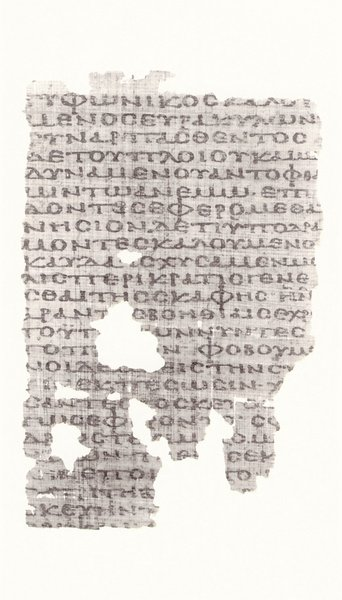
- Acts 27:14-21 in Papyrus 74 (7th century)
- Book: Acts of the Apostles
- Category: Church history
- Christian Bible part: New Testament
- Order in the Christian part: 5

Acts 27 is the twenty-seventh chapter of the Acts of the Apostles in the New Testament of the Christian Bible. It records the journey of Paul from Caesarea heading to Rome, but stranded for a time in Malta. Early Christian tradition uniformly affirmed that Luke composed this book as well as the Gospel of Luke. Critical opinion on the traditional attribution to Luke the Evangelist was evenly divided at the end of the 20th century.

== Text ==
The original text was written in Koine Greek. This chapter is divided into 44 verses.

=== Textual witnesses ===
Some early manuscripts containing the text of this chapter are:

- Codex Vaticanus (AD 325–350)
- Codex Sinaiticus (330–360)
- Codex Bezae (~400)
- Codex Alexandrinus (400–440)
- Codex Ephraemi Rescriptus (~450; extant verses 17–44)

=== Narrator ===
Verses 1-8, 15-20, 27-29 and 37 are examples of the passages within Acts which speak of "we", including the narrator.

== Locations ==
Places mentioned in (blue) and related to (black) this chapter.
Places mentioned in (blue) and related to (black) this chapter.

This chapter mentions or alludes to the following places (in order of appearance):

- Italy
- Adramyttium
- Asia (Roman province)
- Thessalonica, Macedonia
- Sidon
- Cyprus
- Cilicia
- Pamphylia
- Myra, Lycia
- Alexandria
- Cnidus
- Salmone, Crete
- Fair Havens
- Lasea
- Phoenix
- Clauda or Cauda island
- Syrtis Sands
- Adriatic Sea
- Malta

== Along the coasts of Asia Minor (27:1–12) ==
Paul was accompanied by at least two companions following him from Macedonia, including Aristarchus (verse 2) and the unnamed "we"-narrator (verse 1). The narrator's customary nautical detail is shown by noting that the first ship they boarded for the coastal voyage originally came from Adramyttium (at the Aegean north coast towards the Troas, verse 2), and that the second came from Alexandria (verse 6), which could be one of grain ships (cf. verse 38) supplying Rome with grain from its 'bread-basket' in Egypt.

=== Verse 1 ===
And when it was determined that we should sail into Italy, they delivered Paul and certain other prisoners unto one named Julius, a centurion of Augustus' band.

- "Augustus' band": also called "Augustan Regiment" (NKJV) or "Augustan cohort" of auxiliaries in Syria during most of the first century is attested in ancient inscriptions.

Heinrich Meyer notes that nothing further is known of the centurion Julius. Tacitus mentions a Julius Priscus as centurion of the Praetorians (Histories. ii. 92, iv. 11); but he also comments that Julius was an "extremely common" name.

=== Verse 2 ===
And entering into a ship of Adramyttium, we launched, meaning to sail by the coasts of Asia; one Aristarchus, a Macedonian of Thessalonica, being with us.

- "Aristarchus": One of Paul's travel companions, a Macedonian from Thessalonica, who is known from some references in the Acts of the Apostles (19:29; 20:4; 27:2) and Colossians 4:10.

== Windstorm near Crete (27:13–26) ==
This passage has many nautical technicalities which can be attested in ancient navigation. Fair Havens, on the southern coast of Crete (verse 8), is the small bays with rocky beach that would be hard for a large ship to shelter from winter storms, so it is reasonable to find a better harbor (verse 12), but that decision was too late, and the ship is caught by a "typhoon wind" (verse 14), called "Euraquilo" (NRSV 'north-Easter', verse 14; this name appears on a Roman wind-rose found in North Africa). It is very difficult for Roman ships, usually with a single large sail, to turn into the wind (verse 15), so the ship was in real danger of being stranded on the sandbanks of the Syrtis, off the northern coast of Africa (verse 17). During the distress, Paul provided courage and persuasion for fellow-passengers to believe the divine promise of survival he received in a dream (verses 21–26), even though they had ignored his advice about sailing that he gave in verse 10. The story is a kind of reversal of the one in the Book of Jonah: Jonah's disobedience to God brought his ship into danger (Jonah 1:12), whereas Paul's obedience brought safety for his (verse 24).

== Up and down in Adria (27:27-38) ==
"Adria" (also called "Ionian Sea" in ancient writings) refers to the open sea between Crete, Sicily, Italy, and North Africa, not the same as the modern Adriatic Sea. First-century historian Josephus recalled his shipwreck in the same area with 600 passengers (Josephus, Vita, 15). The 'pattern of soundings' (verse 28) and landmarks (verses 39, 41) fits the traditional identification of location as St Paul's Bay on the island of Malta, though there are other suggestions (see "Shipwreck location on Malta" below). After fourteen days without eating, Paul "took bread and gave thanks to God in the presence of all, and he broke it and began to eat" (verse 35) and 276 passengers followed his lead. The verse recalls Jesus Christ God feeding the multitude and the words said by priest during the Eucharistic Consecration.

== All safe to land (27:39-44) ==
The experienced sailors took the risky strategy of casting off the anchors and running the ship ashore with the help of improved visibility in the morning (verses 39–40), but the plan was hindered by some unexpected underwater barrier (verse 41), so the ship started to break up at some distance from the beach. In the phrase "run the ship aground", the word "ship" uses the Homeric and classical Greek word nans, instead of ploion (boat) and skaphos (dinghy) in other passages, and the verb epokello ("run aground") is also Homeric (cf. Homer, Odyssey), indicating the Greek education background of the author.

== Calculation of position ==
According to Jefferson White, the meteorological and nautical evidence demonstrates that these events must have occurred just as Luke records them. The most important piece of evidence is the exact compass bearing of the gale. This bearing can be established by means of three separate calculations.

- First, Luke states that Euraquilo struck shortly after they left Fair Havens. In other words, the ship must have been less than halfway to their intended destination at Phoenix. They must have been somewhere between Cape Matala and a point seventeen miles W.N.W. of the Cape when the gale struck.
- Second, there is the relation of the island of Clauda (or Cauda) to this start point. Cape Matala is on a bearing of east 7 degrees north from the eastern edge of Clauda, while the halfway point to Phoenix is east 40 degrees north. For the ship to get behind Clauda, Euraquilo must have been blowing from a point somewhere between these two bearings. The point midway between these two figures is east 25 degrees north (or E.N.E. 1/4 N.). This cannot be more than a point and a half off the actual direction of the wind.
- Third, Luke states that when they got behind Clauda, the sailors were afraid that they would be blown onto the Syrtis sandbanks of north Africa. However, for them to have been blown onto those banks from Clauda, Euraquilo would have had to have been blowing from a point somewhere between east 18 degrees north and east 37 degrees north. The point midway between these figures is east 27 degrees north. This figure is only 1/4 point off the mean figure of the previous calculation.

These three calculations establish that the direction from which the wind was blowing could not have been more than a point off the designation E.N.E. 1/2 N. As the ship drifted west from Clauda, it would have been pointed due north, because it could not have been pointed directly into the wind without capsizing. In other words, it had to have been pointed north, just off the direction from which the wind was coming. Using this information, with some precision both the direction and rate of the ship's drift to the west can be calculated.

Ancient records reveal that Egyptian grain ships were the largest vessels of the time, being about the size of an early nineteenth century sailing vessel. This size is implicitly confirmed by Luke's statement that there were 276 people on board. Since their ship was pointed due north, while the wind was from the northeast, the azimuth, or direction, of the ship's lateral – or sideways – drift from Clauda would have been approximately west eight degrees north. The island of Malta is not directly west of Clauda. Instead, Malta's bearing from Clauda is exactly west eight degrees north.

This brings to yet another piece of evidence. Luke states that it took them fourteen days to drift to Malta. The distance from Clauda to the easternmost point of Malta is 476.6 miles. To calculate the westward rate of drift of their ship, it is necessary to know two things: the size of the ship and the force of the gale. As the approximate size of the ship is known, it is possible to establish the mean intensity of the gale. An average rate of drift for Paul's vessel can then be calculated. This calculation reveals an average westward drift of one and one half miles per hour. Thus it would take Paul's ship about thirteen days to drift to Malta. Luke records that it took them fourteen days. This nautical and meteorological evidence provides confirmation of the historical accuracy of Luke's narrative.

== Shipwreck location on Malta ==
Location of Saint Paul's Bay (Maltese: San Pawl il-Baħar, Italian: Baia di San Paolo), a town in the Northern Region, Malta.

Bob Cornuke and Graham Hutt claim that the location of the shipwreck was at St. Thomas Bay on the southeast of Malta on a sandbar called Muxnar Reef. However the traditional location is called St. Paul's Bay. Four Roman era anchors from this location are in the Malta Maritime Museum in Birgu. The nearby city, Valletta, hosts a church named 'Collegiate Parish Church of St Paul's Shipwreck'. Yet another theory is that the shipwreck was off Qawra Point and outside Salina Bay. A number of anchor stocks have been found in the area.

== Applications ==
Matthew Henry draws out several points from this chapter to apply to lives of Christians. From verses 1–11 he draws an analogy with those that do not make any headway in life, they fail to take advantage of favourable conditions, even if they resist being driven backwards. Many complain of the great effort just to stay in one place. But then fail to take advantage of good advice to advance in life. Also not all fair havens are safe havens. On verses 12-20 it states that one should not assume the purpose is achieved when starting out. Blessing of the world can turn out to be an unwanted burden, and may have to be discarded, just as things were thrown off the ship in the storm. It is better to make a shipwreck of one's goods than of one's life. But some do the reverse. In the same way that the efforts of the sailors proved useless to saving the ship, and safety only resulted when they gave up, sinners have to give up on saving themselves and rely on the mercy of Jesus. On verses 21–29 Matthew Henry makes the point that those that are interest in God's promises should be ever cheerful, because God is faithful. Hope is an anchor for the soul. On verses 30–38 Matthew Henry's point is that people should take proper safety precautions and not tempt God by failing to take them, and only trusting in him. It is selfish to only look after our own safety at the expense of others. (Commenting on the sailors trying to get away in the lifeboat by themselves). Salvation is via God's plan, which is repentance, faith, prayer and obedience, and not some other shortcut. On verses 39–44 he comments that a heart stuck to the world will be lost.

== See also ==
- Aristarchus
- Euroclydon
- Paul the Apostle
- Other related Bible parts: Acts 26, Acts 28

== Sources ==
- Alexander, Loveday (2007). "62. Acts". In Barton, John; Muddiman, John (eds.). The Oxford Bible Commentary (first (paperback) ed.). Oxford University Press. pp. 1028–1061. ISBN 978-0199277186.
- Coogan, Michael David (2007). Coogan, Michael David; Brettler, Marc Zvi; Newsom, Carol Ann; Perkins, Pheme (eds.). The New Oxford Annotated Bible with the Apocryphal/Deuterocanonical Books: New Revised Standard Version, Issue 48 (Augmented 3rd ed.). Oxford University Press. ISBN 9780195288810.
