= Kali Limenes =

Kali Limenes may refer to:

- Kaloi Limenes, a port village in Crete
- SS Kali Limenes, a coastal tanker built in 1944
- MV Kali Limenes II, a coastal tanker built in 1942
