= Acts 28 =

- ← chapter 27 Romans 1 →
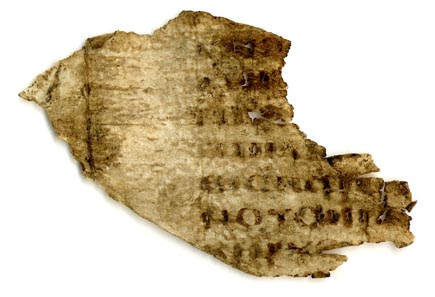
- Acts 28:30-31 in Uncial 0166 (5th century).
- Book: Acts of the Apostles
- Category: Church history
- Christian Bible part: New Testament
- Order in the Christian part: 5

Acts 28 is the twenty-eighth and final chapter of the Acts of the Apostles in the New Testament of the Bible. It records the journey of Paul from Malta to Italy until he is at last settled in Rome. Early Christian tradition uniformly affirmed that Luke composed this book as well as the Gospel of Luke. Critical opinion on the traditional attribution to Luke the Evangelist was evenly divided at the end of the 20th century.

== Text ==
The original text was written in Koine Greek. This chapter is divided into 31 verses.

=== Textual witnesses ===
Some early manuscripts containing the text of this chapter are:

- Codex Vaticanus (AD 325–350)
- Codex Sinaiticus (330–360)
- Codex Bezae (~400)
- Codex Alexandrinus (400–440)
- Codex Ephraemi Rescriptus (~450; extant verses 1–4)
- Codex Laudianus (~550; extant verses 27–31)

=== Old Testament references ===
- Acts 28:27: Isaiah 6:9,10

=== New Testament references ===
- Acts 28:3–5: Luke 10:19
- Acts 28:8: Luke 4:38

== Location ==
Places mentioned in (blue) and related to (black) this chapter.

This chapter mentions or alludes to the following places (in order of appearance):

- Malta
- Alexandria
- Syracuse
- Rhegium
- Puteoli
- Rome
- Appii Forum (Forum Appii)
- Three Inns (Tres Tabernae)

== Miracle on Malta (verses 1–10) ==
=== Verse 1 ===
Now when they had escaped, they then found out that the island was called Malta.

The text refers to Μελίτη (melitē), which is generally acknowledged to mean the island of Malta. It has also been argued that the Dalmatian island of Meleda in the Adriatic Sea, known as Melita Illyrica, was the location. This reading was first put forward in the tenth century by Constantine the Porphyrogenite, and was advocated later by a Dalmatian monk, Padre Georgi, who was a native of Meleda. William Robertson Nicoll argues that "there is no need... to refute [this] view", dismissing Georgi's argument because he was "no doubt jealous for the honour of his birthplace and his monastery".

=== Verse 2 ===
And the natives [barbaroi] showed us unusual kindness; for they kindled a fire and made us all welcome, because of the rain that was falling and because of the cold.

The native inhabitants of the island are called barbaroi in Greek, the standard term for non-Greek speakers. They originally came from Carthage and their native language was Punic. The castaways were brought to a local landowner with the common Roman praenomen, Publius (verse 7), whose Maltese title as 'first man' is attested from ancient inscriptions found in the island. The healing of Publius's sick father (verse 8) recalls Jesus' healing of Peter's mother-in-law, and as in the gospels, prompts other islanders to come for healing (verse 9), indicating that 'God whom Paul serves (Acts 27:23) is still with him' and that 'the whole shipwreck incident has served to load him with honor' (verse 10).

=== Verse 4 ===
So when the natives saw the creature hanging from his hand, they said to one another, "No doubt this man is a murderer, whom, though he has escaped the sea, yet justice does not allow to live."

A viper had attached itself to Paul's hand (verse 3). The word translated as "justice" in the Greek is "η δικη" (hē dikē), i.e. Dike or Dice, the goddess or personification of justice.

=== Verse 6 ===
But they were expecting that he was going to swell up or suddenly drop dead. So after they had waited a long time and had seen nothing unusual happen to him, they changed their minds and said he was a god (theón)."

From the Biblos Interlinear Bible:

| hoi | de | prosedokōn | auton | mellein | pimprasthai | ē | katapiptein | aphnō | nekron |
| οἱ | δὲ | προσεδόκων | αὐτὸν | μέλλειν | πίμπρασθαι | ἢ | καταπίπτειν | ἄφνω | νεκρόν |
| - | but | they were expecting | him | to be going | to become inflamed | or | to fall down | suddenly | dead |

| epi | poly | de | autōn | prosdokōntōn | kai | theōrountōn | mēden | atopon | eis | auton | ginomenon |
| ἐπὶ | πολὺ | δὲ | αὐτῶν | προσδοκώντων | καὶ | θεωρούντων | μηδὲν | ἄτοπον | εἰς | αὐτὸν | γινόμενον |
| after a while | great | however | they | expecting | and | seeing | nothing | amiss | to | him | happening |

| metabalomenoi | elegon | auton | einai | theon |
| μεταβαλόμενοι | ἔλεγον | αὐτὸν | εἶναι | θεόν |
| having changed their opinion | said | he | was | a god |

For comparison, see the debate on John 1:1 regarding the translation "the Word was a god".

The islanders regarded "Paul's imperviousness to snakebite" as a sign of his divine status. This was a common attitude among both Greek-speaking people and 'barbarians'. Chariton of Aphrodisias wrote in his historical novel, Callirhoe (mid first century AD, roughly contemporary with Acts), about a pirate who was saved from shipwreck, who then claimed divine intervention. In this case the pirate was saved so that he could receive a just punishment for his crimes.

=== Verse 8 ===
It happened that the father of Publius lay sick with fever and dysentery. And Paul visited him and prayed, and putting his hands on him, healed him.

Regarding "fever and dysentery", the Pulpit Commentary noted about this verse that "the terms here used are all professional ones". The word Greek: πυρετοῖς, pyretois, "fevers" in the plural, is frequently found in the ancient medical writings of Hippocrates, Aretaeus, and Galen, but elsewhere by other writers in the New Testament always in the singular πυρετός. The term Greek: δυσεντερίῳ, dysenteriō, only found here in the New Testament, is the regular technical word for "dysentery", and used frequently in medical writings coupled with fevers (Greek: πυρετοί or πυρετός), to indicate different stages of the same illness.

The Ethiopic version of Acts adds after "Paul went in to him and prayed", "and he entreated him to put his hand upon him" meaning either that Publius asked this favor on behalf of his father, or the Publius' father himself asked this.

== Journey from Malta to Rome (verses 11–16) ==
An Alexandrian ship wintered in the island gives weight to the identification of 'Melita' with Malta, on the usual line of sea travel from Alexandria to Italy, while the other suggestion, Meleda was far out of the way. The ship stopped in the ports along the east coast of Sicily and the 'toe' of Italy (verses 12–13), featured prominently in ancient Greek writings of voyages to the area, but thereafter the account prefers the Italian names, such as "Puteoli" instead of the Greek Dicaearchia. In Rome there were already 'brothers' (verse 15; NRSV: 'believers') who came out to provide Paul a ceremonial escort along the Appian Way leading into the city. Verse 16 reminds that Paul was still a prisoner with limited liberty.

=== Verse 11 ===
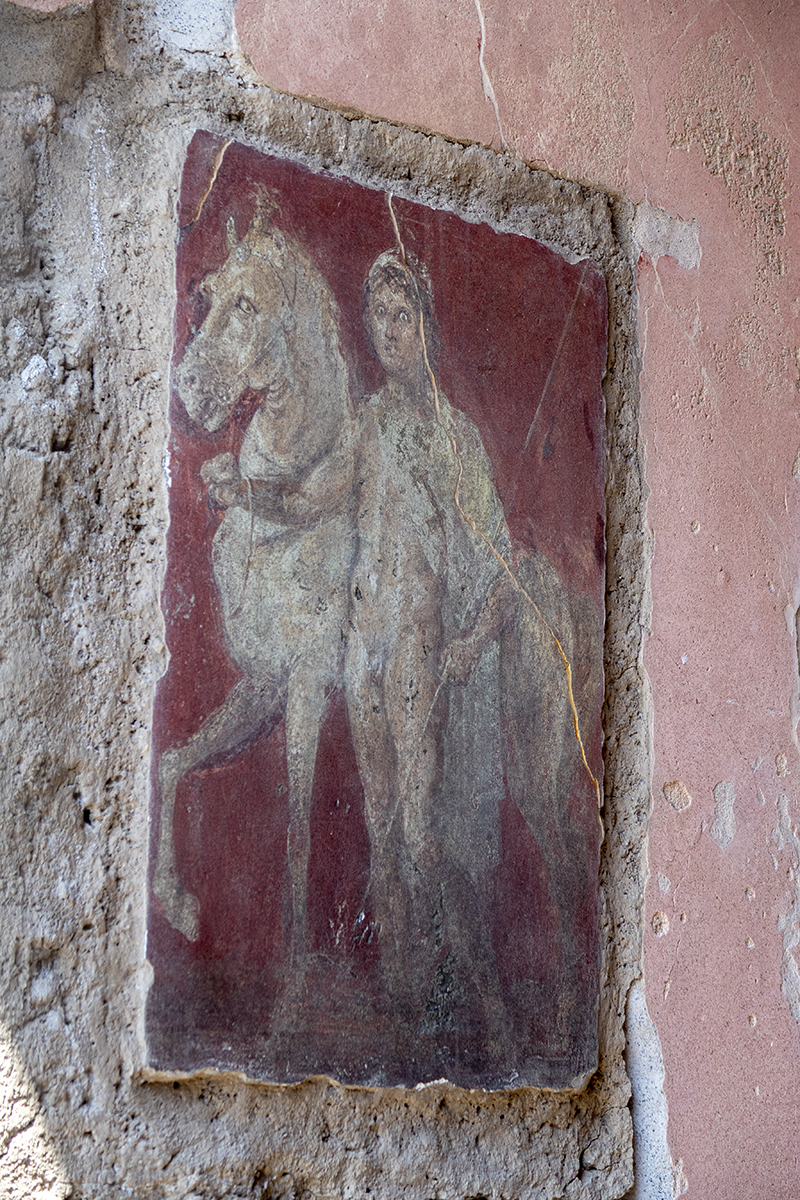
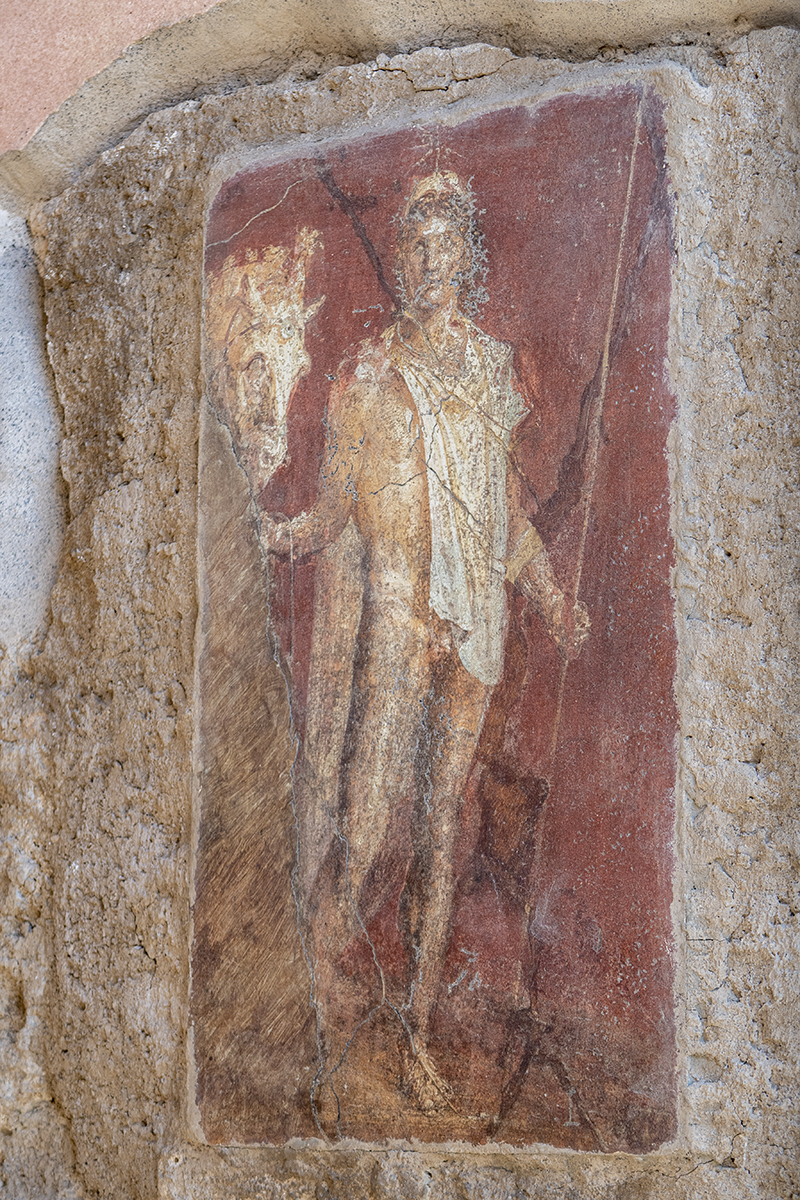
A pair of paintings at the entrance to the "House of the Dioscuri" in Pompeii.

After three months we sailed in an Alexandrian ship whose figurehead was the Twin Brothers, which had wintered at the island.

- "After three months": Based on Acts 27:9 and Acts 27:27, Ellicott calculated that the time of the sailing fell in beginning of February.
- "Whose figurehead was the Twin Brothers": translated from the Greek phrase παρασήμῳ Διοσκούροις parasēmō Dioskourois. The word "parasemo", that was attested in an ancient Greek dedicatory inscription, can be translated as "whose sign was" or "marked with the image or figure of". Cyril of Alexandria wrote about the Alexandrian method to decorate each side of the ship prow with figures of deities. "Twin Brothers" or "Dioscuri" refer to "Castor and Pollux" (King James Version), who were specially honored in the district of Cyrenaica, not far from Alexandria. Horace wrote of them (ca. 23 BCE) as "the children of Leda", and the “brothers of Helen, beaming stars”, because the constellation named after Castor and Pollux stars (Gemini) provides bright starlight for mariners, so they are honored as the protector gods of sailors. In his tale of shipwreck, Lucian of Samosata (second century CE) wrote about the important role of the Dioscuri for the safety of the ships, but Paul does not need other help than from God to get through the storm, so the mention here is purely about on the aspect of decoration.

== Paul's reception in Rome (verses 17–22) ==
Paul finally reached Rome, after a long journey starting in Acts 20:21 and, as a faithful Jew, he started by approaching the leaders of the Jewish community in Rome to request a fair hearing on his gospel. Significantly, the Jewish community in Rome shows an open-minded attitude (verse 22) with no sign of the animosity which Paul has encountered in Asia Minor (Acts 21:27–28), while Paul called the leaders of the community as 'brothers' (verse 17), and assured them that his appeal to Caesar does not imply any disloyalty to 'my nation' (verse 19), hoping to get them on his side before word arrived from Jerusalem (verse 21). The community saw Paul's teaching as related to the 'sect which is spoken against' (verse 21, cf. Luke 2:34), but they want to decide themselves (verse 22) as Paul preach to them in similar way as in all his trials, using the term 'hope of Israel' (as he said to Agrippa in Acts 26:6–8) to refer the 'waiting for the consolation of Israel' for those in the temple (Luke 2:25–38).

== Paul's last words (verses 23–31) ==
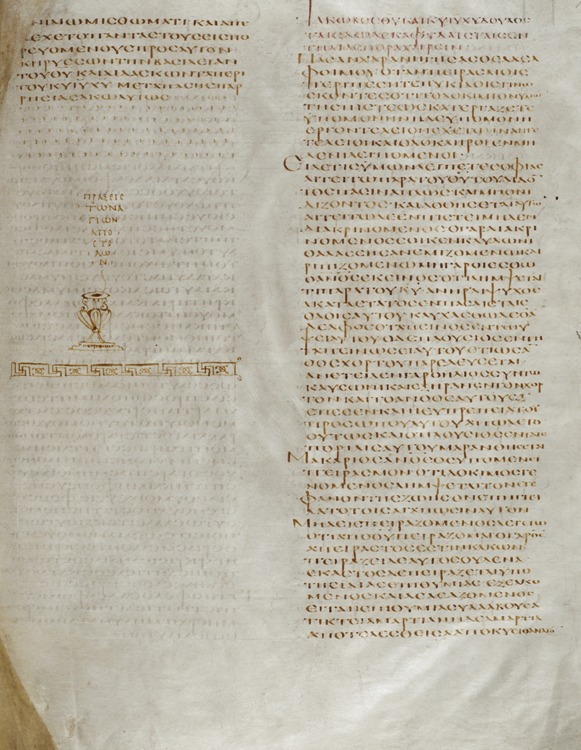
Acts 28:30-31 (end) and the Epistle of James 1:1-18 in Codex Alexandrinus (folio 76r) from 5th century

The content of Paul's preaching to the local community was not recorded, but it can be inferred as a repetition of the arguments presented elsewhere in the book of Acts (verse 23). Some listeners were 'convinced' (verse 24), but the overall state of the community at that time was 'disharmony' (verse 25, from Greek asymphonoi, "disagreed"). The prophecy in Isaiah 6:9–10 was cited (verses 26–27) to reflect Jewish rejection of Jesus as a tragic failure of 'this people' to 'take advantage of the proffered 'salvation' (verse 28: picking up earlier allusions to Isaiah in Acts 26:12—23), and related to Simeon's prophecy in Luke 2:30 (cf. Luke's citation in the parable of the sower (Luke 8:10) with Matthew 13:14–15; Mark 4:12). The final two verses of the chapter record Paul's continued witness to 'all who came' (that is, Jews as well as Gentiles, verse 30) over a two-year period with the confidence that the 'proclamation of the gospel will go on into an uncertain future with all boldness and without hindrance' (verse 31).

=== Verse 28 ===
[Paul said:] "Therefore let it be known to you that the salvation of God has been sent to the Gentiles, and they will hear it!"

There is a repeated pattern: 'Jewish rejection of the gospel leads to an emphasis on Gentile inclusion' (Acts 13:44-47).

=== Verse 31 ===
The narrative of Acts ends with Paul:

preaching the kingdom of God and teaching the things which concern the Lord Jesus Christ with all confidence, no one forbidding him.

- "No one forbidding him" is translated from Greek ἀκωλύτως, akōlytōs, "unhinderedly".

== See also ==
- Twin Brothers (Dioskouroi)
- Paul the Apostle
- Related Bible parts: Isaiah 6, Matthew 13, Acts 26, Acts 27

== Sources ==
- Coogan, Michael David (2007). Coogan, Michael David; Brettler, Marc Zvi; Newsom, Carol Ann; Perkins, Pheme (eds.). The New Oxford Annotated Bible with the Apocryphal/Deuterocanonical Books: New Revised Standard Version, Issue 48 (Augmented 3rd ed.). Oxford University Press. ISBN 9780195288810.
- Alexander, Loveday (2007). "62. Acts". In Barton, John; Muddiman, John (eds.). The Oxford Bible Commentary (first (paperback) ed.). Oxford University Press. pp. 1028–1061. ISBN 978-0199277186.
