= Fossarina (ship) =

Fossarina was the name of a number of ships, including:

- MV Fossarina
- SS Fossarina
