= Galia, Greece =

Galia Γαλιά
- Community
- Location within Greece
- Coordinates: 35°4′33″N 24°52′10″E
- Country: Greece
- Administrative region: Crete
- Regional unit: Heraklion
- Municipality: Faistos
- Municipal unit: Moires

Population (2021)
  - Community: 833
- Time zone: UTC+2 (EET)
  - Summer (DST): UTC+3 (EEST)

Galia (Greek: Γαλιά) is a village on the island of Crete, Greece, located 58 kilometres (36 mi) from Heraklion, and is administratively part of the municipal unit of Moires in the municipality of Faistos.

It lies at an altitude of 250 metres (820 ft), surrounded by hills. It commands an imposing view south to the Messara Plain and to the Asterousia mountain range, west to the Libyan Sea and north to the Psiloritis mountain. It has 833 residents (2021), mainly farmers.

Galia is one of the oldest villages in the area. It is mentioned in Venetian records as early as 1577, and as a village with 120 residents since 1583. The Renaissance tower in the village and the water fountains in the Kapeloniana area are proof of the passing of the Venetians. Part of the village, called Monohoro, is mentioned as early as 800. It is where the old church of the Virgin Mary, built in 852, is located.

The village was under Turkish occupation and later German during World War II. Galia is accessible from Mires either by car or by public bus.
