= Mavronisi =

Greek islet in the Libyan Sea

Native name: Μαυρονήσι
- Interactive map of Mavronisi

Geography
- Coordinates: 34°55′59″N 24°48′37″E
- Archipelago: Cretan Islands

Administration
- Greece
- Region: Crete
- Regional unit: Heraklion

Mavronisi (Greek: Μαυρονήσι, "black island") is a small islet off the southern coast of the Greek island of Crete and in the Libyan Sea. The islet is administered from Moires in Heraklion regional unit.
