= Matala, Crete =

Village in the Greek island of Crete

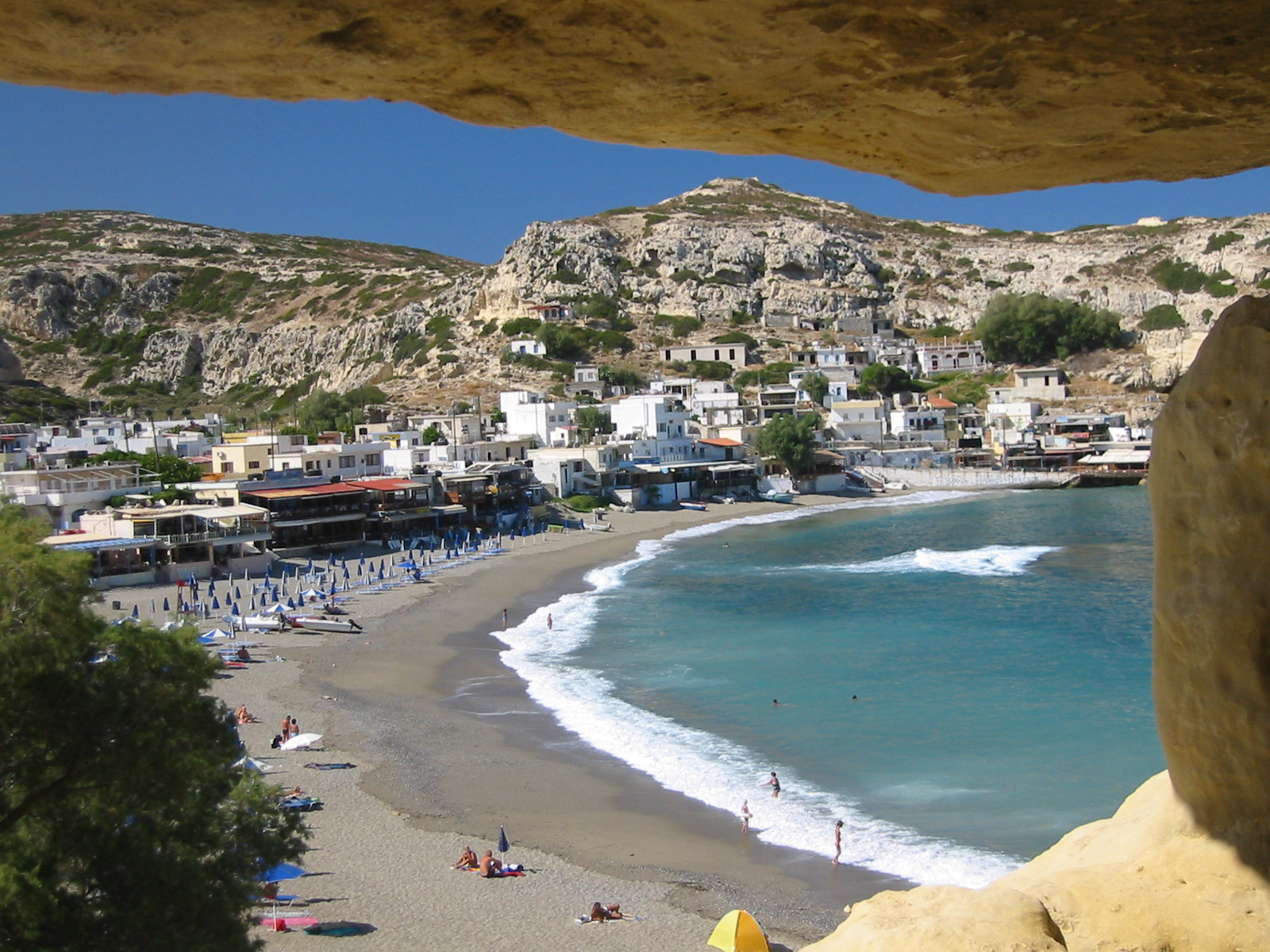
View of town

Matala (Greek: Μάταλα) is a village located 75 km south-west of Heraklion, Crete, Greece, north of Cape Lithinon. Matala is part of the community of Pitsidia within the municipal unit of Tympaki, Faistos municipality, Heraklion regional unit.

== History ==
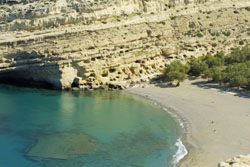
The caves of Matala.

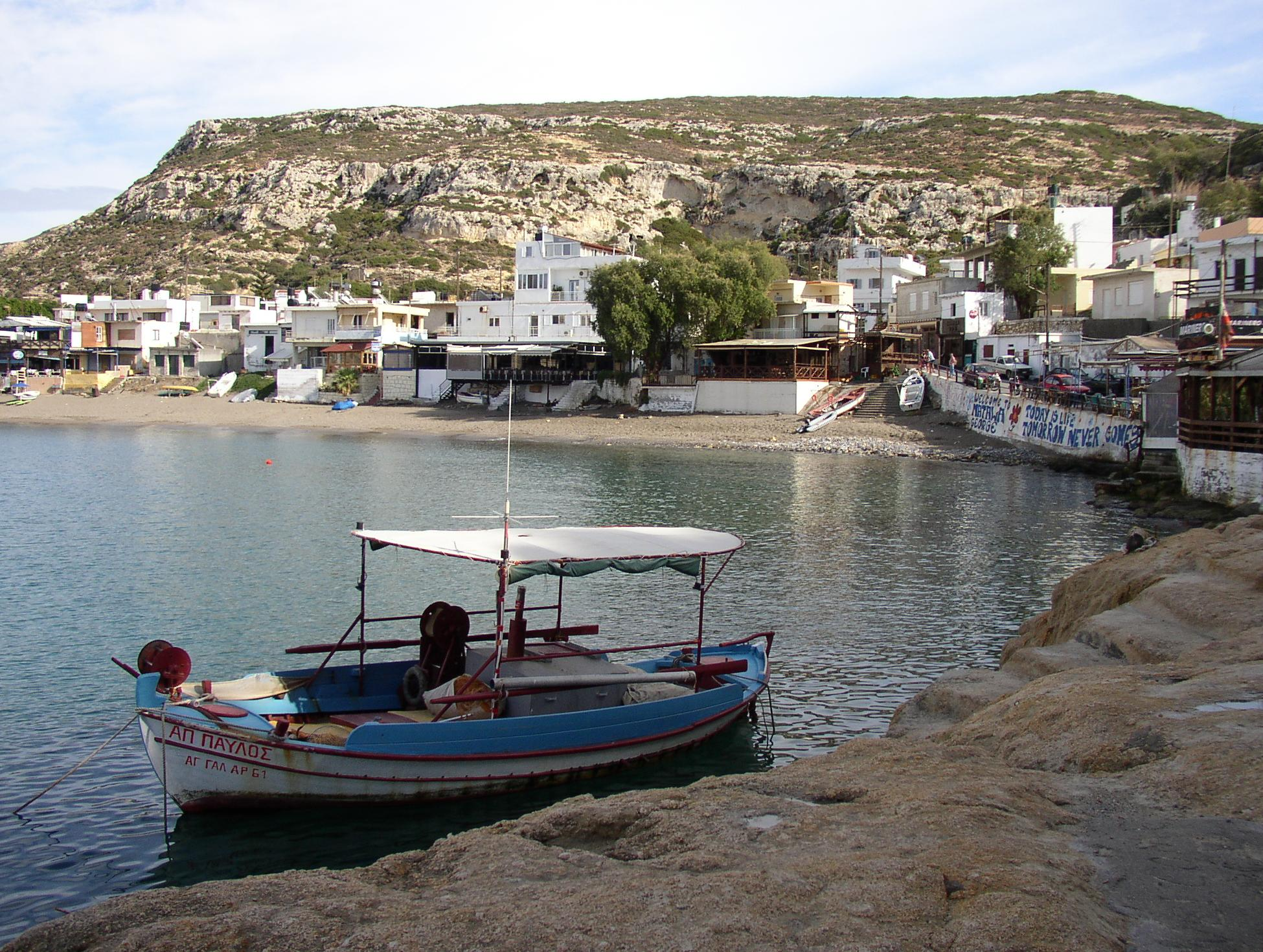
Southern part of the beach

The artificial caves in the cliff of the Matala bay were created in the Neolithic Age. Matala was the port of Phaistos during the Minoan period. In the year 220 BC, Matala was occupied by the Gortynians, and during the Roman period, Matala became the port of Gortys. It has been suggested that the caves were once used as tombs, but it is more likely that they were used as living spaces, given their volume (corpses do not need that much room to walk around). One of the caves is called "Brutospeliana" because according to the legend it was frequented by the Roman general Brutus.

Matala was then a fishing village. In the 1960s, the caves were occupied by hippies who were later driven out by the church and the military junta. Matala is now a popular tourist destination relying on coach tours and summer visitors. There are many gift shops and bars. Matala's hippie history is celebrated during the three-day Matala Beach Festival, held every June since 2011.

== Mythology ==
When Zeus in the form of a white bull seduced the princess Europa, he crossed the sea and brought her to the beach of Matala. There he changed into an eagle and flew her to Gortys where he had sex with her.

== Climate ==
Matala has a hot-summer Mediterranean climate (Köppen climate classification: Csa). Matala experiences hot, very dry summers and very mild, wet winters.

Climate data for Matala (1971-2000 modelled normals)
Month	Jan	Feb	Mar	Apr	May	Jun	Jul	Aug	Sep	Oct	Nov	Dec	Year
Mean daily maximum °C (°F)	15.79 (60.42)	15.57 (60.03)	16.79 (62.22)	19.93 (67.87)	23.79 (74.82)	27.88 (82.18)	30.10 (86.18)	29.59 (85.26)	27.09 (80.76)	24.13 (75.43)	20.28 (68.50)	17.49 (63.48)	22.37 (72.27)
Daily mean °C (°F)	12.57 (54.63)	12.40 (54.32)	13.80 (56.84)	16.76 (62.17)	20.52 (68.94)	24.64 (76.35)	27.14 (80.85)	26.58 (79.84)	24.41 (75.94)	20.84 (69.51)	17.47 (63.45)	14.83 (58.69)	19.19 (66.54)
Mean daily minimum °C (°F)	10.41 (50.74)	10.14 (50.25)	10.84 (51.51)	13.08 (55.54)	16.32 (61.38)	19.85 (67.73)	22.78 (73.00)	22.91 (73.24)	20.36 (68.65)	17.80 (64.04)	14.44 (57.99)	11.87 (53.37)	15.88 (60.58)
Average precipitation mm (inches)	123.01 (4.84)	78.86 (3.10)	52.39 (2.06)	16.90 (0.67)	5.71 (0.22)	0.66 (0.03)	0.14 (0.01)	0.16 (0.01)	7.31 (0.29)	34.72 (1.37)	69.58 (2.74)	101.56 (4.00)	491.00 (19.33)
Mean monthly sunshine hours	128.27	143.70	206.30	260.49	320.81	371.45	396.34	368.10	287.69	231.73	172.93	130.33	2,955.2
Source: Hellenic National Meteorological Service

== In popular culture ==
- In Command & Conquer: Generals Zero Hour, the USS Reagan, (Note: Unrelated to the real life USS Ronald Reagan.) along with the carrier support group docked in Matala and the naval base on the island, is destroyed by GLA forces .
- In Simon Scarrow's historical adventure novel, The Gladiator, the protagonists beach their damaged ship just outside Matala after it is damaged by a tsunami.
- Canadian singer and musician Joni Mitchell's experiences with the Matala hippies were immortalised in her songs "Carey" and "California", on her 1971 album "Blue". She spent several weeks living in Matala during early 1970.
