= Inatus =

Coordinates: 34°59′13″N 25°17′03″E

Inatus or Inatos (Ancient Greek: Ἴνατος), or Einatus or Einatos (Ἔινατος), was a city of ancient Crete, situated on a mountain and river of the same name. The Peutinger Table puts a place called Inata on a river 24 M.P. east of Lisia, and 32 M.P. west of Hierapytna. These distances, assuming Lisia is Lasaea agree well with the site near Tsoutsouros where modern scholars place Inatus. The goddess Eileithyia is said to have been worshipped here, and to have obtained one of her epithets, from it.
