= Fusinus (ship) =

Fusinus was the name of a number of ships, including:

- MV Fusinus
- SS Fusinus
