= Aristarchus of Thessalonica =

Biblical figure in Christianity

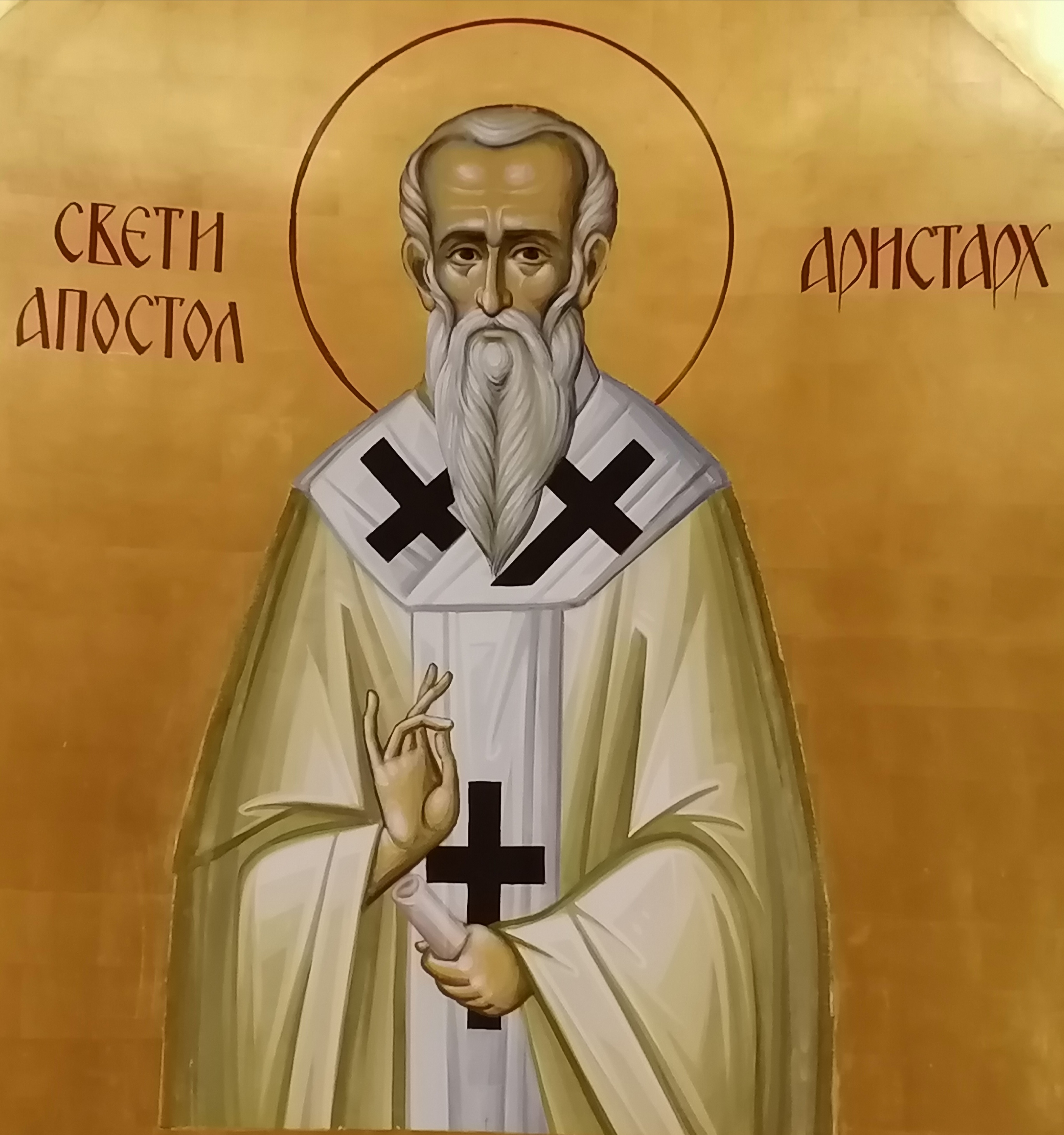

Aristarchus or Aristarch (Ancient Greek: Ἀρίσταρχος Aristarkhos), "a Macedonian of Thessalonica" (Acts 27:2), was an early Christian mentioned in a few passages of the New Testament. He accompanied Saint Paul on his journey to Rome. Along with Gaius, another Roman Macedonian, Aristarchus was seized by the mob at Ephesus and taken into the theater during the Ephesian riot (Acts 19:29). Later, Aristarchus returned with Paul from Greece to Asia (Acts 20:4). At Caesarea, he embarked with Paul on a ship of Adramyttium bound for Myra in Lycia (Acts 27:2); whether he traveled with him from there to Rome is not recorded. Aristarchus is described as Paul's "fellow prisoner" and "fellow laborer" in Colossians 4:10 and Philemon 1:24, respectively.

== Background ==
In Eastern Orthodox and Eastern Catholic tradition, Aristarchus is identified as one of the Seventy Apostles and bishop of Apamea. He is commemorated as a saint and martyr on January 4, April 14, and September 27. He is mentioned in the Roman Martyrology on August 4.

Aristarchus son of Aristarchus, a politarch of Thessalonica (39/38 BC?) may be the same person with Aristarchus.
