= Tympaki =

Tympaki Τυμπάκι
- Municipal unit
- Location within the regional unit

- Location within Greece
- Coordinates: 35°04′N 24°46′E
- Country: Greece
- Administrative region: Crete
- Regional unit: Heraklion
- Municipality: Faistos

Area
  - Municipal unit: 157.1 km^{2} (60.7 sq mi)
- Elevation: 29 m (95 ft)

Population (2021)
  - Municipal unit: 9,957
  - Municipal unit density: 63.38/km^{2} (164.2/sq mi)
  - Community: 5,515
- Time zone: UTC+2 (EET)
  - Summer (DST): UTC+3 (EEST)

Tympaki (Greek: Τυμπάκι) is a town and a former municipality in the Heraklion regional unit, Crete, Greece. Since the 2011 local government reforms, it is a part of the municipality of Faistos, of which it is a municipal unit, the unit has an area of 157.122 km^{2} (60.665 sq mi).

The town is located on the south coast, between Agia Galini and Matala. It has a population of about 5,500 people (10,000 for the municipal unit). In 2005, a major container harbour and free-trade zone had been rumored to be built in the area. As of January 2009, it appears the project has been canceled, in part due to the strong opposition from the local population.

== Geography & Climate ==
Tympaki is located in the southern coast of the island of Crete, in the regional unit of Heraklion. Tympaki features a hot-summer Mediterranean climate (Köppen: Csa) with hot, dry summers and mild, rainy winters.

Climate data for Tympaki Airport (1959-2010) 6 m asl
Month	Jan	Feb	Mar	Apr	May	Jun	Jul	Aug	Sep	Oct	Nov	Dec	Year
Mean daily maximum °C (°F)	15.9 (60.6)	15.9 (60.6)	17.7 (63.9)	20.7 (69.3)	24.6 (76.3)	28.9 (84.0)	31.9 (89.4)	31.9 (89.4)	28.8 (83.8)	25.0 (77.0)	21.2 (70.2)	17.6 (63.7)	23.3 (74.0)
Daily mean °C (°F)	11.7 (53.1)	11.8 (53.2)	13.5 (56.3)	16.5 (61.7)	20.7 (69.3)	25.1 (77.2)	27.9 (82.2)	27.7 (81.9)	24.4 (75.9)	20.4 (68.7)	16.4 (61.5)	13.3 (55.9)	19.1 (66.4)
Mean daily minimum °C (°F)	7.5 (45.5)	7.4 (45.3)	8.4 (47.1)	10.6 (51.1)	14.1 (57.4)	17.8 (64.0)	20.6 (69.1)	20.7 (69.3)	18.2 (64.8)	15.1 (59.2)	11.9 (53.4)	9.2 (48.6)	13.5 (56.2)
Average rainfall mm (inches)	93.7 (3.69)	67.3 (2.65)	43.6 (1.72)	20.1 (0.79)	9.3 (0.37)	1.1 (0.04)	0.1 (0.00)	0.5 (0.02)	12.0 (0.47)	45.6 (1.80)	74.2 (2.92)	107.1 (4.22)	474.6 (18.69)
Average rainy days (≥ 0.01 mm)	11.1	9.6	6.8	3.8	2.0	0.5	0.0	0.1	1.2	4.6	6.9	11.9	58.5
Average relative humidity (%)	72.7	71.3	69.9	67.1	63.6	57.1	50.7	52.0	58.8	65.5	70.8	73.2	64.4
Source: HNMS
