= Euroclydon =

Cyclonic northeast wind in the Mediterranean

Euroclydon (or in Latin: Euroaquilo) is a cyclonic tempestuous northeast wind which blows in the Mediterranean, mostly in autumn and winter. It is the modern Gregalia (Gregale) or Levanter. The name "Euroclydon" comes from two classical roots:

- the Ancient Greek word: εὐροκλύδων, romanized: eurokludōn, from Euros (Eurus, meaning 'east wind')
- either:
  - an Ancient Greek word: akulōn or akylōn, meaning 'north wind'); or kludon, referring to a surging wave (from the verb kluzo meaning 'to billow')
  - or the Latin word: aquilō (aquilon)

Although the Greek word is translated "northeaster" in many English Bibles, Euroclydon is not to be confused with the term "nor'easter", a type of extratropical cyclone affecting Atlantic coastal regions of the United States and Canada.

== Notable references ==
- In chapter 27 in the Book of Acts 27:14 it may specifically refer to the name of the Gregale wind from the Adriatic Gulf, which wrecked the apostle Paul's ship on the coast of Malta on his way to Rome.
- It is referenced in the second chapter of Moby-Dick.
- Euroclydon is also the name of an anthem by William Billings
- Referenced in "The Roman Centurion's Song" by Rudyard Kipling: "Here where our stiff-necked British oaks confront Euroclydon!"
- Referenced in Henry Wadsworth Longfellow's poem "Midnight Mass for the Dying Year".
- Referenced in Dorothy L. Sayers' novel The Nine Tailors where after a rainstorm, the Rector uses the phrase from Acts 27:14

== Sources ==
- Wiktionary article on Euroclydon
- Moby Dick Chapter 2
