= Carey (song) =

1971 single by Joni Mitchell

Single by Joni Mitchell

from the album Blue
- B-side: "This Flight Tonight"
- Released: 1971
- Recorded: 1971
- Studio: A&M (Hollywood, California)
- Genre: Folk rock, soft rock
- Length: 3:00
- Label: Reprise
- Songwriter: Joni Mitchell
- Producer: Joni Mitchell

Joni Mitchell singles chronology
| "Big Yellow Taxi" (1970) | "Carey" (1971) | "California" (1971) |

Official Audio
- "Carey" on YouTube

"Carey" is a song from the 1971 Joni Mitchell album Blue. It was inspired by her time spent with Cary Raditz, living with a cave-dwelling hippie community at Matala, on the Greek island of Crete.

== Background ==
In early 1970, Mitchell's relationship with Graham Nash had recently ended, and she decided to fly to Greece for a break, with a female friend. Mitchell's European travels, which also encompassed France and Spain, were intended as a "time out" from her increasing fame and fortune in the music business. After a few days in Athens the two friends traveled to Crete, rented a car, and drove to Matala on the south coast of the island.

There, Mitchell met a red-haired cane-carrying American, Cary Raditz, who was working as a cook at the Mermaid café (now the site of the Petra & Votsalo restaurant). She wrote the first version of "Carey" in Matala, for Raditz's 24th birthday. After about two months, she and Raditz traveled to Athens together, but Mitchell then flew alone to Paris, where she wrote "California", referring to Raditz as a "red, red rogue" and, on returning to the U.S., completed "Carey" together with other songs for the Blue album.

Although the song was sometimes rumoured to be about fellow singer-songwriter James Taylor, who plays guitar on some Blue tracks (although not on "Carey" itself) and with whom Mitchell had a brief affair, Mitchell stated publicly that the "Carey" in question was Cary Raditz. References to the village of Matala and the al fresco hippie lifestyle abound in the song lyrics. Mitchell frequently introduced live performances of "Carey" by recounting anecdotes about Raditz and their Cretan adventures.

In November 2014, The Wall Street Journal published interviews by Marc Myers with Mitchell and Raditz, about the background to the song. Mitchell said that she "latched on to Cary because he seemed fierce and kept the crowd off my back... I enjoyed Cary's company, and his audacity....[h]e was a bit of a scoundrel." Raditz said that his "cane" had in fact been a discarded shepherd's crook, and commented: "I liked Joni a lot and didn't like losing her company. But on the road, you already know the friendships you develop are short-lived. That's built into the experience."

== Recording and release ==
While in Europe, Mitchell taught herself to play the Appalachian dulcimer, which was to become a feature of her musical output in the following years. Her dulcimer skills were first showcased on Blue and in particular the original recording of "Carey", which also features Stephen Stills on bass and acoustic guitar. "Carey" was released as a single, debuting at number 93 on the Billboard Chart on September 4, 1971, and lasting just one week; nevertheless, it remains one of Mitchell's most enduring and popular songs.

In 1971, Record World called "Carey" "a tune that others are sure to record."

== Personnel ==
According to the liner notes:

- Joni Mitchell – production, Appalachian dulcimer, acoustic guitar, vocals
- Russ Kunkel – drums
- Stephen Stills – bass guitar, guitar

== Albums ==
"Carey" appears on two Joni Mitchell greatest hits albums – Hits (1996) and Dreamland: The Very Best of Joni Mitchell (2004).

Mitchell herself performed a different interpretation of Carey on her 1974 live album Miles of Aisles. Backed by jazz band Tom Scott & The LA Express, and recorded at the Universal Amphitheater in Los Angeles, this reggae/ska version has been criticised by Stephen Davis in Rolling Stone, who went so far as to say that the song was "murdered".

== Cover versions ==
In 1972, actress Goldie Hawn recorded her version of the song for her album Goldie (Warner MS 2061). Kiki Dee issued a live version of the song on her 1995 album Almost Naked. At the televised 2000 tribute concert to Mitchell, held at the Hammerstein Ballroom, New York, the song was performed by Cyndi Lauper.

At the Library of Congress Gershwin Prize concert in 2023 honoring Mitchell, Carey was performed by Marcus Mumford as the opening number, with Raditz in attendance in the audience.

== Charts ==
Chart performance for "Carey"
| Chart (1971) | Peak position |
|---|---|
| Canada Top Singles (RPM) | 27 |
| US Billboard Hot 100 | 93 |
| US Cash Box Top 100 | 92 |
