= Lasaea =

Coordinates: 34°56′26″N 24°48′40″E

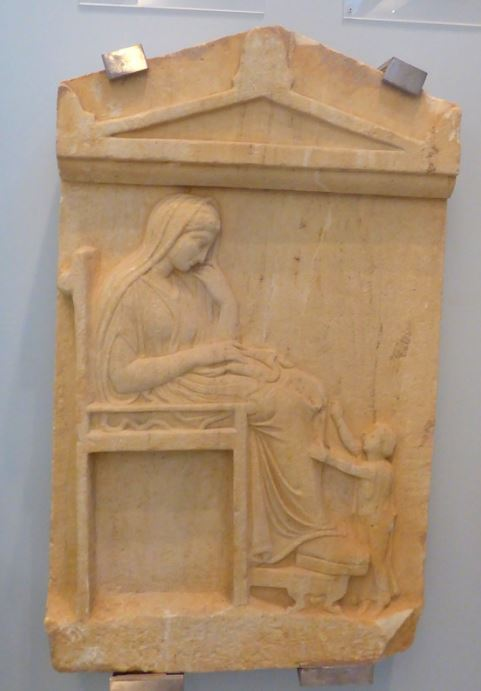
Hellenistic grave stone found at Lasaea

Lasaea or Lasaia (Ancient Greek: Λασαία) was a city on the south coast of ancient Crete, near the roadstead of the "Fair Havens" where apostle Paul landed. This place is not mentioned by any other writer, under this name but is probably the same as the Lisia of the Peutinger Table, 16 M.P. to the east of Gortyna. Some manuscripts have Lasea; others, Alassa. The Vulgate reads Thalassa, which Theodore Beza contended was the true name. According to the Stadiasmus Maris Magni, which calls the place Halas (Άλας), it had a harbour and was located 50 stadia from Leben and 80 stadia from Matala.

The site of Lasaea is located near modern Kaloi Limenes (meaning 'Fair Havens'), opposite Trafos island.
