= SEKA (oil company) =

Greek petroleum company

SEKA Bunkering Stations S.A. is a Greek-based, independent oil company, specializing in ships' fuels and lubricants.

== History ==
SEKA was established in the early 1960s by the late Greek tycoon Nikos Vardinogiannis in Kaloi Limenes, Crete, in Greece. The name is the acronym of the words "Fuels Bunkering Station" ("Stathmos Ephodiasmou Kafsimon") in Greek. The company continues to market ships' fuels and lubricants, from that location as well as from Corinth and Piraeus and is a major bunkering supplier in Greece.

== See also ==
- Energy in Greece
