= Cape Lithinon =

Promontory at the southernmost point of Crete, Greece

Coordinates: 34.93°N 24.74°E

Cape Lithinon or Cape Lithino, Crete, Greece, is a promontory at the southernmost point of the island of Crete, south of Matala and west of Kaloi Limenes. It marks the southeastern limit of the Bay of Mesara. The promontory rises to about 390 m (Mt. Kefali) and drops off precipitously into the water to the south. It is located in Faistos municipality.

A map of Crete, with Cape Lithinon labeled

It is one of the possible locations for Cape Charax, near which the Arab pirates landed in the 820s and began their conquest of the island.
