= Blue (Joni Mitchell album) =

Studio album by Joni Mitchell
- Released: June 22, 1971
- Recorded: January–March 1971
- Studio: A&M Studio C (Hollywood)
- Genre: Folk
- Length: 35:39
- Label: Reprise
- Producer: Joni Mitchell

Joni Mitchell chronology
Ladies of the Canyon (1970)	Blue (1971)	For the Roses (1972)

Singles from Blue
- 1. "Carey" Released: July 1971; 2. "California" Released: October 1971

Blue is the fourth studio album by the Canadian singer-songwriter Joni Mitchell. It was released on June 22, 1971, through Reprise Records. The album was entirely written and produced by Mitchell, and was recorded throughout late 1970 and early 1971 at A&M Studios in Hollywood. Created in the aftermath of her breakup with Graham Nash and during an intense relationship with James Taylor, Blue explores the different facets of relationships against sparse musical backings featuring Mitchell's acoustic guitar, piano and Appalachian dulcimer.

Upon release, Blue was a critical and commercial success. It reached the top 10 in the UK and Canada, and the top 15 in the US, while its first single, "Carey" was Mitchell's second to crack the Billboard Hot 100. It received positive reviews, though Mitchell would reject the "confessional" label many critics would impose on her in the wake of the album.

Retrospectively, Blue is regarded as Mitchell's masterpiece. Rolling Stone included the album at number three on their list of the 500 Greatest Albums of All Time, and the album frequently appears on other similar lists. It has been noted for its influence on the singer-songwriter movement and its songs have been covered by a wide range of artists. In 1986, Blue was certified Platinum by the Recording Industry Association of America (RIAA) for US sales in excess of 1 million copies.

== Background ==
Mitchell's stature as an artist and performer grew throughout 1970, and her album Ladies of the Canyon was a critical and commercial success. She was voted the world's top female singer in a Melody Maker poll that year, and in August, she played the Isle of Wight Festival. Biographer Brian Hinton describes this experience as a "public initiation under fire", due to the hostile, drug-addled audience and behind-the-scenes conflicts. Despite her heightened success, this was a tumultuous period for Mitchell, who had ended her relationship with fellow musician Graham Nash in 1969. At the time of the breakup, Mitchell went on a trip to Greece and throughout Europe as a whole, a sojourn which led to the creation of some of the material on Blue.

At the tail end of 1970, Mitchell played a Greenpeace benefit concert, Amchitka, with James Taylor, with whom she was romantically involved. Biographer David Yaffe notes that despite their seemingly idealistic connection, both were troubled by personal demons, including Taylor's bouts of depression and heroin addiction. Yaffe also states that while their relationship would not last, Mitchell "stayed with him, long enough and deep enough that she emerged with a batch of new songs, some of them darker and more disturbing than ever." This period leading up to the creation of Blue was extremely emotionally taxing for Mitchell, with "years of bottled-up melancholy pouring out", which she attributed to past and then-current events such as giving her daughter up for adoption, her dissolved marriage to Chuck Mitchell, and the relationships which followed.

== Writing and recording ==
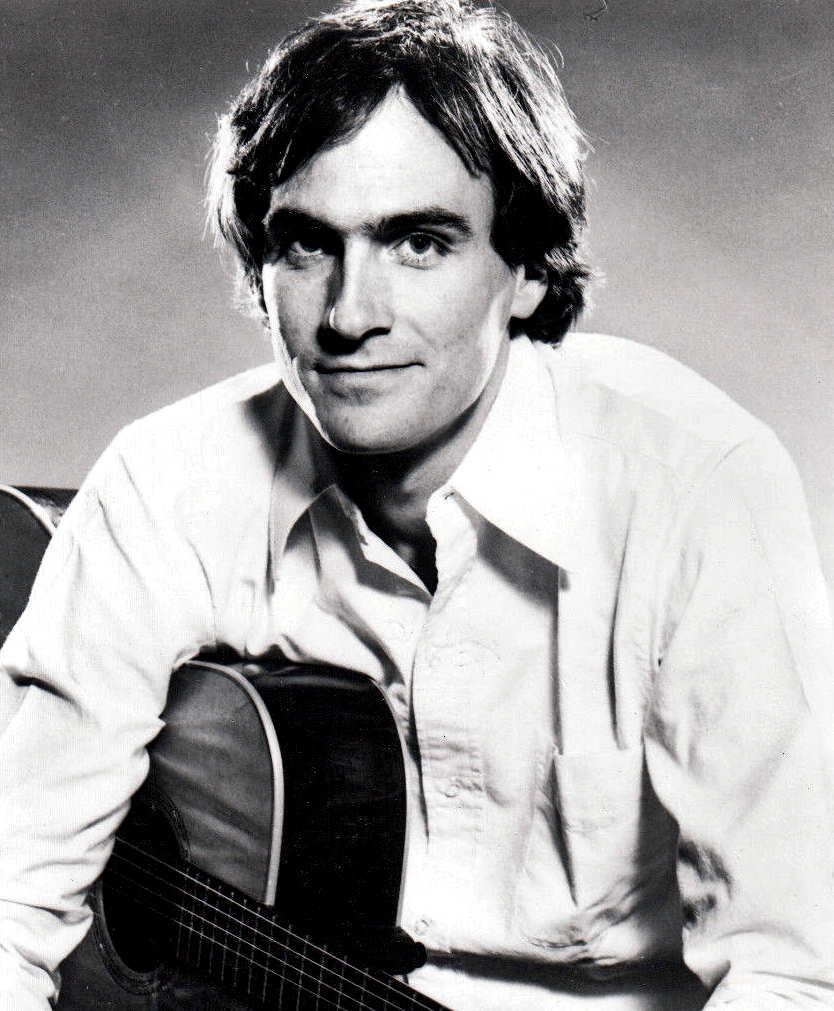
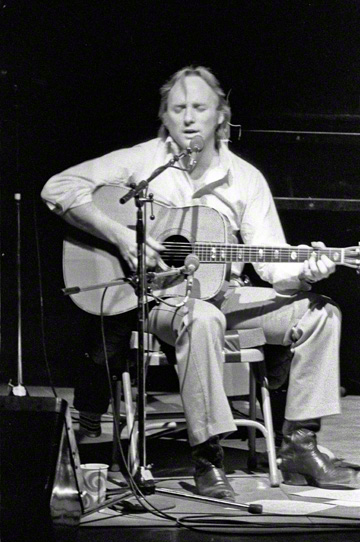
James Taylor (left) and Stephen Stills (right) are among the few additional musicians to appear on Blue.

Mitchell wrote most of the songs on Blue and played on the Appalachian dulcimer, an instrument she discovered at the 1969 Big Sur Folk Festival and brought with her during her trip to Greece that same year. The dulcimer was custom-built and sold to her at the festival by luthier Joellen Lapidus for $200; Lapidus nicknamed the instrument the "Wild Columbine" for its carved sound holes. Yaffe notes how Mitchell's guitar playing style had developed around this time, a percussive, "slap"-heavy style which displayed the influence of Stephen Stills's "aggressive" guitar playing yet remained "inimitably hers".

Of the songs written for the album, "All I Want" and "The Last Time I Saw Richard" were the final two songs composed. Conversely, "Little Green" dated back to 1966 and was copyrighted in 1967, before Mitchell released her first studio album. According to Peter Kearns, a lyrical sketch dating back to the spring of 1970 appears to have been the genesis of "My Old Man". Mitchell performed an unfinished version of the song in September at the BBC Television Centre. "Carey" was one of the album's songs stemming from Mitchell's 1970 Greece trip, and was inspired by a "fiery red-headed and red-bearded man wearing a white turban" named Carey Raditz whom she met in a restaurant. The initial draft was meaner, which Mitchell has said was in response to the man's own unkind attitude, while the final cut was rewritten to have a lighter mood. Stills contributed bass and acoustic guitar on the track, which was originally slated to be the album opener.

As with her previous two albums, Mitchell recorded Blue at A&M Studios in Hollywood, Los Angeles. At this time, fellow singer-songwriter Carole King was recording Tapestry (1971) in Studio B. King recalled in her memoir the communal, cordial atmosphere between the artists in close proximity, and Mitchell provided backing vocals on both King's Tapestry and Taylor's Mud Slide Slim and the Blue Horizon (1971). Mitchell recorded in Studio C, which contained a coveted red Steinway piano; both King and Mitchell vied for Studio C to use said piano, with Mitchell reserving the room most often. James Taylor contributed acoustic guitar to "All I Want", "California" and "A Case of You". Taylor later remarked that engineer Henry Lewy pushed the musicians to "keep it simple" when recording, though Taylor also felt the sparseness of the arrangements allowed him creative freedom: "Playing along with her spare dulcimer accompaniment, I was free to substitute whatever chords I felt." Percussion was provided by session drummer Russ Kunkel. Aside from the few guest musicians, Blue was recorded "in near-seclusion", due in part to Mitchell's emotional state at the time. Mitchell later said, "we had to lock the doors to make that album". Recording was completed in March 1971. An early track listing for the album had been delivered to Reprise, which opened with "Carey" and closed with "River". This early track order contained two songs that would be cut from the final album, "Hunter" and "Urge for Going". Both of these were replaced by the album's final opener and closer, "All I Want" and "The Last Time I Saw Richard", after Mitchell urged Reprise to halt the pressing.

== Music and lyrics ==
=== Side one ===
The Blue album, there's hardly a dishonest note in the vocals. At that period of my life, I had no personal defenses. I felt like a cellophane wrapper on a pack of cigarettes. I felt like I had absolutely no secrets from the world, and I couldn't pretend in my life to be strong. Or to be happy. But the advantage of it in the music was that there were no defenses there either.

— Mitchell in a 1979 interview with Cameron Crowe

The album opens with "All I Want", displaying the musical palette of dulcimer, guitar and percussion. Yaffe notes that this dulcimer is the very first sound the listener hears on Blue, with its "jangl[ing]" chords and riff being comparable to "the starting of an engine". According to Karen O'Brien, the song reflects both the "ambivalence of a love affair", as well as the "impeccable intentions" which "accompany the doubts" within said relationship. Simon Vozick-Levinson of Rolling Stone Australia notes that the lyrics' "punch-drunk rhyming schemes" evoke the "rush" of a new romantic relationship, while Mitchell searches for "an ideal kind of relationship, one that's freeing for everyone involved, and perhaps one that's too good to exist." "My Old Man" is more upbeat, describing what O'Brien calls a "love affair without regrets or doubts". Due to the more optimistic tone of the song, Yaffe considers it a "reminder of an earlier time, a sweetness of the past." Kearns highlights the song's "quazi-jazz piano arpeggios", "staccato 8th-note coda", and "quirky hook" as defining musical characteristics, also noting similarities in mood to King's "It's Too Late" (1971). Peter Kearns describes "Little Green" as a "major-key lullaby" with a "hint of melancholy". Some biographers have described the lyrics as "impenetrable" and "cryptic", though its meaning has become more widely recognized in later years as being about Mitchell's daughter whom she gave up for adoption in 1965. Despite its melancholic tone, some writers also note an optimistic side to the song, with O'Brien finding it to be "full of promise for a happier life ahead than the one Joni felt she could provide for the child".

"Carey" returns the album to a more "light and positive" mood, which Kearns describes as somewhat "exotic" due to the use of congas and dulcimer. O'Brien describes the genre as "pre-reggae calypso" with lyrics inspired by her encounter with Raditz in Greece. Hinton finds the song to be a "return to nature" and rock-and-roll, with the music driven by Kunkel's percussion. In a 2014 interview with the Wall Street Journal, Mitchell remarked that the lyrics captured her at a time where her "hair was matted from washing it in seawater for months, I had beach tar on my feet and I was flea-bitten – this was very rugged living. I also realized I was still heartbroken about my split with Graham [Nash]." The first side of the album concludes with its title track, which Kearns describes as simply "a human working through whatever dark feelings were coming up – composition as therapy". The lyric "Acid booze and ass / Needles, guns and grass" has spawned multiple interpretations; O'Brien cites this line in summarizing the song as a "cautionary tale of the other diversions sought by the Me Generation", while Kearns considers it to be a list of "options for coping with [an] emotional affliction". Hinton notes the juxtaposition of the "symbolic and the gross", going on to state that while the song can be considered a lullaby, it is one "to a damaged adult, and one full of pain."

=== Side two ===
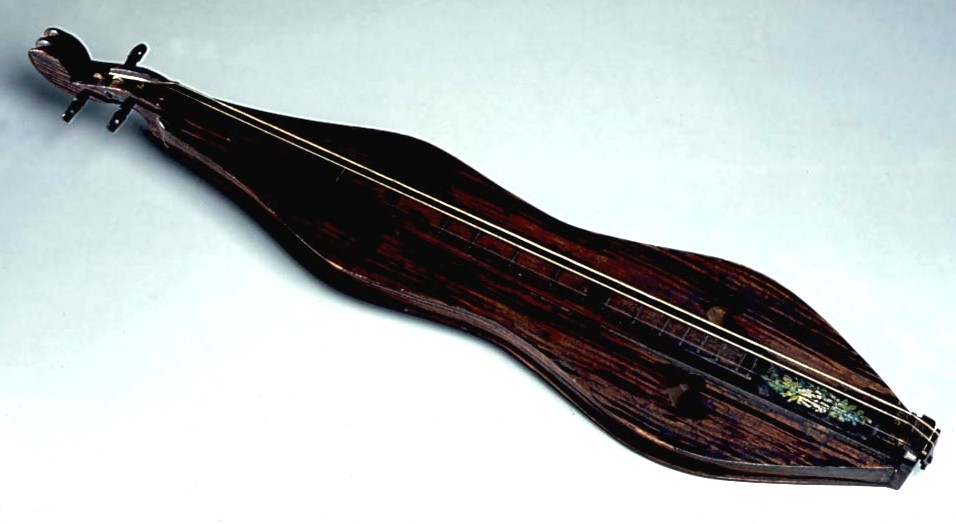
Songs such as "All I Want", "California" and "A Case of You" highlight Mitchell's use of the Appalachian dulcimer.

The album's second side begins with "California", which Kearns describes as a diary entry spurred by Mitchell's homesickness for California while traveling through France. The song contains further lyrical references to Raditz, described as the "redneck on a Grecian isle". The lyrics juxtapose "news of the deepening conflict in Vietnam destroying dreams of peace and love" with Mitchell's desire to "run back to the safety of home" and themes of homesickness. Yaffe considers the song a "portrait" of both Mitchell and the listener "at the dawn of the 1970s". "This Flight Tonight" is played in a low, A-flat open tuning which creates a sound Kearns likens to a "world music vibe" similar to that of Led Zeppelin's "Friends" (1970). He considers the track to be one of the album's "more challenging" compositions, calling it a "thinking-man's deep-cut" with "semi-psychedelic" elements. Hinton describes Mitchell's vocal as "startlingly intimate", while Yaffe notes the song as one which describes the narrator's attachment to a lover who is a "composite" of real people, rather than being inspired by one person in particular.

Both Hinton and O'Brien have described "River" as the "saddest" Christmas or festive song ever written. Hinton presumes that the song, a "song of escape from someone who has already escaped", refers to Mitchell's relationship with Nash. Aside from its musical references to "Jingle Bells", Kearns considers "River" to be moreso a "breakup song" in which "Christmas [has] merely set the scene for the contemplation" over the relationship's end. "A Case of You" is the final track to meld Mitchell's percussive dulcimer with Taylor's guitar. The song has long been thought to refer to Mitchell's relationship with Cohen, while its second verse contains explicit references to Cohen's mother. O'Brien considers this track to be one of Mitchell's "most sensual and visceral" compositions, due to its references to the Holy Communion which illustrate "the lover's essence [turning] into sacred wine coursing through the bloodstream." Kearns highlights the closing chord with its lack of resolution to the "home key" for highlighting the "intuitively unfinished" nature of the narrator's emotional state. The album closes with "The Last Time I Saw Richard", a piano ballad thought to be about Mitchell's ex-husband Chuck Mitchell. The lyrics harken back to Mitchell's days in Detroit in the mid-1960s; O'Brien notes that the lyrics appear to "break all of the rules of lyric-writing", yet it "works remarkably", having the feel of "a spoken-word prose poem [rather] than a song."

== Release and reception ==
Blue was released on June 22, 1971, through Reprise Records. According to Yaffe, its cover is a departure from the "playful", self-created artwork of Mitchell's past three albums. It features a photograph taken by Tim Considine, who "shot her singing, possibly in ecstasy, possibly in sorrow, probably in both, [as] she is sinking into the color blue." According to Joel Bernstein, the photo had been taken years prior to the release of the album, "at the Troubadour in 1967 or 68." The album was a commercial success upon release, reaching number 15 in the US and number three in the UK, being described by Hinton as "a million-seller at a time when such feats were exceptional." Its first single, "Carey", was released in July 1971 in the US and Canada with "This Flight Tonight" as the B-side. It reached number 93 in the US, becoming Mitchell's second charting single there, and was a top 40 hit in Canada. "California" was chosen as the second single, released in October, with "A Case of You" on the B-side. According to Yaffe, Blue has, over time, surpassed Court and Spark (1974) as Mitchell's best-selling album, with US sales exceeding 10 million copies. The album received a Platinum certification by the RIAA in 1986 for US sales in excess of 1,000,000 copies.

=== Contemporary reviews ===
Blue was met with critical acclaim upon release, and some reviewers deemed the record Mitchell's best to date. One such review came from Jack Lloyd of The Philadelphia Inquirer, who declared Mitchell had been "writ[ing] some of the most personal music being turned out these days", further praising her as a "charming story teller and a skilled musician", with songs that "are disarmingly simple on the surface, yet totally unique in construction and execution." Robert Christgau also considered Blue to be Mitchell's best release thus far, calling it a "pioneering exploration of the fitful joys of buy-now, pay-later love". Peter Reilly of Stereo Review considered the album to be an expansion on the tradition of torch songs, with an added "satirical" element to the lyrics which are sometimes directed at herself, and other times at her partners. While Reilly considered this "balanced dispassion" to be one of the album's strengths, he found its largest success to be within its "message of survival", citing the lyrics of the title track as a "pointed and pertinent warning to that part of a generation that talks a lot about getting it all together but begins to seem less and less capable of really doing so." Peter Goddard of the Saskatoon Star Phoenix noted growth in Mitchell's work through Blue's "less operatic and diffuse" melodies, more varied musical accompaniments, and the "richer, less keening" sound of her vocals.

Reviewers made note of the album's autobiographical material and its emotional complexity. Tom Priddy of The Greenville News praised Mitchell's "slightly old-fashioned romanticism", describing the songs as "simpler here than they were" in her past albums and summarizing the record as a "lovely album". While Melody Maker had reservations about the "inward-looking" lyrics (in comparison to what they considered to be the "universal" truths of her past compositions), they also found the album to be "musically (and in particular, melodically) stronger and more assured" than Mitchell's past work. Robert Hilburn of the Los Angeles Times considered the album a strong contender for the best of 1971, praising it as a "marvelously sensitive portrait of love and romance". Hilburn lauded the arrangements for having "just the right amount of restraint", while also highlighting the "multi-faceted" emotions of the songs. Nancy Harris of the Fairbanks Daily News-Miner praised the album for containing both "deeper lyrics" and "more complex melodies" while also retaining a "very involving, listenable sound". Harris summarized the record as one which "beautifully capture[s] some more of those elusive human experiences" and turns them into "poetically intricate" compositions.

=== Aftermath ===
Some of Mitchell's contemporaries expressed surprise at the personal and vulnerable nature of Blue. After being played the album, Kris Kristofferson reportedly told Mitchell, "God, Joan, save something of yourself", leading Mitchell to suggest that he was "embarrassed" by the record. In an interview from the mid-1970s, Sandy Denny expressed unease at the emotional content of the album, stating: "I adore Joni Mitchell but I do think she went around wearing her heart on her sleeve. I adore listening to those songs but I wouldn't like it to be me who's painting it around for everyone to know. The last thing I'd want everyone to know is my business."

Mitchell later expressed dislike for the "confessional" tag applied to her in the wake of Blue. She has said that reviewers who use the descriptor are "miss[ing] the point", due to there being "too much emphasis put on the artist and not enough on the art", also finding the term to be "insulting". Writers also likened her writing to that of "confessional" authors such as Sylvia Plath and Anne Sexton, whom Mitchell felt she had "nothing in common" with.

=== Retrospective reviews ===
Retrospective reviews
Review scores
Source	Rating
AllMusic	5/5 stars
Christgau's Record Guide	A
The Encyclopedia of Popular Music	5/5 stars
MusicHound Rock	5/5 stars
Pitchfork	10/10
The Rolling Stone Album Guide	5/5 stars

Retrospective reviews of Blue are extremely positive, typically awarding perfect scores and declaring it as one of the greatest albums of all time. AllMusic's Jason Ankeny declared it to be "the quintessential confessional singer/songwriter album", summarizing its songs as "raw nerves, tales of love and loss etched with stunning complexity" and highlighting "Little Green" and the title track as moments where Mitchell "raise[s] the stakes of confessional folk-pop to new levels of honesty and openness". Jessica Hopper of Pitchfork rated the album a 10/10, describing it as "possibly the most gutting break-up album ever made". Clare Flynn of NPR praised the record for its use of timeless language, noting that aside from a few select phrases, Mitchell "sings about love in a way that would be relevant in any time period." Los Angeles Times writer Jenn Pelly characterized Mitchell's writing on Blue as "illuminated pop literature", commenting that it "does not feel unreasonable" to call the album's compositions "sacred".

The Rolling Stone Album Guide stated that the album is "arguably" Mitchell's masterpiece, seeing her "pick memorable vignettes out of the flood of memories and reflections that accompany an extended journey". Uncut described the record as a "masterpiece made out of restless travel and doomed love affairs", summarizing it as "sad, funny, poetic, revelatory and often achingly candid". The Times echoed the album's "masterpiece" designation, finding it "still holds up as the beacon of the era of singer-songwriters" and describing it as "an expression of pure intimacy". Jack Hamilton of The Atlantic heralded Blue as "the greatest relationship album ever". Ultimate Classic Rock's Michael Gallucci praised the album for "reveal[ing] rare vulnerability" at a time when "the charts [were] dominated by macho braggarts" such as the Rolling Stones and Rod Stewart.

== Legacy ==
Blue continues to be held in high regard for its cultural longevity and influence on a variety of musicians. Uncut noted the album's stature as a "landmark against which the work of all confessional singer-songwriters [has] been measured." Parade writer Andrea Reiher cited Blue as a "turning point" in both Mitchell's career and the arc of popular music as a whole, noting its immense influence across a wide variety of genres, as well as its longevity and ability to resonate with younger audiences. Singer-songwriter Taylor Swift has called Blue her favorite album of all time; it has been cited as a significant influence on her album Red (2012). Bob Dylan's "Tangled Up in Blue" namechecks the album within its title, while the original recordings for Blood on the Tracks (1975) have been noted as heavily influenced by the work of Mitchell. American rock band Haim also cited Blue, specifically its title track, as a reference point for their album Women in Music Pt. III (2020), with the band describing it as a "security blanket" during the members' personal troubles at the time. Elton John has described Blue as Mitchell's "masterpiece", highlighting "Little Green" as its "most poignant, emotionally heavy" song; John further noted the subconscious influence of Mitchell on his own music, such as on his song "Madman Across the Water" (1971). David Crosby declared it to be "the best singer-songwriter record ever made", considering it superior to the work of the Beatles, Dylan, and Paul Simon.

"A Case of You" has been covered by a wide range of artists, including k.d. lang, Nancy Wilson, James Blake, Prince (as "A Case of U") and Tori Amos. "River" has received status as a "holiday classic"; Mitchell's official website notes the existence of over 1,000 covers of the song. "This Flight Tonight" became a hit single for Scottish rock band Nazareth in 1973, with their cover reaching the top 20 in the UK and number one in Germany. In late 2025, actress Amanda Seyfried went viral for her vocal-and-dulcimer performance of "California" on The Tonight Show Starring Jimmy Fallon.

Blue frequently appears on lists of the best albums ever made, best albums of the 1970s, and best albums made by female artists. Rolling Stone placed it at number three on their list of the 500 Greatest Albums of All Time; the album was placed at number 63 on NME's similar list, and has also appeared on such lists by Consequence, Entertainment Weekly, Stylus, and Time. It has been ranked as one of the best albums of the 1970s by Pitchfork, the BBC, GQ, Ultimate Classic Rock, and Paste, and ranked as the best album made by a female artist by NPR.

== Track listing ==
All tracks are written by Joni Mitchell.

Side one
No.	Title	Length
1.	"All I Want"	3:32
2.	"My Old Man"	3:33
3.	"Little Green"	3:25
4.	"Carey"	3:00
5.	"Blue"	3:00
Total length:		16:30

Side two
No.	Title	Length
1.	"California"	3:48
2.	"This Flight Tonight"	2:48
3.	"River"	4:00
4.	"A Case of You"	4:20
5.	"The Last Time I Saw Richard"	4:13
Total length:		19:09

== Personnel ==
Adapted from the album liner notes:

Musicians

- Joni Mitchell – acoustic guitar, Appalachian dulcimer, piano, vocals
- James Taylor – guitar (1, 6, 9)
- Stephen Stills – bass (4), guitar (4)
- Sneaky Pete – pedal steel guitar (6, 7)
- Russ Kunkel – drums (4, 6, 9)

Technical

- Joni Mitchell – producer
- Henry Lewy – engineer

Packaging

- Gary Burden – art direction
- Tim Considine – photography

== Charts ==
=== Weekly charts ===
1971 chart performance for Blue
Chart (1971)	Peak position
Canada Top 100 Albums (RPM)	9
Norwegian Albums (VG-lista)	24
UK Albums (Official Charts)	3
US Billboard 200	15
US Cash Box Top 100 Albums	14

2019 chart performance for Blue
Chart (2019)	Peak position
US Indie Store Album Sales (Billboard)	24

2021 chart performance for Blue
Chart (2021–2022)	Peak position
Belgian Albums (Ultratop Flanders)	44
Hungarian Albums (MAHASZ)	23
Scottish Albums (Official Charts)	30
US Americana/Folk Albums (Billboard)	5
US Top Rock Albums (Billboard)	46

== Certifications ==
Certifications for Blue
Region	Certification	Certified units/sales
Australia (ARIA)	Gold	35,000^{^}
Denmark (IFPI Danmark)	Platinum	20,000^{‡}
United Kingdom (BPI)	2× Platinum	600,000^{^}
United States (RIAA)	Platinum	1,000,000^{^}
^{^} Shipments figures based on certification alone.^{‡} Sales+streaming figures based on certification alone.
