= California (Joni Mitchell song) =

Single by Joni Mitchell

from the album Blue
- B-side: "A Case of You"
- Released: 1971
- Recorded: 1971
- Studio: A&M (Hollywood, California)
- Genre: Folk rock
- Length: 3:48
- Label: Reprise
- Songwriter: Joni Mitchell
- Producer: Joni Mitchell

Joni Mitchell singles chronology
"Carey" (1971)	"California" (1971)	"You Turn Me On, I'm a Radio" (1972)

Official audio
- "California" on YouTube

"California" is a song written by Joni Mitchell that first appeared on her 1971 album Blue. It was also released as the second single from the album, as a follow-up to "Carey".

== Background ==
Mitchell described the song as a "letter back home". While on her travels in Europe, Mitchell wrote the first verse of the song in Paris, France, wrote the second verse in Spain, while longing for the creative climate she had experienced in California, where the last verse was completed.

== Composition and reviews ==
In the song, she expresses the depth of her longing for California despite considering herself a member of the counterculture. Like "Carey", "California" takes the form of a travelogue, and uses a stream of consciousness narrative technique. Pitchfork critic Jessica Hopper describes both songs as "how-Joni-got-her-groove-back ditties". The lyrics tell of her time in France, an excursion to a Greek island, and a trip she took to Spain. At the end of each story in each location, she expresses her desire to be back in California. The person that "Carey" was based on also appears in the second verse of "California". According to author Larry David Smith, Mitchell uses the descriptions in "California" as a strategy to demonstrate "principles associated with the Earth Mother manifesto."

"California" uses a verse-bridge structure. James Taylor plays guitar, Sneaky Pete Kleinow pedal steel guitar, Russ Kunkel drums and percussion. According to singer Estrella Berosini, the recitative phrasing Mitchell uses on "California" was influenced by California singer Laura Allan. According to Rolling Stone critic Timothy Crouse, the song "jumps along in quick bursts", but the refrain is "flowing" with tango elements. Crouse praised the "subtlety" of the production, particularly "James Taylor's twitchy guitar and Russ Kunkel's superb, barely detectable high-hat and bass-pedal work."

Critic Kim Ruehl called "California" one of the highlights of Blue, describing it as "personal and largely sentimental." Cash Box said it was "within the basic framework of most of Joni's previous material except for a most unusual melody." Record World said it was a "beauty" and had Mitchell's "distinctive, personal stamp on it."

"California" was included on Mitchell's 1998 compilation album Hits and on her self-chosen 2004 compilation album Dreamland.

== Covers and legacy ==
American group Wilson Phillips covered the song as the title track to their 2004 studio album California.

Bob Dylan played Mitchell's recording on the "California" episode of Season 2 of his Theme Time Radio Hour show in 2007.

"California" is quoted in the 2014 film Wild, in which Cheryl Strayed (as played by Reese Witherspoon) writes the line "Will you take me as I am?" in the Pacific Crest Trail register on day 9 of her journey.

During an appearance on The Tonight Show Starring Jimmy Fallon in March 2025, actress-singer Amanda Seyfried performed the first verse of "California" while playing the Appalachian dulcimer. Her rendition earned praise from critics and viewers, with some positively comparing her voice to Mitchell's. "California" enjoyed a 794% increase in on-demand U.S. streams after Seyfried's cover went viral.

== Personnel ==
- Joni Mitchell – Appalachian dulcimer, guitar, vocals
- James Taylor – guitar
- Sneaky Pete Kleinow – pedal steel
- Russ Kunkel – percussion
