= Moires =

Moires Μοίρες
- Municipal unit
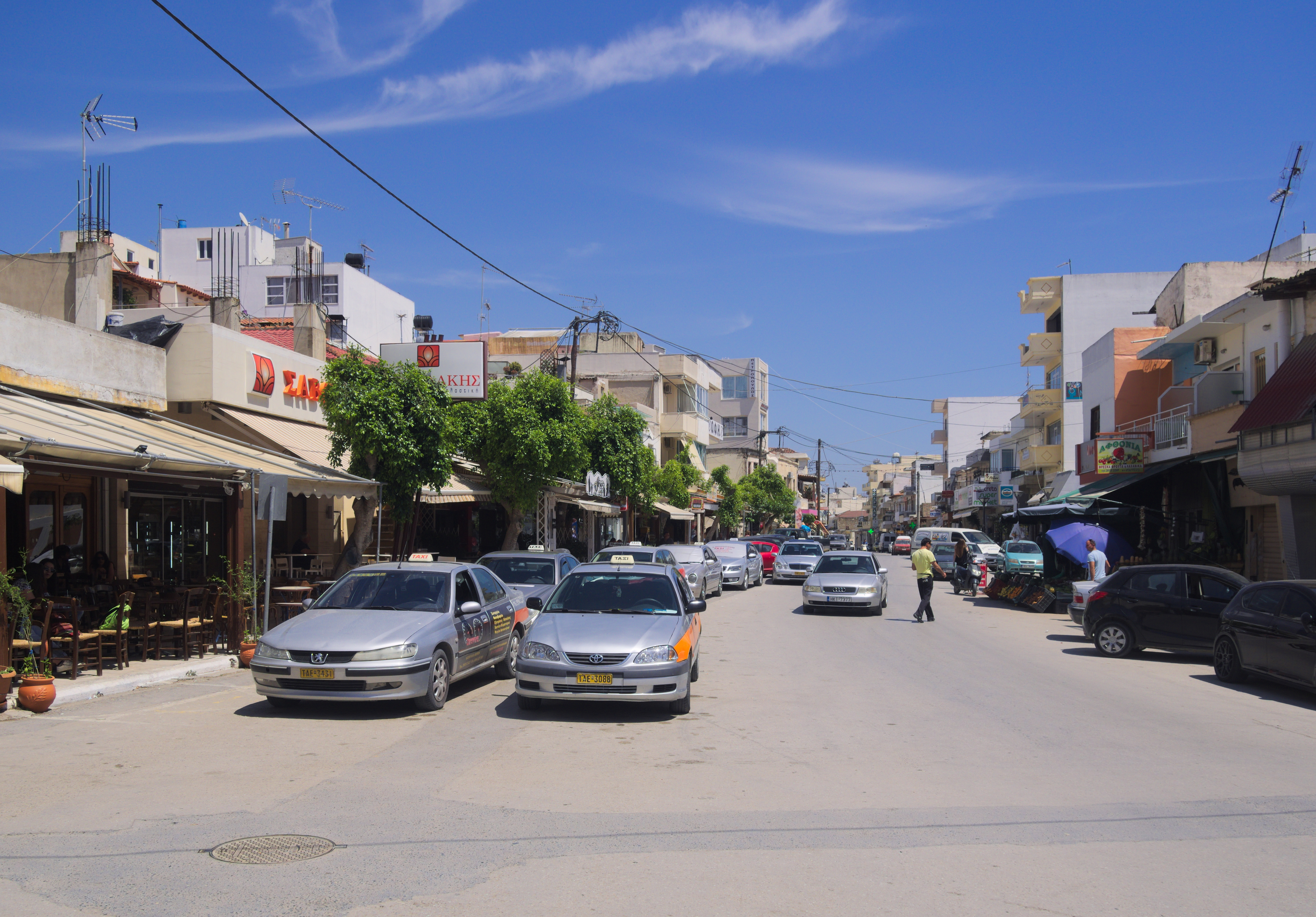
- The centre of Moires

- Location within the regional unit

- Location within Greece
- Coordinates: 35°03′N 24°52′E
- Country: Greece
- Administrative region: Crete
- Regional unit: Heraklion
- Municipality: Faistos

Area
  - Municipal unit: 181.9 km^{2} (70.2 sq mi)
- Elevation: 90 m (300 ft)

Population (2021)
  - Municipal unit: 11,399
  - Municipal unit density: 62.67/km^{2} (162.3/sq mi)
  - Community: 6,869
- Time zone: UTC+2 (EET)
  - Summer (DST): UTC+3 (EEST)

Moires (Greek: Μοίρες, "Fates") is a town and a former municipality in the Heraklion regional unit, Crete, Greece. Since the 2011 local government reform it is part of the municipality Faistos, of which it is a municipal unit. The municipal unit has an area of 181.885 km^{2} (70.226 sq mi) and a population of 11,399 people (about 6,900 for the town itself). The weekly market of the agricultural town of Moires is the largest in the region. In the early Middle Ages it was the home of Christian hermits, who allegedly met only once a year to worship at the chapel of Agios Andonis, built in the 14th or 15th century.

== Subdivisions ==
The municipal unit of Moires is divided into the following communities:

- Moires
- Alithini
- Antiskari
- Galia
- Kastelli
- Kouses
- Peri
- Petrokefali
- Pigaidakia (including Kaloi Limenes)
- Pompia
- Roufas
- Skourvoula

== Population ==
Population of the community of Moires

Year	Pop.	±%
1900	240	—
1928	553	+130.4%
1940	1,093	+97.6%
1951	1,674	+53.2%
1961	2,195	+31.1%
1971	2,948	+34.3%

Year	Pop.	±%
1981	3,501	+18.8%
1991	4,571	+30.6%
2001	6,026	+31.8%
2011	6,496	+7.8%
2021	6,869	+5.7%

Source: Population censuses

== Climate ==
Moires has a mild climate throughout the year with mild winters and hot summers. The climate is generally dry with an average annual precipitation of 445 mm. According to the National Observatory of Athens maximum temperatures in the winter remain over 16 °C while in the summer they are close to 35 °C.

Climate data for Moires (2010–2019)
Month	Jan	Feb	Mar	Apr	May	Jun	Jul	Aug	Sep	Oct	Nov	Dec	Year
Mean daily maximum °C (°F)	16.0 (60.8)	17.2 (63.0)	19.2 (66.6)	23.0 (73.4)	26.7 (80.1)	31.3 (88.3)	34.5 (94.1)	34.6 (94.3)	30.9 (87.6)	26.2 (79.2)	22.1 (71.8)	17.7 (63.9)	25.0 (76.9)
Mean daily minimum °C (°F)	6.2 (43.2)	6.9 (44.4)	8.0 (46.4)	10.5 (50.9)	14.4 (57.9)	18.5 (65.3)	20.8 (69.4)	21.0 (69.8)	18.1 (64.6)	14.9 (58.8)	11.3 (52.3)	7.4 (45.3)	13.2 (55.7)
Average rainfall mm (inches)	106.0 (4.17)	80.0 (3.15)	45.0 (1.77)	17.0 (0.67)	8.0 (0.31)	2.0 (0.08)	0.0 (0.0)	1.0 (0.04)	8.0 (0.31)	38.0 (1.50)	52.0 (2.05)	88.0 (3.46)	445 (17.51)
Source: National Observatory of Athens
