= Uncial 0166 =

- New Testament manuscript
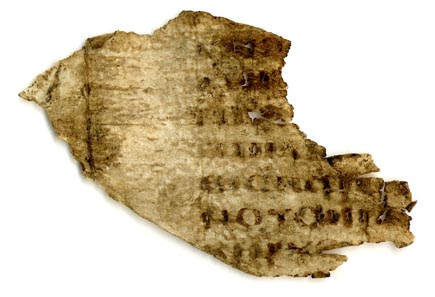
- James 1:11
- Text: Acts 28:30-31; James 1:11
- Date: 5th century
- Script: Greek
- Found: 1905
- Now at: University of Heidelberg
- Size: 5 x 7.4 cm
- Type: mixed
- Category: III

Uncial 0166 (in the Gregory-Aland numbering), is a Greek uncial manuscript of the New Testament, dated paleographically to the 5th century.

== Description ==
The codex contains a small parts of the Acts of the Apostles 28:30-31 (recto); James 1:11 (verso), on the fragment of one parchment leaf (5 cm by 7.4 cm). The text is written in two columns per page, 28 lines per page, in small uncial letters. It has breathings and accents.

The fragment contains 9 lines with 99 letters from 219 original.

Kurt Aland the Greek text of this codex placed in Category III.

Page recto (Acts 28:30-31)

ΕΝ]ΕΜ[ΕΙΝΕΝ] ΔΕ
ΔΙΕΤΙΑΝ ΟΛΗΝ ΕΝ ΙΔΙΩ
ΜΙΣΘΩΜΑΤΙ ΚΑΙ
ΑΠΕΔΕ[ΧΕΤΟ]
ΠΑΝΤΑΣ [ΤΟΥΣ]
ΕΙΣΠΟΡΕΥΟ[ΜΕ]
ΝΟΥΣ ΠΡΟ[Σ ΑΥΤΟΝ]
ΚΗΡΥΣ[ΣΩΝ ΤΗΝ
[ΒΑΣ]ΙΛ[ΕΙΑΝ]

Page verso (James 1:11)

[ΚΑ]Υ[Σ]ΟΝ[Ι]
[ΚΑΙ ΕΞΗΡΑΝ]ΕΝ ΤΟ
[Ν ΧΟΡΤΟΝ ΚΑ]Ι ΤΟ Α
[ΝΘΟΣ ΑΥΤΟΥ] ΕΞΕΠΕ
[ΣΕΝ ΚΑΙ] Η ΕΥΠΡΕ
[ΠΕΙΑ Τ]ΟΥ ΠΡΟΣΩΠΟΥ
[ΑΥΤΟ]Υ ΑΠΩΛΕΤΟ
[ΟΥΤΩΣ ΚΑΙ Ο ΠΛΟΥΣΙΟΙΣ
[ΕΝ Τ]ΑΙ[Σ ΠΟΡΕΙΑΙΣ]

== History ==
Currently it is dated by the INTF to the 5th century. The manuscript was found in Egypt. It is the last uncial manuscript added to the list of New Testament manuscripts by Gregory.

The codex currently is housed at the University of Heidelberg (Pap. 1357) in Heidelberg.

== See also ==
- List of New Testament uncials
- Textual criticism
