= List of Empire ships (Ta–Te) =

== Suffix beginning with T ==
=== Empire Tadpole ===
Empire Tadpole was a 1,752 GRT tanker built as a cargo ship by Sunderland Shipbuilding Co. Completed in 1910 as Saskatoon. Sold in 1927 to Canada Steamship Lines and renamed Rosemount. On 24 November 1934, she sank at Century Coal Dock, Montreal. She was raised on 15 May 1934, declared a constructive total loss and sold for use as a grain store. In 1940 she was sold to Branch Lines Ltd, rebuilt as a tanker and renamed Willowbranch. In 1945 she was sold to the MoWT and renamed Empire Tadpole. Sold in 1947 to Bulk Storage Co Ltd, London and renamed Basingcreek. Sold in 1950 to Coastal Tankers Ltd, Montreal and renamed Coastal Creek. Sold in 1964 to Canadian Sealakers Ltd, Edmundston, New Brunswick. Sold in 1964 to Hall Corporation of Canada and renamed Creek Transport. Sold in 1968 to McNamara Corporation Ontario and renamed Île de Montreal. Sold in 1976 to Richelieu Dredging Corporation, Montreal, then sold in 1977 to Nittolo Metal Corporation, Quebec. Reported to have been scrapped in 1986.

=== Empire Taff ===
Empire Taff was a steel-hulled cargo steamship. She was built in Germany in 1927 for Dampfschifffahrts-Gesellschaft „Neptun“ as Apollo. In 1945 the United Kingdom seized her as war reparations, and renamed her Empire Taff. In 1947 the UK government sold her to a Scottish shipping company, which renamed her Alhama. She was scrapped in Scotland in 1953.

She was the second of three DG „Neptun“ ships to be named after the ancient Greek god Apollo. The first was an iron-hulled steamship that was built by Möller & Holberg, Stettin, in 1883, requisitioned by the Imperial German Navy in 1914, and last recorded in Lloyd's Register in 1920. The third was a motor ship that was built by Nobiskrug GmbH, Rendsburg, West Germany in 1957, sold and renamed Peliki in 1972, and scrapped in 1984.

=== Empire Tagalam ===
Empire Tagalam was a 10,401 GRT tanker built by F Schichau, Danzig. Completed in 1936 as Paul Harneit for Deutsche-Amerikanische Petroleum, Hamburg. Seized in May 1945 at Brunsbüttel. To MoWT and renamed Empire Tagalam. Allocated in 1946 to the United States, transferred to the United States Maritime Commission (USMC). Sold in 1947 to Marine Transport Lines, New York and renamed Tagalam. Sold in 1955 to Pioneer Shipping Corp, Liberia and renamed Cassian Sea. Scrapped in 1960 at Split, Yugoslavia.

=== Empire Taganax ===
Empire Taganax was a 10,128 GRT tanker built by Nakskov Skibs. Akt., Nakskov, Denmark. Completed in 1940 for A P Moller, Copenhagen. Seized by Germany in 1940 and renamed Hydra. Seized in May 1945 in an extensively damaged condition at Kiel. Repaired, to MoWT in 1946 and renamed Empire Taganax. Sold in 1947 to St Helier Shipowners and renamed Busen Star. Operated under the management of Falkland Whaling Co, London. Scrapped in 1961 at Rotterdam, Netherlands.

=== Empire Tagathel ===
Empire Tagathel was the intended name of a 10,802 GRT tanker built by Burmeister & Wain, Copenhagen. Launched in 1940 as Théodora for Compagnie Auxiliare de Navigation, Paris. Seized by Germany and completed in 1941 as Heide for J T Essberger, Hamburg. Seized in May 1945 at Kiel. To MoWT, intended to be renamed Empire Tagathel but transferred to the French government and then returned to Compagnie Auliliare de Navigation and renamed Théodora. Sold in 1960 to Société Anonyme Monegasque D'Armement de Navigation, Monte Carlo and renamed Isly. Sold in 1961 to C Audibert, Monte Carlo and renamed Orval. Used as an oil storage and depot ship at Djibouti by Société de Travaux Transportes Maritimes, Paris. Scrapped in February 1965 at Split, Yugoslavia.

=== Empire Tagealand ===
Empire Tagealand was a 6,492 GRT tanker built by AG Weser, Bremen. Completed in 1927 as Mittelmeer for J T Essberger, Hamburg. Requisitioned by the Kriegsmarine in 1940. Seized in May 1945 at Brunsbüttel. To MoWT and renamed Empire Tagealand. Allocated in 1946 to USSR and renamed Pamir. Removed from shipping registers in 1961.

=== Empire Tageos ===
Empire Tageos was a 6,487 GRT tanker built by AG Weser, Bremen. Completed in 1927 as Adria for J T Essberger, Hamburg. Requisitioned by the Kriegsmarine in 1940. Seized in May 1945 at Kiel. To MoWT and renamed Empire Tageos. Allocated in 1946 to USSR and renamed Kazbek. Sold in 1947 to Gdynia America Line, Poland and renamed Karpaty. Scrapped in 1958 at Spezia, Italy.

=== Empire Taginda ===
Empire Taginda was a 2,846 GRT tanker built by F Krupp AG, Kiel. Completed in 1922 as Rudolph Albrecht for Max Albrecht Kommandit, Hamburg. Requisitioned by the Kriegsmarine in 1940. Seized in May 1945 at Kiel. To MoWT and renamed Empire Taginda. Sold in 1947 to Salvedor Co Ltd and renamed Basingstream. Operated under the management of Philip Bauer, London. Sold in 1949 to Ship Finance & Management Ltd, London and renamed Oilstream. Sold in 1952 to George Nicolau Ltd, Greece and renamed Vrissi. Scrapped in November 1960 at Spezia, Italy.

=== Empire Tagralia ===
Empire Tagralia was a 5,824 GRT tanker built by Kockums Mekaniska Verksted, Malmö. Completed in 1929 as Max Albrecht for Max Albrecht Kommandit, Hamburg. On 30 August 1939, she sailed from Houston and put into El Ferrol where she was interned. Surrendered in May 1945, to MoWT and renamed Empire Tagralia. Sold in 1947 to Basra Steam Shipping Co, London and renamed Repton. Sold in 1952 to Lloyd Siciliano di Armamento, Palermo and renamed Alcantara. Scrapped in September 1960 at Vado Ligure, Italy.

=== Empire Taj ===
Empire Taj was a 3,065 GRT tanker built by the Toledo Shipbuilding Company, Toledo, Ohio. Completed in 1912 as L V Stoddard. Sold in 1914 to Sinclair Navigation Co, USA and renamed Walter Hardcastle. Renamed W L Connelly in 1917. Sold in 1938 to Enrico Insom, Italy and renamed Barbara. Seized on 25 August 1941 by the Royal Navy at Bandar Shapur, Iran. Towed to Karachi, Pakistan. To MoWT and renamed Empire Taj. Laid up in 1948 at Abadan, Iran. Sold in October 1949 to the Pakistan Navy and renamed Attock. Used as a fuel hulk at Karachi.

=== Empire Takoradi ===
Empire Takoradi was a 7,318 GRT cargo ship built by William Gray & Co Ltd, West Hartlepool. Launched on 29 December 1944 and completed in March 1945. Sold in 1948 to A Weir & Co Ltd and renamed Shielbank. Sold in 1956 to Compagnia de Navigazione Andes, Panama. Operated under the management of F D'Amico, Italy. Sold in 1962 to Compagnia Baleniera Italiana SpA, Italy. Arrived on 2 November 1964 at Spezia, Italy for scrapping.

=== Empire Talisman ===
Empire Talisman was a 7,201 GRT cargo ship built by Lithgows Ltd, Port Glasgow. Launched on 20 April 1944 and completed in June 1944. Sold in 1949 to Blue Star Line and renamed Tacoma Star. Sold in 1957 to Lamport & Holt Line and renamed Murillo. Arrived on 16 March 1961 at Vigo, Spain for scrapping.

=== Empire Tamar ===
Empire Tamar was a 6,640 cargo ship built by Workman, Clark & Co Ltd, Belfast. Completed in 1907 as Kia Ora. Sold in 1935 to Achille Lauro & Co, Naples and renamed Verbania. Detained on 10 June 1940 at Port Said, Egypt by the Suez Canal authorities. Seized in July 1940 at Haifa, Palestine. To MoWT in 1941 and renamed Empire Tamar. Sunk in June 1944 as part of Gooseberry 5, Sword Beach, Ouistreham, Calvados.

=== Empire Tana ===
Empire Tana was a 6,275 GRT cargo ship built by Stabilimento Tecnico Triestino, Trieste. Completed in 1923 as Carso for Lloyd Triestino. Scuttled on 14 February 1941 at Kismayu, Italian Somaliland when port was captured by British forces. To MoWT and renamed Empire Tana. On 9 February 1944 she was extensively damaged in a multiple collision in fog off Casablanca, Morocco. The other ships involved were Dunav, Jaarstroom, Shirrabank and Winsum. Empire Tana was declared not worthy of repair. Sunk in June 1944 as part of Gooseberry 5, Sword Beach, Ouistreham. Wreck raised in 1947 and towed by tug Zealandia to Strangford Lough, Northern Ireland for scrapping.

=== Empire Tapley ===
Empire Tapley was a 305 GRT coastal tanker built by I Pimblott & Sons Ltd, Northwich. Launched on 12 August 1944 and completed in January 1945. Sold in 1946 to A/S Tankskibsrederiet, Denmark and renamed Haifa. Operated under the management of K V Tersling, Denmark. Sold in 1957 to Rederi A/B Castor, Sweden. Rebuilt and lengthened, now 365 GRT (536 DWT), renamed Nord. Sold in 1960 to S P Christensen, Denmark and renamed Soren Rask. A new diesel engine was fitted in 1964. Sold in 1973 to Argonaftis Argo Maritime, Greece and renamed Doriforos. Sold in 1980 to Cyprus Star Shipping Co, Cyprus and renamed Cyprus Star. Renamed Newluck in 1981. Scrapped in December 1986 at Barry, Wales.

=== Empire Tarne ===
Empire Tarne was the intended name of an 8,800 GRT cargo ship built by Bremer Vulkan Schiff- und Maschinenbau, Vegesack. Completed in 1913 as Sierra Salvada. Sold in 1917 to Lloyd Brasileiro, Brazil and renamed Avare. Sold in 1925 to Società Servizi Marittimi, Italy and renamed Peer Gynt then Neptunia. Sold in 1927 to Hamburg America Line and renamed Oceana. Requisitioned in 1940 by the Kriegsmarine. Used as an Accommodation ship at Gdynia and then Stettin. Seized in May 1945 at Flensburg and reflagged to the United Kingdom. Damaged on 13 October 1945 near Heligoland (54°00′N 07°52′E) by a mine while repatriating German internees to Hamburg. Towed to Hamburg and repaired. Intended to be renamed Empire Tarne in 1946 but allocated to USSR and renamed Sibir. Used as a depot ship on the Soviet Pacific coast. Scrapped in 1963 at Vladivostok.

=== Empire Tarpon ===
Empire Tarpon was a 6,216 GRT cargo ship built by Groton Iron Works, Groton, Connecticut. Completed in 1920 at Hopatcong for the United States Shipping Board (USSB). Sold in 1930 to Jersey American Steamship Corp. Sold in March 1931 to Boston I & M Co, resold to Shephard Steamship Co, Boston and renamed Harpoon. To MoWT in 1940 and renamed Empire Tarpon. On 6 October 1942 she was in distress 500 nautical miles (930 km) west of Lewis, Outer Hebrides (57°20′N 15°09′W). Taken in tow but abandoned on 13 October and sank on 14 October 20 nautical miles (37 km) west of South Uist, Hebrides (57°24′N 07°45′W).

=== Empire Tavistock ===
Empire Tavistock was a 798 GRT coastal tanker built by Grangemouth Dockyard Co Ltd, Grangemouth. Launched on 29 January 1945 and completed in April 1945. Sold in 1946 to Van Castricum & Co Ltd, London and renamed Sobat. Sold in 1951 to F. T. Everard & Sons Ltd and renamed Allegrity. On 13 December 1961 she ran aground at Greeb Point, to the west of Dodman Point, Cornwall. Refloated by the tide, drifted and grounded at Veryan Beach. Capsized on 22 December and declared a total loss. On Veryan Beach, her 14 crewmen were rescued by the Falmouth lifeboat.

=== Empire Tavoy ===
Empire Tavoy was a 7,381 GRT cargo ship built by William Doxford & Sons Ltd, Sunderland. Launched on 2 October 1944 and completed in February 1945. Sold in 1946 to Leeds Shipping Co and renamed Great City. Operated under the management of Reardon Smith Line Ltd. Sold in 1964 to Taiship Co Ltd, Hong Kong and renamed Shipwind. Sold in 1968 to Southern Shipping & Enterprises Co Ltd, Hong Kong and renamed Wing Kwong. Sold in 1970 to Poon Shun Po, Hong Kong and reflagged to Somalia. Scrapped in June 1975 in Shanghai.

=== Empire Taw ===
Empire Taw was a 1,499 GRT cargo ship built by Hawthorns & Co, Leith. Completed in 1921 as London for Dundee, Perth and London Shipping Co Ltd. Requisitioned in 1942 by MoWT and transferred to the Admiralty. To Royal Navy as HMS Holdfast. Converted to an auxiliary cable and pipelaying vessel for use in Operation Pluto. To MoWT in 1946 and renamed Empire Taw. Scrapped in 1952 in Cork.

=== Empire Teak ===
Empire Teak was a 244 GRT tug built by Henry Scarr Ltd, Hessle. Launched on 21 December 1941 and completed in April 1942. Sold in 1950 to Alexandra Towing Co Ltd and renamed Brambles. Sold in 1969 to Northern Slipway Ltd, Dublin. Scrapped in October 1961 at Briton Ferry, West Glamorgan.

=== Empire Tedassa ===
Empire Tedassa was a 950 GRT coastal tanker built by Sir J Laing & Sons Ltd, Sunderland. Launched on 8 September 1945 and completed in December 1945. Sold in 1947 to Anglo-Saxon Petroleum Co Ltd and renamed Fossarina. Sold in 1950 to F T Everard & Sons Ltd and renamed Amity. Scrapped in 1965 at Great Yarmouth, Norfolk.

=== Empire Tedburgh ===
Empire Tedburgh was a 950 GRT coastal tanker built by Short Brothers Ltd, Sunderland. Launched on 4 February 1946 and completed in June 1946 as Dovedale H for J Harker (Coasters) Ltd. Sold in 1953 to Shell Mex & BP Ltd and renamed BP Supervisor. Sold in 1966 to Antonia Shipping co Ltd and renamed Rainbow. Operated under the management of J Livanos & Sons, Greece. Sold in 1967 to Ionian Tank Shipping SA and renamed Piraeus II. Operated under the management of G Kalogeratos & Co, Greece. Caught fire on 6 November 1977 and sank in Elusis Bay, Greece. Raised, then scrapped in September 1978 at Piraeus.

=== Empire Tedellen ===
Empire Tedellen was to have been an 890 GRT coastal tanker built by A & J Inglis Ltd, Glasgow but the contract for building her was cancelled.

=== Empire Tedfay ===
Empire Tedfay was to have been an 890 GRT coastal tanker built by A & J Inglis Ltd, Glasgow but the contract for building her was cancelled.

=== Empire Tedflora ===
Empire Tedflora was to have been an 890 GRT coastal tanker built by A & J Inglis Ltd, Glasgow but the contract for building her was cancelled.

=== Empire Tedilla ===
Empire Tedilla was a 950 GRT coastal tanker built by Sir J. Laing & Sons Ltd., Sunderland. Launched on 25 September 1945 and completed in February 1946. Sold in 1947 to Anglo-Saxon Petroleum Co. Ltd. and renamed Forskalia. Sold in 1949 to J Harker (Coasters) Ltd., and renamed Danesdale H. Sold in 1952 to Shell Mex & BP Ltd., renamed Shell Driller. Scrapped at Faslane in 1966.

=== Empire Tedlake ===
Empire Tedlake was to have been an 890 GRT coastal tanker built by A & J Inglis Ltd, Glasgow but the contract for building her was cancelled.

=== Empire Tedlora ===
Empire Tedlora was a 950 GRT coastal tanker built by Short Brothers td., Sunderland. Launched on 18 January 1946 and completed in June 1946. Sold in 1947 to Anglo-Saxon Petroleum Co. Ltd. and renamed Forreria. Sold in 1951 to F. T. Everard & Sons Ltd. and renamed Austility. Sold in 1969 to Ionian Tank Shipping S.A. and renamed Pireus IV. Sold in 1971 to G. Lyberis, Greece and renamed Asporpyrgos. Converted to a dumb barge at Perama in 1985.

=== Empire Tedmont ===
Empire Tedmont was to have been an 890 GRT coastal tanker built by A & J Inglis Ltd, Glasgow but the contract for building her was cancelled.

=== Empire Tedmuir ===
Empire Tedmuir was a 950 GRT coastal tanker built by A & J Inglis Ltd, Glasgow. Launched on 5 February 1946 and completed in May 1946. Sold in 1947 to Anglo-Saxon Petroleum Co Ltd and renamed Fusinus. Sold in 1949 to F T Everard & Sons Ltd and renamed Aqueity. Collision with Cutty Sark on 30 January 1952. Arrived in January 1965 at Bruges, Belgium for scrapping.

=== Empire Tedport ===
Empire Tedport was an 890 GRT coastal tanker built by A & J Inglis Ltd, Glasgow. Launched on 30 November 1945 and completed in March 1946. Sold in 1947 to Anglo-Saxon Petroleum Co Ltd and renamed Felipes. Sold in 1948 to Shell-Mex & BP Ltd and renamed Shelbrit 10. Renamed Shell Director in 1952. Scrapped in September 1966 at Bo'ness, West Lothian.

=== Empire Tedrita ===
Empire Tedrita was an 890 GRT coastal tanker built by A & J Inglis Ltd, Glasgow. Launched in April 1946 and completed in September 1946. Sold in 1947 to Anglo-Saxon Petroleum Co Ltd and renamed Fusus. Sold in 1956 to Kie Hock Shipping Co, Singapore. Rebuilt in 1957 and converted to take dry cargo. Sold in 1962 to Palembang Shipping Co, Panama. Operated under the management of Kie Hock Shipping Co, Singapore. Sold in 1964 to Compagnia de Navigazione Gatun, Panama and renamed Monaco, remaining under Kie Hock's management. Sold in 1965 to Compagnia Navigazione Thompson SA, Panama, and renamed Hanna, still under Kie Hock's management. Renamed Fataki later that year. Scrapped in July 1965 in Hong Kong.

=== Empire Tedrose ===
Empire Tedrose was to have been an 890 GRT coastal tanker built by A & J Inglis Ltd, Glasgow but the contract for building her was cancelled.

=== Empire Tedship ===
Empire Tedship was an 890 GRT coastal tanker built by A & J Inglis Ltd, Glasgow. Launched on 20 October 1945 and completed in February 1946. Sold in 1947 to Anglo-Saxon Petroleum Co Ltd and renamed Fischeria. Sold in 1951 to F T Everard & Sons Ltd and renamed Acuity. Sold in 1967 to Betamar Carriers Ltd, Somalia and renamed Vittoriosa. Converted in 1968 to a water carrier. Sold in 1969 to Compania di Davide Russo & Co, Italy and renamed Neptunia. Scrapped in 1975 in Italy.

=== Empire Tedson ===
Empire Tedson was a 950 GRT coastal tanker built by Grangemouth Dockyard Co Ltd, Grangemouth. Launched on 17 January 1946 and completed in July 1946 as Arduity for F T Everard & Sons Ltd. Lengthened in 1956, (1,159 GRT). Sold in 1969 to Felisberto Valente de Almeida, Portugal and renamed Bela. Renamed Ariex in 1970, relegated to river work only. Removed from shipping registers in 1979.

=== Empire Tees ===
Empire Tees was a 3,101 GRT cargo ship built in 1920 as Daybeam by J. Blumer & Co. Ltd., Sunderland. Sold to F Sainzde Inchaustegui, Spain in 1929 and renamed Sebastian. Sold in 1933 to Marques de Real Sorocco, Spain and renamed Azteca. Reported name change to Itxas-Alde in 1936 but deleted from shipping register. Sold to Compagnia Comerciale de Transportes S.A., Spain in 1941, named Sebastian. Seized by Royal Navy on 30 October 1943 and taken to Gibraltar. To MoWT in November 1943 and renamed Empire Tees in 1944. Sold to Compagnia Maritime Tees, Panama in 1950 and renamed Tees. Sold to Shamrock Shipping Co., Belfast in 1951, renamed Clonlee. Sold to Muzaffer Taviloglu, Turkey in 1954 and renamed Selamet. Arrived at Istanbul for breaking on 4 April 1968.

=== Empire Tegaden ===
Empire Tegaden was a 2,570 GRT tanker built by Howaldtswerke-Deutsche Werft, Kiel. Launched in 1940 as Jeverland, towed to Copenhagen for completion by Burmeister & Wain. Requisitioned by the Kriegsmarine on completion. Seized in May 1945 at Bergen, Norway. To MoWT and renamed Empire Tegaden. Allocated in 1946 to USSR and renamed Jeverland. Listed in shipping registers until 1958.

=== Empire Tegados ===
Empire Tegados was a 692 GRT coastal tanker built by F Schichau GmbH, Elbing. Completed in December 1937 as Gabelsflach for the Kriegsmarine. Seized in May 1945 at Kiel. To MoWT and renamed Empire Tegados. Allocated in 1946 to USSR and renamed Alexi Tolstoi. Scrapped in Baku in 1964.

=== Empire Tegaica ===
Empire Tegaica was the intended name of a 650 GRT coastal tanker built by Gutehoffnungschutte AG, Walsum. Completed in 1943 as Binz for the Kriegsmarine. Seized in May 1945 at Kiel. To MoWT, intended to be renamed Empire Tegaica but allocated in 1946 to USSR and renamed Kapitan Plaushevski. Deleted from shipping registers in 1970.

=== Empire Tegalta ===
Empire Tegalta was a 2,299 GRT tanker built by Nordseewerke, Emden. Completed in 1944 as Poseidon. Seized in May 1945 at Kiel. To MoWT and renamed Empire Tegalta. Allocated in 1946 to USSR and renamed Ararat. Scrapped in 1964.

=== Empire Tegamas ===
Empire Tegamas was a 708 GRT coastal tanker built by Schichau GmbH, Danzig. Completed in 1939 as Oderbank for the Kriegsmarine. Seized in May 1945 at Trondheim, Norway. To MoWT in 1946 and renamed Empire Tegamas. Allocated to USSR that year and renamed Khersones. Sunk in 1965 as a target in the Black Sea.

=== Empire Tegambia ===
Empire Tegambia was a 1,156 GRT tanker built by Lübecker Flenderwerke, Lübeck. Completed in 1936 as Hermann Andersen for C Andersen, Hamburg. Seized in May 1945 at Narvik, Norway. To MoWT in 1946 and renamed Empire Tegambia. Sold in 1947 to Bulk Oil Steamship Co Ltd and renamed Pass of Brander. Scrapped in 1956 at Dunston-on-Tyne.

=== Empire Tegaya ===
Empire Tegaya was a 3,145 GRT tanker built by Deutsche Werft, Hamburg. Completed in 1921 as Julius Schindler. Sold in 1939 to Hamburger Tank Reederei, Hamburg and renamed Thalatta. Requisitioned by the Kriegsmarine in 1940. Seized in May 1945 at Kiel, to MoWT and renamed Empire Tegaya. Sold in 1947 to Valiant Steamship Co Ltd and renamed Artist. Operated under the management of Vergottis Ltd, London. Sold in 1949 to Fundador Compagnia Navigazione, Panama and renamed Astro. Sold in 1953 to Nolido Compagnia de Navigazione, Panama and renamed Franco. Scrapped in 1960 at Savona, Italy.

=== Empire Tegenya ===
Empire Tegenya was a 1,172 GRT tanker built by Deutsche Werft, Hamburg. Completed in 1930 as Elsa Essberger for J T Essberger, Hamburg. Renamed Lisa Essberger in 1938. Requisitioned in 1940 by the Kriegsmarine. Seized in May 1945 at Copenhagen, to MoWT and renamed Empire Tegenya. Returned to J T Essberger in 1947 and renamed Lisa Essberger. Sold in 1960 to R C Eckelmann, Hamburg and renamed Olstauer. Sold in 1964 to C Diamantis, Greece and renamed Attiki. Suffered an engine room fire on 21 September 1967 in the Bay of Eleusis. Declared a constructive total loss but repaired and sold in 1968 to Greek Tanker Shipping Co Ltd and renamed Pelponnisis. Scrapped in October 1979 at Kynossoura, Greece.

=== Empire Tegidad ===
Empire Tegidad was a 642 GRT coastal tanker built by Deutsche Werk, Kiel. Completed in 1934 as Sylt for Carl W Hansen Tankschiffs, Hamburg. Requisitioned in 1940 by the Kriegsmarine. Seized in May 1945 at Trondheim, Norway. To MoWT and renamed Empire Tegidad. Returned to Carl W Hansen in 1946 and renamed Sylt. Sold in 1969 to Compagnia de Navigazione Lomamar SA, Panama and renamed Rovensca. Scrapped in April 1982 in Trieste, Italy.

=== Empire Tegleone ===
Empire Tegleone was a 782 GRT coastal tanker built by Sarpsborg Mekaniske Verksted, Sarpsborg, Norway. Completed in 1942 as Marsteinen for German owners but requisitioned by the Kriegsmarine. Seized in May 1945 at Copenhagen (by HMS Solebay), to MoWT and renamed Empire Tegleone. Allocated in 1946 to USSR but retained by the United Kingdom and laid up a Queenborough, Kent. Sold in 1953 to Leth & Co, Hamburg and renamed Otto. Sold in 1967 to N J Vardinoyannis, Greece and renamed Kali Limenes II. Sold in 1980 to Seka SA, Greece. Sold in 1984 to Sekavin Shipping Co, Greece.

=== Empire Tegoria ===
Empire Tegoria was a 1,863 GRT tanker built by Howaldtswerke, Kiel. Completed in 1916 as Usedom. Sold in 1937 to J T Essberger, Hamburg and renamed Inga Essberger. Requisitioned in 1940 by the Kriegsmarine. Seized in May 1945 at Sarpsborg, Norway. To MoWT and renamed Empire Tegoria. Allocated in 1946 to USSR and renamed Beshtau. Scrapped in 1970 in USSR.

=== Empire Teguda ===
Empire Teguda was a 670 GRT coastal tanker built by Danziger Werft AG, Danzig. Completed in 1938 as Amrum for the Kriegsmarine. Seized in May 1945 at Kiel. To MoWT and renamed Empire Teguda. Allocated to USSR in 1946 and renamed Nargin. Renamed Ahmedli in 1990. Deleted from shipping registers in 2002.

=== Empire Teguto ===
Empire Teguto was a 1,338 GRT tanker built by Howaldtswerke, Kiel. Completed in 1915 as Brosen for the German Government and placed under the management of J T Essberger, Hamburg. Surrendered in May 1945 at Pasajes, Spain. To MoWT and renamed Empire Teguto. Allocated in 1946 to USSR and renamed Ruslan. Transferred in 1950 to the Soviet Navy. Name deleted from shipping registers in 1960.

=== Empire Tegyika ===
Empire Tegyika was a 1,623 GRT tanker built by HC Stülcken Sohn, Hamburg. Completed in 1935 as Liselotte Essberger for J T Essberger, Hamburg. Requisitioned in 1940 by the Kriegsmarine. Seized in May 1945 at Trondheim, Norway. To MoWT and renamed Empire Tegyika. To the Admiralty in 1947 and renamed Thornol. Sold in 1948 to Metcalfe Motor Coasters Ltd and renamed Caroline M. A new diesel engine was fitted in 1958. Sold in 1966 to C Diamantis, Greece and renamed Kyllini. Scrapped in December 1980 at Salamis Island, Greece.

=== Empire Teme ===
Empire Teme was a 3,243 GRT cargo ship built by Nordseewerke, Emden. Completed in 1923 as Ilona Siemers for G J H Siemers & Co, Hamburg. Seized in May 1945 at Lübeck, to MoWT and renamed Empire Teme. Allocated in 1946 to USSR and renamed Aivazovsky. Deleted from shipping registers in 1970.

=== Empire Tenbrook ===
Empire Tenbrook was a 2,864 GRT tanker built by Uraga Dock Company, Uraga, Japan. Completed in 1944 as Ayakumo Maru. Seized in prize in 1947, to MoWT in 1947 and renamed Empire Tenbrook. Sold in 1950 to the Indonesian government and renamed Aer Mas. Scrapped in 1952 in Hong Kong.

=== Empire Tenby ===
Empire Tenby was an 852 GRT tanker built by Mitsubishi Shipyard, Shimonoseki, Japan. Launched on 30 October 1943 and completed on 20 January 1944 as Hishi Maru No 3 for Mitsubishi Kisen KK. Seized in 1945 as a war prize. To MoWT in 1945 and renamed MTS No 7. To Ministry of Supply in 1947, converted to a cargo ship and renamed Empire Tenby. Sold in 1949 to Gwee Au Nua, Singapore and renamed Leong Bee. Sold in 1952 to Tan Seck Kay, Singapore and renamed Philip Q. Sold in 1954 to Kie Hock Shipping Co, Singapore and renamed Tong Thay. Renamed Hammer in 1962 and reflagged to Panama. Renamed Fajado in 1965. Scrapped in July 1976 in Hong Kong.

=== Empire Tennyson ===
Empire Tennyson was a 2,880 GRT cargo ship built by William Gray & Co Ltd, West Hartlepool. Launched on 19 January 1942 and completed in March 1942. Torpedoed on 1 October 1942 and sunk by U-175 south east of Trinidad (09°27′N 60°05′W).

=== Empire Terence ===
Empire Terence was a 307 GRT tug built by Scott & Sons Ltd, Bowling, West Dunbartonshire. Laid down as Empire Terence and launched on 16 September 1946 as Tanumand for Petroleum Steamship Co Ltd. Completed in November 1946. Sold in 1958 to BP Tanker Co Ltd. Sold in 1971 to M R Saradpour, Iran. Sold in 1973 to Marine Service Co, Iran and renamed Famshek.

=== Empire Tern (I) ===
Empire Tern was a 2,606 GRT cargo ship built by the American Shipbuilding Company, Wyandotte, Michigan. Completed in November 1919 as Lake Inglenook for the USSB. Sold in 1926 to Newtex Steamship Corp, New York. Renamed Texas Banker in 1932. To MoWT in 1940 and renamed Empire Tern. Sold in 1946 to Williamson & Co, Hong Kong. Renamed Inchmull in 1949. Sold in 1953 to Compagnia Sigma, Panama and renamed Sigma Star. Scrapped in October 1953 in Osaka, Japan.

=== Empire Tern (II) ===
Empire Tern was a 4,820 tons displacement LST (3) built by Canadian Vickers Ltd, Montreal. Completed in May 1945 as HMS LST 3504. Later renamed HMS Pursuer. To Ministry of Transport (MoT) in 1956 during the Suez Crisis. Converted to a ferry and renamed Empire Tern. Operated under the management of Atlantic Steam Navigation Co Ltd until 1961 when management passed to British-India Steam Navigation Co Ltd. Scrapped in Singapore in September 1968.

=== Empire Tesbury ===
Empire Tesbury was a 975 GRT coastal tanker built by Bartram & Sons Ltd, Sunderland. Launched on 21 November 1945 and completed in March 1946. To the Admiralty in 1951, renamed Rippledyke and chartered out for commercial service. To Royal Fleet Auxiliary as RFA Rippledyke in 1958, used as an oil hulk at Gibraltar. Sold in 1960 to S Lucchese & L Esposito, Italy. Converted in 1961 to a suction dredger, now 1,000 GRT. Renamed Ada in 1965. Collided with Bočna and sank on 5 November 1966 at Lido, Venice. The wreck was struck on 16 November by motorboat Marini Di Sapri which sank as a result. Refloated on 4 February 1967, repaired and a new diesel engine fitted. Reclassed as a barge in 1978, scrapped in November 1981 at Porto Nogaro, Italy.

=== Empire Tescombe ===
Empire Tescombe was a 975 GRT coastal tanker built by Harland & Wolff Ltd, Glasgow. Launched on 4 October 1945 and completed in December 1945. Sold in 1952 to Anglo-Saxon Petroleum Co Ltd and renamed Fossarina. Scrapped in 1965 in Hong Kong.

=== Empire Tesdale ===
Empire Tesdale was a 975 GRT coastal tanker, built by Swan, Hunter & Wigham Richardson Ltd, Newcastle upon Tyne. Launched on 22 October 1945 and completed in May 1946. Sold in 1946 to Burmah Oil Co (Tankers) Ltd, Rangoon, Burma and renamed Beme. Operated under the management of Burmah Oil Co Ltd, London. To Burmah Oil Co (Burma Trading) Ltd in 1948. To The People's Oil Industry, Burma in 1963. To the Burmese Government in 1964 and renamed Yenan. Scrapped in 1980 in Burma.

=== Empire Tesdown ===
Empire Tesdown was to have been a 975 GRT coastal tanker built by Harland & Wolff Ltd, Glasgow but the contract for building her was cancelled.

=== Empire Tesella ===
Empire Tesella was a 975 GRT coastal tanker built by Harland & Wolff Ltd, Glasgow. Launched on 31 October 1945 and completed in February 1946. Sold in 1951 to the British Tanker Co Ltd and renamed British Pluck. Scrapped in April 1954 in Bombay.

=== Empire Tesgate ===
Empire Tesgate was to have been a 975 GRT coastal tanker built by Bartram & Sons Ltd, Sunderland but the contract for building her was cancelled.

=== Empire Tesgrove ===
Empire Tesgrove was to have been a 975 GRT coastal tanker built by Harland & Wolff Ltd, Glasgow but the contract for building her was cancelled.

=== Empire Tesland ===
Empire Tesland was a 975 GRT coastal tanker built by Harland & Wolff Ltd, Glasgow. Launched on 31 July 1945 and completed in September 1945. Sold in 1946 to Anglo-Saxon Petroleum Co Ltd and renamed Fulgar. Sold in 1948 to Shell-Mex & BP Ltd and renamed Shelbrit 9. Renamed BP Manager in 1952. Scrapped in June 1967 at Antwerp, Belgium.

=== Empire Teslin ===
Empire Teslin was a 975 GRT coastal tanker built by Swan, Hunter & Wigham Richardson Ltd, Newcastle upon Tyne. Launched on 5 October 1945 and completed in April 1946. Sold in 1946 to Anglo-Saxon Petroleum Co Ltd and rename Fragum. Sold in 1948 to Shell-Mex & BP Ltd and renamed Shelbrit 8. Renamed Shell Supplier in 1952. Lengthened in 1954, now 1,157 GRT. Sold in 1967 to Marine Water Supply Co Ltd, Greece and renamed Sofia. Operated under the management of N E Vernicos Shipping Co Ltd, Greece. Scrapped in May 1971 at Perama, Greece.

=== Empire Tesrock ===
Empire Tesrock was to have been a 975 GRT coastal tanker built by Bartram & Sons Ltd, Sunderland but the contract for building her was cancelled.

=== Empire Tessa ===
Empire Tessa was a 292 GRT tug built by William Simons & Co Ltd, Renfrew. Launched on 3 June 1946 and completed later that month. To the Admiralty in 1947 and renamed Eminent. Severely damaged by fire on 18 January 1951 at Bermuda. Towed to the UK and repaired. Sold in 1976 Maryport Maritime Museum, Maryport, Cumbria. Arrived on 26 February 1986 at Millom, Cumbria for scrapping.

=== Empire Test ===
Empire Test was an 8,298 GRT cargo liner built by J Cockerill SA, Hoboken, Belgium. Completed in 1922 as Thysville. To MoT in 1947 and renamed Empire Test. Scrapped in 1953 at Faslane, Argyllshire.

=== Empire Tesville ===
Empire Tesville was a 975 GRT coastal tanker built by Bartram & Sons Ltd, Sunderland. Launched on 21 November 1945 and completed in March 1946. Commanded in 1956 by Capt. T.G.W. Wormald of Shell Tankers. Sold in 1960 to Shell Tankers Ltd and renamed Fusinus. Sold in 1962 to Anglo-Saxon Petroleum Co Ltd. Scrapped in 1964 in Singapore.

=== Empire Teviot ===
Empire Teviot was a 5,337 GRT cargo ship built by Flensburger Schiffbau- Gesellschaft. Completed in 1937 as Mathias Stinnes for Kohlen-Import und Poseidon Schiffahrt, Königsberg. Seized in May 1945 at Copenhagen. To MoWT and renamed Empire Teviot. Allocated in 1946 to USSR and renamed Akademik Krilov. Scrapped in 1975 in the USSR.

== See also ==
The above entries give a precis of each ship's history. For a fuller account see the linked articles.

== Sources ==
- Mitchell, W H; Sawyer, L A (1990). The Empire Ships (Second ed.). London, New York, Hamburg, Hong Kong: Lloyd's of London Press Ltd. ISBN 1-85044-275-4.
