= Kaloi Limenes =

Kaloi Limenes Καλοί Λιμένες
- Settlement
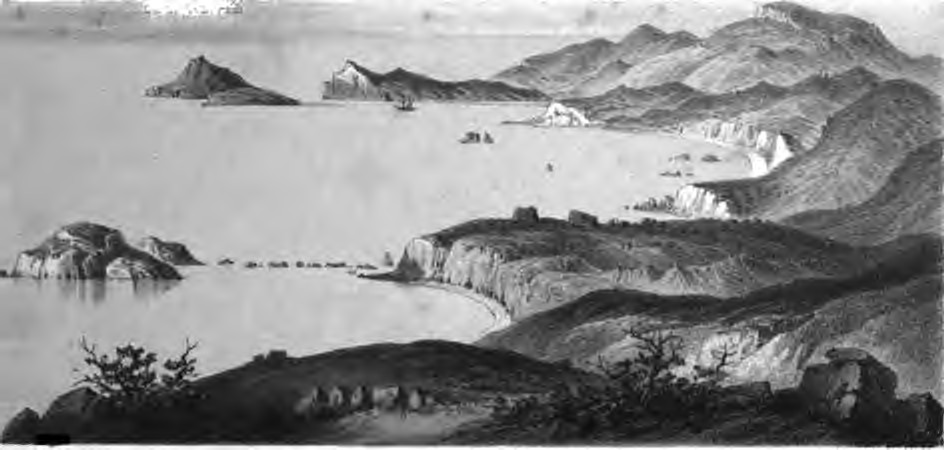
- Panorama of Kaloi Limenes, painted by Thomas Abel Brimage Spratt, from Travels and researches in Crete (1865)

- Location within Greece
- Coordinates: 34°55′46.9″N 24°48′01.1″E
- Country: Greece
- Administrative region: Crete
- Regional unit: Heraklion
- Municipality: Faistos
- Municipal unit: Moires
- Community: Pigaidakia

Population (2021)
  - Total: 17
- Time zone: UTC+2 (EET)
  - Summer (DST): UTC+3 (EEST)
- Postal code: 700 09
- Area code: 28920

Kaloi Limenes or Kali Limenes (Greek: Καλοί Λιμένες [kaliˈ liménes]) is a village and port in the Heraklion regional unit, southern Crete, in Greece, located 70km (43.5 miles) south-west of the city of Heraklion. It has 17 inhabitants (2021). It is known as a major bunkering spot for ships in the southern Mediterranean.

== History ==
Kaloi Limenes (meaning 'good harbors' or 'fair havens') is a natural port near the southernmost point of Crete. It is close to the village of Lentas (ancient Levin), and the unexcavated remains of Lassea, a port for the ancient settlement of Gortys.

According to the Acts of the Apostles, Apostle Paul, landed at Kaloi Limenes on his way from Caesarea to Rome as a prisoner of the Romans, then attempted to proceed further west along the coast to Phoinikas ("Phoenix"), a small village in the bay west of Loutro, or to Loutro itself. A small church, named after the apostle, was built in Kaloi Limenes in Byzantine times, then restored in the 1960s.

== Bunkering ==
The port is the home of a bunkering facility, located on the small island of Aghios Pavlos (Saint Paul) at its entrance. The facility has four shore-based storage tanks containing fuel oil and gasoil, pumps of 1,000 cubic meters per hour capacity and three loading docks. The terminal's maximum draft of 40 feet (13.45 metres) enables the facility to handle oil tankers of up to approximately two hundred thousand metric tons of deadweight.

== See also ==
- Matala, Crete
- Libyan Sea
- Historical reliability of the Acts of the Apostles
