= Faistos =

Faistos Φαιστός
- Municipality
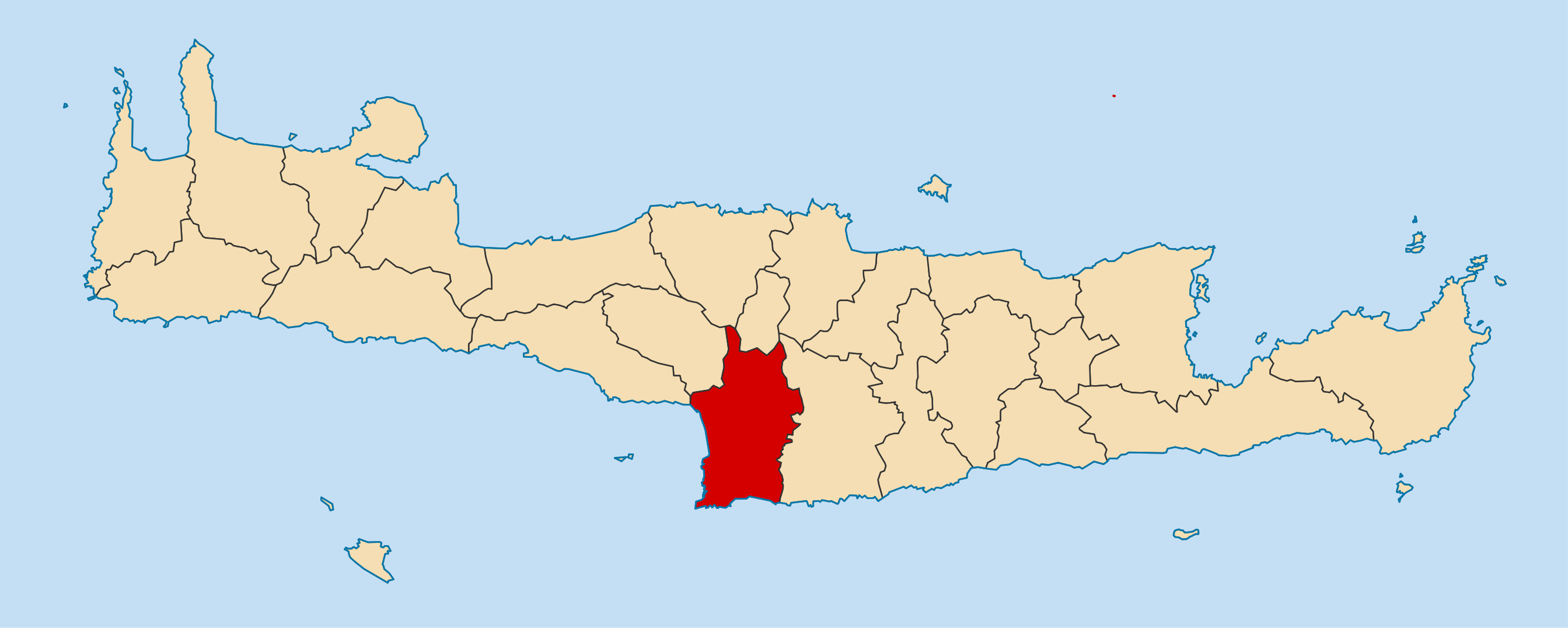

- Location within Greece
- Coordinates: 35°03′N 24°52′E
- Country: Greece
- Administrative region: Crete
- Regional unit: Heraklion
- Seat: Moires

Area
  - Municipality: 410.8 km^{2} (158.6 sq mi)

Population (2021)
  - Municipality: 23,921
  - Density: 58.23/km^{2} (150.8/sq mi)
- Time zone: UTC+2 (EET)
  - Summer (DST): UTC+3 (EEST)

Faistos (Greek: Φαιστός) is a municipality in Heraklion regional unit, Crete, Greece. The seat of the municipality is the village Moires. It is named after the ancient city Phaistos, located in the municipality. The municipality has an area of 410.810 km^{2} (158.615 sq mi).

== Municipality ==
The municipality Faistos was formed at the 2011 local government reform by the merger of the following 3 former municipalities, that became municipal units:

- Moires
- Tympaki
- Zaros

== Geography ==
The municipality includes Cape Lithinon, the southernmost point of Crete.

=== Climate ===
Climate data for Faistos, Greece
Month	Jan	Feb	Mar	Apr	May	Jun	Jul	Aug	Sep	Oct	Nov	Dec	Year
Mean daily maximum °F (°C)	59.0 (15.0)	59.1 (15.1)	61.7 (16.5)	68.0 (20.0)	74.1 (23.4)	80.8 (27.1)	83.3 (28.5)	82.8 (28.2)	79.5 (26.4)	74.1 (23.4)	67.3 (19.6)	61.9 (16.6)	71.0 (21.7)
Mean daily minimum °F (°C)	48.4 (9.1)	48.2 (9.0)	49.3 (9.6)	53.8 (12.1)	59.5 (15.3)	66.6 (19.2)	71.4 (21.9)	71.6 (22.0)	67.3 (19.6)	62.1 (16.7)	56.1 (13.4)	51.3 (10.7)	58.8 (14.9)
Source: <Yr.no >"Weather forecast for Phaistos". Weather statistics for Phaistos, Crete (Greece). Yr.no. 2016.
