= Pumpkin Center =

Pumpkin Center may refer to:

- Pumpkin Center, DeKalb County, Alabama, a place in Alabama
- Pumpkin Center, Morgan County, Alabama, a place in Alabama
- Pumpkin Center, California
- Pumpkin Center, Orange County, Indiana
- Pumpkin Center, Washington County, Indiana
- Pumpkin Center, Kentucky
- Pumpkin Center, Louisiana
- Pumpkin Center, Missouri (disambiguation)
  - Pumpkin Center, Dallas County, Missouri
  - Pumpkin Center, Nodaway County, Missouri
- Pumpkin Center, North Carolina
- Pumpkin Center, Oklahoma (disambiguation)
  - Pumpkin Center, Cherokee County, Oklahoma
  - Pumpkin Center, Comanche County, Oklahoma
  - Pumpkin Center, Muskogee County, Oklahoma
  - Pumpkin Center, Okmulgee County, Oklahoma

No information appears on the origins of the name; however, “Pumpkin Center” as a town name was widely publicized by one Cal Stewart, who was a popular spoken-word recording artist in the late 1890s and early 1900s. He frequently played the character of a gullible individual by the name of Uncle Josh Weathersby who hailed from the fictional town of "Pumpkin Center" or "Punkin Center". The recordings described life in Pumpkin Center, as well as the character's collisions with modernity in New York City. Perhaps as a result, there are at least 31 communities in the U.S. named Pumpkin Center scattered across 16 states, including Alabama (3), Arizona (2), California (2), Florida, Georgia, Indiana (2), Kentucky, Louisiana, Maryland, Missouri (2), Mississippi, North Carolina (3), Oklahoma (4), South Dakota, Tennessee (3) and Virginia (2).

== See also ==
- Punkin Center (disambiguation)
