= Pumpkin Center, Oklahoma =

Pumpkin Center, Oklahoma may refer to one of these small communities in Oklahoma:

- Pumpkin Center, Cherokee County, Oklahoma
- Pumpkin Center, Comanche County, Oklahoma
- Pumpkin Center, Muskogee County, Oklahoma
- Pumpkin Center, Okmulgee County, Oklahoma

== See also ==
- Pumpkin Center (disambiguation)
