= Grammy Award for Best Historical Album =

American recorded music award

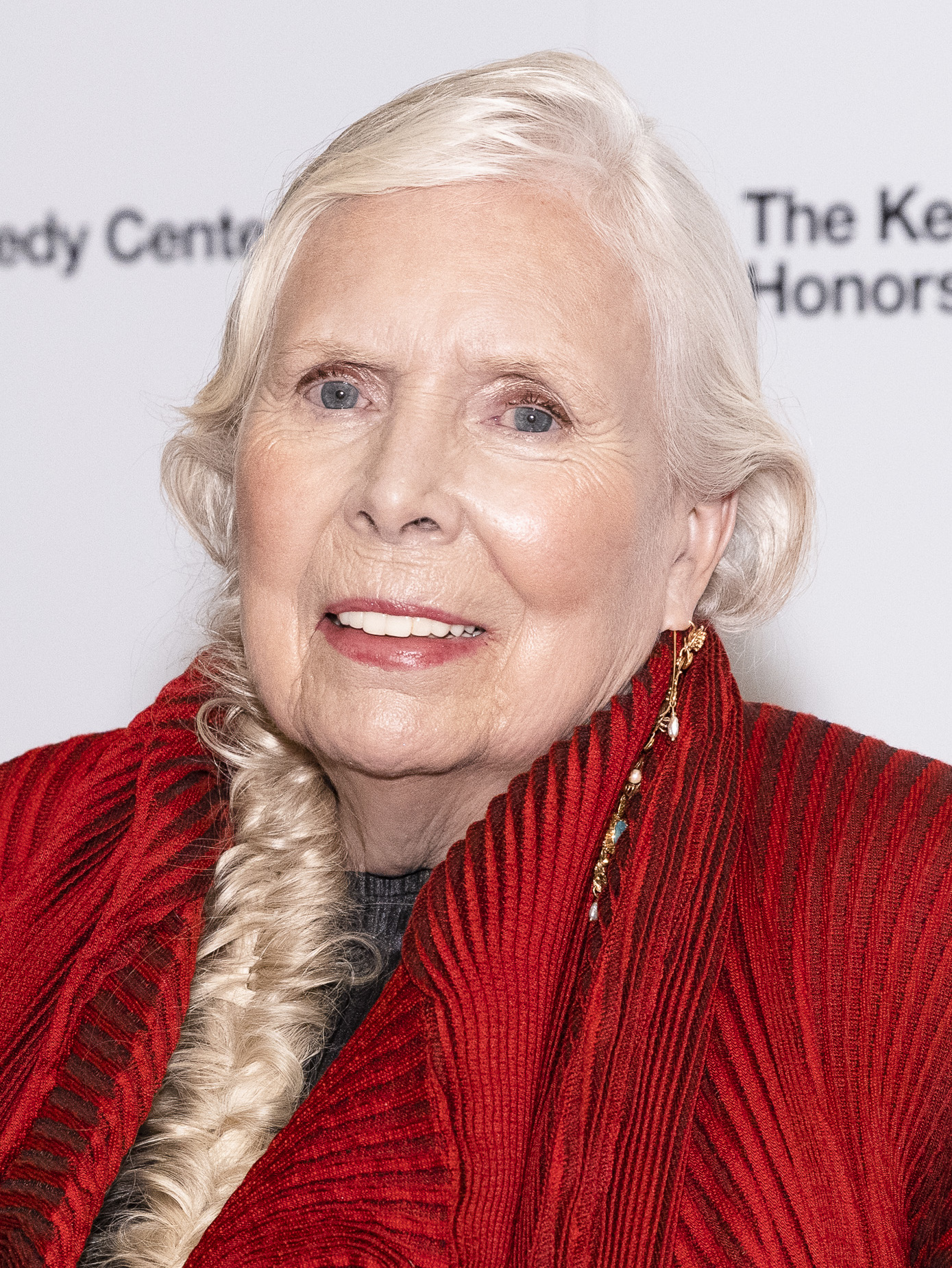
- Joni Mitchell Archives – Vol. 4: The Asylum Years (1976–1980) by Joni Mitchell is the most recent recipient
- Awarded for: quality historical albums
- Country: United States
- Presented by: National Academy of Recording Arts and Sciences
- First award: 1979
- Currently held by: Joni Mitchell Archives – Vol. 4: The Asylum Years (1976–1980) - Patrick Milligan & Joni Mitchell, compilation producers; Bernie Grundman, mastering engineer (Joni Mitchell) (Rhino) (2026)
- Website: grammy.com

The Grammy Award for Best Historical Album has been presented since 1979 and recognizes achievements in audio restoration. Since this category's creation, the award had several minor name changes:

- In 1979 the award was known as Best Historical Repackage Album
- In 1980 it was awarded as Best Historical Reissue
- In 1981 it was awarded as Best Historical Reissue Album
- From 1982 to the present it has been awarded as Best Historical Album

Years reflect the year in which the Grammy Awards were presented, for works released in the previous year. The award is presented to individuals responsible for compiling and engineering the winning album. The roles of these individuals have changed over time:

- From 1979 to 1993 the award was given to the Producer(s)
- From 1994 to 1995 it was awarded to the Compilation Producer(s)
- In 1996 it was awarded to the Art Director, Compilation Producer, Mastering Engineers, and/or Album Notes Writers
- From 1997 to 2018 it was awarded to the Compilation Producer(s) and/or Mastering Engineer(s)
- Since 2019 it has been awarded to the Compilation Producer(s), Mastering Engineer(s) and/or Restoration Engineer(s).

The award does not go to the artists, unless an artist is also a compilation producer and/or mastering engineer.

== Winners and nominees ==
Year^{[I]}	Recipients(s)	Work	Performing artist(s)	Nominees Performers are in parentheses	Ref.
1979	Michael Brooks (producer)	The Lester Young Story, Vol. 3 · Columbia	Lester Young	A Bing Crosby Collection, Vols. I & II – Michael Brooks, producer (Bing Crosby) (Columbia); The First Recorded Sounds 1888 to 1929 – George Garabedian, producer (Various Artists) (Mark 56); The Greatest Group of Them All – Bob Porter, producer (The Ravens) (Savoy); La Divina – Peter Andry & Walter Legge, producers (Maria Callas) (Angel)	
1980	Jerry Korn & Michael Brooks (producers)	Billie Holiday (Giants of Jazz) · Time/Life	Billie Holiday	One Never Knows, Do One? The Best of Fats Waller – George Spitzer & Chick Crumpacker, producers (Fats Waller) (Book of the Month); Duke Ellington (Giants of Jazz). Jerry Korn & Michael Brooks, producers (Duke Ellington) (Time/Life); The Magical Music of Walt Disney – Dick Schory, producer (Various Artists) (Ovation); A Tribute to E. Power Biggs – Andrew Kazdin, producer (E. Power Biggs et al.) (Columbia)	
1981	Keith Hardwick (producer)	Segovia – The EMI Recordings 1927–39 · Angel	Andrés Segovia	Early History of the Phonograph Record with Thomas Alva Edison – George Garabedian, producer (Various Artists) (Mark 56); First Edition/The Golden Age of Broadway – C. E. Crumpacker, producer (Various Artists) (RCA Special Products); The Guitarists (Giants of Jazz) – Jerry Korn & Michael Brooks, producers (Various Artists) (Time/Life); Songs of the Depression: Happy Days Are Here Again – George Spitzer & Michael Brooks, producers (Various Artists) (Book of the Month)	
1982	Michael Brooks & George Spitzer (producers)	Hoagy Carmichael – From Stardust to Ole Buttermilk Sky · Book of the Month	Hoagy Carmichael	The Smithsonian Collection of Classic Country Music – Bill C. Malone, producers (Various Artists) (Smithsonian Collection); Birmingham Quartet Anthology – Doug Seroff, producer (Various Artists) (Clanka Lanka); Chronicle, The Complete Prestige Recordings – Orrin Keepnews, producer (Miles Davis) (Prestige); The Quintet of the Hot Club of France (1936-1937) – Kevin Yatarola, producer (Django Reinhardt, Stephane Grappelli) (Inner City Records)	
1983	Alan Dell, Ethel Gabriel & Don Wardell (album producers)	The Tommy Dorsey/Frank Sinatra Sessions Vols. 1, 2, 3 · RCA	Tommy Dorsey and Frank Sinatra	An Experiment in Modern Music: Paul Whiteman at Aeolian Hall – Martin Williams & J.R. Taylor, album producers (Paul Whiteman) (Smithsonian Collection); Bartok at the Piano, 1920–1945 – Dora Antal, album producer (Béla Bartok) (Hungaroton); Bunny Berigan (Giants of Jazz) – Michael Brooks, album producer (Bunny Berigan) (Time/Life); Minstrels & Tunesmiths: The Commercial Roots of Early Country Music – Norm Cohen, album producer (Various Artists) (John Edwards Memorial Foundation)	
1984	Stanley Walker & Allan Steckler (album producers)	The Greatest Recordings of Arturo Toscanini – Symphonies, Vol. I · Franklin Mint Record Society	Arturo Toscanini	Back in the Saddle Again: American Cowboy Songs – Charlie Seemann, album producer (Various Country and Western Artists) (New World); The Complete Blue Note Recordings of Thelonious Monk – Michael Cuscuna, album producer (Thelonious Monk) (Mosaic); Kings of New Orleans Jazz – Stanley Walker & Dan Morgenstern, album producers (Jelly Roll Morton, King Oliver, Sidney Bechet) (Franklin Mint Record Society); The Motown Story: The First 25 Years – Jon Badeaux, album producer (Various Artists) (Motown)	
1985	J. R. Taylor (album producer)	Big Band Jazz · Smithsonian	Various Artists (Note: Various Artists include Paul Whiteman, Fletcher Henderson, Chick Webb, Tommy Dorsey, Count Basie, Benny Goodman, etc.)	Cotton Club Stars – Bernard Brightman, album producer (Cab Calloway, Jimmie Lunceford, Ethel Waters & others) (Stash); A Golden Celebration – Gregg Geller & Joan Deary, album producers (Elvis Presley) (RCA); History Speaks: Franklin Delano Roosevelt – George Spitzer & Pat Sweeting, album producers (Franklin Delano Roosevelt—Introduction by Clifton Fadiman) (Book of the Month); World's First Entertainment Recordings 1889–1896 – George Garabedian, album producer (Silas Leachman, Len Spencer, George W. Johnson, Dan W. Quinn & others) (Mark 56)	
1986	John Pfeiffer (album producer)	RCA/Met—100 Singers—100 Years · RCA Red Seal	Various Artists (Note: Various Artists include From Melba, Schumann-Heink, Caruso through Price, Verrett, Domingo & 94 others)	American Popular Song – J. R. Taylor, album producer (Fred Astaire, Lena Horne, Nat "King" Cole, Sarah Vaughan & others) (Smithsonian/CBS Special Products); Bill Evans: The Complete Riverside Recordings – Orrin Keepnews, album producer (Bill Evans) (Riverside); Billie Holiday on Verve 1946–1959 – Tohru Okamura, album producer (Billie Holiday) (Verve); The Human Orchestra (Rhythm Quartets in the Thirties) – Doug Seroff, album producer (Mills Brothers, Ink Spots, Four Blackbirds & others) (Clanka Lanka)	
1987	Bob Porter & Aziz Goksel (album producers)	Atlantic Rhythm and Blues 1947–1974, Vols. 1–7 · Atlantic	Various Artists (Note: Various Artists include Brook Benton, Ray Charles, The Coasters, The Drifters, Roberta Flack, Aretha Franklin, Otis Redding, & many others)	Biograph – Jeff Rosen, album producer (Bob Dylan) (Columbia/CBS); The Complete Keynote Collection – Kiyoshi Koyama, album producer (334 Jazz Performances of the '40s) (Keynote); The Mapleson Cylinders – David Hamilton & Tom Owen, album producers (Various Metropolitan Opera Artists) (Rodgers and Hammerstein Archives); The Voice, The Columbia Years 1943–1952 – Joe McEwen & James Isaacs, album producers (Frank Sinatra) (Columbia/CBS)	
1988	Orrin Keepnews (album producer)	Thelonious Monk: The Complete Riverside Recordings · Riverside	Thelonious Monk	The Bristol Sessions – Bob Pinson & Kyle Young, album producers (The Carter Family, Jimmie Rodgers & others) (Country Music Foundation); The Gershwin Collection – Paul Tannen, album producer (Ella Fitzgerald, Johnny Mathis, Andy Williams & others) (Teledisc USA); The Otis Redding Story – Kim Cooke, Bob Porter & Rob Bowman, album producers (Otis Redding) (Atlantic); Singers and Soloists of the Swing Bands – Margaret Robinson, album producer (Louis Armstrong, Benny Goodman, Frank Sinatra & others) (Smithsonian)	
1989	Bill Levenson (album producer)	Crossroads · PolyGram	Eric Clapton	The Classic Hoagy Carmichael – John Edward Hasse, album producer (Hoagy Carmichael & others) (Indiana Historical Society); The Complete Commodore Jazz Recordings, Vol. I – Michael Cuscuna, album producer (Various Artists) (Mosaic); Djangologie/USA – Hugh Fordin, album producer (Django Reinhardt) (Disques Swing); The Erteguns' New York—New York Cabaret Music – Bob Porter, album producer (Various Artists) (Atlantic)	
1990	Andy McKaie (album producer)	The Chess Box · Chess/MCA	Chuck Berry	American Musical Theater—Shows, Songs and Stars – Dwight Blocker Bowers & Margaret Robinson, album producers (Various Artists) (Smithsonian); Blue Note 50th Anniversary Collection, Volumes 1–5: 1939–1989 – Michael Cuscuna, album producer (Various Jazz Artists) (Blue Note); Jazz Piano – Martin Williams, album producer (Various Artists 1898–1964) (Smithsonian); Nat King Cole and the King Cole Trio – Will Friedwald, album producer (Nat King Cole and The King Cole Trio) (Savoy Jazz)	
1991	Lawrence Cohn & Stephen Lavere (album producers)	Robert Johnson: The Complete Recordings · Columbia/CBS	Robert Johnson	Beethoven: Symphonies 1–9 & Leonore Overture No. 3 – John Pfeiffer, album producer (Arturo Toscanini and NBC Symphony Orchestra) (RCA Gold Seal); Brownie: The Complete Emarcy Recordings of Clifford Brown – Kiyoshi Koyama, album producer (Clifford Brown) (Emarcy); The Jack Kerouac Collection – James Austin, album producer (Jack Kerouac) (Rhino); Verdi: Aida, Falstaff, Requiem, Te Deum, Va, Pensiero, Hymn of the Nations – John Pfeiffer, album producer (Arturo Toscanini and NBC Symphony Orchestra) (RCA Gold Seal)	
1992	Steven Lasker & Andy McKaie (album producers)	Billie Holiday, The Complete Decca Recordings · GRP	Billie Holiday	The Complete Caruso – John Pfeiffer, album producer (Enrico Caruso) (RCA Victor Gold Seal); The Complete Stax/Volt Singles 1959–1968 – Steve Greenberg, album producer (Various Artists) (Atlantic); The First 100 Years – Henry Fogel, album producer (Sir Georg Solti and Chicago Symphony Orchestra) (Chicago Symphony Orchestra); Igor Stravinsky: The Recorded Legacy – John McClure, album producer (Igor Stravinsky et al.) (Sony Classical)	
1993	Michael Cuscuna (album producer)	The Complete Capitol Recordings of The Nat "King" Cole Trio · Mosaic	Nat King Cole Trio	Les Paul: The Legend & The Legacy – Ron Furmanek, album producer (Les Paul) (Capitol); The King of Rock 'n' Roll: The Complete 50's Masters – Ernst Mikael Jorgenson & Roger Semon, album producers (Elvis Presley) (RCA); The Music of Disney: A Legacy in Song – Michael Leon, album producer (Various Artists) (Walt Disney); You're the Top: Cole Porter in the 1930s – Susan Elliott, Robert Kimball & Richard M. Sudhalter, album producers (Various Artists) (Koch Int'l Classics/Indiana Historical Society)	
1994	Michael Lang & Phil Schaap (compilation producers)	The Complete Billie Holiday on Verve 1945–1959 · Verve	Billie Holiday	Noel Coward: The Masters' Voice-His HMV Recordings 1928-1953 – Sheridan Morley, compilation producer (Noël Coward) (Angel); Bing - His Legendary Years 1931–1957 – Andy McKaie & Steven Lasker, compilation producers (Bing Crosby) (MCA); Frank Sinatra - The Columbia Years 1943–1952, The Complete Recordings – Didier C. Deutsch, compilation producer (Frank Sinatra) (Columbia/Legacy); The Monterey International Pop Festival – Stephen K. Peeples, Geoff Gans & Lou Adler, compilation producers (Various Artists) (Rhino)	
1995	Michael Lang (compilation producer)	The Complete Ella Fitzgerald Song Books on Verve · Verve	Ella Fitzgerald	Andres Segovia: A Centenary Celebration – Israel Horowitz, compilation producer (Andrés Segovia) (MCA Classics); The Complete Decca Masters (Plus) – Ron O'Brien, compilation producer (Judy Garland) (MCA); Louis Armstrong: Portrait of the Artist as a Young Man, 1923–1934 – Dan Morgenstern, Nedra Olds-Neal & Bruce Talbot, compilation producers (Louis Armstrong) (Columbia/Legacy/Smithsonian); The Song Is You – Paul Williams, compilation producer (Tommy Dorsey & Frank Sinatra) (RCA); Songs of the West – James Austin & Randy Poe, compilation producers (Various Artists) (Rhino)	
1996	J.J. Stelmach (art director); John Pfeiffer (compilation producers); Ray Hall, Thomas MacCluskey, James P. Nichols, Anthony Salvatore, Jon M. Samuels & David Satz (mastering engineers); Various (Note: Various album notes writers' include Gabriel Banat, Grant Beglarian, Robert Cowan, Mortimer W. Frank, Richard Freed, Erick Friedman, Harris Goldsmith, Josefa Heifetz, George Jellinek, Irving Kolodin, Jacob Lateiner, Laurence Lesser, Myra C. Livingston, John Maltese, John Anthony Maltese, Leonard Pennario, John Pfeiffer & Brooks Smith) (album notes writers)	The Heifetz Collection · RCA Victor Gold Seal	Jascha Heifetz & Various Artists	John Coltrane: The Heavyweight Champion: The Complete Atlantic Recordings – Geoff Gans, art director; Joel Dorn & Patrick Milligan, compilation producers; Gene Paul, mastering engineer; Joel Dorn, Tom Dowd, Jimmy Heath, Charles Lloyd & Lewis Porter, album notes writers (John Coltrane) (Rhino/Atlantic Jazz Gallery); Live at the BBC – Rick Ward, art director; George Martin, compilation producer; George Martin, mastering engineer; Kevin Howlett, album notes writer (The Beatles) (Capitol); The R&B Box: 30 Years of Rhythm & Blues – Rachel Gutek & Coco Shinomiya, art directors; James Austin, Ricard Foos & Billy Vera, compilation producers; Chris Clarke, Bob Fisher, Dan Hersch, Bill Inglot & Ken Perry, mastering engineers; Peter Grendysa & Billy Vera, album notes writers (Various Artists) (Rhino); Early Ellington: The Complete Brunswick and Vocalion Recordings of Duke Ellington, 1926–1931 – Hollis King, art director; Orrin Keepnews & Steven Lasker, compilation producers; Erick Larson, Steven Lasker & Seth B. Winner, mastering engineers; Steven Lasker, album notes writer (Duke Ellington and His Orchestra) (GRP)	
1997	Bob Belden & Phil Schaap (compilation producers); Phil Schaap & Mark Wilder (mastering engineers)	The Complete Columbia Studio Recordings · Columbia	Miles Davis & Gil Evans	The Mel Torme Collection 1944–1985 – Dave Kapp, compilation producer; Bob Fisher, Dan Hersch & Bill Inglot, mastering engineers (Mel Tormé) (Rhino); The Complete Reprise Studio Recordings – Gregg Geller, Lee Herschberg, Joe McEwen & Ric Ross, compilation producers; Lee Herschberg, mastering engineer (Frank Sinatra) (Reprise); Fritz Kreisler: The Complete RCA Recordings – John Pfeiffer, compilation producer; Harold Hogopian, Glen Kolotkin & Ward Marston, mastering engineers (Fritz Kreisler) (RCA Victor Gold Seal); The Mercury Blues 'N' Rhythm Story 1945–1955 – Jim Fishel & Barbara Lynn Micale, compilation producers; Suha Gur, mastering engineer (Various Artists) (Mercury)	
1998	Amy Horowitz, Jeff Place & Pete Reiniger (compilation producers); David Glasser & Charlie Pilzer(mastering engineers)	Anthology of American Folk Music (1997 Edition Expanded) · Smithsonian Folkways	Various Artists	Centenary Edition: 100 Years of Great Music – Tony Locantro, compilation producer; Andrew Walter, mastering engineer (Various Artists) (EMI Classics); The Complete Bill Evans on Verve – Michael Lang, compilation producer; Suha Gur, mastering engineer (Bill Evans) (Verve); Cuba: I Am Time – Jack O'Neil, Nina Gomes & Al Pryor, compilation producers; Gene Paul, mastering engineer (Various Artists) (Blue Jackel Entertainment); Ray Charles Genius & Soul: The 50th Anniversary Collection – James Austin, David Ritz & Billy Vera, compilation producers; Bob Fisher, Dan Hersch & Doug Sax, mastering engineers (Ray Charles) (Rhino); Sing, Cowboy, Sing! The Gene Autry Collection – James Austin, Karla Buhlman & Patrick Milligan, compilation producers; Bob Fisher, mastering engineer (Gene Autry) (Rhino)	
1999	Colin Escott, Kira Florita & Kyle Young (compilation producers); Joseph M. Palmaccio & Tom Ruff (mastering engineers)	The Complete Hank Williams · Mercury Nashville	Hank Williams	Have a Nice Decade: The '70s Pop Culture Box – Bill Inglot, David McLees & Gordon Skeene, compilation producers; Andrew Garver, Dan Hersh, Bill Inglot, Ken Perry & Stewart Whitmore, mastering engineers (Various Artists) (Rhino); The Jazz Singers: A Smithsonian Collection of Jazz Vocals from 1919 to 1994 – Robert G. O'Meally & Bruce Talbot, compilation producers; Todd Hulslander & John Tyler, mastering engineers (Various Artists) (Smithsonian); New York Philharmonic: The Historic Broadcasts 1923 to 1987 – Sedgwick Clark, compilation producer; Jon M. Samuels & Seth B. Winner, mastering engineers (New York Philharmonic) (New York Philharmonic Special Editions); The Pet Sounds Sessions – David Leaf, Mark Linett & Brian Wilson, compilation producers; Joe Gastwirt, mastering engineer (The Beach Boys) (Capitol/EMI)	
2000	Orrin Keepnews & Steven Lasker (compilation producers); Paul Brizzi, Dennis Ferrante & Steven Lasker (mastering engineers)	The Duke Ellington Centennial Edition: The Complete RCA Victor Recordings (1927–1973) · RCA Victor/BMG Classics	Duke Ellington	The Complete Jazz at the Philharmonic on Verve, 1944–1949 – Michael Lang, Phil Schaap & Ben Young, compilation producers; Phil Schaap, mastering engineer (Various Artists) (Verve); The Mahler Broadcasts, 1948–1982 – Sedgwick Clark, compilation producer; Jon M. Samuels & Seth B. Winner, mastering engineers (New York Philharmonic) (New York Philharmonic Special Editions); Ray Charles: The Complete Country & Western Recordings (1959–1986) – James Austin, Ray Charles, Terry Howard & Michael Johnson, compilation producers; Terry Howard & Doug Sax, mastering engineers (Ray Charles) (Rhino); Sony Music 100 Years: Soundtrack for a Century – Billy Altman, Steve Berkowitz, Mike Berniker, Michael Brooks, Mitchell Cohen, Lawrence Cohn, Didier C. Deutsch, Bruce Dickinson, Michelle Errante, Jeff Jones, Arthur Levy, Nedra Olds-Neal, Al Quaglieri, Leo Sacks, Phil Schaap, Tom Vickers & Warren Wernick, compilation producers; Chris Athens, Matt Cavaluzzo, Harry Coster, Ellen Fitton, Seth Foster, Andreas Meyer, Joseph M. Palmaccio, Darcy Proper, Ken Robertson, Tom "Curly" Ruff, Phil Schaap & Mark Wilder, mastering engineers (Various Artists) (Sony)	
2001	Steve Berkowitz, Seth Rothstein & Phil Schaap (compilation producers); Michael Brooks, Seth Foster, Ken Robertson, Tom "Curly" Ruff, Phil Schaap & Mark Wilder (mastering engineers)	The Complete Hot Five and Hot Seven Recordings · Columbia/Legacy	Louis Armstrong	The Best of Broadside 1962–1988: Anthems of the American Underground from the Pages of Broadside Magazine – Ronald D. Cohen & Jeff Place, compilation producers; Pete Reiniger, mastering engineer (Various Artists) (Smithsonian Folkways); Great Moments of the 20th Century – Michael Wesley Johnson, David McLees & Gordon Skene, compilation producers; Bob Fisher, mastering engineer (Various Artists) (Rhino); Respect: A Century of Women in Music – Julie D’Angelo & Holly George-Warren, compilation producers; Dan Hersch & Bill Inglot, mastering engineers (Various Artists) (Rhino); The Rubinstein Collection – Nathaniel S. Johnson, compilation producer; Hsi-Ling Chang, Marian M. Conaty, Michael O. Drexler, Thomas MacCluskey, Ward Marston, James Nichols, Francis X. Pierce, Jon M. Samuels & Michael Sobol, mastering engineers (Arthur Rubinstein) (RCA Red Seal/BMG Classics)	
2002	Michael Brooks & Michael Cuscuna (compilation producers); Matt Cavaluzzo, Harry Coster, Seth Foster, Darcy Proper, Ken Robertson & Mark Wilder (mastering engineers)	Lady Day: The Complete Billie Holiday on Columbia 1933–1944 · Columbia/Legacy	Billie Holiday	Charlie Parker: The Complete Savoy and Dial Studio Recordings 1944–1948 – Orrin Keepnews, compilation producer; Paul Reid III, mastering engineer (Charlie Parker) (Savoy/Atlantic); Arhoolie Records 40th Anniversary Collection, 1960–2000: The Journey of Chris Strachwitz – Chris Strachwitz & Elijah Wald, compilation producers; Mike Cogan, mastering engineer (Various Artists) (Arhoolie); The Long Road to Freedom: An Anthology of Black Music – David Belafonte, Harry Belafonte & Albert C. Pryor, compilation producers; Michael O. Drexler, mastering engineer (Various Artists) (Buddha); Washington Square Memoirs: The Great Urban Folk Boom, 1950–1970 – Ted Myers, compilation producer; Bob Fisher, mastering engineer (Various Artists) (Rhino)	
2003	Dean Blackwood (compilation producer); David Glasser & Christopher King (mastering engineers)	Screamin' and Hollerin' the Blues: The Worlds of Charley Patton · Revenant	Charley Patton	Artie Shaw: Self Portrait – Orrin Keepnews, compilation producer; Dennis Ferrante, mastering engineer (Artie Shaw) (Bluebird); The Complete OKeh and Brunswick Bix Beiderbecke, Frank Trumbauer and Jack Teagarden Sessions (1924–36) – Scott Wenzel, compilation producer; Doug Pomeroy, mastering engineer (Bix Beiderbecke, Frank Trumbauer & Jack Teagarden) (Mosaic); Dylan Thomas: The Caedmon Collection – Rick Harris & David Nolan, compilation producers; Leslie Mona-Mathus, mastering engineer (Dylan Thomas) (Caedmon); The Genius of the Electric Guitar – Michael Brooks & Michael Cuscuna, compilation producers; Seth Foster, Ken Robertson & Mark Wilder, mastering engineers (Charlie Christian) (Columbia/Legacy)	
2004	Steve Berkowitz, Alex Gibney, Andy McKaie & Jerry Rappaport (compilation producers); Gavin Lurssen & Joseph M. Palmaccio (mastering engineers)	Martin Scorsese Presents the Blues: A Musical Journey · Hip-O	Various Artists	Count Basie and His Orchestra—America's #1 Band! The Columbia Years – Orrin Keepnews, compilation producer; Seth Foster, Andreas Meyer & Mark Wilder, mastering engineers (Count Basie and His Orchestra) (Columbia/Legacy); Peggy Lee—The Singles Collection – Cy Godfrey & Steve Woof, compilation producers; Dave McEowen, Ron McMaster, Odea Murphy & Bob Norberg, mastering engineers (Peggy Lee) (EMI/Capitol); Sam Cooke with The Soul Stirrers—The Complete Specialty Records Recordings – Bill Belmont, Ralph Kaffel & Stuart Kremsky, compilation producers; Joe Tarantino, mastering engineer (Sam Cooke with The Soul Stirrers) (Specialty); Vintage Recordings from the 1903 Broadway Musical The Wizard of Oz – David Maxine, compilation producer; Adrian Cosentini, mastering engineer (Various Artists) (Hungry Tiger)	
2005	Daniel Cooper, Michael Gray (compilation producers); Joseph M. Palmaccio, Alan Stoker (mastering engineers)	Night Train to Nashville: Music City Rhythm & Blues, 1945–1970 · CMF/Lost Highway	Various Artists	The Complete Columbia Recordings of Woody Herman and His Orchestra & Woodchoppers (1945–1947) – Scott Wenzel, compilation producer; Malcolm Addey, Michael Brooks, Matt Cavaluzzo, Ken Robertson, mastering engineers (Woody Herman & His Orchestra) (Mosaic); Goodbye, Babylon – Steven Lance Ledbetter, compilation producer; David Glasser, Matt Sandoski, mastering engineers (Various Artists) (Dust-to-Digital); Let the Buyer Beware – Hal Willner, compilation producer; Eric Liljestrand, mastering engineer (Lenny Bruce) (Shout! Factory); Unearthed – Rick Rubin, compilation producer; Vlado Meller, mastering engineer (Johnny Cash) (American/Lost Highway)	
2006	Jeffrey Greenberg, Anna Lomax Wood (compilation producers); Adam Ayan, Steve Rosenthal (mastering engineers)	The Complete Library of Congress Recordings · Rounder	Jelly Roll Morton	Holy Ghost: Rare & Unissued Recordings (1962–70) – Dean Blackwood, Ben Young, compilation producers; Joe Lizzi, Kevin Reeves, Ben Young, mastering engineers (Albert Ayler) (Revenant); The Legend – Gregg Geller, compilation producer; Vic Anesini, mastering engineer (Johnny Cash) (Columbia/Legacy); Pure Genius: The Complete Atlantic Recordings (1952–1959) – James Austin, Ahmet Ertegun, compilation producers; Dan Hersch, Bill Inglot, mastering engineers (Ray Charles) (Atlantic/Rhino); You Ain't Talkin' to Me: Charlie Poole and the Roots of Country Music – Henry Sapoznik, compilation producer; Christopher King, Andreas Meyer, Darcy Proper, mastering engineers (Charlie Poole and Various Artists) (Columbia/Legacy)	
2007	Meagan Hennessey & Richard Martin (compilation producers); Tim Brooks, David Giovannoni & Richard Martin (mastering engineers)	Lost Sounds: Blacks and the Birth of the Recording Industry, 1891–1922 · Archeophone	Various Artists	Good for What Ails You: Music of the Medicine Shows, 1926–1937 – Marshall Wyatt, compilation producer; Christopher King, mastering engineer (Various Artists) (Old Hat); One Kiss Can Lead To Another: Girl Group Sounds Lost & Found – Sheryl Farber & Gary Stewart, compilation producers; Dan Hersch, Bill Inglot & Dave Schultz, mastering engineers (Various Artists) (Rhino); Poetry On Record: 98 Poets Read Their Work (1888–2006) – Rebekah Presson Mosby, compilation producer; Randy Perry, mastering engineer (Various Artists) (Shout! Factory); Rockin’ Bones: 1950's Punk & Rockabilly – James Austin & Cheryl Pawelski, compilation producers; Bill Inglot & Dave Schultz, mastering engineers (Various Artists) (Rhino)	
2008	Nora Guthrie & Jorge Arévalo Mateus (compilation producers); Jamie Howarth, Steve Rosenthal, Warren Russell-Smith & Dr. Kevin Short (mastering engineers)	The Live Wire: Woody Guthrie in Performance 1949 · Woody Guthrie Publications	Woody Guthrie	Actionable Offenses: Indecent Phonograph Recordings from the 1890s – David Giovannoni, Meagan Hennessey & Richard Martin, compilation producers; Richard Martin, mastering engineer (Various Artists) (Archeophone); Forever Changing: The Golden Age of Elektra Records 1963–1973 (Deluxe Edition) – Stuart Batsford, Mick Houghton & Phil Smee, compilation producers; Dan Hersch & Bill Inglot, mastering engineers (Various Artists) (Rhino); Love Is the Song We Sing: San Francisco Nuggets 1965–1970 – Alec Palao, compilation producer; Dan Hersch, Bill Inglot & Dave Schultz, mastering engineers (Various Artists) (Rhino); People Take Warning! Murder Ballads & Disaster Songs 1913–1938 – Christopher King & Henry "Hank" Sapoznik, compilation producers; Christopher King & Robert Vosgien, mastering engineers (Various Artists) (Tompkins Square)	
2009	Steven Lance Ledbetter & Art Rosenbaum (compilation producers); Michael Graves (mastering engineer)	Art of Field Recording Volume I: Fifty Years of Traditional American Music Documented by Art Rosenbaum · Dust-to-Digital	Various Artists	Classic Columbia, OKeh and Vocalion Lester Young with Count Basie (1936–1940) – Scott Wenzel, compilation producer; Malcolm Addey, Michael Brooks, Matt Cavaluzzo, Andreas Meyer & Mark Wilder, mastering engineers (Lester Young with Count Basie) (Mosaic); Debate '08: Taft and Bryan Campaign on the Edison Phonograph – David Giovannoni, Meagan Hennessey & Richard Martin, compilation producers; Richard Martin, mastering engineer (William Jennings Bryan and William Howard Taft) (Archeophone); Polk Miller & His Old South Quartette – Ken Flaherty Jr., compilation producer; Marcos Sueiro Bal, Ken Flaherty Jr., Kurt Nauck & Glenn Sage, mastering engineers (Polk Miller & His Old South Quartette) (Tompkins Square); To Be Free: The Nina Simone Story – Richard Seidel, compilation producer; Mark G. Wilder, mastering engineer (Nina Simone) (RCA/Legacy)	
2010	Andy McKaie (compilation producer); Erick Labson (mastering engineer)	The Complete Chess Masters (1950–1967) · Hip-O Select/Geffen	Little Walter	My Dusty Road – Scott Billington, Michael Creamer & Bill Nowlin, compilation producers; Doug Pomeroy, mastering engineer (Woody Guthrie) (Rounder); Origins of the Red Hot Mama, 1910–1922 – Meagan Hennessey & Richard Martin, compilation producers; Richard Martin, mastering engineer (Sophie Tucker) (Archeophone); Take Me to the Water: Immersion Baptism in Vintage Music and Photography 1890–1950 – Steven Lance Ledbetter & Jim Linderman, compilation producers; Robert Vosgien, mastering engineer (Various Artists) (Dust-to-Digital); Woodstock–40 Years On: Back to Yasgur's Farm – Cheryl Pawelski, Mason Williams & Andy Zax, compilation producers; Dave Schultz, mastering engineer (Various Artists) (Rhino)	
2011	Jeff Jones & Allan Rouse (compilation producers); Paul Hicks, Sean Magee, Guy Massey, Sam Okell & Steve Rooke (mastering engineers)	The Beatles: The Original Studio Recordings · Apple/Parlophone/Capitol	The Beatles	Alan Lomax in Haiti: Recordings for The Library of Congress, 1936–1937 – Jeffrey A. Greenberg, David Katznelson & Anna Lomax Wood, compilation producers; Steve Rosenthal & Warren Russell-Smith, mastering engineers (Various Artists) (Harte); The Complete Mother's Best Recordings...Plus! – Colin Escott, Mike Jason & Jett Williams, compilation producers; Joseph M. Palmaccio, mastering engineer (Hank Williams) (Time Life); Not Fade Away: The Complete Studio Recordings and More – Andy McKaie, compilation producer; Erick Labson, mastering engineer (Buddy Holly) (UMe/Hip-O Select/Geffen); Where The Action Is! Los Angeles Nuggets 1965–1968 –Alec Palao, Cheryl Pawelski & Andrew Sandoval, compilation producers; Dan Hersch & Andrew Sandoval, mastering engineers (Various Artists) (Rhino)	
2012	Paul McCartney (compilation producer); Sam Okell & Steve Rooke (mastering engineers)	Band on the Run (Paul McCartney Archive Collection – Deluxe Edition) · Hear Music	Paul McCartney and Wings	The Bristol Sessions 1927–1928: The Big Bang of Country Music – Christopher C. King & Ted Olson, compilation producers; Christopher C. King & Chris Zwarg, mastering engineers (Various Artists) (Bear Family); Complete Mythology – Tom Lunt, Rob Sevier & Ken Shipley, compilation producers; Jeff Lipton, mastering engineer (Syl Johnson) (Numero); Hear Me Howling!: Blues, Ballads & Beyond as Recorded by the San Francisco Bay by Chris Strachwitz in the 1960s – Chris Strachwitz, compilation producer; Mike Cogan, mastering engineer (Various Artists) (Arhoolie); Young Man with the Big Beat: The Complete '56 Elvis Presley Masters – Ernst Mikael Jorgenson, compilation producer; Vic Anesini, mastering engineer (Elvis Presley) (Legacy/RCA Victor)	
2013	Alan Boyd, Mark Linett, Brian Wilson & Dennis Wolfe (compilation producers); Mark Linett (mastering engineer)	The Smile Sessions (Deluxe Box Set) · Capitol	The Beach Boys	He Is My Story: The Sanctified Soul of Arizona Dranes – Josh Rosenthal, compilation producer; Bryan Hoffa & Christopher King, mastering engineers (Arizona Dranes) (Tompkins Square); Old-Time Smoky Mountain Music: 34 Historic Songs, Ballads and Instrumentals Recorded in the Great Smoky Mountains by 'Song Catcher' Joseph S. Hall – Kent Cave, Michael Montgomery & Ted Olson, compilation producers; John Fleenor & Steve Kemp, mastering engineers (Various Artists) (Great Smoky Mountains Association); Opika Pende: Africa at 78RPM – Steven Lance Ledbetter & Jonathan Ward, compilation producers; Michael Graves, mastering engineer (Various Artists) (Dust-to-Digital); Woody at 100: The Woody Guthrie Centennial Collection – Jeff Place & Robert Santelli, compilation producers; Pete Reiniger, mastering engineer (Woody Guthrie) (Smithsonian Folkways)	
2014	Teri Landi, Andrew Loog Oldham & Steve Rosenthal (compilation producers); Bob Ludwig (mastering engineer)	Charlie Is My Darling – Ireland 1965 · ABKCO	The Rolling Stones	Call it Art 1964–1965 – Joe Lizzi & Ben Young, compilation producers; Steve Fallone, Joe Lizzi & Ben Young, mastering engineers (New York Art Quartet) (Triple Point); Pictures of Sound: One Thousand Years of Educed Audio: 980–1980 – Patrick Feaster & Steven Lance Ledbetter, compilation producers; Michael Graves, mastering engineer (Various Artists) (Dust-to-Digital); Wagner: Der Ring Des Nibelungen (Deluxe Edition) – Philip Siney, compilation producer; Ben Turner, mastering engineer (Sir Georg Solti and Vienna Philharmonic Orchestra) (Decca)	
2014	Leo Sacks (compilation producer); Joseph M. Palmaccio, Tom Ruff & Mark Wilder (mastering engineers)	The Complete Sussex and Columbia Albums · Columbia/Legacy	Bill Withers		
2015	Colin Escott & Cheryl Pawelski (compilation producers); Michael Graves (mastering engineer)	The Garden Spot Programs, 1950 · Omnivore	Hank Williams	Black Europe: The Sounds and Images of Black People in Europe Pre–1927 – Jeffrey Green, Ranier E. Lotz & Howard Rye, compilation producers; Christian Zwarg, mastering engineer (Various Artists) (Bear Family); Happy: The 1920 Rainbo Orchestra Sides – Meagan Hennessey & Richard Martin, compilation producers; Richard Martin, mastering engineer (Isham Jones Rainbo Orchestra) (Archeophone); Longing for the Past: The 78 RPM Era in Southeast Asia – Steven Lance Ledbetter & David Murray, compilation producers; Michael Graves, mastering engineer (Various Artists) (Dust-to-Digital); There's a Dream I've Been Saving: Lee Hazlewood Industries 1966–1971 (Deluxe Edition) – Hunter Lea, Patrick McCarthy & Matt Sullivan, compilation producers; John Baldwin, mastering engineer (Various Artists) (Light In The Attic)	
2016	Steve Berkowitz, Jan Haust & Jeff Rosen (compilation producers); Peter J. Moore & Mark Wilder (mastering engineers)	The Bootleg Series Vol. 11: The Basement Tapes Complete · Columbia/Legacy	Bob Dylan & The Band	The Complete Concert by the Sea – Geri Allen, Jocelyn Arem & Steve Rosenthal, compilation producers; Jessica Thompson, mastering engineer (Erroll Garner) (Columbia/Legacy); Native North America Vol. 1: Aboriginal Folk, Rock, and Country 1966–1985 – Kevin Howes, compilation producer; Greg Mindorff, mastering engineer (Various Artists) (Light in the Attic); Parchman Farm: Photographs and Field Recordings, 1947–1959 – Steven Lance Ledbetter & Nathan Salsburg, compilation producers; Michael Graves, mastering engineer (Various Artists) (Dust-to-Digital); Songs My Mother Taught Me – Mark Puryear, compilation producer; Pete Reiniger, mastering engineer (Fannie Lou Hamer) (Smithsonian Folkways)	
2017	Steve Berkowitz & Jeff Rosen (compilation producers); Mark Wilder (mastering engineer)	The Bootleg Series Vol. 12: The Cutting Edge 1965–1966 (Collector's Edition) · Columbia/Legacy	Bob Dylan	Music of Morocco from the Library of Congress: Recorded by Paul Bowles, 1959 – April G. Ledbetter, Steven Lance Ledbetter, Bill Nowlin & Philip D. Schuyler, compilation producers; Rick Fisher & Michael Graves, mastering engineers (Various Artists) (Dust-to-Digital); Vladimir Horowitz: The Unreleased Live Recordings 1966–1983 – Bernard Horowitz, Andreas K. Meyer & Robert Russ, compilation producers; Andreas K. Meyer & Jeanne Montalvo, mastering engineers (Vladimir Horowitz) (Sony Classical); Ork Records: New York, New York – Rob Sevier & Ken Shipley, compilation producers; Jeff Lipton & Maria Rice, mastering engineers (Various Artists) (Numero); Waxing the Gospel: Mass Evangelism and the Phonograph, 1890–1900 – Michael Devecka, Meagan Hennessey & Richard Martin, compilation producers; Michael Devecka, David Giovannoni, Michael Khanchalian & Richard Martin, mastering engineers (Various Artists) (Archeophone)	
2018	Robert Russ (compilation producer); Martin Kistner & Andreas K. Meyer (mastering engineers)	Leonard Bernstein – The Composer · Sony Classical	Leonard Bernstein & Various Artists	Bobo Yeye: Belle Epoque in Upper Volta – Jon Kirby, Florent Mazzoleni, Rob Sevier & Ken Shipley, compilation producers; Jeff Lipton & Maria Rice, mastering engineers (Various Artists) (Numero); The Goldberg Variations: The Complete Unreleased Recording Sessions, June 1955 – Robert Russ, compilation producer; Mathias Erb, Martin Kistner & Andreas K. Meyer, mastering engineers (Glenn Gould) (Sony Classical); Sweet as Broken Dates: Lost Somali Tapes from the Horn of Africa – Nicolas Sheikholeslami & Vik Sohonie, compilation producers; Michael Graves, mastering engineer (Various Artists) (Ostinato); Washington Phillips and His Manzarene Dreams – Michael Corcoran, April G. Ledbetter & Steven Lance Ledbetter, compilation producers; Michael Graves, mastering engineer (Washington Phillips) (Dust-to-Digital)	
2019	William Ferris, April Ledbetter & Steven Lance Ledbetter (compilation producers); Michael Graves (mastering engineer)	Voices of Mississippi: Artists and Musicians Documented by William Ferris · Dust-to-Digital	Various Artists	Any Other Way – Rob Bowman, Douglas Mcgowan, Rob Sevier & Ken Shipley, compilation producers; Jeff Lipton, mastering engineer (Jackie Shane) (Numero); At the Louisiana Hayride Tonight... – Martin Hawkins, compilation producer; Christian Zwarg, mastering engineer (Various Artists) (Bear Family); Battleground Korea: Songs and Sounds of America's Forgotten War – Hugo Keesing, compilation producer; Christian Zwarg, mastering engineer (Various Artists) (Bear Family); A Rhapsody in Blue: The Extraordinary Life of Oscar Levant – Robert Russ, compilation producer; Andreas K. Meyer & Rebekah Wineman, mastering engineers (Oscar Levant) (Sony Classical)	
2020	Jeff Place & Robert Santelli (compilation producers); Pete Reiniger (mastering engineer)	Pete Seeger: The Smithsonian Folkways Collection · Smithsonian Folkways	Pete Seeger	The Girl from Chickasaw County: The Complete Capitol Masters – Andrew Batt & Kris Maher, compilation producers; Simon Gibson, mastering engineer (Bobbie Gentry) (UMC); The Great Comeback: Horowitz at Carnegie Hall – Robert Russ, compilation producer; Andreas K. Meyer & Jennifer Nulsen, mastering engineers (Vladimir Horowitz) (Sony Classical); Kankyō Ongaku: Japanese Ambient, Environmental & New Age Music 1980-1990 – Spencer Doran, Yosuke Kitazawa, Douglas McGowan & Matt Sullivan, compilation producers; John Baldwin, mastering engineer (Various Artists) (Light in the Attic); Woodstock – Back to the Garden: The Definitive 50th Anniversary Archive – Brian Kehew, Steve Woolard & Andy Zax, compilation producers; Dave Schultz, mastering engineer (Various Artists) (Rhino)	
2021	Lee Lodyga & Cheryl Pawelski (compilation producers); Michael Graves (mastering engineer)	It's Such A Good Feeling: The Best of Mister Rogers · Omnivore	Mister Rogers	Celebrated, 1895-1896 – Meagan Hennessey & Richard Martin, compilation producers; Richard Martin, mastering engineer (Unique Quartette) (Archeophone); Hittin' The Ramp: The Early Years (1936-1943) – Zev Feldman, Will Friedwald & George Klabin, compilation producers; Matthew Lutthans, mastering engineer (Nat King Cole) (Resonance); 1999 Super Deluxe Edition – Trevor Guy, Michael Howe & Kirk Johnson, compilation producers; Bernie Grundman, mastering engineer (Prince) (Warner); Souvenir – Carolyn Agger, compilation producer; Miles Showell, mastering engineer (Orchestral Manoeuvres in the Dark) (Virgin); Throw Down Your Heart: The Complete Africa Sessions. Béla Fleck, compilation producer; Richard Dodd, mastering engineer (Béla Fleck) (Craft)	
2022	Patrick Milligan & Joni Mitchell (compilation producers); Bernie Grundman (mastering engineer)	Joni Mitchell Archives Vol. 1: The Early Years (1963-1967) · Rhino	Joni Mitchell	Marian Anderson - Beyond the Music: Her Complete RCA Victor Recordings – Robert Russ, compilation producer; Nancy Conforti, Andreas K. Meyer & Jennifer Nulsen, mastering engineers (Marian Anderson) (Sony Classical); Etching the Voice: Emile Berliner and the First Commercial Gramophone Discs, 1889-1895 – Meagan Hennessey & Richard Martin, compilation producers; Richard Martin, mastering engineer; David Giovannoni & Richard Martin, restoration engineers (Various Artists) (Archeophone); Excavated Shellac: An Alternate History of the World's Music – April Ledbetter, Steven Lance Ledbetter & Jonathan Ward, compilation producers; Michael Graves, mastering engineer (Various Artists) (Dust-to-Digital); Sign O' The Times (Super Deluxe Edition) – Trevor Guy, Michael Howe & Kirk Johnson, compilation producers; Bernie Grundman, mastering engineer (Prince) (NPG Records/Warner)	
2023	Cheryl Pawelski & Jeff Tweedy (compilation producers); Bob Ludwig (mastering engineer)	Yankee Hotel Foxtrot (20th Anniversary Super Deluxe Edition) · Nonesuch	Wilco	Against the Odds: 1974–1982 - Tommy Manzi, Steve Rosenthal & Ken Shipley, compilation producers; Michael Graves, mastering engineer; Tom Camuso, restoration engineer (Blondie) (Capitol); The Goldberg Variations - The Complete Unreleased 1981 Studio Sessions - Robert Russ, compilation producer; Martin Kistner, mastering engineer (Glenn Gould) (Sony Classical); Life's Work - A Retrospective - Scott Billington, Ted Olson & Mason Williams, compilation producers; Paul Blakemore, mastering engineer (Doc Watson) (Craft); To Whom It May Concern - Jonathan Sklute, compilation producer; Kevin Marques Moo, mastering engineer; Lucas MacFadden, restoration engineer (Freestyle Fellowship) (Key Chain)	
2024	Robert Gordon, Deanie Parker, Cheryl Pawelski, Michele Smith & Mason Williams (compilation producers); Michael Graves (mastering engineer/restoration engineer)	Written In Their Soul: The Stax Songwriter Demos · Stax/Craft	Various Artists	Fragments - Time Out of Mind Sessions (1996-1997): The Bootleg Series, Vol. 17 - Steve Berkowitz & Jeff Rosen, compilation producers; Steve Addabbo, Greg Calbi, Steve Fallone, Chris Shaw & Mark Wilder, mastering engineers (Bob Dylan) (Columbia/Legacy); The Moaninest Moan of Them All: The Jazz Saxophone of Loren McMurray, 1920-1922 - Colin Hancock, Meagan Heannesey & Richard Martin, compilation producers; Richard Martin, mastering engineer/restoration engineer (Various Artists) (Archeophone); Playing For the Man at the Door: Field Recordings From the Collection of Mack McCormick, 1958-1971 - Jeff Place & John Troutman, compilation producers; Randy LeRoy & Charlie Pilzer, mastering engineers; Mike Petillo & Charlie Pilzer, restoration engineers (Various Artists) (Smithsonian Folkways); Words & Music, May 1965 (Deluxe Edition) - Laurie Anderson, Don Fleming, Jason Stern, Matt Sullivan & Hall Wilner, compilation producers; John Baldwin, mastering engineer; John Baldwin & Steve Rosenthal, restoration engineers (Lou Reed) (Light in the Attic)	
2025	Meagan Hennessey & Richard Martin (compilation producers); Richard Martin (mastering engineer/restoration engineer)	Centennial · Archeophone	King Oliver's Creole Jazz Band & Various Artists	Diamonds and Pearls: Super Deluxe Edition - L. Londell McMillan, Charles F. Spicer Jr. & Duane Tudahl, compilation producers; Brad Blackwood & Bernie Grundman, mastering engineers; Chris James, restoration engineer (Prince & New Power Generation) (NPG Records); Paul Robeson - Voice of Freedom: His Complete Columbia, RCA, HMV and Victor Recordings - Tom Laskey, Shana L. Redmond, Susan Robeson & Robert Russ, compilation producers; Nancy Conforti & Andreas K. Meyer, mastering engineers (Paul Robeson) (Sony Masterworks); Pepito y Paquito - Pepe De Lucía & Javier Doria, compilation producers; Jesús Bola, mastering engineer (Pepe De Lucía & Paco De Lucía) (BMG); The Sound of Music - Super Deluxe Edition - Mike Matessino & Mark Piro, compilation producers; Steve Genewick & Mike Matessino, mastering engineers (Various Artists - Original Soundtrack) (Craft)	
2026	Patrick Milligan & Joni Mitchell (compilation producers) Bernie Grundman (mastering engineer)	Joni Mitchell Archives Vol. 4: The Asylum Years (1976–1980) · Rhino	Joni Mitchell	The Making of Five Leaves Left - Cally Calloman, Joe Black & Johnny Chandler, compilation producers; Simon Heyworth & John Wood, mastering engineers; John Wood & Richard Whitaker, restoration engineers (Nick Drake) (Island); Roots Rocking Zimbabwe - The Modern Sounds of Harare's Townships 1975-1980 (Analog Africa No. 41) - Samy Ben Redjeb, compilation producer; Michael Graves, mastering engineer; Michael Graves & Jordan McLeod, restoration engineers (Various Artists) (Analog Africa); Super Disco Pirata - De Tepito Para El Mundo 1965-1980 (Aanalog Africa No. 39) - Samy Ben Redjeb, compilation producer; Michael Graves, mastering engineer; Jordan McLeod, restoration engineer (Various Artists) (Analog Africa); You Can't Hip A Square: The Doc Pomus Songwriting Demos - Will Bratton, Sharyn Felder & Cheryl Pawelski, compilation producers; Michael Graves, mastering engineer; Michael Graves & Jordan McLeod, restoration engineers (Doc Pomus) (Omnivore)	
2027				The Bootleg Series Vol. 18: Through the Open Window 1956–1963 - Steve Berkowitz & Sean Wilentz, compilation producers; Steve Addabbo & Michael Piacentini, mastering engineers; Steve Addabbo & Michael Piacentini, restoration engineers (Bob Dylan); Classic V-Disc Big Band Jazz Sessions Limited Edition Box Set Scott Wenzel, compilation producer; Shane Carroll & Nancy Conforti, mastering engineers (Various Artists); Clifton Chenier: King of Louisiana Blues & Zydeco - Adam Machado, compilation producer; Jessica Thompson, mastering engineer; Jessica Thompson, restoration engineer (Clifton Chenier); Ma Rainey: Mother Of The Blues, The Complete Paramount Recordings 1923-1928 - Lars Edegran, compilation producer; Doug Benson, mastering engineer; Doug Benson, restoration engineer (Ma Rainey); Polish Radio Sessions 1970-1991 - Adam Domagala, compilation producer; Jacek Gawlowski, mastering engineer; Jacek Gawlowski, restoration engineer (Tomasz Stańko)	
