= Pumpkin Center, Missouri =

Pumpkin Center, Missouri may refer to one of these small communities in Missouri:

- Pumpkin Center, Dallas County, Missouri
- Pumpkin Center, Nodaway County, Missouri

== See also ==
- Pumpkin Center (disambiguation)
