= Punkin =

Punkin may refer to

- Pumpkin
- Punkin Center (disambiguation), several localities in the United States
- Yakiv Punkin (1921–1994), Ukrainian wrestler
- Punkin' Puss & Mushmouse, an American cartoon
- "Punkin Chunkin" (Modern Family), the ninth episode of the third season of the American sitcom Modern Family
- PunkinHed, a 2007 extended play by the American rapper Boondox
