= John Pfeiffer =

John Pfeiffer may refer to:

- John Pfeiffer (record producer)
- John Pfeiffer (politician)
