= Robert Russ (music producer) =

German music producer

Robert Russ (born 20 September 1971) is a music producer from Berlin-Reinickendorf, Germany. He is the first German producer to be awarded with a Grammy for the Best Historical Album at the 60th Annual Grammy Awards in 2018.

== Life ==
Robert Russ is mainly known in the United States as a producer of elaborate artist editions with recordings of Columbia Records and RCA Records (both part of Sony Music Entertainment): "Robert Russ, who produced Sony's recent boxed sets of Reiner/Chicago and Pierre Monteux recordings, has done as usual thorough job" (John von Rhein, Chicago Tribune, 13. December 2016). His "ambitious archival project" (Anthony Tommasini, The New York Times, 15. November 2013), the release of previously unknown live recordings of American pianist Vladimir Horowitz from New York's Carnegie Hall, caused a stir in 2013.

His historically significant documentary "the ultimate find of recording history" (Anthony Tommasini, The New York Times, 2. February 2018), a set with Canadian pianist Glenn Gould’s complete recording sessions for his famous debut album of Bach's Goldberg Variations Glenn Gould—The Goldberg Variations—The Complete Unreleased Recording Sessions June 1955 was nominated for a Grammy in 2017, and in 2016 he received a nomination for the edition Vladimir Horowitz—The Unreleased Live Recordings 1966–1983, a collection of 25 previously unpublished live recitals of the pianist.

In 2021, Russ produced the first complete edition of all recordings by African-American singer and US civil rights activist Marian Anderson "A Voice of Authenticity and Justice" (Anthony Tommasini: New York Times, 5 November 2021). The edition, "impressively transferred and mastered" (Barbara Jepson: The Wall Street Journal, 14 August 2021), was nominated for a Grammy in November 2021.

With Paul Robeson—Voice of Freedom, "Sony’s superbly annotated set, expertly transferred from shellac originals" (Rob Cowan: Gramophone, 29 November 2024), about the African American singer, actor, and activist Paul Robeson, Russ received his eighth Grammy nomination as compilation producer for Best Historical Album within eight years.

His edition Arthur Rubinstein—The Complete Album Collection with 142 CDs was awarded the World Record for the "Largest CD box set for a classical instrumentalist" in 2011.

== Awards ==
Awarded to Russ or to releases produced by him:

- 2024 Grammy Award Nomination – Best Historical Album: Paul Robeson—Voice of Freedom
- 2022 Grammy Award Nomination – Best Historical Album: Glenn Gould—The Goldberg Variations—The Complete Unreleased 1981 Studio Sessions
- 2022 Recording Academy Award (Japan) – 歴史的録音 (Historical Recording): Dimitri Mitropoulos—The Complete RCA and Columbia Album Collection
- 2022 Diapason d'or de l'année – Rééditions (Reissues): Dimitri Mitropoulos—The Complete RCA and Columbia Album Collection
- 2021 Grammy Award Nomination – Best Historical Album: Marian Anderson—Beyond the Music—Her Complete RCA Victor Recordings
- 2020 Edison Award – The Document: Bruno Walter—The Complete Columbia Album Collection
- 2020 Diapason d'or de l'année – Rééditions (Reissues): Bruno Walter—The Complete Columbia Album Collection
- 2019 Grammy Award Nomination – Best Historical Album: The Great Comeback—Horowitz at Carnegie Hall
- 2019 Diapason d’or de l’année – Archives: George Szell—The Complete Columbia Album Collection
- 2019 Grammy Award Nomination – Best Historical Album: A Rhapsody in Blue—The Extraordinary Life of Oscar Levant
- 2019 ICMA Award – Historical Recordings: Birgit Nilsson—The Great Live Recordings
- 2018 Opus Klassik Award – Editorische Leistung des Jahres (Editorial Achievement of the Year): Leonard Bernstein—The Composer
- 2018 Grammy Award – Best Historical Album: Leonard Bernstein—The Composer
- 2018 Grammy Award Nomination – Best Historical Album: Glenn Gould—The Goldberg Variations—The Complete Unreleased Recording Sessions June 1955
- 2017 Diapason d’or de l’année – Rééditions (Reissues): Rudolf Serkin—The Complete Columbia Album Collection
- 2017 Grammy Award Nomination – Best Historical Album: Vladimir Horowitz—The Unreleased Live Recordings 1966–1983
- 2015 CHOC de l’année: Glenn Gould Remastered—The Complete Columbia Album Collection
- 2015 Diapason d’or de l’année – Rééditions (Reissues): Pierre Monteux—The Complete RCA Album Collection
- 2013 CHOC de l’année – Rééditions (Reissues): Vladimir Horowitz–Live at Carnegie Hall
- 2012 Echo Klassik – Musik-DVD Produktion des Jahres (Music DVD of the Year): Glenn Gould on Television—The Complete CBC Broadcasts
- 2012 Edison Award – Best Documentation: Arthur Rubinstein—The Complete Album Collection
- 2011 Guinness World Record – Largest CD box set for a classical instrumentalist: Arthur Rubinstein—The Complete Album Collection
- 2010 Guinness World Record – Largest CD box set for a classical instrumentalist: Jascha Heifetz—The Complete Album Collection
