= Teacher's Beau =

- Directed by: Gus Meins
- Produced by: Hal Roach
- Starring: George McFarland; Carl Switzer; Scotty Beckett; Billie Thomas; Matthew Beard
- Cinematography: Art Lloyd
- Edited by: Robert O. Crandall
- Music by: Leroy Shield
- Distributed by: MGM
- Release date: April 27, 1935
- Running time: 18' 48"
- Country: United States
- Language: English

Teacher's Beau is a 1935 Our Gang short comedy film directed by Gus Meins. It was the 136th Our Gang short to be released.

== Plot ==
On the last day of school, the gang learns that their beloved teacher Miss Jones is getting married and that they'll have a new teacher in September, Mrs. Wilson. Miss Jones's fiancé Ralph playfully paints a frightening picture of Mrs. Wilson as "a dried-up, mean old woman," neglecting to inform the kids that his last name is Wilson and that Miss Jones will continue to be their teacher under her married name.

Thanks to Ralph's ill-timed joshing, the youngsters convince themselves that the only way to retain their favorite teacher is to break up the wedding, starting with the prenuptial reception, where the kids first attempt to write a sympathetic speech for Alfalfa to recite, but that ultimately fails when he loses his voice. Next Spanky and Alfalfa disguise themselves as a rival "Man" to scare Ralph, however seeing through the obvious ruse foils it by giving Spanky a cigar that drops onto Alfalfa. Next Spanky and Buckweat surreptitiously spike the food by emptying the salt and pepper shakers into it and full bottles of tabasco sauce and horseradish. After they do this, they discover that "Mrs. Wilson" is actually Miss Jones and that Ralph, whose surname is Wilson, will let "her continue to teach [the class] as long as she'd like." Unfortunately, the gang must force themselves into eating the ultra-spicy spaghetti to save face. They all rush to the water spigot as soon as they are excused from the table.

== Cast ==
- Matthew Beard as Stymie
- Scotty Beckett as Scotty
- George McFarland as Spanky
- Carl Switzer as Alfalfa
- Billie Thomas as Buckwheat
- Alvin Buckelew as Alvin
- Jerry Tucker as Jerry
- Rex Downing as Our Gang member
- Pete The Pup as himself

=== Additional cast ===
- Harold Switzer as Harold
- The Cabin Kids as Themselves
- Dorothy Dandridge as Cabin Kid (stand-in)
- Jannie Hoskins as Cabin Kid (stand-in)
- Billy Bletcher as Chairman Of The Board
- Arletta Duncan as Miss Jones
- Gus Leonard as Old man
- Robert McKenzie as Laughing guest
- Edward Norris as Ralph Wilson
- Barry Downing as Classroom extra
- Marianne Edwards as Classroom extra
- Dorian Johnston as Classroom extra
- Margaret Kerry as Classroom extra
- Tommy McFarland as Classroom extra
- Donald Proffitt as Classroom extra
- Jackie White as Classroom extra
- Ernie Alexander as Guest
- Bobby Burns as Guest
- Charlie Hall as Guest
- Fred Holmes as Guest
- Lon Poff as Guest
- Beverley Baldey as Undetermined role
- Jamie Kauffman as Undetermined role
- Snooky Valentine as Undermined role

== Other notes ==
- Teacher's Beau marks the final appearance of Matthew "Stymie" Beard and Jannie Hoskins. At one time the star of the series, Beard had a single line of dialogue in Teacher's Beau. Jannie was in Our Gang since the silent era. Dorothy Dandridge appears in this film.
- The version included in the "Little Rascals" television package was edited back in 1971 for various reasons. It continued airing on AMC in 2001–03 in edited form, unlike other entries in the series. An uncut version was released on VHS home video in the 1980s and 1990s. A remastered, restored version was released on Blu-ray in 2022 as part of The Little Rascals: The Complete Collection Centennial Edition.
- The rendition of "Old MacDonald Had a Farm" was on performed by the Cabin Kids. When they return to their seats, two members of the quintet are replaced by stand-ins, Dorothy Dandridge and Jannie Hoskins, the younger sister of Allen Hoskins, who played Farina in 1922–31.
- Brothers Alfalfa and Harold Switzer perform the song "Ticklish Reuben" before dinner is served.

== See also ==
- Our Gang filmography
