= Mississippi (film) =

1935 film by A. Edward Sutherland and Wesley Ruggles

- Theatrical release poster
- Directed by: A. Edward Sutherland
- Screenplay by: Francis Martin; Jack Cunningham
- Based on: Magnolia by Booth Tarkington
- Produced by: Arthur Hornblow Jr.
- Starring: Bing Crosby; W. C. Fields; Joan Bennett
- Cinematography: Charles Lang
- Edited by: Chandler House
- Music by: Howard Jackson (uncredited), Richard Rodgers, Lorenz Hart
- Production company: Paramount Pictures
- Distributed by: Paramount Pictures
- Release date: March 22, 1935 (USA)
- Running time: 73 minutes
- Country: United States
- Language: English

Mississippi is a 1935 American musical comedy film directed by A. Edward Sutherland and starring Bing Crosby, W. C. Fields, and Joan Bennett. Written by Francis Martin and Jack Cunningham based on the novel Magnolia by Booth Tarkington, the film is about a young pacifist who, after refusing on principle to defend his sweetheart's honor and being banished in disgrace, joins a riverboat troupe as a singer and acquires a reputation as a crackshot after a saloon brawl in which a villain accidentally kills himself with his own gun. The film was produced and distributed by Paramount Pictures.

Mississippi has the distinction of being the only W.C. Fields film with a score by Richard Rodgers and Lorenz Hart. It is also the only film in which Fields co-starred with Crosby. Photographed by Charles Lang, the film featured art direction by Hans Dreier and Bernard Herzbrun and was edited by Chandler House. The sound man was Eugene Merritt. The original running time of this black-and-white film was 80 minutes. The film has been released on VHS and DVD as part of the W.C. Fields Collection in the United Kingdom.

== Plot ==
Commodore Jackson is the captain of a Mississippi showboat in the late nineteenth century. Tom Grayson is engaged to be married and has been disgraced for refusing to fight a duel with Major Patterson.

Accused of being a coward, Grayson joins Jackson's showboat. Over the duration of the film, the behavior of the meek and mild Tom Grayson alters as a consequence of the constant representation of him, by Commodore Jackson, as "The Notorious Colonel Steele", "the Singing Killer", and the constant attribution, by Jackson, of duelling victories by Grayson to unrelated corpses freshly dragged from the river beside the showboat as "yet another victim of the notorious Colonel Steele, the Singing Killer".

The film provides sufficient opportunities for Crosby to sing the Rodgers and Hart songs, including the centerpiece number, "Soon", while Fields gets to tell some outlandish stories. Crosby and Fields worked well together and there is one memorable scene in which Fields tries to tell Crosby how to act tougher. In the film, Crosby performs a number of sight gags involving a chair and a bowie knife. Another highlight is Fields' story about his exploits among one notorious Indian tribe.

== Cast ==
- Bing Crosby as Tom Grayson
- W. C. Fields as Commodore Jackson
- Joan Bennett as Lucy Rumford
- Queenie Smith as Alabam'
- Gail Patrick as Elvira Rumford
- Claude Gillingwater Sr. as General Rumford
- John Miljan as Major Patterson
- Edward Pawley as Joe Patterson
- Fred Kohler as Captain Blackie
- Five Cabin Kids as the "Inky Kids"
- John Larkin as Rumbo
- Libby Taylor as Lavinia
- Teresa Maxwell-Conover as Miss Markham
- Paul Hurst as Hefty
- Jan Duggan as Thrilled Passenger in Pilot House (uncredited)
- Ann Sheridan as Schoolgirl (uncredited)
- Harry Myers as Stage Manager (uncredited)
- King Baggot as First gambler
- Mahlon Hamilton as Second gambler
- Clarence Geldart as Hotel manager
- Stanley Andrews as Gambler with Four Aces
- Matthew Betz as Man at Bar
- James Burke as Skeptical Passenger in Pilot House
- Helene Chadwick as Attendee at Opening
- Charles King as Desk Clerk
- Jean Rouverol as Lucy's Schoolgirl Friend

== Notes ==
There were two previous Paramount film versions of Booth Tarkington's play, Magnolia. The first in 1924 filmed as a silent under the title The Fighting Coward starred Cullen Landis, Phyllis Haver, Mary Astor, Ernest Torrence and Noah Beery Sr. The second version released in 1929, as River of Romance; in early talkie and in silent editions, starred Buddy Rogers, Wallace Beery, Fred Kohler, Mary Brian, June Collyer and Henry B. Walthall. Fred Kohler reprises his Captain Blackie here from the 1929 film.

== Reception ==
- The New York Times - "Amid an atmosphere of magnolia, crinoline, and Kentucky whiskey, the boozy genius of Mr. Fields and the subterranean croon of Mr. Crosby strike a happy compromise."
- Motion Picture Herald - "The [film] is a melodramatic and sometimes tense romance. Fields' comedy, in both dialogue and action, is good for its full quota of laughs."
- Variety - "Paramount obviously couldn't make up its mind what it wanted to do with the film; it's rambling and hokey. For a few minutes it's sheer farce, for a few moments it's romance. And it never jells...Fields works hard throughout the film and saves it, giving it whatever entertainment value it has."

== Soundtrack ==
- "Swanee River"
- "It's Easy to Remember" (Rodgers & Hart)
- "Down by the River" (Rodgers & Hart)
- "Soon" (Rodgers & Hart) - all sung by Bing Crosby
- "Little David, Play on Your Harp" (Traditional negro spiritual) - sung by The Cabin Kids
- "Roll Mississippi" (Rodgers & Hart) - sung by Queenie Smith and The Cabin Kids

Crosby recorded his songs commercially for Decca Records as well. "Soon" and "It's Easy to Remember" both topped the charts of the day. His songs were included on the Bing's Hollywood series.

== Sources ==
- Deschner, Donald, The Films of W.C. Fields (New York: The Citadel Press, 1966)
- Green, Stanley (1999) Hollywood Musicals Year by Year (2nd ed.), pub. Hal Leonard Corporation ISBN 0-634-00765-3 page 45
