= Rossini Vrionides =

American Vaudeville performer

Rossini Waugh Stewart Vrionides
- Born: June 25, 1896; Tipton, Indiana, US
- Died: November 25, 1943
- Other names: Gypsy Rossini
- Occupation(s): Actress, composer, organist, violinist
- Spouse(s): Cal Stewart (m. 1914–1919), Christos Vrionides (m. 1933)

Rossini Waugh Stewart Vrionides (June 25, 1896 – November 25, 1943) was an American actress, composer, organist and violinist. She performed in vaudeville and on stage under the name "Gypsy Rossini."

Rossini was born in Tipton, Indiana, to James and Eva (Overman) Waugh. She was playing the lead in the play "Running for Governor" at McVickers Theatre in Chicago when she met Cal Stewart. They married in New York on July 6, 1914.

Rossini and her brother and sister toured and appeared in vaudeville with Stewart. Rossini played the role of Aunt Nancy in his popular "Uncle Josh" shows. She also played violin as Gypsy Rossini, accompanied by her sister Marjorie on piano.

Stewart died in 1919. Rossini continued performing and gave organ and violin lessons. She taught violin at St. Joseph's Academy in Tipton for several years, before marrying conductor Christos Vrionides on April 19, 1933.

Vrionides and Rossini composed A Cycle of Whitman Poems for mixed chorus and soloists in 1940, based on text by Walt Whitman and published by M. Baron. The best known pieces in the cycle are Out of the Rolling Ocean the Crowd and Washington's Monument.
