= Archeophone Records =

Record company and label

- Founded: 1998
- Founder: Richard Martin; Meagan Hennessey
- Genre: Jazz, pop, spoken word
- Country of origin: United States
- Location: Champaign, Illinois
- Official website: www.archeophone.com

Archeophone Records is a record company and label founded in 1998 to document the early days of America's recording history. It was started by Richard Martin and Meagan Hennessey, a husband and wife who run the company in Champaign, Illinois. Archeophone restores and remasters audio from cylinders and discs of jazz, popular music, vaudeville, and spoken word recordings.

Archeophone has released recordings by Billy Murray, Bert Williams, Guido Deiro, Nora Bayes, Jack Norworth, Eddie Morton, and by jazz ensembles the Six Brown Brothers, the Benson Orchestra of Chicago, and Art Hickman's Orchestra.

Compilations include Vess Ossman, Arthur Collins and Byron G. Harlan, Henry Burr, Bob Roberts, Ada Jones, Fred Van Eps, Sophie Tucker, Harry Lauder, and the American, Peerless, and Haydn Quartets.

The company is not affiliated with the Archéophone manufacturer Henri Chamoux.

== Awards and honors ==
- Grammy Award for Best Historical Album, Lost Sounds: Blacks and the Birth of the Recording Industry, 1891–1922, 2006
- Grammy Award for Best Historical Album, Centennial, 2024
- Grammy Award for Best Album Notes, Centennial, 2024

=== Grammy Award nominations ===
Best Historical Album

- Actionable Offenses: Indecent Phonograph Recordings from the 1890s (2007)
- Debate '08: Taft and Bryan Campaign on the Edison Phonograph (2008)
- Sophie Tucker, Origins of the Red Hot Mama, 1910-1922 (2009)
- Isham Jones, Happy: The 1920 Rainbo Orchestra Sides (2014)
- Waxing the Gospel: Mass Evangelism & the Phonograph, 1890–1900 (2016)
- Celebrated, 1895-1896 (2020)
- Etching the Voice: Emile Berliner and the First Commercial Gramophone Discs, 1889-1895 (2021)
- The Moaninest Moan of Them All: The Jazz Saxophone of Loren McMurray, 1920-1922 (2023)

Best Album Notes

- Actionable Offenses: Indecent Phonograph Recordings from the 1890s (2007)
- Debate '08: Taft and Bryan Campaign on the Edison Phonograph (2008)
- Sophie Tucker, Origins of the Red Hot Mama, 1910–1922 (2009)
- There Breathes a Hope: The Legacy of John Work II and His Fisk Jubilee Quartet, 1909–1916 (2010)
- Isham Jones, Happy: The 1920 Rainbo Orchestra Sides (2014)
- Joseph C. Smith's Orchestra, Songs of the Night: Dance Recordings, 1916–1925 (2015)
- Waxing the Gospel: Mass Evangelism & the Phonograph, 1890–1900 (2016)
- Edouard-Léon Scott de Martinville, Inventor of Sound Recording: A Bicentennial Tribute (2017)
- 4 Banjo Songs, 1891-1897: Foundational Recordings of America’s Iconic Instrument (2018)
- Alpine Dreaming: The Helvetia Records Story, 1920-1924 (2018)
- The Product of Our Souls: The Sound and Sway of James Reese Europe's Society Orchestra (2018)
- At the Minstrel Show: Minstrel Routines From the Studio, 1894-1926 (2020)
- The Missing Link: How Gus Haenschen Got Us From Joplin to Jazz and Shaped the Music Business (2020)
- Etching the Voice: Emile Berliner and the First Commercial Gramophone Discs, 1889-1895 (2021)
- After Midnight (2024)

== See also ==
- List of record labels
