= Eddie Morton =

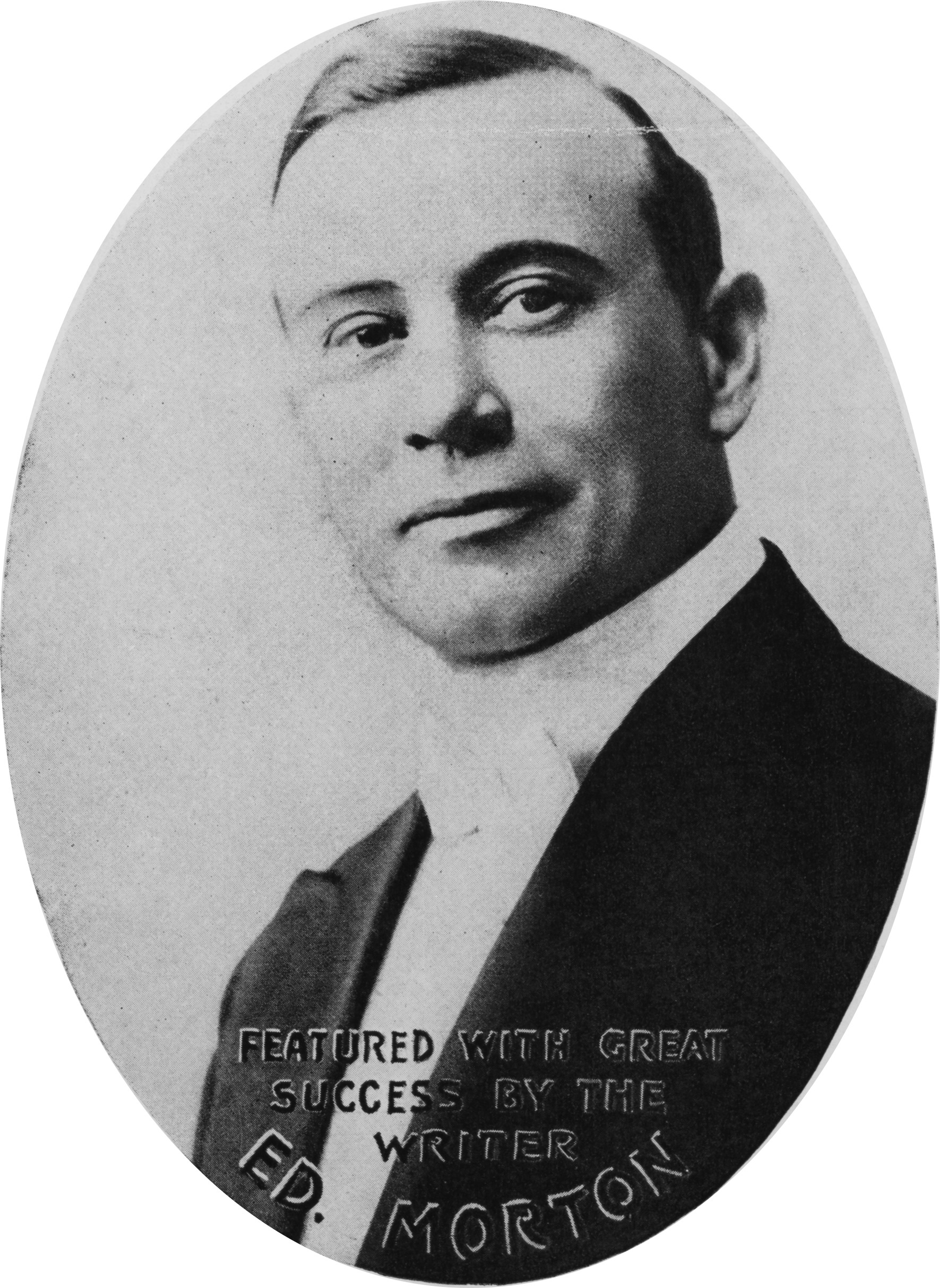

Background information
- Born: Edward Farren Morton; May 15, 1870; Philadelphia, Pennsylvania, United States
- Died: April 11, 1938 (aged 67)
- Genres: Vaudeville, comic songs, popular music
- Years active: c.1906–1926
- Labels: Victor, Columbia, Edison, Zonophone. Archeophone (reissue)

Edward Farren Morton (May 15, 1870 – April 11, 1938), was an American singer and comedian who recorded during the ragtime era. Known as "The Singing Cop", he has been described as "one of the most extraordinary performers of the early recording industry."

== Biography ==
Eddie Morton was born in Philadelphia, Pennsylvania, the son of actor C.H. Morton, who was in the original cast of The Black Crook. From about 1898 until about 1905, he worked for the Philadelphia Police Department, leading to his later billing as "The Singing Cop". He then became a variety performer, and in 1907 appeared at the Madison Square Roof Garden in New York City in the cast of The Maid and the Millionaire, a musical comedy. The following year he toured as part of M. M. Thiese's Rollickers burlesque show, and then became a popular attraction in the vaudeville shows run by Benjamin Franklin Keith and Sylvester Z. Poli.

In 1907, Morton made his first recordings as a gruff-voiced comic baritone and over the next few years recorded extensively for Victor, Columbia, Edison, Zonophone and other companies. His successes included "That's Gratitude", "Just a Friend of the Family", "In The Right Church, But The Wrong Pew", "You Ain't Talking To Me", "The Party that Wrote ‘Home, Sweet Home' Never Was a Married Man", "What's the Matter with Father?", and "Oceana Roll", first released in 1911 on the flip side of "Alexander's Ragtime Band" by Collins and Harlan. As a Tin Pan Alley "song plugger", many of his songs also featured in the repertoires of rival performers Arthur Collins and Bert Williams, including "coon songs". Morton also wrote some of his own comic material.

Morton made no recordings after 1917 but he continued as a popular vaudeville attraction until 1926. He then retired to run a golf club and a restaurant, Ed Morton's Little Bit of Broadway, at Wildwood, New Jersey. In 1938, Morton died of a heart attack at the age of 67.

== Legacy ==
A compilation CD of Morton's recordings between 1907 and 1910, The Sound of Vaudeville, was issued by Archeophone Records in 2003. A second CD compilation, Ed. Morton's "Bit of Broadway", was released by Archeophone in 2012.

"I'm A Member Of The Midnight Crew", a composition by William Jerome and Jean Schwartz was recorded by Eddie Morton in 1909. This recording was discovered by Toby Fox, and an a capella cover of it was used in the webcomic Homestuck, in the page “DD: Ascend more casually.” This use inspired covers by fellow Homestuck music team members David Ko and Michael Guy Bowman.
