= Ticklish Reuben =

1900 song by Cal Stewart

- Label from phonograph cylinder

Single by Cal Stewart
- Written: 1900
- Released: 1902
- Recorded: April 1902
- Genre: novelty folk
- Label: Columbia
- Songwriter: Cal Stewart

"Ticklish Reuben" is a folk song written by Cal Stewart in 1900. Released on the Columbia label, then later on Victor, the song is a prime example of the "laughing song" genre. Initially, the tune starts off normally, then descends into jolly, rhythmic laughing.

== Lyrics as follows ==
Oh,
My name is Ticklish Reuben
From way down in old Vermont
And ev'rything seems ticklish to me

I've been tickled by a feather
I've been tickled by a wasp
I've been tickled by a yellow bumblebee

I have always got a tickled sort of way about my clothes
It doesn't really matter where I be
I am tickled in the morning and I'm tickled in the night
Something's always sure to tickle me

hah hah hah hah hah hah hah hah hah hah hah hah hah hah
hah hah hah hah hah hah hah hah hah hah

(repeat x12)

Once I put some pepper into Dad's snuffbox
And the way he acted was a sight to see
Well he coughed and he sneezed till I thought he'd have a fit
And then he took me out to tickle me

I was always getting tickled by someone about the house
So why they take to ticklin' I could never see
And the apple-butter paddle it is all in splinters now
Daddy wore it out a-ticklin' me

== Other versions ==
The song became popular among hillbilly artists in the 1920s. Among the most influential was the version by Uncle Dave Macon as "Something's Always Sure to Tickle Me" on Vocalion Records, changing the lyrics of the first verse to name himself "little Davie" and the home state to "Tennessee". It was recorded as part of the Bristol Sessions by the Smyth County Ramberlers on October 27, 1927 and released on Victor 40144. The song was performed by brothers Alfalfa and Harold Switzer in the Our Gang short film Teacher's Beau (1935).

It was included on the Cathedral Quartet's 1970 album It's Music time as "Laughing Song".
