= Joni Mitchell Archives – Vol. 4: The Asylum Years (1976–1980) =

2024 six-disc box set by Joni Mitchell

Box set by Joni Mitchell
- Released: October 4, 2024
- Recorded: 1976–1980
- Label: Rhino
- Producer: Joni Mitchell

Joni Mitchell chronology
The Asylum Albums (1976–1980) (2024)	Joni Mitchell Archives – Vol. 4: The Asylum Years (1976–1980) (2024)	Hejira Demos (2025)

Joni Mitchell Archives – Vol. 4: The Asylum Years (1976–1980) is a six-disc box set by Canadian musician Joni Mitchell, released on October 4, 2024, by Rhino Records. The box is the fourteenth overall release and fourth offering of unreleased material from the Joni Mitchell Archives, a planned series of releases containing remastered material from the singer's personal archives. Formatted in chronological order, the fourth volume of the series consists of the archived material that was recorded during the second half of Mitchell's tenure at Asylum Records, which includes the years between the release of her eighth studio album, Hejira (1976) and her second live album, Shadows and Light (1980). The album won the 2026 Grammy Award for Best Historical Album.

== Reception ==
Professional ratings
Aggregate scores
Source	Rating
Metacritic	90/100
Review scores
Source	Rating
AllMusic	4/5 stars
Mojo	5/5 stars
Rolling Stone	3.5/5 stars
Uncut	4.5/5 stars
Under the Radar	9/10 stars

Joni Mitchell Archives – Vol. 4 has received positive reviews from critics and was awarded the 2026 Grammy award for Best Historical Album. On Metacritic which assigns a normalized rating out of 100 to reviews from mainstream critics, the set has a score of 90 based on six reviews, indicating "universal acclaim". In his review for AllMusic, Thom Jurek complimented the live performances, highlighting an early version of "Coyote", as well as renditions of "Help Me", "Just Like This Train", "Furry Sings the Blues", and "Don't Interrupt the Sorrow". Jurek also praised the set's ability to "illuminate the studio albums" from which the material is derived, as well as display the evolutionary process of the songs.

== Track listing ==
All tracks are written by Joni Mitchell, except where noted.

=== Disc one ===
Rolling Thunder Revue: Live In Niagara Falls Convention Center, Niagara Falls, NY (November 15, 1975)
No.	Title	Length
1.	"Jericho"	3:11

Rolling Thunder Revue: Live at Harvard Square Theater, Cambridge, MA (November 20, 1975)
No.	Title	Length
2.	"Introduction – Bob Neuwirth"	0:23
3.	"Edith and the Kingpin"	4:16
4.	"Don't Interrupt the Sorrow"	3:58

Rolling Thunder Revue: Live at Music Hall, Boston, MA (November 21, 1975)
No.	Title	Length
5.	"Introduction – Bob Neuwirth"	0:29
6.	"Harry's House"	4:13

Rolling Thunder Revue: Live in Bangor, Bangor, ME (November 27, 1975)
No.	Title	Length
7.	"A Case of You"	6:37

Rolling Thunder Revue: Gordon Lightfoot’s House, Toronto, ON, Canada (November 30, 1975)
No.	Title	Length
8.	"Woman of Heart and Mind"	3:03

Rolling Thunder Revue: GLive at Montreal Forum, Montreal, QC, Canada (December 4, 1975)
No.	Title	Length
9.	"Introduction – Bob Neuwirth"	0:32
10.	"Intro to Coyote"	0:38
11.	"Coyote"	4:32

1976 Tour of the United States: Live in Madison, Dane County Coliseum, Madison, WI (February 29, 1976)
No.	Title	Length
12.	"Help Me"	3:18

1976 Tour of the United States: Live at Music Hall, Boston, MA (February 19, 1976)
No.	Title	Length
13.	"Love or Money"	4:32
14.	"Free Man in Paris"	3:03
15.	"For the Roses"	4:31
16.	"Cold Blue Steel and Sweet Fire"	6:19
17.	"Big Yellow Taxi"	2:56
18.	"Shades of Scarlett Conquering"	4:23

1976 Tour of the United States: Live at Nassau Coliseum, Uniondale, NY (February 20, 1976)
No.	Title	Length
19.	"For Free"	5:34

=== Disc two ===
1976 Tour of the United States: Live at Music Hall, Boston, MA (February 19, 1976)
No.	Title	Length
1.	"Intro to Coyote/Don Juan's Reckless Daughter"	0:20
2.	"Coyote/Don Juan's Reckless Daughter"	9:58

1976 Tour of the United States: Live in Madison, Dane County Coliseum, Madison, WI (February 29, 1976)
No.	Title	Length
3.	"Just Like This Train"	4:15

1976 Tour of the United States: Live at Music Hall, Boston, MA (February 19, 1976)
No.	Title	Length
4.	"Shadows and Light"	5:34
5.	"In France They Kiss on Main Street"	3:19

1976 Tour of the United States: Live at Duke University, Cameron Stadium, Durham, NC (February 7, 1976)
No.	Title	Length
6.	"Traveling (Hejira)"	6:36

1976 Tour of the United States: Live at Music Hall, Boston, MA (February 19, 1976)
No.	Title	Writer(s)	Length
7.	"Edith and the Kingpin"		3:50
8.	"Talk to Me"		5:10
9.	"Harry's House/Centerpiece"	Mitchell; Harry Edison; Jon Hendricks	5:23
10.	"Intro to Furry Sings the Blues"		1:22
11.	"Furry Sings the Blues"		4:36
12.	"Trouble Child"		3:45
13.	"Rainy Night House"		3:51

1976 Tour of the United States: Live at Duke University, Cameron Stadium, Durham, NC (February 7, 1976)
No.	Title	Length
14.	"Don't Interrupt the Sorrow"	3:53

1976 Tour of the United States: Live at Music Hall, Boston, MA (February 19, 1976)
No.	Title	Writer(s)	Length
15.	"Raised on Robbery"		2:43
16.	"The Jungle Line"		5:30
17.	"Twisted"	Wardell Gray; Annie Ross	4:24

=== Disc three ===
Hejira Demos: A&M Studios, Hollywood, CA (March 1976)
No.	Title	Length
1.	"Furry Sings the Blues"	4:30
2.	"Traveling (Hejira)"	6:07
3.	"Dreamland"	4:53
4.	"Talk to Me"	3:54
5.	"Coyote/Don Juan's Reckless Daughter"	9:41
6.	"Black Crow"	3:57
7.	"Amelia"	4:52
8.	"Blue Motel Room"	3:24
9.	"A Strange Boy"	4:16

Rolling Thunder Revue: Tarrant County Convention Center, Fort Worth, TX (May 16, 1976)
No.	Title	Length
10.	"Black Crow"	3:59
11.	"Intro to Song for Sharon"	0:27
12.	"Song for Sharon"	9:01

Hejira Demos: A&M Studios, Hollywood, CA (Summer 1976)
No.	Title	Length
13.	"Refuge of the Roads" (early mix with horns)	6:29
14.	"Don Juan's Reckless Daughter" (early rough mix)	6:05

=== Disc four ===
Don Juan's Reckless Daughter Sessions: A&M Studios, Hollywood, CA
No.	Title	Length
1.	"Save Magic" ("Paprika Plains" embryonic version)	12:08
2.	"Otis and Marlena" (early rough mix)	4:20

Mingus Sessions: Electric Lady Studios, New York, NY
No.	Title	Writer(s)	Length
3.	"Sweet Sucker Dance" (vocals & drums version – take 5)	Mitchell; Charles Mingus	6:37
4.	"A Chair in the Sky" (early alternate version – take 6)	Mitchell; Mingus	5:14
5.	"Sweet Sucker Dance" (early alternate version)	Mitchell; Mingus	7:00

Live at Bread & Roses Festival: Greek Theatre, Berkeley, CA (September 2 & 3, 1978)
No.	Title	Writer(s)	Length
6.	"Introduction"		1:00
7.	"The Dry Cleaner from Des Moines"	Mitchell; Mingus	2:20
8.	"Intro to A Chair in the Sky"		0:51
9.	"A Chair in the Sky"	Mitchell; Mingus	6:33
10.	"Intro to Goodbye Pork Pie Hat"		0:37
11.	"Goodbye Pork Pie Hat"	Mitchell; Mingus	5:19
12.	"Intro to The Wolf That Lives in Lindsey"		1:07
13.	"The Wolf That Lives in Lindsey"		6:24

Mingus Early Alternate Version: Electric Lady Studios, New York, NY and A&M Studios, Hollywood, CA (1978 & 1979)
No.	Title	Writer(s)	Length
14.	"A Good Suit and a Good Haircut"	Mitchell; Mingus	3:12
15.	"God Must Be a Boogie Man"		3:40
16.	"Solo for Old Fat Girl's Soul"	Mitchell; Mingus	3:33
17.	"The Dry Cleaner from Des Moines"	Mitchell; Mingus	3:35

=== Disc five ===
Mingus Early Alternate Version: Electric Lady Studios, New York, NY and A&M Studios, Hollywood, CA (1978 & 1979)[cont.]
No.	Title	Length
1.	"Sue and the Holy River"	7:09

Mingus Sessions: A&M Studios, Hollywood, CA (1979)
No.	Title	Length
2.	"The Wolf That Lives in Lindsey"	6:18

Live at May 6 Coalition Rally Against Nuclear Power: National Mall, Washington, D.C. (May 6, 1979)
No.	Title	Length
3.	"Introduction – Graham Nash"	0:30
4.	"Big Yellow Taxi"	3:46

1979 Tour Rehearsals: SIR Rehearsal Studios, Los Angeles, CA
No.	Title	Length
5.	"Jericho"	3:11
6.	"Help Me"	3:46

1979 Tour of the United States: Live at Forest Hills Tennis Stadium, Queens, NY (August 25, 1979)
No.	Title	Writer(s)	Length
7.	"Big Yellow Taxi"		3:03
8.	"Just Like This Train"		3:56
9.	"In France They Kiss on Main Street"		3:52
10.	"Coyote"		4:46
11.	"Edith and the Kingpin"		3:52
12.	"Free Man in Paris"		3:11
13.	"Goodbye Pork Pie Hat"	Mitchell; Mingus	5:25
14.	"Jaco's Solo/Third Stone from the Sun"	Jaco Pastorius; Jimi Hendrix	5:48
15.	"The Dry Cleaner from Des Moines"	Mitchell; Mingus	5:24

=== Disc six ===
1979 Tour of the United States: Live at Forest Hills Tennis Stadium, Queens, NY (August 25, 1979)[cont.]
No.	Title	Writer(s)	Length
1.	"Amelia"		6:16
2.	"Pat's Solo"	Pat Metheny	3:08
3.	"Hejira"		6:42
4.	"Don's Solo"	Don Alias	4:24
5.	"Dreamland"		4:39
6.	"Black Crow"		3:39
7.	"Furry Sings the Blues"		5:22
8.	"Intro to God Must Be a Boogie Man"		0:43
9.	"God Must Be a Boogie Man"		4:46
10.	"Raised on Robbery"		4:12
11.	"Shadows and Light"		4:56
12.	"The Last Time I Saw Richard"		4:59
13.	"Why Do Fools Fall in Love"	Frankie Lymon; Herman Santiago; Jimmy Merchant	2:39

1979 Tour of the United States: Live in Philadelphia, Robin Hood Dell West, Philadelphia, PA (August 28, 1979)
No.	Title	Length
14.	"Woodstock"	5:54

1979 Tour of the United States: Live at Greek Theatre, Los Angeles, CA (September 13, 1979)
No.	Title	Writer(s)	Length
15.	"Intro to A Chair in the Sky"		0:48
16.	"A Chair in the Sky"	Mitchell; Mingus	6:43

== Charts ==
Chart performance for Joni Mitchell Archives – Vol. 4: The Asylum Years (1976–1980)
Chart (2024)	Peak position
Belgian Albums (Ultratop Flanders)	82
Scottish Albums (Official Charts)	50
US Top Current Album Sales (Billboard)	44
UK Album Sales (OCC)	38
UK Americana Albums (Official Charts)	6

== Hejira Demos ==
Hejira Demos

Compilation album by Joni Mitchell
- Released: November 29, 2024
- Recorded: March 1976
- Studios: A&M Studios, Hollywood
- Genre: Folk
- Length: 45:34
- Label: Rhino

Joni Mitchell chronology
Joni Mitchell Archives – Vol. 4: The Asylum Years (1976–1980) (2024)	Hejira Demos (2024)

An excerpt of the Joni Mitchell Archives – Vol. 4: The Asylum Years (1976–1980), titled Hejira Demos, was released on November 29, 2024, by Rhino Records. It features material recorded during the first of two different Hejira recording sessions recovered by the archival team, and is the fifteenth overall release and sixth auxiliary release of the Joni Mitchell Archives project. The album was released exclusively on vinyl LP for the 2024 Record Store Day Black Friday event.

=== Track listing ===
All tracks are written by Joni Mitchell.

Side one
No.	Title	Length
1.	"Coyote/Don Juan's Reckless Daughter"	9:41
2.	"Amelia"	4:51
3.	"Furry Sings the Blues"	4:30
4.	"A Strange Boy"	4:16

Side two
No.	Title	Length
1.	"Traveling (Hejira)"	6:07
2.	"Black Crow"	3:57
3.	"Blue Motel Room"	3:23
4.	"Dreamland"	4:52
5.	"Talk to Me"	3:54
