= The Cabin Kids =

Musical group

The Cabin Kids were a juvenile, African American vocal group. They performed on radio, stage, and screen, in Our Gang comedies and other movies. They were also featured in advertisements.

== Career ==
The troupe was originally known as the Jolly Six Sextette. After one of the girls dropped out, the remaining five became known as The Cabin Kids. Four were the stepchildren of James and Beatrice Hall of Asheville, North Carolina: featured singer Winifred Hall (born 1928), Helen Hall (born 1924), James Hall, Jr. (born 1926), and shaven-headed Frederick Hall (born 1929). Ruth Gamble (born 1924), was the daughter of Mrs. Flora Gamble of Asheville.

All five kids had stage nicknames. In descending order of age, Ruth was Sweetie, Helen was Precious, James was Darling, Winifred was Sugar, and Fred was Honey. Honey scratching his scalp became a hallmark of their act; during the song "Little Liza (I Love You)", the featured singer Sugar would repeatedly chant "Honey!" and kiss her little brother on his shaven head.

The Cabin Kids first appeared on radio over local station WWNC in Asheville. Rudy Vallee invited them to make a guest appearance on his national radio hour over NBC. Paramount Pictures brought the family to Hollywood for the Bing Crosby-W. C. Fields feature film Mississippi (1935). While in the movie capital, The Cabin Kids made specialty appearances in two Our Gang shorts for comedy producer Hal Roach: Beginner's Luck and Teacher's Beau (both 1935).

Immediately after their movie work, they returned to their home at 1360 George St. in Plainfield, New Jersey. Shortly afterward, they were playing regional vaudeville theaters with a 10-minute act. Variety caught their performance in Baltimore: "To put it bluntly, their vaudeville appearance is quite a letdown coming on heels of what they did in the Bing Crosby starrer. The kids are probably much better adapted to pix than stage. On the celluloid their amazingly unaffected manner can be caught much more effectively. They lose their necessary intimacy in a 3,000-seat house like the Century, and that mitigates against their chances. A girl of perhaps 18 is along in act, accompanying at piano."

When Paramount wanted to shoot retakes for Mississippi, the kids, now with other commitments, couldn't make a second trip. The studio hired five local show-business kids to stand in for them: Dorothy Dandridge, Jannie Hoskins (sister of Our Gang's Allen "Farina" Hoskins), Donald Goff, Dorothy Jones, and Calvin Sneed.

A movie talent scout liked The Cabin Kids and hired them for 10-minute musical shorts, to be released by Educational Pictures. The kids remained with Educational's New York studio until the end of 1937, when the studio ceased production. Mrs. Hall estimated that The Cabin Kids appeared in 54 movies.

Showman Billy Rose hired them for his Broadway show Jumbo and his Texas dinner theater Casa Mañana. Helen Hall remembered that during the Jumbo run, they were pulled off the stage in the middle of their act, because they were underaged. In the same vein, she added that many theaters across America wanted to book The Cabin Kids so eagerly that the managers willingly paid fines for having juveniles in stage performances.

Naomi Burns of Columbus, Ohio traveled with the troupe as a tutor, but Mrs. Hall explained, "It's almost time those two older girls and the oldest boy should enter college. After this trip I am going to put them in school and get them ready. It's about time they started getting a good college preparatory education." The two youngest, Winifred and Fred, also continued their education and graduated from Plainville High School in their home town.

== Later years ==
Eldest son James joined the U. S. Army and was discharged in 1945. Fred joined the U. S. Navy in August 1945 and was stationed in Seattle, Washington. Neither brother had any desire to return to show business. Meanwhile Winifred, Helen, and Ruth -- now in their late teens to early twenties -- called their singing act The Three Cabin Girls and played nightclubs in Chicago, Detroit, and Washington, D. C.

== Partial filmography ==
- Mississippi (1935, film debut, with Bing Crosby and W. C. Fields)
- Beginner's Luck (1935 short, with Our Gang)
- Teacher's Beau (1935 short, with Our Gang)
- The Life of the Party (1935, short)
- Radio Rascals (1935, short)
- College Capers (1935, short)
- Way Out West (1935, short)
- Easy Picken's (1935, short)
- Hooray for Love (1935, with Gene Raymond and Ann Sothern)
- Spooks (1936, short)
- Pink Lemonade (1936, short)
- Way Down Yonder (1936, short)
- Gifts in Rhythm (1936, short)
- Rhythm Saves the Day (1937, short)
- Git Along Little Dogies (1937, with Gene Autry)
- Round-Up Time in Texas (1937, with Gene Autry)
- Trailer Paradise (1937, short)
- All's Fair (1938, short)
