= The Asylum Albums (1976–1980) =

Box set by Joni Mitchell
- Released: June 21, 2024
- Recorded: 1975–1980
- Venues: Shadows and Light; Santa Barbara Bowl (Santa Barbara, California)
- Studios: Hejira, Don Juan's Reckless Daughter, and Mingus; A&M (Hollywood, California); Don Juan's Reckless Daughter; Columbia 30th Street Studio (New York City, New York); Basing Street Studios (London, United Kingdom); Mingus; Electric Lady Studios (New York City, New York)
- Label: Rhino

Joni Mitchell chronology
Court and Spark Demos (2023)	The Asylum Albums (1976–1980) (2024)	Joni Mitchell Archives – Vol. 4: The Asylum Years (1976–1980) (2024)

The Asylum Albums (1976–1980) is a five-disc box set by Canadian singer-songwriter Joni Mitchell, released on June 21, 2024, by Rhino Records. The set is the thirteenth overall release and third box set of remastered albums from the Joni Mitchell Archives, a planned series of releases featuring remastered and unreleased material from the singer's personal archives. Formatted in chronological order, the third volume of the remaster series includes the latter half of Mitchell's albums released on Asylum Records: Hejira (1976), Don Juan's Reckless Daughter (1977), Mingus (1979), and Shadows and Light (1980). The albums are presented with their original cover designs except for Don Juan which uses the revised cover image replacing the original controversial image. The box set contains inner liner notes written by Meryl Streep.

== Track listing ==
All tracks are written by Joni Mitchell, except where noted.

=== Disc 1 – Hejira (1976) ===
No.	Title	Length
1.	"Coyote"	5:00
2.	"Amelia"	6:00
3.	"Furry Sings the Blues"	5:03
4.	"A Strange Boy"	4:15
5.	"Hejira"	6:35
6.	"Song for Sharon"	8:30
7.	"Black Crow"	4:20
8.	"Blue Motel Room"	5:03
9.	"Refuge of the Roads"	6:37

=== Disc 2 – Don Juan's Reckless Daughter (1977) ===
No.	Title	Writer(s)	Length
1.	"Overture – Cotton Avenue"		6:35
2.	"Talk to Me"		3:40
3.	"Jericho"		3:25
4.	"Paprika Plains"		16:19
5.	"Otis and Marlena"		4:05
6.	"The Tenth World"	Joni Mitchell; Don Alias; Manolo Badrena; Alex Acuña; Airto Moreira; Jaco Pastorius	6:45
7.	"Dreamland"		4:37
8.	"Don Juan's Reckless Daughter"		6:40
9.	"Off Night Backstreet"		3:22
10.	"The Silky Veils of Ardor"		4:02

=== Disc 3 – Mingus (1979) ===
No.	Title	Lyrics	Music	Length
1.	"Happy Birthday 1975" (Rap)	—	Mildred J. Hill	0:57
2.	"God Must Be a Boogie Man"			4:33
3.	"Funeral" (Rap)	—	—	1:07
4.	"A Chair in the Sky"		Charles Mingus	6:40
5.	"The Wolf That Lives in Lindsey"			6:33
6.	"I's a Muggin'" (Rap)	Stuff Smith	Smith	0:07
7.	"Sweet Sucker Dance"		Mingus	8:06
8.	"Coin in the Pocket" (Rap)	—	—	0:11
9.	"The Dry Cleaner from Des Moines"		Mingus	3:22
10.	"Lucky" (Rap)	—	—	0:03
11.	"Goodbye Pork Pie Hat"		Mingus	5:41

=== Disc 4 – Shadows and Light (1980) ===
Digital edition
No.	Title	Writer(s)	Length
1.	"Introduction" (Live at the Santa Barbara County Bowl; September 9, 1979)		1:51
2.	"In France They Kiss on Main Street" (Live at the Santa Barbara County Bowl; September 9, 1979)		4:14
3.	"Edith and the Kingpin" (Live at the Santa Barbara County Bowl; September 9, 1979)		4:10
4.	"Coyote" (Live at the Santa Barbara County Bowl; September 9, 1979)		4:58
5.	"Goodbye Pork Pie Hat" (Live at the Santa Barbara County Bowl; September 9, 1979)	Mitchell; Mingus	6:02
6.	"The Dry Cleaner from Des Moines" (Live at the Santa Barbara County Bowl; September 9, 1979)	Mitchell; Mingus	4:37
7.	"Amelia" (Live at the Santa Barbara County Bowl; September 9, 1979)		6:40
8.	"Pat's Solo" (Live at the Santa Barbara County Bowl; September 9, 1979)	Pat Metheny	3:09
9.	"Hejira" (Live at the Santa Barbara County Bowl; September 9, 1979)		7:42
10.	"Black Crow" (Live at the Santa Barbara County Bowl; September 9, 1979)		3:52
11.	"Don's Solo" (Live at the Santa Barbara County Bowl; September 9, 1979)	Alias	4:04
12.	"Dreamland" (Live at the Santa Barbara County Bowl; September 9, 1979)		4:40
13.	"Free Man in Paris" (Live at the Santa Barbara County Bowl; September 9, 1979)		3:23
14.	"Band Introduction" (Live at the Santa Barbara County Bowl; September 9, 1979)		0:52
15.	"Furry Sings the Blues" (Live at the Santa Barbara County Bowl; September 9, 1979)		5:14
16.	"Why Do Fools Fall in Love" (Live at the Santa Barbara County Bowl; September 9, 1979)	Frankie Lymon; Herman Santiago; Jimmy Merchant	2:53
17.	"Shadows and Light" (Live at the Santa Barbara County Bowl; September 9, 1979)		5:23
18.	"God Must Be a Boogie Man" (Live at the Santa Barbara County Bowl; September 9, 1979)		5:02
19.	"Woodstock" (Live at the Santa Barbara County Bowl; September 9, 1979)		5:08

== Charts ==
Chart performance for The Asylum Albums (1976–1980)
Chart (2024)	Peak position
Hungarian Physical Albums (MAHASZ)	16
Scottish Albums (Official Charts)	30
UK Album Sales Chart (OCC)	21
US Top Current Album Sales (Billboard)	40
