= Michael Brooks (music historian) =

American historian (1935–2020)

Michael Brooks (1935 – November 20, 2020) was a British-born music historian, archivist, consultant, and producer.

== Biography ==
Brooks was born in Tooting, London, and moved to New York City in 1966. He began his music career in 1971, assisting and producing records with John Hammond of Columbia Records. This collaboration resulted in many reissues of jazz, pop, big band, and country music artifacts, currently on the Legacy Recordings label. In later life Brooks worked at Sony Music Entertainment as a consultant.

He died in November 2020, aged 85.

== Discography ==
Brooks' credits on many various projects include the following:

=== Producer ===
- Duke Ellington: The Essential Duke Ellington
- Duke Ellington: Piano in the Background
- Duke Ellington: Festival Session
- Duke Ellington: Masterpieces by Ellington (Bonus Tracks)
- Duke Ellington: OKeh Ellington
- Duke Ellington: Blues in Orbit (Bonus Tracks)
- Duke Ellington: Piano in the Foreground (Bonus Tracks)
- Louis Armstrong: Essential Louis Armstrong
- Louis Armstrong: Hot Fives, Vol. 1
- Louis Armstrong: Hot Fives & Hot Sevens, Vol. 2
- Billie Holiday: Billie Holiday Collection, Vol. 1
- Billie Holiday: Billie Holiday Collection, Vol. 2
- Billie Holiday: Billie Holiday Collection, Vol. 4
- Billie Holiday: Love Songs, Vol. 2
- Billie Holiday: Blue Billie (Columbia)
- Billie Holiday: Lady Day Swings!
- Lester Young: Evening of a Basie-ite PREZ
- Cab Calloway: Cab Calloway (Featuring Chu Berry)
- Bix Beiderbecke: Vol. 1: Singin' the Blues
- Charlie Christian: Genius of the Electric Guitar (Columbia Box Set)
- Benny Goodman: The Essential Benny Goodman (Bluebird/Legacy)
- Tommy Dorsey: The Sentimental Gentleman of Swing: Centennial Collection
- Various Artists: PROGRESSIONS: 100 Years Of Jazz Guitars
- Various Artists: Art Deco: The Crooners
- Various Artists: Real Kansas City
- Various Artists: Now That's Chicago!
- Various Artists: Stars of the Apollo
- Various Artists: Little Club Jazz: Small Groups in the 30s (New World Records)

=== Liner Notes ===
- Billie Holiday: Billie Holiday Collection, Vol. 1
- Billie Holiday: Billie Holiday Collection, Vol. 2
- Billie Holiday: Billie Holiday Collection, Vol. 3
- Billie Holiday: Billie Holiday Collection, Vol. 4
- Lester Young: Evening of a Basie-ite PREZ
- Bix Beiderbecke: Vol. 1: Singin' the Blues
- Various Artists: Art Deco: The Crooners
- Various Artists: This Is Art Deco
- Various Artists: Now That's Chicago!
- Various Artists: Swing Time! The Fabulous Big Band Era 1925–1955

Brooks' world music projects include the Sony Legacy reissue "Cuban Music: 1909-1951" and the Yiddish compilation "From Avenue A to the Great White Way." He also specialized in identifying obscure pre-1950 recordings and served as the project manager on the 19-hour PBS Ken Burns Presents Jazz compilation series of 22 single-discs, as well as a five-disc box set historical summary.

== Awards ==
Brooks has been nominated for Grammy awards 16 times. His Grammy awards wins include:

- 1978: Historical Reissue, The Lester Young Story, Vol. 3
- 1978: Album Notes, A Bing Crosby Collection, Volumes 1 and 2
- 1979: Historical Reissue, Billie Holiday, Giants of Jazz
- 1981: Historical Reissue, Hoagy Carmichael, From Stardust to Ole Buttermilk Sky
- 2001: Historical Reissue, Louis Armstrong, The Complete Hot Five and Hot Seven Recordings
- 2002: Historical Reissue, Lady Day: The Complete Billie Holiday on Columbia 1933-1944

== Sources ==
- http://www.grammy.com
- http://www.legacyrecordings.com/
- http://www.legacyrecordings.com/Billie-Holiday/Lady-Day-The-Complete-Billie-Holiday-On-Columbia-1933-1944.aspx
- https://web.archive.org/web/20080416231035/http://www.allaboutjazz.com/artists/jhammond.htm
- https://web.archive.org/web/20050122004115/http://www.allaboutjazz.com/php/news.php?id=1488
- http://www.organissimo.org/forum/index.php?showtopic=11283
