= Christian Zwarg =

German mastering engineer

Christian "Chris" Zwarg is a German mastering engineer, born September 12, 1968, in Salzgitter (Niedersachsen, West Germany).

== Career ==
Christian Zwarg is an engineer at Truesound Transfers in Berlin-Reinickendorf, Germany, as well as the owner of the company. He specializes in audio restoration.

== Awards and nominations ==
Zwarg has received four Grammy nominations for Best Historical Album throughout his career. At the 61st Annual Grammy Awards in 2019, he is nominated twice in the same category. He is nominated for mastering At the Louisiana Hayride Tonight... and Battleground Korea: Songs and Sounds of America's Forgotten War.
