= Pumpkin Center, Cherokee County, Oklahoma =

Pumpkin Center
- Unincorporated community
- Location within the state of Oklahoma Pumpkin Center (the United States)
- Coordinates: 35°42′46″N 95°07′38″W
- Country: United States
- State: Oklahoma
- County: Cherokee
- Elevation: 659 ft (201 m)
- Time zone: UTC-6 (Central (CST))
  - Summer (DST): UTC-5 (CDT)
- ZIP codes: 74451
- GNIS feature ID: 1100768

Pumpkin Center is an unincorporated community in Cherokee County, Oklahoma, United States. It is approximately 7.5 miles northeast of Braggs.

This should not be confused with the Pumpkin Center located in Comanche County, Oklahoma, which is about 10 miles east of Lawton; with the Pumpkin Center located in Muskogee County, Oklahoma, which is about 14 miles east of the city of Muskogee; or with the Pumpkin Center located in Okmulgee County, Oklahoma, which is approximately 10 miles northeast of the city of Okmulgee. It should also not be confused with Pumpkin Hollow, located elsewhere in Cherokee County.

No information appears on the origins of the name; however, "Pumpkin Center" as a town name was widely publicized by one Cal Stewart, who was a popular spoken-word recording artist in the late 1890s and early 1900s. He frequently played the character of a gullible individual by the name of Uncle Josh Weathersby, who hailed from the fictional town of "Pumpkin Center" or "Punkin Center". The recordings described life in Pumpkin Center, as well as the character’s collisions with modernity in New York City. Perhaps as a result, there are at least 31 communities in the U.S. named Pumpkin Center scattered across 16 states, including Alabama (3), Arizona (2), California (2), Florida, Georgia, Indiana (2), Kentucky, Louisiana, Maryland, Missouri (2), Mississippi, North Carolina (3), Oklahoma (4), South Dakota, Tennessee (3) and Virginia (2).
