= Pumpkin Center, Comanche County, Oklahoma =

Unincorporated community in Oklahoma, US

Pumpkin Center, Oklahoma
- Unincorporated community
- Location within the state of Oklahoma Pumpkin Center (the United States)
- Coordinates: 34°35′38″N 98°12′43″W
- Country: United States
- State: Oklahoma
- County: Comanche
- Elevation: 1,161 ft (354 m)
- Time zone: UTC-6 (Central (CST))
  - Summer (DST): UTC-5 (CDT)
- FIPS code: 40-61050
- GNIS feature ID: 1096955

Pumpkin Center is an unincorporated community in Comanche County, Oklahoma, United States. It is located at the intersection of state highways 7 and 65, approximately 10 miles east of Lawton in the southwestern portion of the state.

This is not to be confused with the Pumpkin Center located in Okmulgee County, Oklahoma which is about 10 miles northeast of the city of Okmulgee, or with the Pumpkin Center located in Muskogee County, Oklahoma, which is about 14 miles east of the city of Muskogee, or with the Pumpkin Center located in Cherokee County, Oklahoma which is about 7.5 miles northeast of Braggs.

The origins of the name of the town are not known, and many theories exist. One story has it that an old man's pickup truck carrying pumpkins to market broke down in the area, and he had to sell the pumpkins to passing motorists to pay for the mechanic's bill. However, “Pumpkin Center” as a town name was widely publicized by one Cal Stewart, who was a popular spoken-word recording artist in the late 1890s and early 1900s. He frequently played the character of a gullible individual by the name of Uncle Josh Weathersby who hailed from the fictional town of "Pumpkin Center" or "Punkin Center". The recordings described life in Pumpkin Center, as well as the character's collisions with modernity in New York City. Perhaps as a result, there are at least 31 communities in the U.S. named Pumpkin Center scattered across 16 states, including Alabama (3), Arizona (2), California (2), Florida, Georgia, Indiana (2), Kentucky, Louisiana, Maryland, Missouri (2), Mississippi, North Carolina (3), Oklahoma (4), South Dakota, Tennessee (3) and Virginia (2).
