= Actionable Offenses: Indecent Phonograph Recordings from the 1890s =

Compilation album by Various Artists
- Released: 2007
- Recorded: ca. 1892–1900
- Genre: Spoken word
- Length: 59:16
- Label: Archeophone Records
- Producers: David Giovannoni, Meagan Hennessey, Richard Martin

Actionable Offenses: Indecent Phonograph Recordings from the 1890s is a compilation of jokes and stories recorded to wax cylinders during the 1890s. At the time the recordings were made, they were considered indecent, and nearly all similar recordings from this era have been destroyed, often by law. The compilation was assembled by Patrick Feaster and David Giovannoni, and released on Archeophone Records, an archival reissue label, in 2007. It received two Grammy Award nominations.

== Historical background ==
By the 1890s, phonograph machines became common in public places, and were found in American cities at county fairs, public halls, saloons, and department stores. In many places, such as bars and taverns, patrons could place money into a coin slot and choose a recording to listen to, like a jukebox. Some establishments began placing cylinders of a sexually explicit nature into their machines during this decade, and local authorities often took steps to remove the cylinders from use and charge those responsible under indecency statutes. In New York City, Anthony Comstock and his Society for the Suppression of Vice spent several years investigating cases of indecent material in phonograph booths throughout the city. In 1899, Comstock succeeded in pushing through a statute specifically criminalizing the distribution and airing, public or private, of recorded material which used profanity or sexually explicit language; as a result, most of those in the business of making such records ceased to do so after 1900.

In addition to commercial recordings, the advent of home recording also allowed for the creation of obscene or sexually explicit recordings. Such machines were available by the 1890s, and the ability to use the machine to record such material was actually used as a selling point by some purveyors of home recording machines.

== Assembly of the compilation ==
The recordings on the album comprise two collections of cylinders: the Walter Miller Collection and the Bruce R. Young Collection. The Walter Miller Collection was compiled by the manager of Thomas Edison's commercial apparatus until 1937, and his collection of commercial recordings was preserved by the Edison National Historic Site from the 1950s. The latter collection was purchased by a collector in 1997, and consisted of what are probably home recordings. Both of the collections are presented in their entirety on the compilation; tracks 1–14 are the Miller Collection and tracks 15–43 are the Young collection. The Miller Collection was digitized in November 2006.

== Performers ==
=== Cal Stewart ===
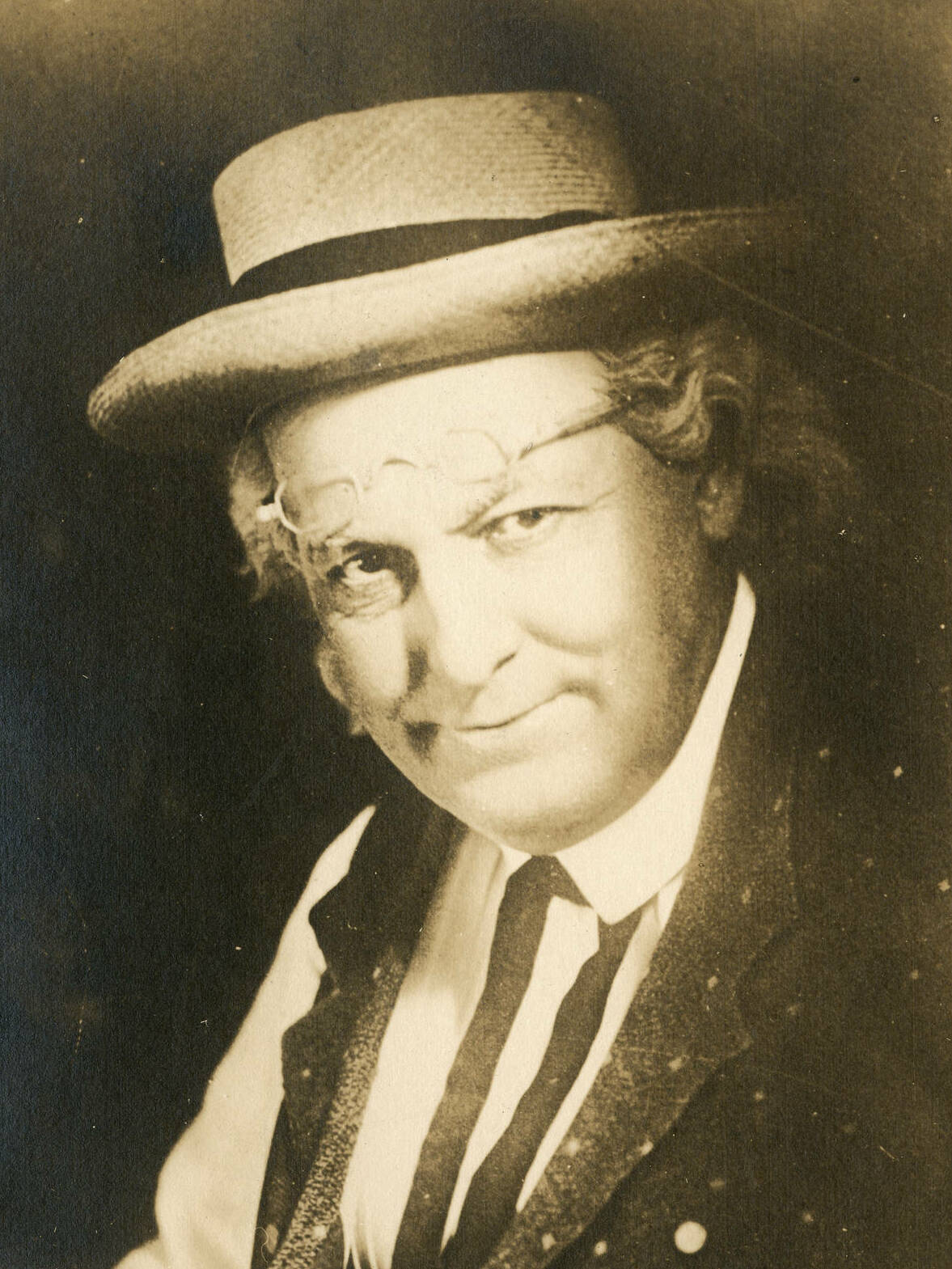
Cal Stewart in 1912

Cal Stewart (c. 1856 – 1919) began his career in vaudeville after injuring his hand and foot working on a railroad. By 1895 he was performing in New York City at the Union Square Theatre, and in 1897 he made his first phonograph recordings. Stewart was best known for his monologues depicting stereotypical "rubes" and "Yankees". Working extensively as a performer and recorder up to the time of his death in 1919, he became a nationally celebrated humorist. The curators of the collection identified Stewart as the most likely performer of the first two tracks of the disc.

=== Russell Hunting ===
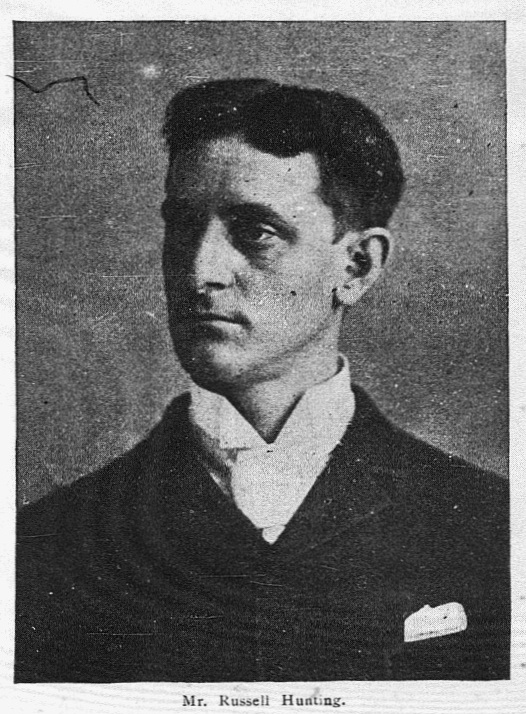

Russell Hunting (1864–1943) worked as a stage manager for a Boston theater, and from the early 1890s recorded comedy routines centering on stereotypical Irish Americans. His recurring character "Michael Casey" became a centerpiece of his comedy and was widely imitated. Hunting was actually arrested by Anthony Comstock in June 1896, and served three months in prison as a result; he returned to the recording business upon his release, but emigrated to England in 1898. There he continued using the Casey routines to great success and worked as a recording executive. The curators of the collection identified Hunting as the most likely performer of tracks 3–11.

=== James H. White ===
James H. White (1872–1944) was the manager of the motion picture wing of Thomas Edison's business from 1896 to 1903. Concomitantly, he took over the recording of the "Michael Casey" sketches after Hunting was arrested. After 1903 White moved to England and managed portions of Edison's businesses there. The curators of the collection identified White as the most likely performer of tracks 12–14.

== Critical reception ==
Archeophone Records issued the compilation to CD in 2007 with extensively researched liner notes. The New York Times noted the compilation's historical importance and noted that the jokes "still kill" more than 100 years after being recorded. NPR noted that the compilation was "as lewd and often obscene as anything Howard Stern has to offer." Metro noted in jest, "Some of this material would get you arrested, even today". The compilation was nominated for two Grammy Awards, for Best Album Notes and Best Historical Album.

== Track listing ==
Believed to be by Cal Stewart

- 1. "Learning a City Gal How to Milk"
- 2. "The Tapeworm Story"

By an Unknown Performer, Possibly Russell Hunting

- 3–4. "Gimlet's Soliloquy/The Rascal Detector" (by "Manly Tempest")
- 5. "The Whore's Union"
- 6–7. "Boarding the Folsom/A Few Conundrums"

Believed to Be By Russell Hunting

- 8. "Out of Order" (by "Charley Smith of Kankakee")
- 9. "Did He Charge Too Much"
- 10. "Reilly as a Policeman" (by "Charley Smith of New York City")
- 11. "Slim Hadley on a Racket" (by "Willy Fathand of New York City")

Believed to Be By James White

- 12. "Slim Hadley on a Racket" (by "Willy Brown")
- 13. "Michael Casey Exhibiting His Panorama" (by "Willy Smith")
- 14. "Dennis Reilly at Maggie Murphy's Home After Nine O'Clock" (by "Willy Brown")

By an Unknown Performer, Probably Home Recordings

- 15–16. Young Cylinder A: "Stroll on Capitol Hill/A Hard Head"
- 17. Young Cylinder B: "The Virtues of Raw Oysters"
- 18–25. Young Cylinder C: "Jokes, Riddles, Verses, a Limerick, and a Toast"
- 26–34. Young Cylinder D: "More Verses and Jokes"
- 35–38. Young Cylinder E: "The Lady's Friend/A Song/The Irishman's Prayer/A Joke"
- 39–42. Young Cylinder F: "Verses and Songs"
- 43. Young Cylinder G: Poem: "I Sit Here, Thinking, Will, of You"
