= Pumpkin Center, Muskogee County, Oklahoma =

Pumpkin Center, Oklahoma
- Unincorporated community
- Location within Oklahoma Location within the United States
- Coordinates: 35°42′46″N 95°7′38″W
- Country: United States
- State: Oklahoma
- County: Muskogee
- Elevation: 597 ft (182 m)
- Time zone: UTC-6 (Central (CST))
  - Summer (DST): UTC-5 (CDT)
- GNIS feature ID: 1100769

Pumpkin Center is an unincorporated community in Muskogee County, Oklahoma, United States. It is about 14 miles east of the city of Muskogee.

This is not to be confused with the Pumpkin Center located in Okmulgee County, Oklahoma which is about 10 miles northeast of the city of Okmulgee, or with the Pumpkin Center located in Comanche County, Oklahoma which is about 10 miles east of Lawton, or with the Pumpkin Center located in Cherokee County, Oklahoma which is about 7.5 miles northeast of Braggs.

No information appears on the origins of the name; however, “Pumpkin Center” as a town name was widely publicized by one Cal Stewart, who was a popular spoken-word recording artist in the late 1890s and early 1900s. He frequently played the character of a gullible individual by the name of Uncle Josh Weathersby who hailed from the fictional town of "Pumpkin Center" or "Punkin Center". The recordings described life in Pumpkin Center, as well as the character’s collisions with modernity in New York City.
