= Jerry Korn =

American pilot and author (1921–2010)

Gerald "Jerry" Edward Korn (January 25, 1921, in West Roxbury, Massachusetts – October 16, 2010, in Parsonsfield, Maine, US) was a pilot and author. He was married to Barbara Henderson Korn and they have three daughters.

== Early life ==
Upon graduation from Roxbury Memorial High School, Korn studied journalism at Boston University. He left to become a reporter for the Boston Globe at Fort Devens in Ayer, Massachusetts.

== Military career ==
Korn was awarded the Distinguished Flying Cross as a B-24 co-pilot in World War II with the Eighth Air Force. He flew a total of 35 combat missions. Before his discharge in September 1945 he flew experimental flights out of Bedford, Massachusetts, for radar testing.

== Post-war ==
After leaving the USAAF he became a reporter for the Associated Press progressing to become an editor for Collier's and Life magazines. In 1961 he moved to Time-Life Books first as an assistant text editor then he served for 12 years as the managing editor until 1982.

He is the author of many books including:

- The Atom, the Core of All Matter (1959)
- Raising of the Queen (1962)
- War on the Mississippi (1985, part of Time-Life Book Inc.'s series The Civil War)
- The Fight for Chattanooga: Chickamauga to Missionary Ridge (1985, part of Time-Life Book Inc.'s series The Civil War)
- Pursuit to Appomattox: The Last Battles (1987, part of Time-Life Book Inc.'s series The Civil War)
