= John Pfeiffer (music producer) =

American record producer (1920–1996)

John Pfeiffer (September 29, 1920 – February 8, 1996) was a classical recording producer, a design engineer, and an occasional electronic music composer.

== Life and career ==
Born in Tucson, Arizona, Pfeiffer studied music and engineering at the University of Arizona and Bethany College in Lindsborg, Kansas. After naval service in World War II, he moved to New York, where he attended Columbia University and worked as a jazz pianist before joining RCA Victor as a design engineer in 1949. Pfeiffer was best known as a producer of classical music on RCA Victor's Red Seal label. His reissues of the complete recordings of Arturo Toscanini, Sergei Rachmaninoff and Jascha Heifetz during the 1980s and '90s were critically praised and won several awards. The Heifetz Collection received a Grammy Award in the historical category. Pfeiffer also recorded contemporary artists, including the mezzo-sopranos Marilyn Horne and Frederica von Stade, and Xiang-Dong Kong, a young Chinese pianist. Pfeiffer also produced recordings by the pianists Vladimir Horowitz, Arthur Rubinstein and Van Cliburn, the harpsichordist Wanda Landowska, and the soprano Leontyne Price. In addition to Toscanini, Pfeiffer worked with Fritz Reiner, Leopold Stokowski, Eugene Ormandy and Charles Munch, and produced several of the iconic "Living Stereo" Red Seal recordings.

In addition to his recording work, Mr. Pfeiffer was the audio producer for several televised classical music programs, including "Heifetz on Television," for CBS; "Horowitz Live," for NBC; the 1978 White House concert by Horowitz, the cellist Mstislav Rostropovich and the soprano Leontyne Price, as well as installments of "Live From Lincoln Center" and "Live From The Met."

Pfeiffer helped RCA Victor develop stereo and quadraphonic recording techniques and coordinate the company's adoption of digital recording.

Pheiffer was also a composer and recorded an LP of electronic music called Electronomusic--Nine Images which was released on the RCA Victrola label in 1968 and has since become a collector's item. The individual tracks on the record are labelled "Warm-Up, Canon, and Peace, For Inharmonic Side-Band", "Reflection of a String, For Contraformer", "Drops, For Programmer and Sines", "Moments, Events for Parametric Blocks", "Take Off, For Metric Transperformer", "Forests, Modes for Alphormer and Set". "Pavone, A Duotonic Transform", "Orders, For Sequential Sines", and "After Hours, For Ordered Simpliformer". Pfeiffer in his liner notes explains that "the names [he has] applied to the 'instrumentation' of these works are shorthand descriptions of the technical methods of producing the various sounds". He describes his approach as "one which balances liberation with orientation--head-in-the-stars-feet-on-the-ground idea," declaring that "the concept of holding onto some familiar feature of musical orientation while exploring totally new ideas in other features is the basic aesthetic of 'electronomusic'."

In 1996, Pfeiffer died in New York City from a heart attack at the age of 75.

== Partial discography ==
- Electronomusic — 9 Images, RCA Victrola LP, 1968
- A Salute to American Music, RCA Victor Red Seal CD, 1992

== Tribute albums ==
- The Age of Living Stereo: A Tribute to John Pfeiffer - Martial Singher (Performer), Ludwig van Beethoven (Composer), Hector Berlioz (Composer), Johannes Brahms (Composer), Claude Debussy (Composer), Leo Delibes (Composer), Morton Gould (Composer), Franz Liszt (Composer), Felix Mendelssohn (Composer), Jacques Offenbach (Composer), Camille Saint-Saëns (Composer), Richard Strauss (Composer), Pyotr Il'yich Tchaikovsky (Composer), Arthur Fiedler (Conductor), Charles Münch (Conductor), Fritz Reiner (Conductor), G. Wallace Woodworth (Conductor), Kiril Kondrashin (Conductor), Leopold Stokowski (Conductor), Pierre Monteux (Conductor)
