= Punkin Center =

Punkin Center can refer to some places in the United States:

- Punkin Center, Arizona
- Punkin Center, Colorado
- Haynesville, Texas, also known as Punkin Center

== See also ==
- Pumpkin Center (disambiguation)
