= Pumpkin Center, Dallas County, Missouri =

Extinct hamlet in Missouri, U.S.

Coordinates: 37°44′42″N 93°04′15″W

Pumpkin Center is located in Grant Township, Dallas County, Missouri. It is in the Missouri Ozarks at an elevation of 1,130 feet, near the intersection of Missouri Route 64 and Missouri Route 73 off Pumpkin Center Drive. It is approximately 7 miles north-northeast of Buffalo, the Dallas County seat, and about 26 miles west-northwest of Lebanon.
