= Cal Stewart =

American comedian (1856–1919)

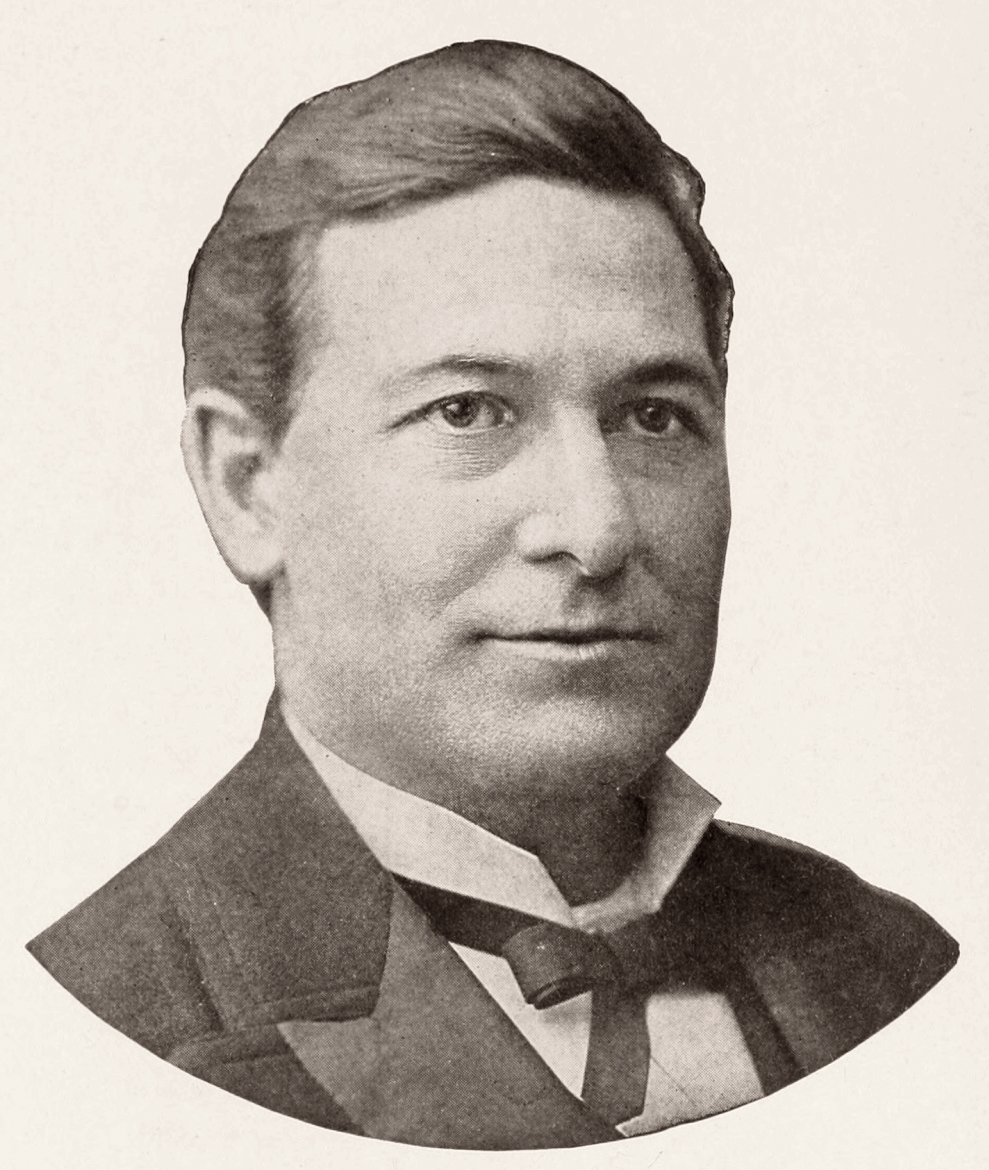
- C. 1905 portrait of Stewart from "Uncle Josh's Punkin Centre Stories"
- Born: 1856; Charlotte County, Virginia
- Died: December 7, 1919 (aged 62–63)
- Notable work: Uncle Josh Weathersby

Comedy career
- Medium: Vaudeville, audio recordings
- Genres: Anecdotal comedy, character comedy

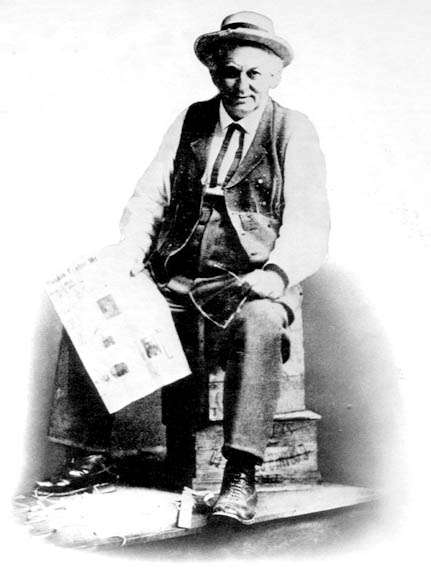
Cal Stewart as Uncle Josh Weathersby, circa 1900

Uncle Josh and the Insurance Company
Performed by Cal Stewart in 1904

Cal Stewart (b. 1856 Charlotte County, Virginia, d. December 7, 1919) was an American comedian and humorist who pioneered in vaudeville and early sound recordings. He is best remembered for his comic monologues in which he played "Uncle Josh Weathersby", a resident of a mythical New England farming town called "Pumpkin Center" or "Punkin Center".

== Biography ==
Born in Charlotte County, Virginia in 1856, he spent his early days working on the railroad with show business as a side business. After losing a finger and two toes in an accident, he quit the railroad and focused on show business. By 1897 Stewart was recording for Berliner Gramophone. He further developed the character of Uncle Josh and the other citizens of Pumpkin Center on his recordings. He wrote the song "Ticklish Reuben" in 1900. Stewart continued recording, for Edison Records, Columbia Records, the Victor Talking Machine Company, and others up until his death on December 7, 1919. He also wrote two books based on his monologues and performed in theaters across America with his wife Rossini Vrionides and her brother and sister. He is buried in Fairview Cemetery in Tipton, Indiana. Stewart is represented on the 2007 compilation Actionable Offenses: Indecent Phonograph Recordings from the 1890s and The Indestructible Uncle Josh. One his many renditions of the Uncle Josh and the Insurance Company routine was added to the National Recording Registry in 2006.

== Legacy ==
The degree of his popularization of “Pumpkin Center” as a town name is suggested by the fact that there are at least 31 communities in the U.S. named Pumpkin Center scattered across 16 states, including Alabama (3), Arizona (2), California (2), Florida, Georgia, Indiana (2), Kentucky, Louisiana, Maryland, Missouri (2), Mississippi, North Carolina (3), Oklahoma (4), South Dakota, Tennessee (3) and Virginia (2).
