= Norah Jones discography =

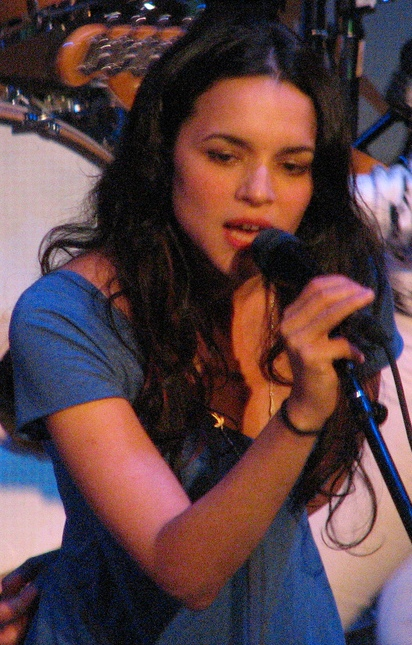
- Studio albums: 9
- Extended plays: 5
- Compilation albums: 4
- Singles: 23
- Video albums: 3
- Collaborative studio albums: 7

American singer and songwriter Norah Jones has released nine solo studio albums, seven collaborative studio albums, 4 compilation albums, five extended plays, 23 singles, and three live DVDs on Blue Note Records. Her most recent studio album, Visions, was released on March 8, 2024, through Blue Note Records.

In 2002, Jones released her solo debut Come Away with Me, which was a fusion of jazz with country, blues, folk and pop. It was certified diamond, selling over 27 million copies and produced three commercially released singles. The record earned Jones five Grammy Awards, including the Album of the Year, Record of the Year, and Best New Artist. Her subsequent studio albums—Feels Like Home (2004), Not Too Late (2007), and The Fall (2009) all gained platinum status, selling over a million copies each. They were also generally well received by critics. Jones's fifth studio album, Little Broken Hearts, was released on April 27, 2012; her sixth, Day Breaks, was released on October 7, 2016. Her seventh studio album, Pick Me Up Off the Floor, was released on June 12, 2020. I Dream of Christmas, her eighth studio album and first Christmas album, was released on October 15, 2021.

Norah Jones has sold over 50 million albums worldwide, including over 19 million in the US.

== Albums ==
=== Studio albums ===
Title	Album details	Peak chart positions										Sales	Certifications
Title	Album details	US	AUS	AUT	CAN	FRA	GER	NLD	NZ	SWI	UK	Sales	Certifications
Come Away with Me	Released: February 26, 2002; Label: Blue Note; Formats: CD, digital download, LP	1	1	2	1	1	2	1	1	2	1	US: 11,020,000 (Note: Sales as of October 2014); AUS: 800,000 (Note: Sales as of January 2013); FRA: 1,160,000 (Note: Sales as of February 2014); UK: 2,484,763 (Note: Sales as of September 2016)	RIAA: 12× Platinum; ARIA: 11× Platinum; BPI: 9× Platinum; BVMI: 5× Gold; IFPI AUT: 2× Platinum; IFPI SWI: 3× Platinum; MC: Diamond; NVPI: 2× Platinum; RMNZ: 11× Platinum; SNEP: Diamond
Feels Like Home	Released: February 10, 2004; Label: Blue Note; Formats: CD, digital download, LP	1	2	1	1	1	1	1	1	1	1	US: 4,632,000 (Note: Sales as of May 2012); UK: 1,181,503	RIAA: 4× Platinum; ARIA: 3× Platinum; BPI: 4× Platinum; BVMI: 3× Platinum; IFPI AUT: 3× Platinum; IFPI SWI: 3× Platinum; MC: 4× Platinum; NVPI: Platinum; RMNZ: 3× Platinum; SNEP: 2× Platinum
Not Too Late	Released: January 30, 2007; Label: Blue Note, EMI; Formats: CD, digital download, LP	1	2	1	1	1	1	1	1	1	1	US: 1,580,000 (Note: Sales as of August 2009); UK: 241,970	RIAA: 2× Platinum; ARIA: Platinum; BPI: Gold; BVMI: Platinum; IFPI AUT: 2× Platinum; IFPI SWI: 2× Platinum; MC: 2× Platinum; RMNZ: Gold; SNEP: Platinum
The Fall	Released: November 17, 2009; Label: Blue Note, EMI; Formats: CD, digital download, LP	3	17	3	3	5	3	5	10	1	24	UK: 98,675	RIAA: Platinum; ARIA: Gold; BPI: Gold; BVMI: Gold; IFPI AUT: Gold; MC: Platinum; RMNZ: Gold; SNEP: Platinum
Little Broken Hearts	Released: May 1, 2012; Label: Blue Note, EMI; Formats: CD, digital download, LP	2	5	1	2	2	3	3	11	1	4	US: 448,000 (Note: Sales as of July 2014); UK: 44,090	RIAA: Gold; MC: Gold; SNEP: Gold
Day Breaks	Released: October 7, 2016; Label: Blue Note; Formats: CD, digital download, LP	2	4	2	7	4	3	8	2	1	9		IFPI AUT: Platinum; RMNZ: Gold; SNEP: Gold
Pick Me Up Off the Floor	Released: June 12, 2020; Label: Blue Note; Formats: CD, digital download, LP	87	21	2	65	21	6	16	—	1	47		
I Dream of Christmas	Released: October 15, 2021; Label: Blue Note; Formats: CD, digital download, LP	100	16	6	72	113	35	41	—	20	—		
Visions	Released: March 8, 2024; Label: Blue Note; Formats: CD, digital download, LP	168	—	3	—	12	7	50	38	3	80		
"—" denotes a recording that did not chart or was not released in that territory.

=== Live albums ===
Title	Album details
...'Til We Meet Again (Live)	Released: April 16, 2021; Label: Blue Note; Format: CD, digital download, LP

=== Collaborative studio albums ===
Title	Album details	Peak chart positions									
Title	Album details	US	AUT	BEL	CAN	FRA	GER	NLD	NZ	SWI	UK
New York City (with The Peter Malick Group)	Released: July 8, 2003; Label: Koch, Edel AG; Formats: CD, digital download	54	28	—	—	—	—	32	18	93	80
New York City - The Remix Album (with The Peter Malick Group)	Released: August 10, 2004; Label: Koch; Format:	—	—	—	—	—	—	—	—	—	—
The Chill Album (with The Peter Malick Group)	Released: October 18, 2005; Label: Koch; Format:	—	—	—	—	—	—	—	—	—	—
Rome (with Danger Mouse, Daniele Luppi, and Jack White)	Released: May 16, 2011; Label: Parlophone, EMI, Lex, Third Man; Formats: CD, LP, digital download	11	—	—	15	—	—	—	—	—	20
Here We Go Again: Celebrating the Genius of Ray Charles (with Willie Nelson and Wynton Marsalis)	Released: March 29, 2011; Label: Blue Note; Formats: CD, digital download	—	40	—	—	—	—	—	—	—	—
Foreverly (with Billie Joe Armstrong)	Released: November 25, 2013; Label: Reprise; Formats: CD, LP, digital download	19	29	59	19	176	77	—	—	16	19

=== Compilation albums ===
Title	Album details	Peak chart positions										Certifications
Title	Album details	US	AUT	BEL	CAN	FRA	GER	NLD	NZ	SWI	UK	Certifications
iTunes Originals	Released: February 5, 2010; Label: Blue Note; Formats: Digital download	170	—	—	—	—	—	—	—	—	—	
...Featuring	Released: November 2, 2010; Label: Blue Note, EMI; Formats: CD, digital download, vinyl	29	20	35	20	54	55	57	26	13	128	MC: Gold
Covers	Released: December 31, 2012; Label: Blue Note; Formats: CD	112	—	—	—	—	—	—	—	—	—	
Begin Again	Released: April 12, 2019; Label: Blue Note; Formats: CD, digital download, vinyl	164	14	31	—	42	35	50	21	11	—	
Playing Along	Released: November 24, 2023; Label: Blue Note; Formats: Vinyl	—	—	—	—	—	—	—	—	—	—	
Autumn Jones	Released: October 4, 2024; Label: UMG; Formats: Digital	—	—	—	—	—	—	—	—	—	—	

=== Video albums ===
Title	Details	Certifications
Live in New Orleans	Released: February 25, 2003; Label: Blue Note	RIAA: 2× Platinum; ARIA: 2× Platinum; BPI: Gold; BVMI: Gold; MC: 3× Platinum; NVPI: Gold; SNEP: 2× Platinum
Live in 2004	Released: November 16, 2004; Label: Blue Note	IFPI AUT: Gold; SNEP: Gold
Live from Austin, TX	Released: September 2, 2008; Label: Blue Note/New West	RIAA: Gold
Live at Ronnie Scott's	Released: 2018; Label: Eagle Rock Entertainment	

=== Albums as part of other groups ===
- Butterflies (as a member of Laszlo; Released: 1999; Label: Self-released)
- Wax Poetic (as a member of Wax Poetic; Released: March 14, 2000; Label: Nablu)
- Nablu Sessions (as a member of Wax Poetic; Released: March 14, 2003; Label: Nablu)
- The Little Willies (as a member of The Little Willies; Released March 7, 2006; Label: Milking Bull)
- El Madmo (as a member of El Madmo; Released: May 20, 2008; Label: Team Love)
- For the Good Times (as a member of The Little Willies; Released January 6, 2012; Label: Milking Bull)
- No Fools, No Fun (as a member of Puss n Boots; Released: July 15, 2014; Label: Blue Note)
- Sister (as a member of Puss n Boots; Released: February 14, 2020; Label: Blue Note)
- Dear Santa EP (as a member of Puss n Boots; Released: October 25, 2019; Label: Blue Note)

== Extended plays ==
Title	EP details
First Sessions	Released: 2001; Label: Blue Note; Format: CD
Deep Cuts	Released: April 7, 2009; Label: Blue Note; Format: CD, digital download
iTunes Festival: London 2012	Released: October 2, 2012; Label: Blue Note, Capitol; Format: Digital download
Spotify Singles	Released: November 1, 2017; Label: Blue Note, Capitol; Format: Digital download
Morning Jones	Released: August 7, 2020; Label: Formats:
Playdate	Released: November 27, 2020; Label: Capitol, Blue Note; Formats: Vinyl
Christmas with You (with Laufey)	Released: November 10, 2023; Label: Capitol, Blue Note; Formats: streaming

== Singles ==
Title	Year	Peak chart positions										Certifications	Album
Title	Year	US	US AAA	AUS	AUT	CAN	FRA	ITA	JPN	NLD	UK	Certifications	Album
"Don't Know Why"	2002	30	5	5	56	—	74	—	4	86	59	RIAA: 3× Platinum; ARIA: Platinum; FIMI: Platinum	Come Away with Me
"Feelin' the Same Way"	2002	—	—	—	—	—	—	—	78	—	72		Come Away with Me
"Come Away with Me"	2002	—	12	—	—	2	97	—	—	87	80	RIAA: 2× Platinum; BPI: Platinum; FIMI: Gold	Come Away with Me
"Turn Me On"	2003	—	—	—	—	10	92	—	—	—	—	RIAA: Platinum; BPI: Silver	Come Away with Me
"Don't Know Why" / "I'll Be Your Baby Tonight"	2003	—	—	—	—	—	—	—	—	—	67	BPI: Gold	Come Away with Me
"Sunrise"	2004	—	1	—	44	4	—	13	1	58	30	RIAA: Platinum; BPI: Gold; FIMI: Platinum	Feels Like Home
"What Am I to You?"	2004	—	1	—	—	—	—	—	15	66	—		Feels Like Home
"Those Sweet Words"	2004	—	—	—	—	—	—	—	—	—	—		Feels Like Home
"Thinking About You"	2006	82	1	—	49	—	—	5	1	11	—		Not Too Late
"Not Too Late"	2007	—	—	—	—	—	—	—	—	—	—		Not Too Late
"Sinkin' Soon"	2007	—	—	—	—	—	—	36	—	—	—		Not Too Late
"Until the End"	2007	—	—	—	—	—	—	—	86	—	—		Not Too Late
"Be My Somebody"	2007	—	26	—	—	—	—	—	—	—	—		Not Too Late
"The Story"	2008	—	—	—	—	—	—	—	—	—	—		My Blueberry Nights soundtrack
"Chasing Pirates"	2009	110	1	—	38	—	—	31	4	—	87		The Fall
"Young Blood"	2010	—	—	—	—	—	—	—	33	—	—		The Fall
"It's Gonna Be"	2010	—	11	—	—	—	—	—	—	—	—		The Fall
"Virginia Moon" (featuring Foo Fighters)	2010	—	—	—	—	—	—	—	—	—	—		...Featuring
"More Than This" (featuring Charlie Hunter)	2011	—	—	—	—	—	—	—	54	—	—		...Featuring
"Home for the Holidays" (with Cyndi Lauper)	2011	—	—	—	—	—	—	—	—	—	—		Non-album single
"Happy Pills"	2012	—	4	—	—	—	188	—	7	—	—		Little Broken Hearts
"Miriam"	2012	—	—	—	—	—	—	—	82	—	—		Little Broken Hearts
"It Came Upon a Midnight Clear"	2012	—	—	—	—	—	—	—	95	—	—		Non-album single
"Carry On"	2016	—	8	—	—	—	107	—	37	—	—		Day Breaks
"Flipside"	2016	—	27	—	—	—	—	—	—	—	—		Day Breaks
"My Heart Is Full"	2018	—	—	—	—	—	—	—	—	—	—		Begin Again
"It Was You"	2018	—	—	—	—	—	—	—	—	—	—		Begin Again
"A Song with No Name"	2018	—	—	—	—	—	—	—	—	—	—		Begin Again
"Wintertime"	2018	—	—	—	—	—	—	—	—	—	—		Begin Again
"Just a Little Bit"	2019	—	—	—	—	—	—	—	—	—	—		Begin Again
"Take It Away" (with Tarriona "Tank" Ball)	2019	—	—	—	—	—	—	—	—	—	—		Non-album singles
"I'll Be Gone" (with Mavis Staples)	2019	—	—	—	—	—	—	—	—	—	—		Non-album singles
"I Forgot" / "Falling" (with Rodrigo Amarante)	2019	—	—	—	—	—	—	—	—	—	—		Non-album singles
"Playing Along" (with Tarriona "Tank" Ball)	2019	—	—	—	—	—	—	—	—	—	—		Non-album singles
"I’m Alive"	2020	—	24	—	—	—	—	—	—	—	—		Pick Me Up Off the Floor
"The Christmas Waltz" (Amazon Original)	2021	—	—	—	—	—	—	—	—	—	—		Non-album singles
"Can You Believe"	2023	—	—	—	—	—	—	—	— (Note: "Can You Believe" did not enter the Japan Hot 100, but peaked at number 11 on the Hot Overseas chart.)	—	—		Non-album singles
"Running"	2024	—	7	—	—	—	—	—	— (Note: "Running" did not enter the Japan Hot 100, but peaked at number three on the Hot Overseas chart.)	—	—		Visions
"Paradise"	2024	—	—	—	—	—	—	—	—	—	—		Visions
"Summertime Blue" (with John Legend)	2025	—	—	—	—	—	—	—	— (Note: "Summertime Blue" did not enter the Japan Hot 100, but peaked at number three on the Hot Overseas chart.)	—	—		TBA
"Somethin' Stupid" (with Josh Homme)	2026	—	—	—	—	—	—	—	— (Note: "Somethin' Stupid" did not enter the Japan Hot 100, but peaked at number 18 on the Hot Overseas chart.)	—	—		Non-album singles
"April's Gone" (with Chris Stapleton)	2026	—	—	—	—	—	—	—	— (Note: "April's Gone" did not enter the Japan Hot 100, but peaked at number 11 on the Hot Overseas chart.)	—	—		Non-album singles
"—" denotes a recording that did not chart or was not released in that territory.

=== As featured artist ===
Title	Year	Album
"Traces of You" (Anoushka Shankar featuring Norah Jones)	2013	Traces of You
"Seventeen" (Sharon Van Etten featuring Norah Jones)	2020	Non-album single
"Paradise II" (Logic featuring Norah Jones)	2023	College Park
"I'm in Trouble" (Alessia Cara featuring Norah Jones)	2026	Love or Lack Thereof

== Other charted songs ==
Title	Year	Peak chart positions			Album
Title	Year	US	US AC	US Country	Album
"Across the Universe" (with Alicia Keys, Alison Krauss, Billie Joe Armstrong, Bono, Brian Wilson, Steven Tyler, Stevie Wonder, Tim McGraw & Velvet Revolver)	2005	22	—	—	Non-album song
"Baby, It's Cold Outside" (with Willie Nelson)	2010	—	—	55	American Classic
"Christmas Calling (Jolly Jones)"	2021	—	29	—	I Dream of Christmas
"Christmas Don't Be Late"	2021	—	26	—	I Dream of Christmas

== Other appearances ==
Year	Song	Album
2002	"Nightingale"	Live from Bonnaroo 2002
2003	"The Wurlitzer Prize (I Don't Want to Get Over You)"	Lonesome, On'ry and Mean: A Tribute to Waylon Jennings
2003	"Why Can't He Be You"	Remembering Patsy Cline
2003	"The Grass Is Blue"	Just Because I'm a Woman: Songs of Dolly Parton
2004	"Love Me Tender" (with Adam Levy)	The Princess Diaries 2: Royal Engagement
2005	"I Think It's Going to Rain Today"	Higher Ground Hurricane Relief Benefit Concert
2005	"Any Other Day" (with Wyclef Jean)	Hurricane Relief: Come Together Now
2006	"Creepin' In"	The Bridge School Collection, Vol.1
2006	"Nearness of You"	The Bridge School Collection, Vol.1
2007	"World of Trouble"	The Hottest State Soundtrack
2007	"American Anthem"	The War, A Ken Burns Film, the Soundtrack
2007	"My Blue Heaven"	Goin' Home: A Tribute to Fats Domino
2009	"That's What I Said"	NCIS: The Official TV Soundtrack - Vol. 2
2009	"Jesus, Etc."	The Bridge School Collection, Vol. 4
2011	"Change Is Gonna Come"	Wretches & Jabberers Soundtrack
2011	"Tell Me Why"	MusiCares Tribute to Neil Young
2011	"How Many Times Have You Broken My Heart?"	The Lost Notebooks of Hank Williams
2012	"If the Law Don't Want You"	KIN: Songs by Mary Karr & Rodney Crowell
2012	"Everybody Needs a Best Friend"	Ted
2012	"Clairvoyance" (with Merkabah 13 and Anoushka Shankar)	90 Percent Of 13
2012	"Always Judging"	This Is 40
2013	"(Talk to Me Of) Mendocino"	Sing Me the Songs: Celebrating the Works of Kate McGarrigle
2013	"As Fast as My Feet Can Carry Me" (with Emmylou Harris)	Sing Me the Songs: Celebrating the Works of Kate McGarrigle
2013	"Over the Hill" (with Lily Lanken)	Sing Me the Songs: Celebrating the Works of Kate McGarrigle
2013	"Love Over and Over" (as Sing Me the Songs Ensemble)	Sing Me the Songs: Celebrating the Works of Kate McGarrigle
2014	"It Was the Last Thing on Your Mind"	They Came Together
2014	"Just Noise"	Song Reader
2014	"If You Want the Rainbow (You Must Have the Rain)"	Boardwalk Empire Volume 3: Music from the HBO Original Series
2015	"Oh! Darling"	A MusiCares Tribute To Paul McCartney
2015	"Mean Ol' Moon"	Ted 2
2016	"Something"	George Fest: A Night to Celebrate the Music of George Harrison
2016	"Behind That Locked Door"	George Fest: A Night to Celebrate the Music of George Harrison
2016	"All Things Must Pass" (with Ann Wilson, Dhani Harrison, and Karen Elson)	George Fest: A Night to Celebrate the Music of George Harrison
2016	"One Voice" (with Aimee Mann, Susanna Hoffs, Lydia Loveless, Neko Case, Kathryn Calder, and Brian May)	One Voice
2017	"Unchained Melody"	Resistance Radio: The Man in the High Castle Album
2019	"Never My Love"	Echo in the Canyon

=== Guest appearances ===
Year	Song	Artist(s)	Album
2001	"More Than This"	Charlie Hunter Quartet	Songs from the Analog Playground
2001	"Day Is Done"	Charlie Hunter Quartet	Songs from the Analog Playground
2002	"Lonestar"	Willie Nelson & Friends	Stars & Guitars
2002	"In the Dark"	Jools Holland and His Rhythm & Blues Orchestra	More Friends: Small World Big Band Volume 2
2002	"Ruler of My Heart"	Dirty Dozen Brass Band	Medicated Magic
2002	"I Could Lie to You"	Noam Weinstein	Above the Music
2003	"What Makes You"	Jesse Harris & The Ferdinandos	The Secret Sun
2003	"If You Won't"	Jesse Harris & The Ferdinandos	The Secret Sun
2003	"The Wurlitzer Prize (I Don't Want to Get Over You)"	Willie Nelson	Live and Kickin'
2003	"I Walk the Line"	Joel Harrison	Free Country
2003	"Tennessee Waltz"	Joel Harrison	Free Country
2003	"Take Off Your Cool"	OutKast	The Love Below
2003	"Sweet Dreams"	Jim Campilongo Electric Trio	American Hips
2003	"Stella"	Jim Campilongo Electric Trio	American Hips
2004	"Wish I Was a Bird"	Jesse Harris & The Ferdinandos	While The Music Lasts
2004	"While the Music Lasts"	Jesse Harris & The Ferdinandos	While The Music Lasts
2004	"Mirror Ball"	Jesse Harris & The Ferdinandos	While The Music Lasts
2004	"One Day the Dam Will Break"	Jesse Harris & The Ferdinandos	While The Music Lasts
2004	"I Got It Bad and That Ain't Good"	Dayna Kurtz	Beautiful Yesterday
2005	"Slow New York"	Richard Julian	Slow New York
2005	"A Short Biography"	Richard Julian	Slow New York
2005	"Making Movies"	Richard Julian	Slow New York
2005	"Rita"	Rachel Loshak	Rachel Loshak
2005	"Dear John"	Ryan Adams and The Cardinals	Jacksonville City Nights
2005	"Virginia Moon"	Foo Fighters	In Your Honour
2005	"Happiness Today"	Robert Gomez	Etherville
2005	"Keep It Loose, Keep It Tight"	Amos Lee	Amos Lee
2005	"Colors"	Amos Lee	Amos Lee
2005	"Wild Horses"	Tim Ries	The Rolling Stones Project
2006	"Sucker"	Peeping Tom	Peeping Tom
2006	"Soon the New Day"	Talib Kweli	Eardrum
2006	"Lonely Lament"	Liberation Prophecy	Last Exit Angel
2006	"I Don't Want Anything to Change"	Bonnie Raitt	Bonnie Raitt and Friends
2006	"Tennessee Waltz"	Bonnie Raitt	Bonnie Raitt and Friends
2006	"Love Sneakin' Up On You"	Bonnie Raitt	Bonnie Raitt and Friends
2007	"Crazy Arms"	Jerry Lee Lewis	Last Man Standing Live
2007	"Your Cheatin' Heart"	Jerry Lee Lewis	Last Man Standing Live
2007	"Easy"	Anoushka Shankar and Karsh Kale	Breathing Under Water
2007	"Always Seem to Get Things Wrong"	Willie Nelson	The Hottest State Soundtrack
2007	"Crooked Lines"	M. Ward	The Hottest State Soundtrack
2007	"Court and Spark"	Herbie Hancock	River: The Joni Letters
2007	"Any Other Day"	Wyclef Jean	Carnival Vol. II: Memoirs of an Immigrant
2008	"Life Is Better"	Q-Tip	The Renaissance
2008	"Thinking About You"	Irma Thomas	Simply Grand
2009	"Dreamgirl"	The Lonely Island	Incredibad
2009	"Aftermath"	Doveman	The Conformist
2010	"Little Lou, Ugly Jack, Prophet John"	Belle & Sebastian	Write About Love
2010	"Typecast"	Ryan Adams and The Cardinals	III/IV
2011	"Ill Wind"	Charlie Haden	Sophisticated Ladies
2011	"Season's Trees"	Danger Mouse & Daniele Luppi starring Jack White & Norah Jones	Rome
2011	"Black"	Danger Mouse & Daniele Luppi starring Jack White & Norah Jones	Rome
2011	"Problem Queen"	Danger Mouse & Daniele Luppi starring Jack White & Norah Jones	Rome
2011	"Speak Low"	Tony Bennett	Duets II
2011	"Two Sleepy People"	Seth MacFarlane	Music Is Better Than Words
2011	"Dirty Rain"	Ryan Adams	Ashes & Fire
2011	"Come Home"	Ryan Adams	Ashes & Fire
2011	"Chains of Love"	Ryan Adams	Ashes & Fire
2011	"Save Me"	Ryan Adams	Ashes & Fire
2011	"Kindness"	Ryan Adams	Ashes & Fire
2011	"Lucky Now"	Ryan Adams	Ashes & Fire
2011	"I Love You But I Don't Know What to Say"	Ryan Adams	Ashes & Fire
2012	"For the Record"	Kathleen Edwards	Voyageur
2012	"Rocking Chairs"	Jesse Harris	Sub Rosa
2012	"Rube and Mandy at Coney Island"	Jesse Harris	Sub Rosa
2012	"Let It All Come Down"	Jesse Harris	Sub Rosa
2012	"Fall Away"	Wax Poetic	On a Ride
2012	"This Time"	Vinicius Cantuária	Indio de Apartamento
2012	"Brother & Sister"	Lindsey Buckingham	This Is 40
2012	"I Got You (At the End of the Century)"	Wilco	This Is 40
2013	"Roll Me Up"	Willie Nelson & Friends	Vault Platinum Package #17: Willie Nelson & Friends Live at Third Man Records
2013	"Funny How Time Slips Away"	Willie Nelson & Friends	Vault Platinum Package #17: Willie Nelson & Friends Live at Third Man Records
2013	"I Gotta Get Drunk"	Willie Nelson & Friends	Vault Platinum Package #17: Willie Nelson & Friends Live at Third Man Records
2013	"Whiskey River"	Willie Nelson & Friends	Vault Platinum Package #17: Willie Nelson & Friends Live at Third Man Records
2013	"The Sun Won't Set"	Anoushka Shankar	Traces of You
2013	"Traces of You"	Anoushka Shankar	Traces of You
2013	"Unsaid"	Anoushka Shankar	Traces of You
2013	"Walkin'"	Willie Nelson	To All the Girls...
2013	"Let It Ride"	Robert Glasper Experiment	Black Radio 2
2014	"Here I Am"	Jim Campilongo	Dream Dictionary
2014	"Cry No More"	Dawn Landes	Bluebird
2014	"Love Song"	Dawn Landes	Bluebird
2014	"August"	So Brown	Point Legere
2014	"Little Jack Frost Get Lost"	Seth MacFarlane	Holiday for Swing
2015	"Fools Rush In"	Harold Mabern	Afro Blue
2015	"Don't Misunderstand"	Harold Mabern	Afro Blue
2015	"Illusion"	Keith Richards	Crosseyed Heart
2016	"You Are So Beautiful"	Charles Lloyd & The Marvels	I Long to See You
2017	"If I Had a Talking Picture of You"	Seth MacFarlane	In Full Swing
2017	"Beatrice"	Kate Fenner	Middle Voice
2017	"You're a Big Girl now"	Kate Fenner	Middle Voice
2017	"Passenger"	Kate Fenner	Middle Voice
2018	"What Is This Thing Called Love?"	Willie Nelson	My Way
2019	"Okolona River Bottom Band"	Mercury Rev	Bobbie Gentry's The Delta Sweete Revisited
2019	"Angel Eyes"	Kandace Springs	The Women Who Raised Me

== Music videos ==
Year	Track	Director
2003	"Come Away with Me"	James Frost
2003	"Don't Know Why"	Anastasia Simone and Ian Spencer
2004	"Sunrise"	James Frost
2004	"What Am I to You?"	Quinn Williams
2004	"Those Sweet Words"	David LaChapelle
2006	"Thinking About You"	Ace Norton
2007	"Sinkin' Soon"	Ace Norton
2007	"Until the End"	James Frost
2009	"Chasing Pirates"	Rich Lee
2009	"Young Blood"	Toben Seymour
2009	"Life Is Better" (Q-Tip ft. Norah Jones)	James Slater
2011	"Speak Low" (Tony Bennett ft. Norah Jones)	Unjoo Moon
2012	"Happy Pills"	Isaiah Seret
2012	"Miriam"	Philip Andelman
2013	"Traces of You" (Anoushka Shankar ft. Norah Jones)	Joe Wright
2014	"Kentucky" (Billy Joe Armstrong ft. Norah Jones)	Tim Wheeler
2016	"Carry On"	Claire Marie Vogel
2017	"Flipside"	Sam Kuhn
2020	"I'm Alive"	Mara Whitehead
2020	"Tryin' to Keep It Together"	Marcela Avelar
2020	"To Live"	unknown
2020	"Flame Twin"	Blue Note Records
