= Thinking About You (Norah Jones song) =

Single by Norah Jones

from the album Not Too Late
- B-side: "2 Men"; "Wish I Could"
- Written: 1999
- Released: December 5, 2006
- Recorded: 2003 (Note: Jones first recorded "Thinking About You" for her second studio album Feels like Home (2004). After it failed to make the album's final track listing, it was re-recorded for Not Too Late.); 2006
- Studio: The Coop (New York City)
- Genre: Blues; jazz; soul
- Length: 3:19
- Label: Blue Note
- Songwriters: Norah Jones; Ilhan Ersahin
- Producer: Lee Alexander

Norah Jones singles chronology
"Sunrise" (2004)	"Thinking About You" (2006)	"Sinkin' Soon" (2007)

Music video
- "Thinking About You" on YouTube

"Thinking About You" is a song recorded by American singer-songwriter Norah Jones for her third studio album Not Too Late (2007). It was written by Jones and Ilhan Ersahin, and produced by Lee Alexander. The song was released as the lead single from Not Too Late on December 5, 2006, by Blue Note Records.

In the US, "Thinking About You" reached number 82 on the Billboard Hot 100, while peaking atop the Adult Alternative Songs, on which it became Jones' third consecutive number-one.

== Background and composition ==
Jones wrote "Thinking About You" in 1999 with Ilhan Ersahin, her then-bandmate in Wax Poetic. She said the song had "always been in the back of my mind", but she thought it was too much of a pop song for her and preferred if someone else were to record it. She recorded a version of it for her second album, Feels like Home (2004), but according to her it sounded "too country-rock". According to the producer, she "found a way to make it work" during the recording of Not Too Late.

== Critical reception ==
Stephen Thomas Erlewine from AllMusic picked the song among the best tracks on the album, calling it a "wonderful laid-back soul". Sia Michel from Entertainment Weekly called it a "safety-net single", with its sexy, cocktail-party swing, the tune could be her first real radio hit since 'Don't Know Why'." Neil Spencer from The Observer commented that the song "looks like a conscious attempt not to scare the punters." Tom Woods called it "a lovely pop song, with nostalgic lyrics." Tyler Fisher from Sputnikmusic commented that the song is "a western jazz hybrid in the truest sense, with very country-styled melodies from the organ and Wurlitzer, but the jazzy horn section provides great countermelodies."

== Commercial performance ==
Released in the United States on December 5, 2006, "Thinking About You" was one of the first songs by a major artist to be available for paid digital download in mp3 format. The single entered the US Billboard Hot 100 at number eighty-two in early February 2007, becoming Jones's first chart entry since "Don't Know Why" (2002).

== Music video ==
The music video, directed by Ace Norton, was filmed on a soundstage at Steiner Studios in Brooklyn, New York with a cast of eight people, including Jones. According to videostatic.com, it contains elements from some of Norton's previous videos—for Peter Walker's "What Do I Know" (the "within the within" effect), Death Cab for Cutie's "Someday You Will Be Loved" (the animated heart) and Death Cab for Cutie's "Crooked Teeth" (the Claymation). The video premiered on December 19, 2006.

== Cover versions ==
Irma Thomas recorded the song for her 2008 album Simply Grand. Jones performed as a guest pianist on the recording.

== Track listings and formats ==
North American promotional CD single

1. "Thinking About You" – 3:17

European CD single

1. "Thinking About You" – 3:17
2. "2 Men" – 2:30

European maxi CD single

1. "Thinking About You" – 3:17
2. "2 Men" – 2:30
3. "Wish I Could" – 4:18

== Charts ==
=== Weekly charts ===
2006–2007 weekly chart performance for "Thinking About You"
Chart	Peak position
Austria (Ö3 Austria Top 40)	49
Belgium (Ultratip Bubbling Under Flanders)	9
Belgium (Ultratip Bubbling Under Wallonia)	8
Netherlands (Single Top 100)	11
European Hot 100 Singles (Billboard)	40
Germany (GfK)	65
Italy (FIMI)	5
Spain (Promusicae)	9
Switzerland (Schweizer Hitparade)	35
UK Singles (Official Charts)	89
US Billboard Hot 100	82
US Adult Alternative Airplay (Billboard)	1
US Smooth Jazz Airplay (Billboard)	7

=== All-time charts ===
All-time chart performance for "Thinking About You"
Chart	Position
US Adult Alternative Songs (Billboard)	82

== Release history ==
Release dates and formats for "Thinking About You"
Region	Date	Format(s)	Label(s)	Ref.
United States	December 5, 2006	Digital download (Yahoo! Music exclusive)	Blue Note	
Germany	January 12, 2007	CD; maxi CD	EMI	
United Kingdom	January 22, 2007	CD	Parlophone	
