= Nublu Records =

American record label

Nublu Records is an independent recording company founded by Swedish–Turkish musician, composer, cultural activist and entrepreneur, Ilhan Ersahin in 2005. It was a natural extension of the "Nublu sound" that developed at the club, Nublu, on Manhattan's Lower East Side, founded by Ersahin in 2002. Capturing the cross-cultural fusion of the times, and embracing the beatnik jazz tradition for which the area has been known since the 1950s, an unofficial family of bands soon congregated around the club, which was known for its freewheeling late night jams. As more and more outfits formed, setting up Nublu Records was a logical progression.

== Bands formed at Nublu ==
The core of the Nublu record label roster is projects of Ersahin's, and of friends who came together because of the Nublu Club. First among them was Wax Poetic, a jazzy trip-hop poetry collective which pre-dates Nublu, as they first played at the louche after-hours club Save the Robots on Avenue B. Serious singers like the young Norah Jones and Bebel Gilberto, have passed through their ranks. Wax Poetic gravitated to Nublu Records when their deal with Atlantic Records was up (they were signed by Ersahin's friend, pioneering Turkish jazz producer Ahmet Ertegun, who founded Atlantic.) After starting the label, Ersahin used the Wax Poetic name as an umbrella for a trilogy of albums for Nublu Records, reflecting territories with which he felt a deep connection and using local musicians: “Copenhagen” (2006), "Brasil" (2007) and "Istanbul"(2007.)

Another band stemming from the Nublu club's earliest days is Love Trio. They sprang directly from the transition between Ersahin's decade working his way up at the Sweet Basil Jazz Club in the West Village, and the start of Nublu. His regular Saturday brunch sessions at Sweet Basil became the basis for many musical collaborations, as the Nublu club jams were to do later. Love Trio includes musicians from that pre-Nublu period: Californian bassist Jesse Murphy (who went on to play with Brazilian Girls,) and drummer Kenny Wollesen known for his work with Tom Waits. Their first Nublu release, "Love Trio," (2003) featured Ersahin's longtime partner, legendary trumpeter Eddie Henderson, vocalist Marla Turner, Kenny Wollesen, Jesse Murphy and DJ Logic. Three years later, Love Trio released "In Dub," showcasing the original toasting (rapping) of Jamaican DJ legend U-Roy, a childhood hero of Ersahin's who helped turn him onto Jamaican music in his teens. Vocalists Marla Turner and Sabina Sciubba, singer of The Brazilian Girls, also appear on the album. Love Trio performed with Arto Tuncboyaciyan in 2013.

Arguably the original soul of Nublu was its presiding genius, Lawrence "Butch" Morris, the creator of the Conduction sound. For ten years until his death in 2013, Morris, who lived on nearby East 7th Street, made Nublu his experimental laboratory and base. Conduction is a method of controlled improvisation, in which Morris, or the conductor, leads a group of players through music s/he is improvising, using the baton, coded ideographic gestures and body language identified with different notes, tempos and textures, to create spontaneous music of great emotionality.

The Nublu Orchestra drew on the Nublu crew of bands and musicians, including Ersahin, his longtime collaborator, trumpeters Eddie Henderson, cornettist Graham Haynes and members of the Nublu bands and associates, Didi Gutman, Jesse Murphy and Sabina Sciubba, Wax Poetic, Kudu's Sylvia Gordon, Forro in the Dark's Mauro Refosco, Love Trio's Kenny Wollesen, jazz drummer Jochen Rueckert with Aaron Johnston, Chantal Ughi, Doug Wieselman, Jonathan Haffner, Kirk Knuffke, Zeke Zima, Michael Kiaer and Daniel Jodocy.

Ersahin also formed the trio I Led Three Lives at Nublu. His saxophone and keyboards fitted together with Jochen Rueckert and veteran bass player Juini Booth. "Peace Now," (2008) their first album, shows the trio hitting some comparatively hard, harsh improvised jazz that verges on psychedelia, or industrial and metal music. Their name is taken from the paranoid Cold War anti-Communist TV show of the 1950s about a counter-spy for the Communists and the FBI, based on the autobiography of the same name by Herbert Philbrick.

== The Turkish connection ==
Ersahin has two distinctly Turkish-inflected projects on the Nublu label: Istanbul Sessions and Wonderland. Third-generation virtuoso gypsy clarinetist, Hüsnü Şenlendirici, is key to Wonderland's highly melodic Nublu brew of trip-hop and dub-tinged jazz, interwoven with ancient Turkish harmonics. On their 2002 album, "Harikalar Diyari (Wonderland,)" their dreamy sound features the floaty, mysterious voices of three young Turkish singing sensations, Nil, Bora and the teenage Dilara. In 2013, Wonderland performed at Drom on the Lower East Side, promoted by Serdar Ilhan and the New York-based Turkish educator and promoter, Mehmet Dede, with the support of the Turkish Ministry of Culture and Tourism.

Ersahin put "Istanbul Sessions" together as a project for a one-off event at a 2009 art opening in Istanbul with local players, bassist Alp Ersonmez, drummer Turgut Alp Bekoglu, and percussionist Izzet Kizil, which has organically blossomed into a quartet that tours the world. Their first release, "Istanbul Sessions featuring Erik Truffaz," with the noted Swiss-French experimental jazz trumpeter, has a cool acoustic, meditative improvised sound. Stripped down to a quartet, the second Istanbul Sessions release, "Night Rider," (2011) is harder-edged, with a more urban sensibility. Ersahin has described their mission as an attempt to capture the variety and edge of Istanbul's hectic nightlife, and his modal horn inflections mix here with urgent jazz-funk rhythms.

== The Brazilian connection ==
As well as Turkey and New York's Lower East Side, various Nublu projects are connected with another spiritual home, Brazil (the home of Ersahin's wife, Fernanda.) Forro in the Dark are four expatriate Brazilians in New York. Like so much around the Nublu scene, they began spontaneously, for a one-off gig at a birthday party at the Nublu club in 2002. They are made up of Mauro Refosco on vocals and zabumba (a Brazilian bass drum worn around the body and played standing up); Davi Vieira on vocals and timbau (a Brazilian drum typical of Bahia); Guilherme Monteiro on guitar and vocals; and Jorge Continentino on pifano, (a wooden flute from Northeastern Brazil,) baritone sax and vocals. Jorge and Guilherme come from a jazz background and Mauro is from the downtown avant-garde. Their high energy Brazilian party ambiance has drawn collaborators like David Byrne. Indivisible from the Nublu Club, where their Wednesday night sessions are part of the club's identity, Forro in the Dark are an instant traveling Brazilian party ("Forro" are dance rhythms from North-Eastern Brazil, associated with the June Festivals.) They recorded their Nublu EP, "Dia de Roda" ("Day of the Gathering,") over three days at Super Legal Studios in Manhattan, sharing the songwriting. The band say that the lyrics of the title track express their philosophy: "Today's the party, I can be a gypsy!"

3 Na Massa was founded in São Paulo, Brazil, by producer Rica Amabis, and the Silva brothers, drummer Pupillo and bass-player, Sucinto. Also known as Dengue, the Silva brothers are well known as the rhythm section of the popular Brazilian fusion-rock band, Nação Zumbi (Zombie Nation.) The mysterious, ambient electronica of their first album, "The Brotherhood of Seduction," (2008) is tinged with dub and their own Brazilian sounds. A concept piece, it tells the stories of 13 women, using some of Brazil's top female voices, Céu, Nina Miranda, Thalma de Freitas, Karine Carvalho and Alice Braga.

Otto is an established star in his native Brazil, where the Brazilian singer, composer and producer has long been hailed as a prominent voice in the manguebeat movement, as part of the bands Mundo Livre S/A and Chico Science. Growing up in remote Pernambuco state in Brazil's North-East, he was steeped in the rich mix of local rhythms, a rural sophistication he melds with international urban grooves. With drummer Pupillo, he co-produced his fifth album, his first for Nublu Records, the haunting Certa Manhã Acordei de Sonhos Intranquilos, (One Morning I Awoke From Restless Dreams) which includes a ska tinged ode to Iemanja, the Yoruba goddess of the sea. Label founder Ersahin co-wrote the track, "Six Minutos." The album features the Brazilian singers Céu and Grammy winner, Julieta Venegas.

== Nu-jazz ==
"Our Theory" was another project on which Ersahin collaborated with Erik Truffaz. To explore a more ambient funky free jazz direction, they connected with members of Wax Poetic and the Nublu Orchestra, Danish guitar player Thor Madsen, and Jochen Rueckert. The "Our Theory" album, which Ersahin has described as "Nu-Jazz," was recorded over a two-day period, and then became a pet project of Ersahin and Matt Penman, the band's Australian bass player, who tinkered with it for two years before releasing "Our Theory" in 2005.

== Eclectic electronica ==
Several of the more pop-dance electronica groups on Nublu capture something of the experimental, edgy, sometimes slightly disturbing 1980s No wave sensibility evocative of the old Lower East Side of cabarets and after-hours joints. The Brooklyn trio Kudu are singer/songwriter Sylvia Gordon aka Illvia and Betty Black, drummer Deantoni "D" Parks and synthesizer player, Nick Kasper. Their "Death of the Party," (2006) demonstrates their electronic pop, with a dark, eerie edge and an undercurrent of funk and dub.

Hessismore is one of the many collaborative projects of Danish musician Mikkel Hess. The title track of the relaxed, plaintive, electronic pop release, "Hess Is More: Creation Keeps the Devil Away” (2011) was featured on NPR. In 2012 a full length remix album was released entitled "Creation Keeps the Devil Away - The Remixes".

Other European branches of the Nublu family include Calibro 35, an instrumental group from Italy, made up of Enrico Gabrielli on horns and keyboards; Massimo Martellotta, guitars; Luca Cavina on bass; drummer Fabio Rondanini and engineers/synthesizer Tommaso Colliva. Their album, 'Any Resemblance to Real Persons or Actual Facts is Purely Coincidental,' (2012) is grounded in their trademark sound, the dramatically ambient feel of 1960s Spaghetti Western soundtracks, with a funkier feel. But on the album, they layer it with global flavors – sitar on "New Delhi Deli" and Afro-Funk on "Massacre at Dawn."

Nublu Records have also released Nublu Sound Compilations 1 & 2; Nublu Dance, a remix compilation and re-mixed album versions, with several by Turkish DJ, Baris K, including "Istanbul 70 – Volume 1," his edited cut-ups of Turkish folk music and disco tracks from the 1970s.
