= Not Too Late =

Not Too Late may refer to:

- Not Too Late (album), a 2007 album by Norah Jones
- "Not Too Late" (Norah Jones song), 2007
- "Not Too Late" (Ricki-Lee Coulter song), 2017

== See also ==
- It's Not Too Late
