= İlhan Erşahin =

Turkish composer

İlhan Erşahin is a Swedish-Turkish musician and bar owner. Raised in Stockholm, he has been based in New York City since 1990. As a musician, Erşahin has performed and recorded with various musicians as well as his own projects/bands, Wax Poetic, Love Trio, Our Theory, I Led Three Lives, Wonderland and Istanbul Sessions.

Most of those bands formed or sparked because of Nublu, the club he opened on Avenue C on Manhattan's Lower East Side in 2002. The club was then on the cusp of intensive gentrification. It became a hub for musicians and DJs. Being a club in Manhattan, the music of Africa, the Caribbean and Brazil also became part of the Nublu mix, and the club became well known for its Wednesday night Forro in the Dark Brazilian sessions. Key to the scene was the creator of Conduction, Butch Morris, long a downtown fixture. Erşahin became part of different Morris projects in the late 90s. When Nublu began, they devised a new project that would apply Morris's Conduction methods to the Nublu sensibility. The result was a new direction for Morris; within the context of The Nublu Orchestra he began incorporating more beats and electronica into his sound. The ensemble became a big part of the club's identity.

== Background ==
Erşahin's family were not musicians, but Stockholm is a long-established jazz and music center and his elder brother and sisters brought home records that exposed him to the music of his generation, from rock to jazz to bossa nova and world music. When he was 14, Erşahin bought a reggae compilation album featuring the work of pioneering Jamaican DJ/toaster, U-Roy. The thrill of the sound confirmed his direction as a musician. This early passion led to Erşahin eventually recording with U Roy, on the Love Trio in Dub album. Throughout his teens, Erşahin expanded his musical horizons, turning on to the more marginal sounds of punk, hiphop, reggae and dub. As Erşahin began to teach himself to play saxophone in his teens, he knew that in order to accomplish his dreams, he had to move to the United States.

== In the United States ==
Arriving in the United States in his late teens, he enrolled briefly at Berklee School of Music in Boston in 1986. By the early 1990s, Erşahin was living in the East Village, then still a hub of underground creativity. During his first ten years in the city, Erşahin studied with sax masters Joe Lovano and John Purcell, and honed his jazz skills playing at various clubs with musicians like legendary trumpeter Eddie Henderson, Larry Grenadier, Wallace Rooney, Kevin Hays, Ben Allison, Jeff Ballard, Cindy Blackman and many more.

Throughout the decade, Erşahin worked at the jazz club Sweet Basil, where he formed a band that played for Sunday brunch. Erşahin gained experience by leading both a trio and a quartet at Sweet Basil and began performing in international jazz festivals. In 2002, Erşahin opened the Club Nublu on Avenue C. Nublu is regarded as the last hold-out of the free-wheeling spirit that the Lower East Side was known for, pre-gentrification. More than simply a club, it has become known round the world as a workshop and breeding-ground for musicians interested in trans-cultural, uncharted and multi-disciplinary music.

== Bands and albums ==
While performing his Saturday brunch sets at Sweet Basil, performing modern jazz, Erşahin attracted the attention of a small independent label in San Francisco called Golden Horn and recorded two albums for them. His first record was called "Our Song," (1997) and featured Eddie Henderson, Doug Weiss, Jon Davis and Kenny Wollesen. ("Our Song" was originally released in Turkey as "She Said.") Erşahin's second release, "Home," (1998) was a trio album featuring bassist Larry Grenadier and drummer Kenny Wollesen. His sound was described by critics as "post-bop," and he was praised for his original compositions.

The cosmopolitan, edgy ambiance of late 1990s New York reoriented Erşahin's creativity. In 2000, he released two albums with a new approach. On "Virgo," he worked with voice and words in a new way, by adding the political hip-hop poet, Saul Williams to the mix of drummer Brian Blade, pianist Jon Davis, bass player Larry Grenadier and Val Jeanty, a vocalist and electronic sample player. In late 1990, the first phase of what would become a long-running project, "Wax Poetic," was also released on a deal with Atlantic Records. The band had developed playing at Lower East Side after-hours joints, notably the long-running Save the Robots on Avenue B. The first Wax Poetic album showcased Erşahin's new direction, featuring spoken word and trip hop techniques. Norah Jones was the band's lead singer for two years and her first released recorded song was "Angels," on Wax Poetic's first self-titled record. Initially released on Atlantic Records in 2000, it was re-issued on Nublu Records in 2013. Other musicians on that record were Arto Tuncboyaciyan, Marlon Browden, Eddie Henderson, Kurt Rosenwinkel and Guyora Kats. Its sound is a snapshot of downtown NYC at that time, and the video features the band in iconic Lower East Side locations such as Tompkins Square Park.

Released two years after the opening of the Nublu club, "Wax Poetic Nublu Sessions," 2004, was equally a time capsule of the energy of the club's live shows and jams. This incarnation of Wax Poetic had a strong spread of voices, including Norah Jones, soul-jazz performer, N'Dea Davenport, Saul Williams, Marla Turner, and Turkish singer Nil Karaibrahimgil.

Erşahin delved more specifically into the modal textures of Turkish music in his atmospheric album "Harikalar Diyari (Wonderland)" in 2002. Wonderland also features the sound of Hüsnü Şenlendirici, a third generation Turkish clarinet virtuoso. This record was a particularly important release in Turkey, as it featured four then unknown up and coming artists who went on to become famous: Hüsnü Şenlendirici and vocalists Nil Karaibrahimgil, Bora Uzer and Dilara Sakpinar, who was 14 at the time of the recording. Its blend of traditional 'world music' with electronica and dance beats, was new in Turkey and made the record extremely successful and influential.

To capture the sound of his creative Nublu community, Erşahin founded Nublu Records in 2005. Among their first releases were three releases under the name Wax Poetic; however, in that period, the band was not active and Erşahin adopted the name for his experiments with local musicians in different countries. The result was a conceptual trilogy: "Copenhagen" (2006), "Brasil" (2007) and "Istanbul"(2007.)

The next Wax Poetic release, "On A Ride," (2012) was an encounter between Erşahin and Swedish pop producer Klas Wikberg. In 2013, Wax Poetic released "Tonight," an album of remixes by Nouvelle Vague and Rob Garza from Thievery Corporation; and Erşahin started yet another version of Wax Poetic, working with producer Gus Oberg, who produced the last two albums by the band, The Strokes.

Erşahin released two albums as part of the Love Trio, together with Californian bassist Jesse Murphy (who went on to play with The Brazilian Girls,) and drummer Kenny Wollesen who plays with Tom Waits and John Zorn, among many others. The improvisational trio gave Erşahin the opportunity to explore his roots in reggae and dub, along with turntablism and the new electronica, which dub had inspired in a generation, mixed with dance music. They released two albums on Nublu Records, "Love Trio" (2003) featuring contributions from Erşahin's longtime partner, legendary trumpeter Eddie Henderson, vocalist Marla Turner, Kenny Wollesen, Brazilian Girls bass player Jesse Murphy and DJ Logic; and "Love Trio in Dub with U-Roy," (2006.) The voices of The Brazilian Girls' Sabina Sciubba and Marla Turner are featured on this album as well.

Also in 2006, Erşahin played in and produced the Nublu Orchestra album under the direction of Butch Morris. As Morris resided on nearby East 7th Street, Nublu became not just a welcoming but a convenient laboratory for the creator of the Conduction sound. From the club's opening until his death a decade later, Nublu was the creative home base from which Morris was able to spread Conduction globally.

In 2006, Erşahin released the album Our Theory.

"Thinking About You," a track Erşahin co-wrote with Norah Jones, came out on her 2007 album, "Not Too Late." He also wrote the score for a BBC/Swedish TV documentary on Nobel Prize winner, Turkish Orhan Pamuk, in 2008.

In 2009, Erşahin composed the soundtrack for director Fatih Akin's section in the movie "New York, I Love You," a compilation of eleven director's segments on the city. Also in 2009, Erşahin helped form I Led Three Lives, a trio in which he played saxophone and keyboards together with drummer Jochen Rueckert and bass player Juini Booth of Tony Williams and the Sun Ra Arkestra, all regulars at the Nublu club. The trio formed as a result of many late-night jam sessions at Nublu. Their track, "House of Ahmet," from the album, "Peace Now,"(2008) was selected as Song of the Day by the University of Washington's KEXP who described "the album's range of sounds – electronica, techno, jazz, funk, blues, hip hop, house, and even psychedelia – and its ability to slash through any preconceived genre restrictions and examine how far these established stylistic ranges can be pushed."

Erşahin's next two releases both revisited musical terrain he had explored with Wax Poetic. For the first time, Erşahin chose to include himself in the group's name, calling his even more personal tribute to the city he loved, "İlhan Erşahin's Istanbul Sessions." For a 2009 art event being held in that city, Erşahin formed Istanbul Sessions with local players bassist Alp Ersonmez, drummer Turgut Alp Bekoglu, and percussionist Izzet Kizil. The one-off combo was so well received that they toured Europe and played in America and recorded an album the following year that reunited Erşahin with French trumpeter, Erik Truffaz. Istanbul Session' next release, "Night Rider," (2011) blended a cosmopolitan electro feel with its improvised jazz. Le Monde said, "Hear this! Jazz has changed form." Jazzwise Magazine described Istanbul Sessions as "...a highly distinctive new sound that connects the dense modal funk of Miles Davis' Agartha group with the dervish whirl of Turkish and middle-eastern melodies and spikes it with a potent shot of dub electronics." Writer Eli Dvorkin of Flavorwire saw Istanbul Sessions perform in Istanbul and described what he called a quintessential hometown gig: "A sold-out crowd at Babylon, one of Istanbul's best live-music clubs. The rapturous response from the hometown crowd, which eventually spilled out onto the narrow streets and ancient cobblestones of the Beyoglu neighborhood, elevated the show to a plane somewhere above an ordinary Saturday night." Such projects led to Erşahin being described as "the driving force behind the new Turkish jazz," by world music site, Gladys Palmera. Istanbul Sessions performed in Turkey at the 2012 Jazz in Ramadan festival and at 2013's Babylon Soundgarden Festival.

Next in his homages to his urban inspirations came "İlhan Erşahin's Afternoons in Rio" (2011). This time round, he assembled a group of mostly local São Paulo and Rio de Janeiro musicians including Mamelo Sound System's Lurdez da Luz and Rodrigo Brandao, Thalma de Freitas, Junio Barreto, China, Kassin, Fernando Catatau and Nina Becker. The website Sounds and Colors described it as "a certain style of music that is becoming more and more prevalent in São Paulo (i.e. the noirish-take on samba perfected by CéU), as well as showing musical links between New York and São Paulo and allowing for a number of very talented Brazilian musicians to get their chance to shine outside of their country."

Erşahin's horn has become identified with a modal style of jazz, combining the influence of the cool Nordic sound to the minor-key strains of Istanbul and the quirky funk of the East Village, Manhattan. Continuing his work as a songwriter with Brazilian links, in 2011 Erşahin co-wrote a track called "Six Minutos," with Brazilian vocalist Otto for his album, Certa Manhã Acordei de Sonhos Intranquilos. In 2012 Erşahin also co-wrote the song " Like This," with top Brazilian singer, Tulipa Ruiz. Although Erşahin has performed at many of the world's largest concert halls, his affinity for the boho soul of jazz is evident in the videos posted to YouTube of him jamming by the Bosphorus.

== Nublu Club ==
When İlhan Erşahin opened the Nublu Club in 2002, it captured the budding synergy between hiphop turntablists, the avant-garde jazzers who were still on the Lower East Side, and DJ's and players from Europe, Jamaica, Africa and Brazil. Nublu's jam sessions captured the freewheeling rivalry of cutting sessions at clubs like the legendary Minton's Playhouse's in the bebop era of the 1940s. The club's hipness was underlined by the single blue light outside the door and lack of a name signboard, giving the club the feel of a secret speakeasy adventure. Bands and DJ's performed in the middle of the club, among the audience, giving it the ambiance of an underground event. Its authenticity made Nublu a safe zone for artists, has seen many stars drop in over the years like the late Lou Reed, Caetano Veloso, David Byrne, Gilberto Gil, Bebel Gilberto, Kevin Spacey, and many more. The club's commitment to integrating turntablism into live action prompted Moby to tell XLR8R magazine in 2008 that he "had more fun DJing records for 75 people at Nublu than going on tour and performing in front of 10,000 people a night." Butch Morris held a residency there from the club's opening until his death in 2013 and led the Nublu Orchestra.

== Nublu records ==
The intense creativity that revolved around the Nublu club prompted Erşahin to start a Nublu label in 2005 as a platform for his own groups and those of his fellow players who made the club their home. Artists on Nublu Records include Erşahin's bands, Love Trio, Our Theory, Istanbul Sessions, I Led Three Lives, Wonderland and Wax Poetic; electronic dance-pop acts Hess Is More, aka Danish musician Michael Hess, praised by WNYC.com for his cinematic sensibility, and Kudu, the edgy Brooklyn-based trio; Turkish DJ Baris K; Brazilian band 3 Na Massa, Brazilian singer Otto and Calibro 35 from Milan, Italy.

== Festivals ==
Erşahin has been actively involved in promoting festivals from his earliest days in New York. He directed Istanbul's Akbank Jazz Festival and the Istanbul International Jazz Festival jam sessions for four years in a row, starting in 1996. There, he jammed alongside the likes of Sam Rivers, John Zorn, Dave Douglas, Roy Hargrove, Marcus Miller, Nicolas Payton and many more. The Nublu Jazz festival first came to be in 2009 and is now a yearly event in New York City, São Paulo and Istanbul. The Sun Ra Arkestra, Robert Glasper, Junip, Erik Truffaz, Roy Ayers, Bugge Wesseltoft, Tulipa Ruiz, Mark Turner, Graham Haynes and Adam Rudolph are among the many who have attended the Festivals so far. Erşahin told the French newspaper Liberation, who hailed him as the King of Manhattan's downtown, "Istanbul reminds me a lot of New York and São Paulo. Young people go out all the time and there are lots of interesting places to go."
