= Nublu Club =

The Nublu Club is a club in East Village, Manhattan, New York, that was opened in 2002 by Swedish-Turkish saxophonist Ilhan Ersahin. On its 10th anniversary the club's namesake festival presented what it calls the Nublu Sound, a combination of jazz, African, South American, Caribbean, electronic, and dance music. Among the bands associated with Nublu are The Brazilian Girls, Forro in the Dark, Love Trio, and Wax Poetic. Associates who perform there include Butch Morris, John Zorn, Sun Ra Arkestra, David Byrne, Caetano Veloso, Gilberto Gil, Norah Jones, and Bebel Gilberto.

Nublu currently has two locations, Nublu 151 located at 151 Ave C, and Nublu Classic located at 62 Ave C, as well as a Record Label "Nublu Records"

== History ==
Ersahin had been developing festival programming from New York since moving there from Sweden when he was 20 years old, in addition to packaging performance for festivals in Turkey, his father's homeland. Before opening Nublu, Ersahin had worked for a decade at the Sweet Basil Jazz Club. The musicians he performed with became part of the Nublu collective. Nublu Club grew out of parties he was throwing at venues in Manhattan where friends performed. He came up with the term "Nublu" to convey his eclectic aesthetic.

The club has a nondescript exterior with a concrete ramp to a blank door. The layout of the club was designed to ensure that music was central to the patrons' experience by placing the performers on floor level in the middle of the long club, as opposed to being up on a stage at one end. When the club briefly lost its license, it closed for one year from 2011 to 2012, during which Nublu events such as Butch Morris and the Nublu Orchestra were held downstairs at Lucky Cheng's on 1st Avenue. Nublu reopened with a new beer and wine license in 2012 at a new location further north on Ave C. The club's return featured one of the Nublu's touchstones, the Sun Ra Arkestra led by Marshall Allen.

== Nublu bands and label ==
The house band was Love Trio, the group Ersahin put together in 2002 with Jesse Murphy and drummer Kenny Wollesen who had worked with him at his Saturday brunch jams at Sweet Basil's in the West Village. Another band at the heart of the Nublu experience in the early days was Wax Poetic, an improvising collective. Their first performances took place at Save the Robots on Avenue B. The recordings featured spoken word from poet Saul Williams. Its first vocalists include Norah Jones, Bebel Gilberto, and Sabina of the Brazilian Girls.

Other Ersahin ensembles that refined their sound at the Nublu club are Wonderland and Our Theory. A key member of the scene was Butch Morris, the creator of Conduction, who led the Nublu Orchestra from the opening of the club until his death in 2013.
