= Not Too Late (Norah Jones song) =

Single by Norah Jones

from the album Not Too Late
- Released: July 17, 2007
- Recorded: 2006
- Studio: Brooklyn Recording (Brooklyn, NY); The Coop (New York, NY)
- Genre: Pop
- Length: 3:31
- Label: Blue Note
- Songwriters: Norah Jones; Lee Alexander
- Producer: Lee Alexander

Norah Jones singles chronology
"Sinkin' Soon" (2007)	"Not Too Late" (2007)	"Be My Somebody" (2007)

Audio
- "Not Too Late" on YouTube

"Not Too Late" is a song recorded by American singer-songwriter Norah Jones for her third studio album of the same title (2007). It was written by Jones and Lee Alexander, and produced by Alexander. A piano-driven pop track, "Not Too Late" lyrically displays an optimistic and hopeful view on love. Critically acclaimed, the song was released as the fourth single from Not Too Late on July 17, 2007, by Blue Note Records, peaking at number 26 on the US Smooth Jazz Songs.

== Writing and recording ==
Produced by Lee Alexander, "Not Too Late" was one of the last songs to be recorded for Not Too Late. Jones wrote most of the lyrics and the music around early 2005, and Alexander helped her finish it near the end of the album's production.

== Critical reception ==
Upon its parent album's release, "Not Too Late" received generally positive reviews from music critics. Andy Strickland of Dotmusic listed the track's "sparse, piano pop" quality among the highlights of Not Too Late. Tom Woods from MusicOMH described the song as "stripped-down, simple and expertly delivered", while praising its chorus line "It's not too late for love" by writing that Jones "manages to legitimise every innocent turn of phrase that comes from her mouth". Writing for PopMatters, Elizabeth Newton emphasized that the album's "hopeful" theme manifests itself most affectingly on "Not Too Late". She further called the song "subtle and understated, touched with simple piano chords, guitar, bass, and drums. Jones's voice is lush, articulate, and soulful." In their review of Not Too Late, a contributor on Sputnikmusic listed the song among the examples of Jones' songwriting excellence.

== Credits and personnel ==
Credits are adapted from the liner notes of Not Too Late.

- Andrew Borger – drums
- Lee Alexander – bass, production, songwriting
- Norah Jones – mellotron, piano, songwriting, vocals

== Charts ==
2007 weekly chart performance for "Not Too Late"
Chart	Peak position
US Smooth Jazz Airplay (Billboard)	26

== Release history ==
Release dates and formats for "Not Too Late"
Region	Date	Format(s)	Label(s)	Ref.
United States	July 17, 2007	Smooth jazz radio	Blue Note	
