= Chasing Pirates =

Single by Norah Jones

from the album The Fall
- Released: October 13, 2009
- Studio: The Coop, New York City; Magic Shop, New York City; Sunset Sound, Hollywood, California; House of David, Nashville, Tennessee
- Genre: Rock
- Length: 2:40
- Label: Blue Note
- Songwriter: Norah Jones
- Producer: Jacquire King

Norah Jones singles chronology
"Until the End" (2007)	"Chasing Pirates" (2009)	"Young Blood" (2010)

Music video
- "Chasing Pirates" on YouTube

"Chasing Pirates" is the first single by American singer Norah Jones from her fourth album, The Fall. It was released exclusively to iTunes on Tuesday, October 13, 2009. The song also had its North American radio station premiere on the defunct 97.3 EZ Rock, now CHBM, in Toronto, Ontario, Canada on October 9, 2009. The song went top ten in Japan, The Netherlands and Belgium. In the US, "Chasing Pirates" peaked at No. 13 on Hot Adult Contemporary Tracks and No. 7 on Jazz Songs.

"Chasing Pirates" was nominated for the Grammy Award for Best Female Pop Vocal Performance at the 53rd Annual Grammy Awards, becoming Jones's third nomination, after "Don't Know Why" and "Sunrise".

== Background ==
Norah Jones explained how "Chasing Pirates" came to be, "About a year ago, I did some demos in my home studio. I had some friends come in and we figured out a cool arrangement for 'Chasing Pirates,' with a cool drum part. It went somewhere I didn't expect it to go, and that became a direction to look in."

== Music video ==
October 27, 2009 VH1 aired the full version of Norah Jones's "Chasing Pirates" music video directed by Rich Lee. In the beginning of the music video, she finds a map of Manhattan in a bottle while sitting on the couch in an apartment complex. In the next scene of the music video, she steers a building from a roof made to look like a pirate ship as she tries to find what is marked on the map. She also sits on deck before the roof transforms into a pirate ship. The music video also gained significant airplay on Australia's channel GO as filler time between programs in late 2009 and early 2010.

== Performances ==
She performed the song live on ABC's Dancing with the Stars on October 20, as well as Late Show with David Letterman on November 11, 2009, Good Morning America on November 16, 2009, The View on November 23, 2009, The Tonight Show with Conan O'Brien on December 15, 2009 and Jimmy Kimmel Live!

== Chart positions ==
The song entered the Adult Album Alternative charts on October 21, 2009 at #13. It became the highest entry by a female artist on that chart since Alanis Morissette's "Everything" in 2004. The last single by a female artist to chart at a higher position was another single by Jones, "Sunrise." The song entered on the Irish Singles Chart for the first time on #39.

=== Weekly charts ===
Chart (2009–2010)	Peak position
Austrian Singles Chart	38
Belgian Singles Chart (Flanders)	21
Belgian Singles Chart (Wallonia)	6
European Hot 100	84
German Singles Chart	66
Irish Singles Chart	39
Italian Singles Chart	21
Norwegian Top Airplays (IFPI)	10
New Zealander Top Airplays	69
Japan Hot 100	4
Swedish Singles Chart	26
Swiss Music Charts	23
UK Singles Chart	87
U.S. Billboard Bubbling Under Hot 100	10
U.S. Billboard Digital Songs	100
U.S. Billboard Jazz Songs	7
U.S. Billboard Adult Alternative Songs	1
U.S. Billboard Adult Contemporary	13
U.S. Billboard Rock Songs	38

=== Year-end charts ===
Chart (2009)	Position
Japan Adult Contemporary (Billboard)	30

Chart (2010)	Position
Belgium (Ultratop Wallonia)	90
Japan Adult Contemporary (Billboard)	38
US Adult Contemporary (Billboard)	36
