= What Am I to You? =

2004 single by Norah Jones

Single by Norah Jones

from the album Feels like Home
- B-side: "Sleepless Nights"; "Sunrise"
- Released: May 10, 2004
- Studio: Allaire (Shokan, New York); Avatar, Sear Sound, Sorcerer Sound (New York City)
- Genre: Soul
- Length: 3:30
- Label: Blue Note
- Songwriter: Norah Jones
- Producers: Lee Alexander; Norah Jones

Norah Jones singles chronology
"Sunrise" (2004)	"What Am I to You?" (2004)	"Those Sweet Words" (2004)

Music video
- "What Am I to You?" on YouTube

"What Am I to You?" is a song written and recorded by American singer-songwriter Norah Jones for her second studio album Feels like Home (2004). It was produced by Jones and Lee Alexander. A soul song, it is written from the perspective of someone questioning whether or not their love for their partner is fully reciprocated. The song was released as the second single from Feels Like Home on May 10, 2004, by Blue Note Records.

== Release and reception ==
=== Original recording ===
"What Am I to You?" was first released as a bonus track on the Japanese version of Come Away with Me in 2003. The song is relatively stripped-down; drum brushes can be heard throughout, along with the guitar, bass, and Jones's vocals and electric piano.

=== Second version ===
The song was reworked before its inclusion on Feels Like Home. This version of the song is played at a slower tempo with a more full-band feel; the drums and particularly the electric guitar are more prominently featured, including a guitar solo instead of the electric piano solo on the original release. The song features The Band musicians Levon Helm on drums and Garth Hudson on the organ. It was released as the second single from Feels Like Home and reached number one on the US Billboard Triple-A chart.

== Music video ==
An accompanying music video for "What Am I to You?" was directed by Quinn Williams. It was released on the bonus DVD of the Feels Like Home deluxe edition. The video consists of footage of Jones and her bandmates performing the song on stage, along with some candid backstage clips.

== Track listings and formats ==
European CD single

1. "What Am I to You?" (album version) – 3:29
2. "Sleepless Nights" – 4:13

Japanese CD single

1. "What Am I to You?" (album version) – 3:29
2. "Sunrise" – 3:20

== Credits and personnel ==
Credits are adapted from the liner notes of Feels Like Home.

- Lee Alexander – bass, production
- Levon Helm – drums
- Garth Hudson – Hammond organ
- Norah Jones – production, songwriting, vocals, Wurlitzer electric piano
- Daru Oda – backing vocals
- Tony Scherr – electric guitar

== Charts ==
=== Weekly charts ===
Weekly chart performance for "What Am I to You?"
Chart (2004)	Peak position
Netherlands (Single Top 100)	66
US Adult Alternative Airplay (Billboard)	1

=== Year-end charts ===
Year-end chart performance for "What Am I to You?"
Chart (2004)	Position
US Triple-A (Billboard)	13

== Release history ==
Release dates and formats for "What Am I to You?"
Region	Date	Format(s)	Label(s)	Ref.
United States	May 10, 2004	Adult album alternative radio	Blue Note	
Japan	May 12, 2004	CD	Toshiba EMI	
Canada	May 25, 2004	CD	Blue Note	
Europe	May 25, 2004	CD	EMI	
United Kingdom	June 28, 2004	CD	Parlophone	
