= Sinkin' Soon =

Single by Norah Jones

from the album Not Too Late
- B-side: "Rosie's Lullaby"
- Released: March 26, 2007
- Recorded: c. 2006
- Studio: Brooklyn Recording; The Coop (New York)
- Genre: Lounge; jazz
- Length: 4:38
- Label: Blue Note
- Songwriters: Lee Alexander; Norah Jones
- Producer: Lee Alexander

Norah Jones singles chronology
"Thinking About You" (2006)	"Sinkin' Soon" (2007)	"Until the End" (2007)

Music video
- "Sinkin' Soon" on YouTube

"Sinkin' Soon" is a song recorded by American singer-songwriter Norah Jones for her third studio album Not Too Late (2007). It was written and produced by Lee Alexander, and co-written by Jones. A cabaret-influenced lounge-jazz track, it is driven by a piano interspersed with a muted trombone. Lyrically sociopolitical, it describes the state of the US at the time of the song's writing through the metaphor of a sinking ship. The song was released as the second single from Not Too Late outside the US on March 26, 2007, by Blue Note Records.

Upon release, "Sinkin' Soon" received widespread acclaim from music critics, predominantly directed towards Jones' progressed songwriting. However, it was a commercial failure, solely reaching the top 40 in Italy. Its accompanying music video, directed by Ace Norton, incorporates stop motion and shows Jones in various miniature settings. Since the song's release, Jones has included it on set lists for all her concert tours.

== Writing and recording ==
Lee Alexander wrote most of "Sinkin' Soon", with Jones composing the bridge. According to Jones, they were unable to play the whole song before they recorded it, so they went out for dinner and drank beer. "I guess we needed a little bit of that drunken sailor vibe because we came back and recorded this on the first take", she elaborated. Jones' old friend J. Walter Hawkes contributed a trombone solo, while M. Ward performed backing vocals. Furthermore, Andrew Borger used pots and pans, including Jones' own teapot, as percussion instruments.

== Music and lyrics ==
"Sinkin' Soon" is composed in the key of E minor, according to the sheet music published by Faber Music. Critical commentaries identified the song as a cabaret-influenced lounge and jazz track. (Note: attributed to Andy Strickland of Dotmusic, Nick Cowen of Drowned in Sound, Sia Michel in Entertainment Weekly, and Tom Woods of MusicOMH) Its musical style received frequent comparisons to works of composer Kurt Weill and singer-songwriter Tom Waits, (Note: attributed to Woods, Jim Caligiuri of The Austin Chronicle, Stephen Thomas Erlewine on AllMusic, John Fordham in The Guardian, the website I Like Music, staff of Los Angeles Times, Jon Pareles in The New York Times, and Sarah Liss of Now) while Dan Aquilante of the New York Post compared it to Louis Armstrong's early recordings. The track's instrumentation incorporates a piano interspersed with a muted trombone, banjo guitar, and pot-and-pan percussion. (Note: attributed to Caligiuri, Michel, Jon Garelick of The Phoenix, Jonathan Keefe of Slant Magazine, and Elizabeth Newton of PopMatters) The song's tempo is a moderate 100 beats per minute in common time, while Jones' vocal range spans one octave and three semitones, from the low note of E_{3} to the high note of G_{4}.

Sociopolitically-themed, "Sinkin' Soon" lyrically compares the United States and its government to a sinking ship. Nick Cowen of Drowned in Sound further insinuated that the song was directed to George W. Bush, then-President of the United States, while Robert Christgau, writing for Rolling Stone, speculated that the lyrical content referred to Hurricane Katrina.

== Critical reception ==
Upon the release of Not Too Late, "Sinkin' Soon" received widespread acclaim from music critics. Nick Cowen of Drowned in Sound, John Fordham for The Guardian, and the website Sputnikmusic all highlighted it as a standout track from the album. Staff of Los Angeles Times emphasized the song as a testament to Jones becoming "an entirely different singer, with an edgy tone and an animated personality". Sarah Liss of Now listed the track among examples of Jones' evolution as a songwriter and a musician, as did Slant Magazine's Jonathan Keefe, who further called it "as feisty as anything in Jones' solo catalogue". Writing for Entertainment Weekly, Sia Michel also praised the song, labeling it as a "catchy hobo-cabaret jam", while Elizabeth Newton from PopMatters complimented its "sassy, mourning" trombone instrumentation.

== Music video ==
Jones with her backing band in the music video for "Sinkin' Soon"

The accompanying music video for "Sinkin' Soon" was directed by Ace Norton, who also directed the music video for Jones' previous single "Thinking About You". It was shot in one day in November 2006, at an industrial strip south of downtown Los Angeles, and incorporates special effects and stop motion. The video premiered via YouTube on March 1, 2007.

The music video for "Sinkin' Soon" begins with various household items in a darkly lit utility room assembling themselves into Jones's backing band. Jones performs the song with the band, as a doll in a doll's house and on a miniature stage, and she dances with an empty tuxedo before performing the song in a mouse hole, dressed in a mouse costume. The video ends with the items assuming their original positions in the room.

== Live performances ==
In 2007, Jones performed "Sinkin' Soon" in concerts promoting Not Too Late, and included it on the set list for the Not Too Late Tour; a live rendition was included on Jones' live album Live from Austin, TX (2008). In October 2010, she performed it at Farm Aid 25. The song was further included on the set lists for The Fall Tour (2010), (Note: attributed to NPR, Robert Price of New Jersey Herald, and Denise Neil of The Wichita Eagle) Little Broken Hearts Tour (2012–2013), Day Breaks World Tour (2016–2017), and Visions Tour (2024–2025). Jones also performed the song with Sasha Dobson during one of Jones' "Live from Home" concerts, in July 2020; the performance was included on the deluxe edition of Jones' seventh studio album Pick Me Up Off the Floor (2020).

== Track listings and formats ==
2-track digital single and European CD single

1. "Sinkin' Soon" (album version) – 4:38
2. "Sinkin' Soon" (live from Rehearsals.com) – 4:17

3-track digital single and European maxi CD single

1. "Sinkin' Soon" (album version) – 4:38
2. "Sinkin' Soon" (live from Rehearsals.com) – 4:17
3. "Rosie's Lullaby" (live from Rehearsals.com) – 4:10

Japanese promotional CD single

1. "Sinkin' Soon" (radio edit) – 3:57

== Credits and personnel ==
Credits are adapted from the liner notes of Not Too Late.

- Lee Alexander – bass, mixing, songwriting, production
- Andrew Borger – drums, pots and pans, slit drum
- Kevin Breit – mandolin
- J. Walter Hawkes – trombone
- Jesse Harris – banjo guitar
- Norah Jones – piano, songwriting, vocals
- Daru Oda – backing vocals
- Tom Schick – engineering, mixing
- M. Ward – backing vocals

== Charts ==
2007 weekly chart performance for "Sinkin' Soon"
Chart	Peak position
Italy (FIMI)	36

== Release history ==
Release dates and formats for "Sinkin' Soon"
Region	Date	Format(s)	Label(s)	Ref.
Various (Note: excluding the US)	March 26, 2007	Digital download (Note: "Sinkin' Soon" was made available for digital download in 2-track and 3-track variants.)	EMI	
Germany	April 27, 2007	Maxi CD	EMI	
