= Feels like Home (Norah Jones album) =

Studio album by Norah Jones
- Released: February 10, 2004
- Recorded: 2003–2004
- Studios: Allaire, Shokan, New York; Avatar, New York City; Sear Sound, New York City; Sorcerer Sound, New York City
- Genre: Alternative country
- Length: 46:26
- Label: Blue Note
- Producers: Arif Mardin; Norah Jones

Norah Jones chronology
New York City (2003)	Feels like Home (2004)	New York City - The Remix Album (2004)

Norah Jones studio album chronology
Come Away with Me (2002)	Feels Like Home (2004)	Not Too Late (2007)

Singles from Feels Like Home
- 1. "Sunrise" Released: January 12, 2004; 2. "What Am I to You?" Released: May 20, 2004; 3. "Creepin' In" Released: June 14, 2004; 4. "Those Sweet Words" Released: February 2005

Feels like Home is the second studio album by American singer-songwriter Norah Jones, released on February 10, 2004, through Blue Note Records. Featuring an alternative country sound, it serves as the follow-up to her 2002 breakthrough album, Come Away with Me. Jones co-wrote five of its songs and worked with Arif Mardin, as the main producer.

The album was received with generally positive reviews from critics, who compared it to her debut. It was also a commercial success, selling over a million copies in its first week and topping the Billboard 200 for six consecutive weeks, becoming the second-best selling album of 2004. It has sold over 12 million copies worldwide.

At the 47th Annual Grammy Awards in 2005, the album received three nominations, Best Pop Vocal Album, while "Sunrise", the album's lead single, won for Best Female Pop Vocal Performance and "Creepin' In", with Dolly Parton, was nominated for Best Country Collaboration with Vocals.

== Critical reception ==
Professional ratings
Aggregate scores
Source	Rating
Metacritic	74/100
Review scores
Source	Rating
AllMusic	4/5 stars
Entertainment Weekly	B
Los Angeles Times	3.5/4 stars
PopMatters	9/10 stars
Robert Christgau	(dud)
Rolling Stone	4/5 stars
The Rolling Stone Album Guide	4/5 stars
The New York Times	(mixed)
USA Today	2.5/4 stars
Yahoo! Music UK	7/10 stars

Feels like Home received generally positive reviews from music critics. At Metacritic, which assigns a normalized rating out of 100 to reviews from mainstream critics, the album has an average score of 74 out of 100, which indicates "generally favorable reviews" based on 19 reviews.

Writing for Yahoo! Music, Ken Micallef gave the album a favorable review and said, "Recalling Come Away With Me only for Jones's sultry voice, the album has its share of pleasant throwaways, but those are balanced by a handful of starkly beautiful and excellently arranged songs." The A.V. Club's Keith Phipps also gave it a favorable review and stated that the album "should neither shock old fans nor disappoint those hoping to hear [Jones] reach for more." E! Online gave it a B+ and said, "Instead of making any stupid concessions to her sudden celebrity... the Home girl plays it cool, carrying on with the same smooth vibes that made her a star." Spin also gave it a B+, calling it "A better record than Come Away--less piano bar, more honkey-tonk." Mojo gave it four stars out of five and said the album was "similar to the debut.... But there's a more vivid light-and-shade to the textures and a craft and depth to the compositions that represent a welcome distillation of Jones' art." The Village Voice gave the album a positive review and stated, "If the choice of songs and beat and instrumentation were sometimes restrictive, still the piano and the voice endured." Blender gave it three-and-a-half stars out of five and said that its mood was "more or less the same, if slight friskier."

Other reviews are average, mixed or negative: Uncut gave the album three stars out of five and stated that, "Yes, it's an unchallenging and even deeply conservative record. But its class is positively aristocratic." The Austin Chronicle gave it two stars out of five and said, "Material is everything to a chanteuse, and in contrast to Come Away With Me, the problem here is that Jones wrote/co-wrote almost half of the Home's 13 tracks." The Guardian only gave it one star out of five and said that the album was "so inoffensive you have trouble remembering whether you put it on."

== Commercial performance ==
Feels like Home sold 1,022,000 copies in its first week of release in the U.S. It sold 395,000 copies in its second week and spent its first six weeks of release atop the Billboard 200. It was the second best-selling album of 2004 in the U.S., selling 3,842,920 copies. It stands as the tenth largest first-week sales for a female artist, behind Adele's 25, Taylor Swift’s 1989 (Taylor’s Version) and Midnights, Britney Spears' Oops...! I Did It Again, Taylor Swift's 1989, Reputation, Red, and Speak Now, and Lady Gaga's Born This Way. In the Netherlands, it was the year's best-selling album and the twenty-fourth best-selling album of the 2000s.

== Track listing ==
Writing credits from AllMusic.

No.	Title	Writer(s)	Length
1.	"Sunrise"	Norah Jones, Lee Alexander	3:20
2.	"What Am I to You?"	Jones	3:29
3.	"Those Sweet Words"	Alexander, Richard Julian	3:22
4.	"Carnival Town"	Jones, Alexander	3:12
5.	"In the Morning"	Adam Levy	4:07
6.	"Be Here to Love Me"	Townes Van Zandt	3:28
7.	"Creepin' In" (featuring Dolly Parton)	Alexander	3:03
8.	"Toes"	Jones, Alexander	3:46
9.	"Humble Me"	Kevin Breit	4:36
10.	"Above Ground"	Andrew Borger, Daru Oda	3:43
11.	"The Long Way Home"	Kathleen Brennan, Tom Waits	3:13
12.	"The Prettiest Thing"	Jones, Alexander, Julian	3:51
13.	"Don't Miss You at All"	Music by Duke Ellington, lyrics by Jones	3:06
Total length:			46:26

Deluxe Edition (CD and DVD)

No.	Title	Writer(s)	Length
14.	"Sleepless Nights"	Felice and Boudleaux Bryant	4:13
15.	"Moon Song"	Alexander; Jones; Levy	2:43
16.	"I Turned Your Picture to the Wall"	George Wyle	3:01
Total length:			56:26

DVD Contents

1. "In the Morning" (live)
2. "She" (live)
3. "Long Way Home" (live)
4. "Creepin' In" (live)
5. "Sunrise" (music video)
6. "What Am I to You?" (music video)
7. Interview with Norah

== Personnel ==
Musicians

- Norah Jones – vocals, piano (1, 3, 4, 6, 8, 12, 13), Wurlitzer electronic piano (2, 5, 10), pump organ (9)
- Garth Hudson – Hammond organ (2), accordion (6)
- Rob Burger – pump organ (3, 7)
- Kevin Breit – acoustic guitar (1, 3, 6, 7, 11, 12), resonator guitar (5, 8–10), banjolin (1), electric guitar and foot tapping (10), backup vocal (6)
- Jesse Harris – acoustic guitar (3, 4)
- Adam R. Levy – electric guitar (6, 8, 10, 11), acoustic guitar (5), backup vocal (1, 6, 7)
- Tony Scherr – electric guitar (2)
- Lee Alexander – acoustic bass (1–3, 5–12), electric bass (5), lap steel (12)
- Brian Blade – drums (12)
- Andrew Borger – drums (5, 6, 8, 10), slit drum (1), box (3, 11), snare drum (7)
- Levon Helm – drums (2)
- Dolly Parton – vocal (7)
- Daru Oda – backup vocals (1, 2, 5–8, 10–12), flutes (11)
- Jane Scarpantoni – cello (4)
- David Gold – viola (4)
- Arif Mardin – string arrangement (4)

Technical

- Producers: Arif Mardin, Norah Jones
- Recording and mixing engineer: Jay Newland
- Assistant engineers: Matthew Cullen, Dick Kondas, Steve Mazur, Aya Takemura
- Mastering: Gene Paul
- Mastering assistant: Jamie Polaski
- A&R: Eliott Wolf
- A&R Assistant: Danny Markowitz
- Product manager: Zach Hochkeppel
- Creative director: Gordon Jee
- Design production assistant: Burton Yount

== Charts ==
=== Weekly charts ===
Chart (2004)	Peak position
Argentine Albums (CAPIF)	3
Australian Albums (ARIA)	2
Australian Jazz & Blues Albums (ARIA)	1
Austrian Albums (Ö3 Austria)	1
Belgian Albums (Ultratop Flanders)	1
Belgian Albums (Ultratop Wallonia)	1
Canadian Albums (Billboard)	1
Czech Albums (ČNS IFPI)	8
Danish Albums (Hitlisten)	1
Dutch Albums (Album Top 100)	1
European Albums (Billboard)	1
Finnish Albums (Suomen virallinen lista)	2
French Albums (SNEP)	1
German Albums (Offizielle Top 100)	1
Greek Albums (IFPI)	1
Hungarian Albums (MAHASZ)	18
Icelandic Albums (Tónlist)	1
Irish Albums (IRMA)	1
Italian Albums (FIMI)	1
Japanese Albums (Oricon)	5
New Zealand Albums (RMNZ)	1
Norwegian Albums (VG-lista)	1
Polish Albums (ZPAV)	1
Portuguese Albums (AFP)	1
Scottish Albums (Official Charts)	1
Singaporean Albums (RIAS)	8
Spanish Albums (PROMUSICAE)	3
Swedish Albums (Sverigetopplistan)	1
Swedish Jazz Albums (Sverigetopplistan)	1
Swiss Albums (Schweizer Hitparade)	1
Taiwanese Albums (Five Music)	11
UK Albums (Official Charts)	1
UK Jazz & Blues Albums (Official Charts)	1
US Billboard 200	1

=== Year-end charts ===
Chart (2004)	Position
Argentine Albums (CAPIF)	12
Australian Albums (ARIA)	10
Australian Jazz & Blues Albums (ARIA)	2
Austrian Albums (Ö3 Austria)	1
Belgian Albums (Ultratop Flanders)	2
Belgian Albums (Ultratop Wallonia)	4
Danish Albums (Hitlisten)	2
Dutch Albums (Album Top 100)	1
European Albums (Billboard)	1
Finnish Albums (Suomen virallinen lista)	70
French Albums (SNEP)	5
German Albums (Offizielle Top 100)	2
Hungarian Albums (MAHASZ)	89
Irish Albums (IRMA)	20
Italian Albums (FIMI)	13
Japanese Albums (Oricon)	55
New Zealand Albums (RMNZ)	3
Portuguese Albums (AFP)	7
Spanish Albums (PROMUSICAE)	45
Swedish Albums (Sverigetopplistan)	4
Swedish Albums & Compilations (Sverigetopplistan)	5
Swiss Albums (Schweizer Hitparade)	2
UK Albums (OCC)	8
US Billboard 200	5
Worldwide Albums (IFPI)	2

Chart (2005)	Position
Australian Jazz & Blues Albums (ARIA)	4
Belgian Albums (Ultratop Flanders)	40
Dutch Albums (Album Top 100)	33
French Albums (SNEP)	189
US Billboard 200	126

Chart (2006)	Position
Australian Jazz & Blues Albums (ARIA)	12
Belgian Midprice Albums (Ultratop Flanders)	2
Belgian Midprice Albums (Ultratop Wallonia)	9

Chart (2007)	Position
Belgian Midprice Albums (Ultratop Flanders)	3
Belgian Midprice Albums (Ultratop Wallonia)	9

Chart (2008)	Position
Belgian Midprice Albums (Ultratop Flanders)	22
Belgian Midprice Albums (Ultratop Wallonia)	28

=== Decade-end charts ===
Chart (2000–2009)	Position
US Billboard 200	58

== Certifications and sales ==
Region	Certification	Certified units/sales
Argentina (CAPIF)	Platinum	40,000^{^}
Australia (ARIA)	3× Platinum	210,000^{^}
Austria (IFPI Austria)	3× Platinum	90,000^{*}
Belgium (BRMA)	2× Platinum	100,000^{*}
Brazil (Pro-Música Brasil)	Gold	50,000^{*}
Canada (Music Canada)	4× Platinum	400,000^{^}
Denmark (IFPI Danmark)	6× Platinum	120,000^{‡}
Finland (Musiikkituottajat)	Gold	16,604
France (SNEP)	2× Platinum	600,000^{*}
Germany (BVMI)	3× Platinum	600,000^{^}
Greece (IFPI Greece)	Gold	10,000^{^}
Ireland (IRMA)	3× Platinum	45,000^{^}
Italy (FIMI) sales since 2009	Gold	25,000^{‡}
Japan (RIAJ)	Platinum	250,000^{^}
Mexico (AMPROFON)	Gold	50,000^{^}
Netherlands (NVPI)	Platinum	239,000
New Zealand (RMNZ)	3× Platinum	45,000^{^}
Poland (ZPAV)	Diamond	100,000^{‡}
Portugal (AFP)	Gold	20,000^{^}
South Korea	—	21,894
Spain (Promusicae)	Platinum	100,000^{^}
Sweden (GLF)	Platinum	60,000^{^}
Switzerland (IFPI Switzerland)	3× Platinum	120,000^{^}
United Kingdom (BPI)	4× Platinum	1,200,000^{‡}
United States (RIAA)	4× Platinum	4,632,000
Summaries
Europe (IFPI)	4× Platinum	4,000,000^{*}
Worldwide	—	12,000,000
^{*} Sales figures based on certification alone.^{^} Shipments figures based on certification alone.^{‡} Sales+streaming figures based on certification alone.
