= Forro in the Dark =

Band based in New York

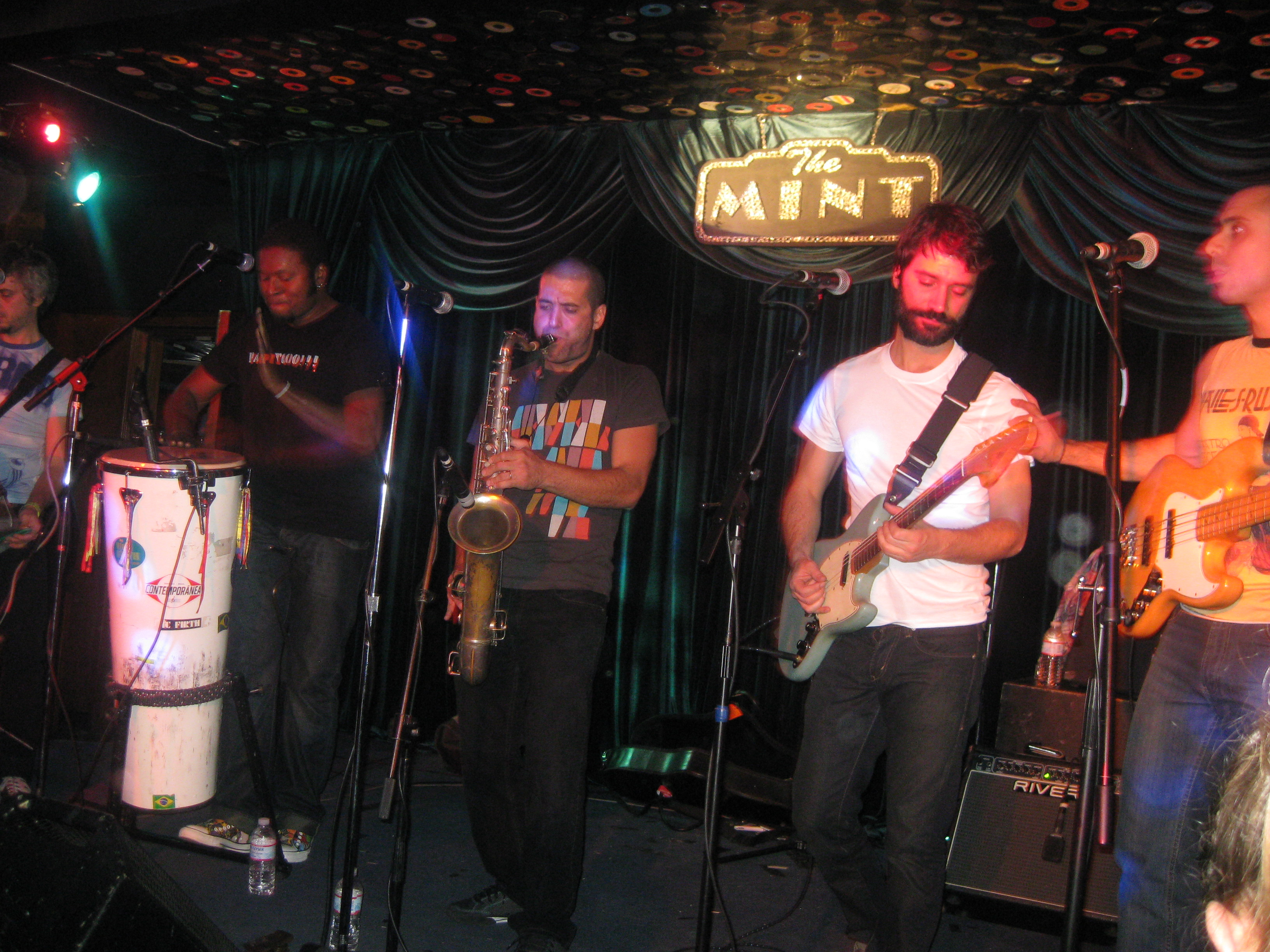
- Forro in the Dark performing in Los Angeles, November 2009

Background information
- Origin: New York, New York, USA, Brazil
- Genres: Rock, worldbeat, world music
- Years active: 2002–present
- Labels: Nat Geo Music, Nublu Records
- Members: Mauro Refosco; Guilherme Monteiro; Jorge Continentino; Davi Vieira
- Website: www.forrointhedark.com

Forro in the Dark is a New York-based collective of Brazilian expatriates that formed in 2002. The group combines the musical style of forró (pronounced "faw-HAW"), "the percussion-heavy, rhythmic dance music" of their native Brazil, with elements of rock, folk, jazz, and country.

== History ==
=== Formation and Bonfires of São João ===
In celebration of his birthday (October 16), Mauro Refosco invited some friends over for a forró-style jam session at Nublu, a nightclub located in the East Village district of New York City. The group was such a hit that they started a weekly residency at the club. Their public prominence increased due to their extended residency at Nublu, where they came into contact with prominent New York influence David Byrne, who helped propel further recognition for the band when they collaborated on Forro in the Dark's 2006 album Bonfires of São João.

In November 2006, Forro in the Dark released their debut album Bonfires of São João, which includes guest performances from Bebel Gilberto, David Byrne and Miho Hatori. In regards to the album, Allmusic noted that "Forro in the Dark hang on tightly to the danceability of the music but are keen to expand the music's sonic parameters. A reggae tune, 'Limoeiro do Norte,' spotlights a wobbly flute up front, while 'Que Que Tu Fez' crosses an insistent Afro-Caribbean rhythm with flamenco handclaps, a flighty flute, and a spry vocal. Guest stars liven up the proceedings: David Byrne vocalizes exuberantly on two tracks, including 'Asa Branca,' a forro standard, and the Brazilian diva Bebel Gilberto donates a rich, sultry lead vocal to the airy ballad 'Wandering Swallow.' Miho Hatori of the band Cibo Matto further blurs the lines by bringing a Japanese pop taste to Gonzaga's 'Paraiba'…"

The group toured throughout the United States, Canada, and Europe in 2007 to promote the album. During this time they recorded the song "City of Immigrants" that was featured on "Steve Earle’s Grammy-winning album Washington Square Serenade".

=== Light a Candle ===
Following the 2008 release of their EP Dia de Roda, Forro in the Dark began work on their second full-length album Light a Candle. Guest artists on the LP include Sabina Sciubba of Brazilian Girls who appears on the track "Silence Is Golden" and singer-songwriter Jesse Harris who provides vocals for the song "Just Like Any Other Night". The album also features covers of forró classics like "Saudades de Manezinho Araujo" by Teo Azevedo and "Forro de Dois Amigos" by Edmilson do Pífano.

SFWeekly regarded the band as "[pushing] the genre [of forró] even further, adding fuzzed-out guitar riffage, turntable scratchery, and breathy, honking sax…and recorded live with only minimal overdubs, giving them a rushing vibrancy…the band's tunes shudder and shake like an epileptic belly dancer."

In 2009, the band collaborated with singer-songwriter Brett Dennen for a live session recording made available on iTunes. Refosco was also announced as the percussionist for Thom Yorke's new live band Atoms for Peace (which also included Flea of the Red Hot Chili Peppers, Joey Waronker of Beck and Nigel Godrich). Refosco joined the Red Hot Chili Peppers touring lineup as a percussionist from 2011 to 2014.

== Musical style ==
As described by Refosco, forró "is a happy, danceable music based on four elements: simple melodies, basic harmonies, driving rhythms and funny lyrics. Those elements are traditionally performed by three instruments: a triangle, an accordion, and a zabumba, a drum pitched somewhere between a low snare and a small bass". The band alternates between these musical components as they include various guitars and other percussion instruments, such as a Bahian drum called the timbau, along with traditional forró components. Continentino plays a variety of wind instruments including a wooden flute called the pífano, instead of the accordion.

Steve Klinge from The Philadelphia Inquirer describes the band as "[updating] and [recontextualizing] the northeastern Brazilian music...forro…it's a frantic, zippy collision of percussion, flute, and electric guitar with an occasional sax solo and lyrics in Portuguese and English. It's polyrhythmic street-party music with a downtown edge."

== Members ==
- Mauro Refosco – zabumba drum
- Guilherme Monteiro – guitar
- Jorge Continentino – pífano flute, saxophone
- Davi Vieira – percussion

All four members participate as vocalists.

== Discography ==
=== Albums ===
- Bonfires of São João (2006)
- Light a Candle (2009)
- Forro in the Dark Plays Zorn (with John Zorn) (2015)
- Sandcastles (2017)

=== EPs ===
- Dia de Roda (2008)
