= Ace Norton =

American film director (born 1982)

- Born: May 24, 1982 (age 44); Venice, California
- Occupations: Film & Video Director
- Years active: 2001-present
- Website: acenorton.com

Ace Norton (born May 24, 1982, in Venice, Los Angeles, California) is a Japanese American filmmaker and artist born and raised in Venice, California. Norton creates music videos, commercials, fashion films, and movies.

== Biography ==
Norton grew up in Venice, and is the son of writer/director Bill Norton Junior and grandson of motion picture screenwriter William Norton Senior.

Norton spent most of high school shooting short films. One of which, "Cherry Coke Rage", won the highest award at the Los Angeles Film Festival. By the end of his high school career Norton had produced over 200 short films. Following graduation Norton attended the University of Southern California (USC) School of Cinema.

At USC Norton began to direct music videos for local Los Angeles bands. While in college Norton and friends (Toben Seymour, Hiro Murai, Charles Spano, Asiel Norton) created Commondeer Films. Using Norton's bedroom as office space, they would spend weekends emailing bands and animating low budget music videos. Commondeer produced over 40 music videos. In 2007, Norton signed to Partizan, then shortly thereafter to Prettybird (London) & Solab (France), & REPRESENT (Germany). Since then, Ace has directed over eighty music videos, television commercials, fashion shorts, and short films.

Norton’s work has appeared in the L.A. Times, The Huffington Post, Nowness, Nylon, Interview, Anthem, Boards, and Promo magazine. Highsnobiety listed him as one of the "Best 10 Directors Working Today". He won Best Film and Best Director at the Milan Fashion Film Festival and awards at Berlin and La Jolla. He was nominated for “Director of the Year” at the MVPA for his video “Hustler,” by Simian Mobile Disco. This also won “Video of the Year” at the ViMus Music Video Awards and is listed as one of the “Top 100 Music Videos of All Time” by NME. His work for Death Cab for Cutie was nominated for a Grammy. His films and videos have also been shown at the Los Angeles Film Festival, SXSW, and festivals in Berlin, Venice, Japan, and England. Norton has served as the president of the jury at the Off Film Festival in Venice, Italy and was a keynote speaker at both LAMVF and in Berlin.

== Videography ==
=== Music videos ===
- Everybody Else – "Rich Girls, Poor Girls" (2003)
- The Waking Hours – "Heartbeat" (2004)
- Sébastien Tellier – "La Ritournelle" (2005)
- The Willowz – "Ulcer Soul" (2005)
- Smoosh – "La Pump" (2005)
- The Faint – "Desperate Guys" (2005)
- A Gun Called Tension – "Gold Fronts" (2005)
- Executive Producer – Neon Blonde – "Headlines" (2005)
- Tahiti 80 – "Chinatown" (2005)
- Death Cab for Cutie – "Crooked Teeth" (2006)
- Death Cab for Cutie – "Someday You Will Be Loved" (2006)
- The Sounds – "Tony the Beat" (2006)
- Peter Walker – "What Do I Know" (2006)
- Smoosh – "Find a Way" (2006)
- Guster – "The New Underground" (2006)
- Teddybears feat. Madcobra – "Cobrastyle" (2006)
- Norah Jones – "Thinking About You" (2006)
- Norah Jones – "Sinkin' Soon" (2007)
- Mandy Moore – "Extraordinary" (2007)
- Mickey Avalon – "Jane Fonda" (2007)
- The Willowz – "Evil Son" (2007)
- Simian Mobile Disco – "Hustler" (2007)
- Aesop Rock – "Coffee" (2007)
- Bloc Party – "Flux" (2007)
- The Mountain Goats – "Sax Rohmer #1" (2007)
- LCD Soundsystem – "Big Ideas" (2007)
- Santogold – "Creator" (2007)
- Sébastien Tellier – "Divine" (2007)
- Does It Offend You, Yeah? – "Dawn of the Dead" (2007)
- She & Him (Zooey Deschanel & M. Ward) – "Why Do You Let Me Stay Here?" (2008)
- The Fray – "Never Say Never" (2009)
- Patrick Wolf – "Hard Times" (2009)
- The Virgins – "Teen Lovers" (2009)
- Felix Cartal – "Volcano" (2010)
- Darwin Deez – "Radar Detector" (2010)
- Scissor Sisters – "Any Which Way" (2010)
- Foster the People – "Helena Beat" (2011)
- Foster the People – "Call It What You Want" (2011)
- Best Coast – "The Only Place" (2012)
- Regina Spektor – "Don't Leave Me (Ne Me Quitte Pas)" (2012)
- Jennifer Lopez featuring Flo Rida – "Goin' In" (2012)
- Robert Glasper Experiment – "Calls" (2013)
- The Knocks – "Comfortable" (2014)
- phantoms – "Broken Halo" (2014)
- phantoms – "voyeur" (2015)
- Vic Mensa – "16 Shots" (2016)

=== Short films ===
- Vacuum (2021)
- All Alone in April (2020)
- Happy Socks x THE RAMONES
- Please Touch the Art- Cantor Fine Art
- NINE LIVES with Elijah wood, Michael Angarano, Mike White, Christian Slater, Melodie Diaz, Niki Reed
- "synchronicity" 2016
- Funny or Die "9 Lives" episode (2010)
- Dewana's Bridal – starring Jaime King and Kick Gurry (2009)
- Electronic Beats – "Soundscapes" (2008)
- Powertape Short – "Oblivions Corner", starring Charles Spano (2009)
- Wake up Call – starring Emile Hirsch (2008)
- God Bless Bloc Party (documentary) (2005)
