= It's Gonna Be =

Single by Norah Jones

from the album The Fall
- Released: April 2010
- Studio: The Coop, New York City; Magic Shop, New York City; Sunset Sound, Hollywood, California; House of David, Nashville, Tennessee
- Length: 3:11
- Label: Blue Note, EMI
- Songwriter: Norah Jones
- Producer: Jacquire King

Norah Jones singles chronology
"Young Blood" (2010)	"It's Gonna Be" (2010)	"Virginia Moon" (2010)

Audio video
- "It's Gonna Be" on YouTube

"It's Gonna Be" is the third single by American singer Norah Jones from her fourth album, The Fall. It was released exclusively in April 2010 for North America. It reached number 11 on the Billboard Triple A chart.

== Promotion ==
Jones performed the song on Later... with Jools Holland on November 5, 2009; as well as on The Ellen DeGeneres Show on April 23, 2010. Jones reappeared on The Ellen DeGeneres Show on June 25 and performed "It's Gonna Be" on the show for a second time. She also performed the song on The Tonight Show with Jay Leno on August 31, 2010.

== Charts ==
Chart (2010)	Peak position
US Adult Alternative Airplay (Billboard)	11
