= Not Too Late (album) =

2007 studio album by Norah Jones

Studio album by Norah Jones
- Released: January 30, 2007
- Recorded: Summer 2005–Fall 2006
- Studios: The Coop, Brooklyn Recording, New York City
- Length: 45:22
- Label: Blue Note
- Producer: Lee Alexander

Norah Jones chronology
The Chill Album (2005)	Not Too Late (2007)	Live from Austin, Texas (2008)

Norah Jones studio album chronology
Feels Like Home (2004)	Not Too Late (2007)	The Fall (2009)

Alternative cover
- Deluxe edition cover

Singles from Not Too Late
- 1. "Thinking About You" Released: December 5, 2006; 2. "Sinkin' Soon" Released: March 26, 2007; 3. "Until the End" Released: May 21, 2007; 4. "Not Too Late" Released: July 17, 2007; 5. "Be My Somebody" Released: July 17, 2007

Not Too Late is the third studio album by American singer-songwriter Norah Jones, released on January 30, 2007, through Blue Note Records. It was produced by Lee Alexander, the songwriter and bassist featured on Jones's previous albums, Come Away with Me (2002) and Feels Like Home (2004). The album debuted at number one on the Billboard 200, making it Jones' third consecutive number one album.

== Background and recording ==
Jones wrote most of the songs on the album when she was on tour during 2004 and 2005; for example, "Until the End" was written in the South Pacific, "Rosie's Lullaby" in Australia, and "The Sun Doesn't Like You" in Brazil. Jones wrote "Thinking About You" in 1999 with Ilhan Ersahin, her then-bandmate in Wax Poetic, but she thought it was too much of a pop song for her to record and rejected a version she recorded for Feels like Home. Jones had an acoustic guitar with her on the tour and wrote more songs with it than she previously had: "The guitar is simple and a lot easier to carry than a piano", she said.

After the tour concluded, Jones began recording the album with Alexander, who "tweak[ed]" the lyrics of the songs and "pulled [them] into better shape", according to Jones. Not Too Late was mostly recorded at Jones's home studio and is the first album Jones recorded without producer Arif Mardin, who died in the summer of 2006. Jones described the sessions as "fun, relaxed and easy" and without a deadline; executives at Blue Note Records reportedly did not know they were recording an album. Many of the sessions were "spur of the moment", with friends of Jones and musicians they recommended being asked to play. The album features guest appearances by organist Larry Goldings, singer-songwriter M. Ward, and Kronos Quartet cellist Jeff Ziegler. Jones said the songs on the album are "not so cut-and-dried" compared to her earlier material and have "a twist to them". In contrast to her previous albums, the piano, organ and Wurlitzer are not as prominent as the guitar: "the piano is always loud in the mix, but I've never been into it being the main rhythm instrument unless we're playing something funky. I've always liked the guitar as the rhythmic instrument", Jones explained.

== Critical reception ==
Professional ratings
Aggregate scores
Source	Rating
Metacritic	68/100
Review scores
Source	Rating
AllMusic	3/5 stars
Entertainment Weekly	B−
The Guardian	3/5 stars
Los Angeles Times	3/4 stars
The Observer	4/5 stars
PopMatters	(7/10)
Rolling Stone	3/5 stars
Slant Magazine	"
Sputnikmusic	3.5/5 stars
Stylus	B−

Not Too Late received generally positive reviews from music critics. At Metacritic, which assigns a normalized rating out of 100 to reviews from mainstream critics, the album has an average score of 68 out of 100, which indicates "generally favorable reviews" based on 23 reviews.

Mojo gave the album four stars out of five and said that its majority "hums with a placid darkness and neurosis which is as delicious as it is unexpected." Uncut also gave it four stars and said, "What's especially daring about Not Too Late is the degree to which Jones and [producer Lee] Alexander trust their songs and her languorous voice to hold the listener's interest." musicOMH likewise gave it four stars and said that "This collection of quaint, feel-good numbers is not going to set the world alight, but it offers something warm and comforting to come home to." Now gave it the similar four stars out of five score and called it "A very good showcase for Jones's evolution as a writer and musician." The Phoenix gave it three stars out of four and said of Jones, "Too good to hate, not exciting enough to love, she still makes most of what’s out there sound like phony baloney." Hartford Courant gave it a positive review and also said of Jones, "Subtlety was a defining characteristic of her first two records, and it carries over onto 'Not Too Late,' where even the differences are understated and discreet."

Other reviews are average or mixed: The Austin Chronicle gave the album three stars out of five and said, "Jones has concocted a pleasing effort underneath its delicate air." Yahoo! Music UK gave it six stars out of ten and called it "Norah's most personal collection of songs to date." Drowned in Sound likewise gave it a score of six out of ten and said that while the album "is a shade darker than her mega-selling, Grammy-winning template, it's highly unlikely to win all that many new converts, and fans may find this album a little bit of a slog in places." Q gave it three stars out of five and said, "With a surfeit of samey country-rock ballads, Not Too Late ultimately proves rather a long haul." Blender gave the album two stars out of five and said that "the results are a mutant virus of gorgeous and bland, grainy and slick." The Village Voice gave it a mixed review and stated that Jones' voice "is still 'that voice,' but gravity was never what made it fly."

=== Accolades ===
By January 29, 2007, the album had become the most pre-ordered album of all time on Amazon.com, and was Jones' second album (Feels like Home) to reach Amazon's all-time top ten pre-order list.

The first single from the album was "Thinking About You", which was released in the U.S. in early December 2006 and was one of the first songs by a major artist to be available for paid digital download in mp3 format. "Not Too Late" was released as a radio single in Taiwan in early 2007. For the week beginning January 23, the entire album was streamed on VH1.com's "Hear Music First" program. Jones recorded an hour-long performance for UK BBC radio and television that was aired in late January, and she performed via simulcast on the feature Live@BT: Norah Jones for Canada's Citytv in early February. The third single from the album was "Sinkin' Soon", released in March.

Jones was scheduled to embark on a twenty-two date concert tour of North America, beginning on April 13 and ending on May 12. One of the dates was to take place at the New Orleans Jazz & Heritage Festival, on April 28. On February 16, 2008, Not Too Late re-entered the Greek International Albums Chart at number fourteen and climbed to number thirteen the next week. On August 18, the album returned to the top ten on the French Albums Chart and reached number seven.

== Commercial performance ==
Not Too Late debuted at number one on the U.S. Billboard 200 with first-week sales of 405,000. According to Nielsen SoundScan, it was the 18th highest selling album of 2007 in the US, with 1.5 million copies sold. In the United Kingdom, it entered the UK Albums Chart at number one, becoming the 800th number-one album in the history of the chart; it sold 60,500 copies in its first week. It debuted at number five in Japan, opening with sales of 36,400 copies; in Canada, the album entered at number one with opening week sales of 36,000. In Australia, it entered the ARIA Albums Chart at number two and was certified gold with shipments of 35,000 copies. The album reached number one in seventeen countries, including Germany and France. (For more information, see Charts.) According to a press release from EMI, Not Too Late is certified gold or platinum in twenty-one countries as of February 2007. In February, the IFPI awarded the album a platinum certification for shipping one million copies in Europe.

== Track listing ==
No.	Title	Writer(s)	Length
1.	"Wish I Could"	Norah Jones, Lee Alexander	4:17
2.	"Sinkin' Soon"	Jones, Alexander	4:37
3.	"The Sun Doesn't Like You"	Jones, Alexander	2:59
4.	"Until the End"	Jones, Alexander	3:55
5.	"Not My Friend"	Jones	2:54
6.	"Thinking About You"	Jones, Ilhan Ersahin	3:20
7.	"Broken"	Jones, Alexander	3:20
8.	"My Dear Country"	Jones	3:24
9.	"Wake Me Up"	Jones, Alexander	2:46
10.	"Be My Somebody"	Jones	3:36
11.	"Little Room"	Jones	2:43
12.	"Rosie's Lullaby"	Jones, Daru Oda	3:56
13.	"Not Too Late"	Jones, Alexander	3:31
Total length:			45:22

Japanese edition bonus tracks
No.	Title	Writer(s)	Length
14.	"2 Men"	Jones, Alexander	2:30

=== Deluxe version DVD-Video ===
1. "Thinking About You" – music video
2. "Sinkin' Soon" – music video
3. "Until the End" – music video
4. "Thinking About You" – Making of....
5. "Sinkin' Soon" – Making of....
6. "Until the End" – live performance filmed in Burbank, CA, in November 2006
7. "Sinkin' Soon" – live performance filmed in Burbank, CA, in November 2006
8. "12 minutes interview" – with Norah Jones

== Personnel ==
Musicians

- Norah Jones − vocals, piano (tracks 2–5, 8, 13, 14), Wurlitzer electric piano (6, 10, 12), electric guitar (7), acoustic guitar (9, 11), pump organ (9), Mellotron (13, 14)
- Lee Alexander − bass (except 1, 6, 8, 10), electric bass (6, 10), lap steel guitar (9)
- Andrew Borger − drums (exc. 1, 5–8, 11), "slit drum, pots and pans" (2), marimba and cymbal (5)
- Jesse Harris − acoustic guitar (1–5), "guitJo" (2)
- Adam Levy − electric guitar (3–5, 12), vocals (12)

plus

- Julia Kent − cello (1 pizzicato, 7)
- Jeffrey Zeigler − cello (1 bowed)
- Daru Oda − vocals (2, 12), whistling (11)
- M. Ward − vocals (2)
- Kevin Breit − mandolin (2)
- J. Walter Hawkes − trombone (2, 8)
- Devin Greenwood − Hammond B3 (2)
- Paul Bryan − Chamberlin (3)
- Larry Goldings − Hammond B3 (4, 8, 10)
- Rob Sudduth − tenor saxophone (6)
- Chuck MacKinnon − trumpet (6)
- Tony Mason − drums (6)
- Bill McHenry − tenor saxophone (8)
- Jose Davila − tuba (8)
- Richard Julian − vocals (10)
- Tony Scherr − electric guitar (10)
- Robbie McIntosh − electric guitar (12 solo)

Technical

- Lee Alexander − producer, mixing
- Tom Schick − recording engineer, mixing
- Greg Calbi − mastering
- Josh Gold − product manager
- Gordon H. Jee − creative director
- Carla Leighton − art direction, design
- Todd Chalfant − photography
- Melanie Little Gomez − paintings
- Eli Wolf − A&R

== Charts ==
=== Weekly charts ===
Weekly chart performance for Not Too Late
Chart (2007)	Peak position
Argentinian Albums (CAPIF)	1
Australian Albums (ARIA)	2
Australian Jazz & Blues Albums (ARIA)	1
Austrian Albums (Ö3 Austria)	1
Belgian Albums (Ultratop Flanders)	1
Belgian Albums (Ultratop Wallonia)	1
Canadian Albums (Billboard)	1
Croatian Albums (HDU)	1
Czech Albums (ČNS IFPI)	3
Danish Albums (Hitlisten)	1
Dutch Albums (Album Top 100)	1
European Albums (Billboard)	1
Finnish Albums (Suomen virallinen lista)	1
French Albums (SNEP)	1
German Albums (Offizielle Top 100)	1
Greek Albums (IFPI)	5
Hungarian Albums (MAHASZ)	1
Irish Albums (IRMA)	2
Italian Albums (FIMI)	5
Japanese Albums (Oricon)	5
New Zealand Albums (RMNZ)	1
Norwegian Albums (VG-lista)	1
Polish Albums (ZPAV)	1
Portuguese Albums (AFP)	5
Scottish Albums (Official Charts)	3
Spanish Albums (Promusicae)	3
Swedish Albums (Sverigetopplistan)	1
Swedish Jazz Albums (Sverigetopplistan)	1
Swiss Albums (Schweizer Hitparade)	1
UK Albums (Official Charts)	1
UK Jazz & Blues Albums (Official Charts)	1
US Billboard 200	1

=== Year-end charts ===
2007 year-end chart performance for Not Too Late
Chart (2007)	Position
Argentine Albums (CAPIF)	15
Australian Albums (ARIA)	48
Australian Jazz & Blues Albums (ARIA)	2
Austrian Albums (Ö3 Austria)	11
Belgian Albums (Ultratop Flanders)	7
Belgian Albums (Ultratop Wallonia)	17
Dutch Albums (Album Top 100)	8
European Albums (Billboard)	6
Finnish Albums (Suomen virallinen lista)	53
French Albums (SNEP)	14
German Albums (Offizielle Top 100)	5
Hungarian Albums (MAHASZ)	28
Italian Albums (FIMI)	39
Japanese Albums (Oricon)	60
New Zealand Albums (RMNZ)	35
Swedish Albums (Sverigetopplistan)	11
Swiss Albums (Schweizer Hitparade)	6
UK Albums (OCC)	76
US Billboard 200	18
Worldwide Albums (IFPI)	10

2008 year-end chart performance for Not Too Late
Chart (2008)	Position
Australian Jazz & Blues Albums (ARIA)	18

2009 year-end chart performance for Not Too Late
Chart (2009)	Position
Australian Jazz & Blues Albums (ARIA)	36

2010 year-end chart performance for Not Too Late
Chart (2010)	Position
Australian Jazz & Blues Albums (ARIA)	20

2011 year-end chart performance for Not Too Late
Chart (2011)	Position
Australian Jazz & Blues Albums (ARIA)	22

2012 year-end chart performance for Not Too Late
Chart (2012)	Position
Australian Jazz & Blues Albums (ARIA)	46

== Certifications and sales ==
Certifications for Not Too Late
Region	Certification	Certified units/sales
Argentina (CAPIF) Album	Platinum	40,000^{^}
Argentina (CAPIF) Video	Gold	4,000^{^}
Australia (ARIA)	Platinum	70,000^{^}
Austria (IFPI Austria)	2× Platinum	40,000^{*}
Belgium (BRMA)	2× Platinum	100,000^{*}
Brazil (Pro-Música Brasil)	Gold	30,000^{*}
Canada (Music Canada)	2× Platinum	200,000^{^}
Denmark (IFPI Danmark)	Gold	20,000^{^}
France (SNEP)	Platinum	200,000^{*}
Germany (BVMI)	Platinum	200,000^{^}
Hungary (MAHASZ)	Gold	3,000^{^}
Ireland (IRMA)	Gold	7,500^{^}
Japan (RIAJ)	Gold	100,000^{^}
New Zealand (RMNZ)	Gold	7,500^{^}
Poland (ZPAV)	Platinum	20,000^{*}
Portugal (AFP)	Gold	10,000^{^}
Russia (NFPF)	Gold	10,000^{*}
South Korea	—	11,616
Spain (Promusicae)	Gold	40,000^{^}
Sweden (GLF)	Gold	20,000^{^}
Switzerland (IFPI Switzerland)	2× Platinum	60,000^{^}
Turkey (Mü-Yap)	Platinum	10,000^{*}
United Kingdom (BPI)	Gold	100,000^{^}
United States (RIAA)	2× Platinum	2,000,000^{^}
Summaries
Europe (IFPI)	Platinum	1,000,000^{*}
Worldwide	—	5,000,000
^{*} Sales figures based on certification alone.^{^} Shipments figures based on certification alone.
