= Young Blood (Norah Jones song) =

Single by Norah Jones

from the album The Fall
- Released: February 16, 2010
- Studio: The Coop, New York City; Magic Shop, New York City; Sunset Sound, Hollywood, California; House of David, Nashville, Tennessee
- Length: 3:38
- Label: Blue Note
- Songwriter(s): Norah Jones
- Producer(s): Jacquire King

Norah Jones singles chronology
"Chasing Pirates" (2009)	"Young Blood" (2010)	"It's Gonna Be" (2010)

Music video
- "Young Blood" on YouTube

"Young Blood" is the second single by American singer Norah Jones from her fourth album, The Fall. It was released exclusively on February 16, 2010, for North America, Europe (minus the UK) and Japan.

== Music video ==
The music video was made available on iTunes on 30 March 2010. Fuse TV named the video its "Video of the Day" on April 9, 2010.

== Charts ==
Chart (2010)	Peak position
Japan (Japan Hot 100)	33
