= The Fall (Norah Jones album) =

Studio album by Norah Jones
- Released: November 11, 2009
- Recorded: 2008–2009
- Studios: The Coop, New York City; Magic Shop, New York City; Sunset Sound, Hollywood, California; House of David, Nashville, Tennessee
- Genre: Rock
- Length: 45:49
- Label: Blue Note
- Producer: Jacquire King

Norah Jones chronology
| Not Too Late (2007) | The Fall (2009) | ... Featuring Norah Jones (2010) |

Singles from The Fall
- 1. "Chasing Pirates" Released: October 13, 2009; 2. "Young Blood" Released: February 16, 2010; 3. "Stuck" Released: March 5, 2010 (UK); 4. "It's Gonna Be" Released: April 2010

The Fall is the fourth studio album by American singer-songwriter Norah Jones, released on November 11, 2009, by Blue Note Records. The album debuted at number three on the Billboard 200, selling 180,000 copies in its first week. As of August 2012, the album had sold over three million copies worldwide.

== Background and production ==
Before the album's release, Jones' website stated that she had taken a new direction, with new collaborators and producer Jacquire King. King hired songwriters Ryan Adams and Will Sheff, in addition to drummers Joey Waronker, James Gadson and Marco Giovino, keyboardist James Poyser, and guitarists Marc Ribot, Smokey Hormel, Lyle Workman, and Peter Atanasoff and bassists Frank Howard Swart and Dave Wilder. The album cover was taken by photographer Autumn de Wilde.

== Singles and promotion ==
- The first single, "Chasing Pirates", was released on October 13, 2009.
- "Young Blood" was released as the second single in North America, Europe (minus the UK), and Japan. The music video was made available at iTunes on 30 March 2010. The song has reached No. 33 on the Japan Hot 100.
- "Stuck" was released as the second single on March 5, 2010, in the UK (digital download only).
- "It's Gonna Be" was released as the third single in North America in April 2010. It charted on the Billboard Triple A Chart and peaked on the airplay chart at No. 11 in April 2010. Jones performed the song on The Ellen DeGeneres Show.

To promote the release of the album Jones appeared on:

- Dancing with the Stars – October 20, 2009
- Later with Jools Holland – November 3, 2009
- Late Show with David Letterman – November 11, 2009
- Good Morning America – November 16, 2009
- The Colbert Report – November 18, 2009
- The View – November 23, 2009
- France Inter live in Paris – December 7, 2009
- The Tonight Show with Conan O'Brien – December 15, 2009
- Jimmy Kimmel Live! – December 16, 2009
- A Prairie Home Companion – December 19, 2009
- Chelsea Lately – December 21, 2009
- 13 heures February 10, 2010
- Skavlan February 12, 2010
- Q TV April 2010
- The Ellen DeGeneres Show – April 23, 2010
- Good Morning America – June 11, 2010 (with Sarah McLachlan)
- The Ellen DeGeneres Show – June 25, 2010
- The Tonight Show with Jay Leno – August 31, 2010
- The Late Late Show with Craig Ferguson – September 10, 2010
- Late Night with Jimmy Fallon – October 26, 2010

== Reception ==
Professional ratings
Aggregate scores
| Source | Rating |
|---|---|
| Metacritic | 73/100 |
Review scores
| Source | Rating |
| AllMusic | 4.5/5 stars |
| The A.V. Club | B |
| Chicago Tribune | 2.5/4 stars |
| Entertainment Weekly | B− |
| PopMatters | 5/10 |
| Robert Christgau | (choice cut) |
| Rolling Stone | 3.5/5 stars |
| Slant Magazine | 3/5 stars |
| USA Today | 3/4 stars |
| The Washington Post | Mixed |

The Fall received generally positive reviews from music critics. At Metacritic, which assigns a normalized rating out of 100 to reviews from mainstream critics, the album has an average score of 73 out of 100, which indicates "generally favorable reviews" based on 22 reviews.

Billboard gave the album a score of 83 out of 100 and stated that "Jones ditches the gentle piano-playing of her previous work and rises to a new level of creative boldness." The New York Times gave it a favorable review and called it "the sonic and emotional expansion [Jones'] music needed, and it's tied to some of her most unguarded songs." Uncut gave it four stars out of five and said that "The emotional imprint... moves beyond the pining, wistful tones that are [Jones'] trademark in favor of Sex And The City scenarios bursting with heartbreak, regret and emotional devastation." Q also gave it four stars out of five and praised the album for its "copper-bottomed classics". musicOMH likewise gave it four stars out of five and said, "Less predictable was her now clear desire to take risks and step off the all-too-well-forged path of safe, agreeable background music. Instead, on The Fall Norah Jones chooses to defy categorization." Hot Press gave it a score of four out of five with the header: "Easy listening princess goes indie-goth." The Boston Globe gave it a favorable review and stated that Jones "seems liberated from the expectations of what her music is supposed to sound like, and the album is flush with fresh production ideas and a varied sonic palette."

Filter gave the album a score of 78% and stated that "unlike Not Too Late, Jones’ latest decision to ditch her keys for strings is a poor one. In a way, she has indeed found a different beat to groove to, and if anyone can play in a piano bar without a piano, it would certainly be Norah Jones." Paste gave it a score of 7.6 out of 10 and stated that "Jones is clearly comfortable with where she’s arrived, and is ready to throw open the doors for a party." Spin gave it a score of seven out of ten and said that the album "has been billed as Norah Jones' rock album. In fact, it's something even more surprising: a hot-blooded soul record from the queen of the even keel."

Other reviews are average or mixed: The Austin Chronicle gave the album three stars out of five and said it "offers many new sides to Jones while remaining comfortably close to the jazz diva many adore." Yahoo! Music UK gave it six stars out of ten and stated that "If the hardcore fanbase feel a blanch coming on, this isn't all wilful eclecticism gone mad. [Jacquire] King's work is The Fall's unifying factor that keeps it cohesive." Mojo gave it three stars out of five and said that "The wrong kind of sonic adventure undermines about half the songs." The Guardian also gave it three stars out of five and stated that "Jones's cashmere voice sounds more polite than ever, creating an overriding impression of a nice girl keeping dirty company." Under the Radar gave it five stars out of ten and called it "intelligent, tasteful, and well-executed music. But it ain't rock 'n' roll, not even a little, and damn Jones for trying to pretend that it is."

== Track listing ==
All tracks are written by Norah Jones, except where noted.

| No. | Title | Writer(s) | Length |
|---|---|---|---|
| 1. | "Chasing Pirates" | | 2:40 |
| 2. | "Even Though" | Jones; Jesse Harris | 3:52 |
| 3. | "Light as a Feather" | Jones; Ryan Adams | 3:52 |
| 4. | "Young Blood" | Jones; Mike Martin | 3:38 |
| 5. | "I Wouldn't Need You" | | 3:30 |
| 6. | "Waiting" | | 3:31 |
| 7. | "It's Gonna Be" | | 3:11 |
| 8. | "You've Ruined Me" | | 2:45 |
| 9. | "Back to Manhattan" | | 4:09 |
| 10. | "Stuck" | Jones; Will Sheff | 5:15 |
| 11. | "December" | | 3:05 |
| 12. | "Tell Yer Mama" | Jones; Harris; Richard Julian | 3:25 |
| 13. | "Man of the Hour" | | 2:56 |
| Total length: | | | 45:49 |

Japanese edition bonus tracks
| No. | Title | Length |
|---|---|---|
| 14. | "Her Red Shoes" | 3:14 |
| 15. | "Can't Stop" | 4:02 |

Amazon MP3 bonus track
| No. | Title | Length |
|---|---|---|
| 14. | "Can't Stop" | 4:02 |

Target + iTunes/Japan/Brazil deluxe bonus disc (Live at The Living Room)
| No. | Title | Writer(s) | Length |
|---|---|---|---|
| 1. | "It's Gonna Be" | | 3:25 |
| 2. | "Waiting" | | 3:33 |
| 3. | "You've Ruined Me" | | 2:56 |
| 4. | "Jesus, etc." (Wilco cover) | Jay Bennett; Jeff Tweedy | 3:46 |
| 5. | "Cry! Cry! Cry!" (Johnny Cash cover) | Johnny Cash | 3:15 |
| 6. | "Strangers" (The Kinks cover) | Dave Davies | 3:35 |

== Personnel ==
- Norah Jones – vocals, piano (2, 5, 6, 8, 9, 11, 14), Wurlitzer electric piano (1, 7), acoustic guitar (3, 4, 9), electric guitar (3–6, 8, 10, 12), tack piano (9), glockenspiel (6)
- John Kirby – synthesizer (1–3, 10 strings), tack piano (1), piano (2, 10), Casio (3)
- James Poyser – Wurlitzer electric piano (1), organ (8)
- Matt Stanfield – programming (1, 11), synthesizer (11)
- Zac Rae – synthesizer (3), Rhodes electric piano, vibraphone, marimba (4), organ (5, 9, 12), Marxophone (8), clavinet (12)
- Sam Cohen – electric guitar (1, 5, 9)
- Smokey Hormel – electric guitar (1)
- Peter Atanasoff – electric guitar (2, 7, 10)
- Sasha Dobson – acoustic guitar (3)
- Lyle Workman – acoustic guitar (4), electric guitar (12)
- Marc Ribot – electric guitar (8, 10), banjo (10)
- Jon Graboff – pedal steel guitar (9)
- Frank Howard Swart – bass (1, 8)
- Dave Wilder – bass (2, 3, 10)
- Gus Seyffert – bass (4, 5, 9, 12)
- Catherine Popper – bass (6)
- Tony Scherr – bass (7)
- Marco Giovino – drums (1, 8)
- Robert Di Pietro – drums (1 additional, 6, 7)
- Pete McNeal – drums (2, 3, 10)
- Joey Waronker – drums (4, 12)
- James Gadson – drums (9)
- Will Sayles – percussion (2–4, 7)
- Mike Martin – backing vocals (4)

On Live at The Living Room

- Norah Jones – vocals, piano (2, 3, 6), Wurlitzer electric piano (1), electric guitar (4, 5)
- Sasha Dobson – electric guitar (1–3), acoustic guitar (4–6), backing vocals
- Smokey Hormel – electric guitar
- Gus Seyffert – bass (exc. 6), acoustic guitar (6), backing vocals
- Greg Wieczorek – drums (exc. 5)

Production

- Jacquire King – producer, recording, mixing
- Brad Bivens – additional recording
- Brian Thorn, Morgan Stratton – recording assistants
- Tom Schick – additional production (6, 9), additional engineer (3, 6, 9, 11), mixing (Live at The Living Room)
- Jon Stinson – mixing assistant
- Stephen Clemmer, Jimi Zhivago – recording engineer (Live at The Living Room)
- Steven Ha – live sound mix (Live at The Living Room)
- David Schoenwetter, Chris Allen – mixing assistants (Live at The Living Room)
- Greg Calbi – mastering
- Autumn de Wilde – photography
- Gordon H. Jee – creative director
- Frank Harkins – art direction, design

== Charts ==
=== Weekly charts ===
Weekly chart performance for The Fall
| Chart (2009–2010) | Peak position |
|---|---|
| Australian Albums (ARIA) | 17 |
| Australian Jazz & Blues Albums (ARIA) | 1 |
| Austrian Albums (Ö3 Austria) | 3 |
| Belgian Albums (Ultratop Flanders) | 3 |
| Belgian Albums (Ultratop Wallonia) | 1 |
| Canadian Albums (Billboard) | 3 |
| Czech Albums (ČNS IFPI) | 3 |
| Danish Albums (Hitlisten) | 9 |
| Dutch Albums (Album Top 100) | 5 |
| European Albums (Billboard) | 3 |
| Finnish Albums (Suomen virallinen lista) | 21 |
| French Albums (SNEP) | 5 |
| German Albums (Offizielle Top 100) | 3 |
| Greek International Albums (IFPI) | 5 |
| Hungarian Albums (MAHASZ) | 17 |
| Irish Albums (IRMA) | 20 |
| Italian Albums (FIMI) | 17 |
| Japanese Albums (Oricon) | 6 |
| Mexican Albums (Top 100 Mexico) | 67 |
| New Zealand Albums (RMNZ) | 10 |
| Norwegian Albums (VG-lista) | 14 |
| Polish Albums (ZPAV) | 9 |
| Portuguese Albums (AFP) | 7 |
| Scottish Albums (Official Charts) | 27 |
| Spanish Albums (Promusicae) | 15 |
| Swedish Albums (Sverigetopplistan) | 2 |
| Swedish Jazz Albums (Sverigetopplistan) | 1 |
| Swiss Albums (Schweizer Hitparade) | 1 |
| UK Albums (Official Charts) | 24 |
| UK Jazz & Blues Albums (Official Charts) | 1 |
| US Billboard 200 | 3 |
| US Top Rock Albums (Billboard) | 1 |

=== Year-end charts ===
2009 year-end chart performance for The Fall
| Chart (2009) | Position |
|---|---|
| Australian Jazz & Blues Albums (ARIA) | 4 |
| Belgian Albums (Ultratop Flanders) | 61 |
| Belgian Albums (Ultratop Wallonia) | 59 |
| Danish Albums (Hitlisten) | 37 |
| Dutch Albums (Album Top 100) | 64 |
| French Albums (SNEP) | 42 |
| Polish Albums (ZPAV) | 66 |
| Swedish Albums (Sverigetopplistan) | 60 |
| Swiss Albums (Schweizer Hitparade) | 43 |

2010 year-end chart performance for The Fall
| Chart (2010) | Position |
|---|---|
| Australian Jazz & Blues Albums (ARIA) | 6 |
| Austrian Albums (Ö3 Austria) | 66 |
| Belgian Albums (Ultratop Flanders) | 36 |
| Belgian Albums (Ultratop Wallonia) | 19 |
| Canadian Albums (Billboard) | 21 |
| Dutch Albums (Album Top 100) | 81 |
| European Albums (Billboard) | 29 |
| French Albums (SNEP) | 107 |
| Swiss Albums (Schweizer Hitparade) | 44 |
| US Billboard 200 | 28 |
| US Top Rock Albums (Billboard) | 2 |

2011 year-end chart performance for The Fall
| Chart (2011) | Position |
|---|---|
| Australian Jazz & Blues Albums (ARIA) | 47 |

2012 year-end chart performance for The Fall
| Chart (2012) | Position |
|---|---|
| Australian Jazz & Blues Albums (ARIA) | 47 |

== Certifications ==
Certifications for The Fall
| Region | Certification | Certified units/sales |
|---|---|---|
| Argentina (CAPIF) | Platinum | 40,000^{^} |
| Australia (ARIA) | Gold | 35,000^{^} |
| Austria (IFPI Austria) | Gold | 10,000^{*} |
| Belgium (BRMA) | Platinum | 30,000^{*} |
| Canada (Music Canada) | Platinum | 80,000^{^} |
| Denmark (IFPI Danmark) | Gold | 15,000^{^} |
| France (SNEP) | Platinum | 100,000^{*} |
| Germany (BVMI) | Gold | 100,000^{^} |
| Hungary (MAHASZ) | Gold | 3,000^{^} |
| Italy (FIMI) | Gold | 30,000^{*} |
| Japan (RIAJ) | Gold | 100,000^{^} |
| New Zealand (RMNZ) | Gold | 7,500^{^} |
| Poland (ZPAV) | Platinum | 20,000^{*} |
| United Kingdom (BPI) | Gold | 100,000^{^} |
| United States (RIAA) | Platinum | 1,000,000^{^} |
^{*} Sales figures based on certification alone.^{^} Shipments figures based on certification alone.

== Release history ==
Release history for The Fall
| Region | Date | Format | Label | Ref. |
|---|---|---|---|---|
| Japan | November 11, 2009 | CD; LP; digital download | EMI | |
| Germany | November 13, 2009 | CD; LP; digital download | EMI | |
| Netherlands | November 13, 2009 | CD; LP; digital download | EMI | |
| United Kingdom | November 16, 2009 | CD; LP; digital download | EMI | |
| France | November 16, 2009 | CD; LP; digital download | EMI | |
| United States | November 17, 2009 | CD; LP; digital download | Blue Note | |
| Brazil | November 30, 2009 | CD; LP; digital download | EMI | |
