= Sunrise (Norah Jones song) =

2004 single by Norah Jones

Single by Norah Jones

from the album Feels Like Home
- B-side: "Moon Song"
- Released: January 12, 2004
- Studio: Allaire (Shokan, New York); Avatar, Sear Sound, Sorcerer Sound (New York City)
- Genre: Folk
- Length: 3:20
- Label: Blue Note
- Songwriters: Norah Jones; Lee Alexander
- Producers: Norah Jones; Arif Mardin

Norah Jones singles chronology
| "Don't Know Why" / "I'll Be Your Baby Tonight" (2003) | "Sunrise" (2004) | "What Am I to You?" (2004) |

Music video
- "Sunrise" on YouTube

"Sunrise" is the lead single of American singer-songwriter Norah Jones' second studio album, Feels like Home (2004). Released on January 12, 2004, the folk ballad reached number one in Croatia, number four in Canada, and number 13 in Italy. Despite failing to chart on the US Billboard Hot 100, the single was certified gold by the Recording Industry Association of America (RIAA) for sales of 500,000 copies. The song won Best Female Pop Vocal Performance at the 47th Annual Grammy Awards in 2005.

== Credits and personnel ==
Credits are taken from the Feels Like Home album booklet.

Studios

- Recorded at Allaire Studios (Shokan, New York), Avatar, Sear Sound, and Sorcerer Sound (New York City)
- Mixed at Sear Sound (New York City)
- Mastered at DB Plus (New York City)

Personnel

- Norah Jones – writing, vocals, piano, production
- Lee Alexander – writing, bass
- Adam Levy – backup vocals
- Kevin Breit – acoustic guitar, banjolin
- Andrew Borger – slit drum
- Arif Mardin – production
- Jay Newland – recording, mixing
- Daru Oda – backup vocals
- Gene Paul – mastering
- Jamie Polaski – mastering assistant

== Charts ==
=== Weekly charts ===
| Chart (2004) | Peak position |
|---|---|
| Austria (Ö3 Austria Top 40) | 44 |
| Belgium (Ultratip Bubbling Under Flanders) | 9 |
| Canada (Nielsen SoundScan) | 4 |
| Croatia (HRT) | 1 |
| Germany (GfK) | 53 |
| Ireland (IRMA) | 47 |
| Italy (FIMI) | 13 |
| Netherlands (Dutch Top 40 Tipparade) | 7 |
| Netherlands (Single Top 100) | 58 |
| New Zealand (Recorded Music NZ) | 29 |
| Scottish Singles Sales (Official Charts) | 31 |
| Switzerland (Schweizer Hitparade) | 84 |
| UK Singles (Official Charts) | 30 |
| US Adult Alternative Airplay (Billboard) | 1 |
| US Adult Contemporary (Billboard) | 26 |
| US Adult Pop Airplay (Billboard) | 18 |

=== Year-end charts ===
| Chart (2004) | Position |
|---|---|
| US Adult Top 40 (Billboard) | 53 |
| US Triple-A (Billboard) | 1 |

== Certifications ==
| Region | Certification | Certified units/sales |
|---|---|---|
| Denmark (IFPI Danmark) | Platinum | 90,000^{‡} |
| Germany (BVMI) | Gold | 150,000^{‡} |
| Italy (FIMI) | Platinum | 50,000^{‡} |
| New Zealand (RMNZ) | Platinum | 30,000^{‡} |
| Spain (Promusicae) | Gold | 30,000^{‡} |
| United Kingdom (BPI) | Gold | 400,000^{‡} |
| United States (RIAA) | Platinum | 1,000,000^{‡} |
^{‡} Sales+streaming figures based on certification alone.

== Release history ==
| Region | Date | Format(s) | Label(s) | Ref. |
|---|---|---|---|---|
| United States | January 12, 2004 | Triple A radio | Blue Note | |
| United States | January 19, 2004 | Smooth jazz radio | Blue Note | |
| United Kingdom | March 29, 2004 | CD | Blue Note; Parlophone | |
