= Wax Poetic =

American trip hop band

- Origin: New York City, New York, United States
- Genres: Trip hop, electronica, nu jazz, downtempo
- Years active: 1997–2012
- Labels: Nublu, Atlantic
- Spinoffs: Our Theory
- Members: İlhan Erşahin; Sissy Clemens; Gabriel Gordon; Kenny Wollesen; Tina Kristina; Zeke Zima
- Past members: Norah Jones; Saul Williams; Val Jeanty; N'Dea Davenport; Lisa Rudolph; Jesse Murphy; Jochen Rueckert; Marla Turner
- Website: www.waxpoetic.net

Wax Poetic is a New York-based trip hop band. The band came together in 1997 founded by Turkish musician Ilhan Erşahin, who is still a current member, playing tenor saxophone and keys. The group originated at the now defunct club Save the Robots, and consisted of a group of musicians jamming together. The band's music is noted for its "heavy groove of drum and bass, blended with quick dance elements." The band signed to Atlantic Records in the late '90s and released their debut self-titled album in June 2000.

Pop singer and pianist Norah Jones was a member before her break-out album Come Away with Me. Other former members include Lisa Rudolph who co-wrote four songs with Ilhan Ersahin on the first album titled three, N'Dea Davenport and Saul Williams. Jones can still be heard singing with them on two tracks of their 2003 release, Nublu Sessions.

Copenhagen was released on November 7, 2006. Part of a three part series, this CD is followed up with Istanbul and Brasil. The band's latest album, On a Ride, was released in 2012.

Besides Ilhan Erşahin, the current members include Sissy Clemens (vocals), Gabriel Gordon (vocals), Kenny Wollesen (drums), Tina Kristina (bass) and Zeke Zima (guitar).

Ilhan, Thor, and Jochen combined with Erik Truffaz and Matt Penman to create the band Our Theory.

== Discography ==
Studio albums

- Three (1998)
- Wax Poetic (2000)
- Nublu Sessions (2003)
- Copenhagen (2006)
- Istanbul (2007)
- Brasil (2007)
- On a Ride (2012)
