= Lee Alexander (musician) =

American musician

- Born: Ayer, Massachusetts
- Occupations: Bassist, songwriter, music producer
- Instruments: Bass guitar, double bass
- Member of: The Little Willies

Lee Alexander is an American bassist, songwriter, and music producer best known for his work on Norah Jones' albums Come Away with Me, Feels Like Home, and Not Too Late.

He is also a member of The Little Willies, which also includes Norah Jones.

== Biography ==
Alexander grew up in Ayer, Massachusetts. He played the viola, guitar, and bass, eventually concentrating on the latter. He initially studied art in college, but transferred to Berklee College of Music, where he majored in Professional Music.

Alexander began his professional career by touring for six months with the musical On the Town. He then lived for some time in San Francisco, where he worked as a jazz musician, before moving to New York and joining Jones' band as a bass player.

Alexander wrote or co-wrote 17 songs on Jones' first three albums, including the singles "Feelin' the Same Way", "Sunrise", "Those Sweet Words", "Sinkin' Soon", "Until the End", and "Not Too Late". He also produced Jones' third album, Not Too Late, singer/songwriter Amos Lee's self-titled debut album, and Noam Weinstein's 2006 release We're All Going There.

Alexander's musical influences include Charlie Haden, Meshell Ndegeocello, and Edgar Meyer.

Jones is reported as saying about Lee, "We inspired each other. We started writing songs at the same time. ... He's my partner musically, we live together and he's involved in all the decisions I have to make."

Alexander was romantically involved with Jones for eight years, but they eventually separated.
