= Save the Robots =

Club in New York City

Save the Robots was an underground after hours club in New York City's East Village neighborhood. "Robots", as the venue was popularly known, operated illegally from an undistinguished storefront and basement at 25 Avenue B, between East 2nd and 3rd Streets, from 1983 until mid-1984, when the club was shut down for fire safety violations. After undergoing safety-related renovations and obtaining a social club license, the venue reopened in early January 1986.

The club was frequented by drag performers, musicians, Club Kids, employees of various bars and clubs, skinheads and other denizens of downtown New York nightlife, including Dean Johnson and Lady Bunny. Save the Robots was known for its late hours of operation and sold only vodka, soda and fruit juice. Patrons typically arrived after 4 a.m. and partied until the 8 a.m. closing time, often with the aid of recreational drugs. At one point, talk show host Craig Ferguson worked there as a bouncer.

1993 was the last year of 'Robots'. The space was subsequently leased to other operators, who transformed it into a fully licensed dance club, to capitalize on the "Save the Robots" name, without consent from the original owners and with few vestiges of the initial clientele or atmosphere.

At a later time, the venue was bought by another owner and renamed Guernica. It was closed again in 2003 after the club's bouncer, Dana Blake, was stabbed in an incident with some smokers outside the club.
