= Andrew Borger =

American drummer

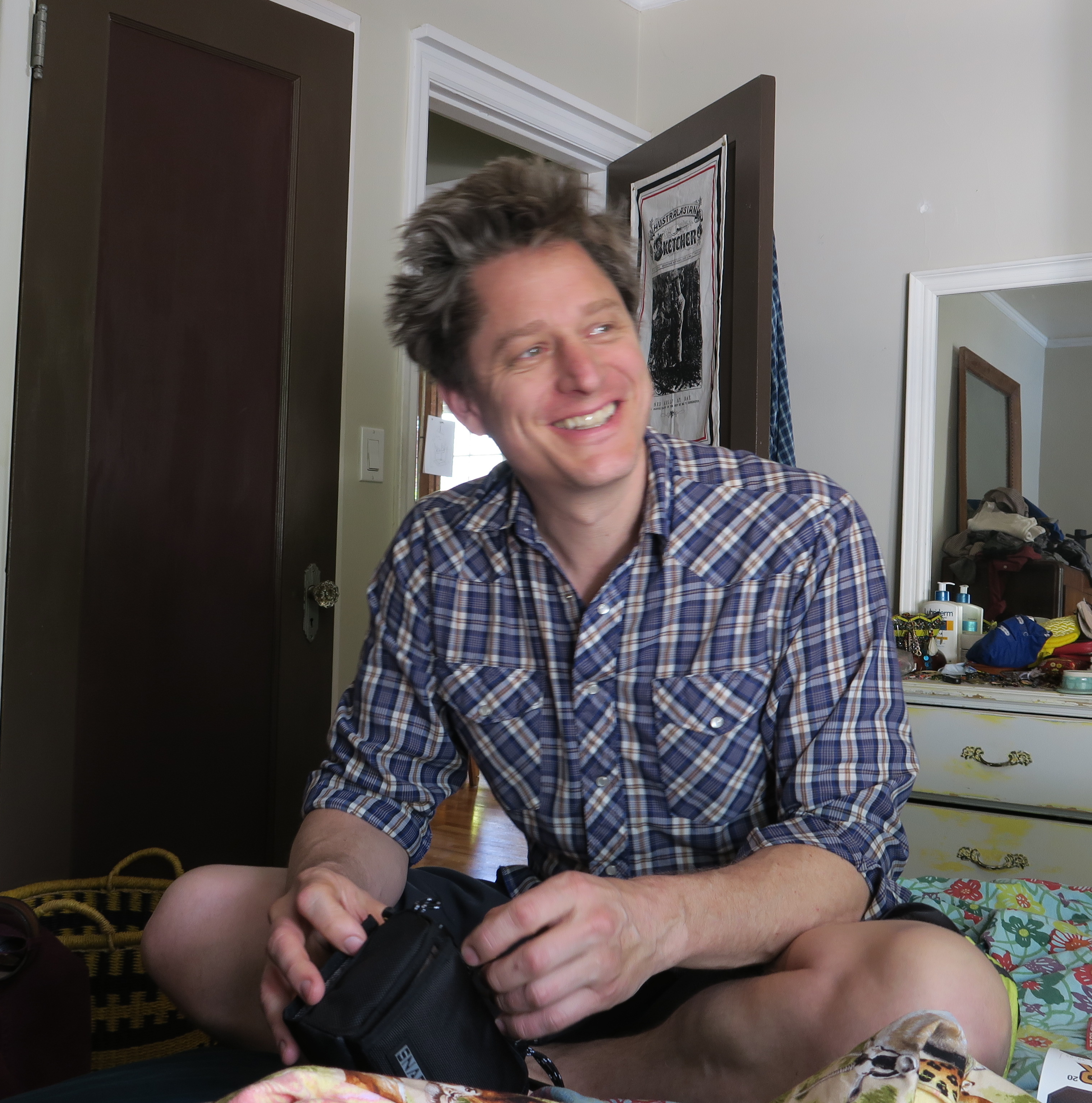

Background information
- Born: Colorado, United States
- Genres: Avant, punk, rock, experimental music, Jazz, blues, pop, soul, folk, country
- Occupations: Songwriter, musician
- Years active: 1991–present

Andrew Borger is an American drummer.

== Biography ==
Born in Littleton, Colorado, a western U.S. state, Andrew Borger went to UC Berkeley and played extensively in the San Francisco Bay Area club scene before being recognized by Tom Waits and later Norah Jones. Andrew's flair for percussion includes not only the drum kit, but hand drums, maracas, and pots & pans, He is known for his extemporaneous approach, unique sonic palette, and stylistic versatility.

In addition to Waits and Jones, he has played with Chuck Prophet, Sean Hayes, Smokey Hormel, Jesse Harris, Anaïs Mitchell, among others. Andrew (who also goes by Andy) has numerous recordings, and is featured in the DVD Norah Jones & the Handsome Band: Live in 2004. Andrew has also recorded and toured with Ani DiFranco, Marco Benevento, and k.d. lang. He currently lives in Portland, OR, and has recently performed, recorded, and toured with Meow Meow and Pink Martini.
