= The Freeborne =

American psychedelic rock band (1966–1968)

- The Freeborne in 1967

Background information
- Origin: Boston, Massachusetts, United States
- Genres: Psychedelic rock
- Years active: 1966–1968
- Label: Monitor
- Past members: Bob Margolin; Dave Codd; Nick Carstoiu; Lew Lipston; Mike Spiros

The Freeborne was an American psychedelic rock band formed in Boston, Massachusetts in 1966. The band was one of the numerous groups associated with the "Bosstown Sound", and is noted for releasing one eclectic album, Peak Impressions, in 1967, which exemplified the young members' versatility embedded in psychedelia.

== History ==
The Freeborne was organized from the remnants of two local frat rock groups, the Indigos and the Missing Links. The two groups performed covers of Top 40 radio hits, but key players sought to move on from both bands in hopes of writing original material. From the two bands, the lineup of the Freeborne, a name inspired by the film Born Free, consisted of Bob Margolin (lead guitar), Dave Codd (bass guitar, vocals) Nick Carstoiu (lead singer, rhythm guitar, keyboards), Lew Lipson (drums), and Mike Spiros (keyboards, trumpet), who was not a member of either the Indigos or the Missing Links, but was added for his versatility. In early 1967, the band began playing at music clubs and fraternities before attracting the interest of Barry Richards, a blues musician who, through his connections with the New York-based Monitor Records, had the Freeborne signed to a recording contract.

The album that resulted was titled Peak Impressions. They recorded three of their debut album's songs at ESP studios, and the rest at CBS studios, in New York City. Despite the Freeborne's age range—between ages 17 and 19—the group featured three capable multi-instrumentalists, who played a wide variety of orchestral instruments including piano, harpsichord, cello, trumpet, flute, and recorder. Coupled with the band's highly psychedelic theme is traces of blues, which Margolin picked up from watching a Remains concert prior to the Boston act's tour with the Beatles.

The album was released in mid-1967 to moderate success on the East Coast. However, Peak Impressions suffered from being associated with the "Bosstown Sound", a commercial campaign that advertised groups such as Ultimate Spinach, Beacon Street Union, and Orpheus with the intention of competing with the San Francisco Sound. It began with moderate commercial success. A factor that led to the album's commercial disappointment was the Freeborne's lack of touring, due to the fact that three members were high school students. However, the band opened up for the Velvet Underground and the Left Banke at a venue called the Boston Tea Party. They also opened up for Tim Hardin and Canned Heat at a venue called the Psychedelic Supermarket. After firing their manager, the group lost their contract with Monitor Records, and the prospect of recording two more albums. In late 1968, the Freeborne disbanded though variations of the band continued to perform well into the 1970s.

Margolin was the only member of the band to achieve considerable success after the Freeborne, performing with Muddy Waters in the 1970s. In 2014, Arf! Arf! Records reissued Peak Impressions with bonus tracks. The album is now considered one of the better psychedelic pieces to emerge from Boston during the "Bosstown Sound" movement.
