= Bosstown Sound =

Psychedelic music marketing campaign

Other bands that were part of the scene included The Cloud and Butter, managed by Bob Bronson (now, Robert Aronson) whose members included lead singer Andy Pratt and drummer Rick Schlosser, both of whom went on to considerable acclaim. Pratt's single, Avenging Annie, made Billboard's top 100 and Schlosser was an in-demand studio drummer who toured with Van Morrison and other top acts.

The advertisement that opened the Bosstown Sound marketing campaign.

The Bosstown Sound (or Boston Sound) was the catchphrase of a marketing campaign to promote psychedelic rock and psychedelic pop bands in Boston, Massachusetts, in the late 1960s. The concept was conceived by the record producer Alan Lorber as a marketing strategy intended to establish several underground musical artists native to the city on the national charts and compete with the popular San Francisco Sound. Lorber chose Boston for his plan because of the several bands developing in the city, the abundance of music venues (such as the Boston Tea Party), and the proximity of MGM Records, which had signed the core groups.

The Bosstown Sound was promoted as harnessing the hallucinogenic essence of psychedelia, also known at the time as acid rock. Numerous bands were involved, but the groups Ultimate Spinach, the Beacon Street Union, and Orpheus were the most prominent. The Boston music scene briefly captured the interest of the youth culture, and recordings by bands from Boston achieved positions on the Billboard 200 chart. However, by the end of 1969, the campaign faltered, its advertisements rejected by listeners. Critics panned the groups involved, and few of the Bosstown bands survived after the scene collapsed. Opinions are still mixed, but the music of these bands has received more positive assessments in recent years.

== History ==
=== Pre-scene ===
Prior to the Bosstown Sound, Boston had a burgeoning garage rock scene with bands such as the Remains, the Rising Storm, Teddy and the Pandas, and the Rockin' Ramrods at the forefront. The most commercially successful group in the area was the proto-punk teen band the Barbarians, who reached the Billboard Hot 100 twice with the singles "Are You a Boy or Are You a Girl" and "Moulty". The heyday of these bands pre-dated the Bosstown Sound, and they did not have much involvement in the Sound's development, with the notable exception of the album Basic Magnetism, by Teddy and the Pandas. The main problem was a lack of viable rock music venues to bring the groups together into a unified music scene. Also missing were the local and regional record labels often associated with a developing rock scene. Perhaps more evident in what grew into the Bosstown Sound was the city's equally active folk scene which was led by key figures like Bob Dylan, Joan Baez, and Mimi Farina. Their influences later emerged in the music by mainstay Bosstown bands Orpheus and Earth Opera.

What became the genesis of the Bosstown Sound is said to exist, at least in rudimentary form, as early as June 1967, when journalist Mel Lyman's first issue of Avatar was pressed. His newspaper carried an advertisement promoting a scheduled event, headlined by two of Boston's earliest psychedelic rock bands, Ill Wind and the Hallucinations, at the Boston Tea Party. Ill Wind and the Hallucinations' performances helped establish the Boston Tea Party as a must-go-to venue for the city's psychedelic scene, and soon other like-minded musical acts—among them the Velvet Underground, the Peanut Butter Conspiracy, and Lothar and the Hand People—became frequent attractions. Journalist Earl Greyland described the Boston Tea Party's importance in Boston After Dark: "[It] occurred on March 15, 1968, when, as the staid WBCN audience sat listening to its usual Muzak, the voice of Frank Zappa asked, 'Are you hung up?' and Cream launched into 'I Feel Free'. That was the beginning of the American Revolution, a daily seven-hour program originating from the dressing room of the Tea Party. The combination of providing an established performance setting and radio exposure made the Tea Party a gig second in importance only to the Fillmore". Other psychedelic venues that contributed to the promotion of the underground music scene in Boston include the Psychedelic Supermarket, the Crosstown Bus, the Catacombs, and the Unicorn.

=== "The Sound Heard Around the World" ===
Record producer Alan Lorber materialized a concept to congregate several progressive Boston bands, and promote them as a new unique music scene, in a similar fashion that led to the birth of the San Francisco Sound. In his article Bosstown Sound 1968 - The Music and Time, Lorber wrote Boston was a logical epicenter for his marketing plan "since it was a place for new and progressive music forms from the folk days, and had an exceptionally strong initial sales potential in the 250,000 college students in residence in Boston's 250 colleges and universities". Lorber also mentioned that Boston "had a large number of performance clubs where artists could develop before touring nationally. There were many pop music college and commercial radio stations which could expose the new product on a grass-roots level". Based on his past successes with the label, MGM Records agreed to showcase the bands Lorber signed. Conveniently, the company's studio was situated in New York City, making it easier for Lorber to manage and record several groups.

Another important figure in the Bosstown Sound was Dick Summer, one of Boston's most popular deejays, who worked at that time for WBZ (AM). After Summer left WBZ in 1968, he ultimately returned to Boston and was hired by WMEX Radio in May 1969, and he continued to play the Boston Sound bands. Summer was directly responsible for the initial radio boom that Bosstown musical acts would experience, and arranged concerts and outdoor festivals in the Boston area where the local bands could hone their skills in anticipation of being signed to a recording deal. It was also Summer who coined the "Bosstown Sound" phrase to create a sense of cohesion among the bands. On January 20, 1968, MGM Records commenced its advertisement campaign for the Bosstown Sound by funding for a patriotic-style ad in Billboard magazine that read: "The Sound Heard Around the World; Boston!!". On the same date, three Boston-based groups known well to the underground scene -- Ultimate Spinach (better known as Underground Cinema prior to the album), Beacon Street Union, and Orpheus had their debut albums released on the MGM label.

The anticipation of the Bosstown Sound's debut to the record-buying public generated a booming market for Boston-based bands. Beacon Street Union's The Eyes of the Beacon Street Union charted at number 75 on the Billboard 200, and Orpheus's self-titled debut reached number 119. Although Orpheus is pegged as a part of the Bosstown Sound, music historian Richie Unterberger notes they were "sentimental pop writers at heart" reminiscent of the Association, rather than the psychedelic bands that comprised much of the Sound. Later benefiting from their more commercially accessible sound, Orpheus was among the few Bosstown bands to have a single ("Can't Find The Time" in 1968 and 1969, since covered by the Rose Colored Glass and by Hootie and the Blowfish, and the minor 1969 hit "Brown Arms in Houston") chart on the Billboard Hot 100. Emerging from the original three MGM-signed groups, Ultimate Spinach—masterminded by singer-songwriter and multi-instrumentalist Ian Bruce-Douglas—achieved the most commercial success from their debut effort, which peaked at number 35 and sold approximately 110,000 copies in 1968. Despite sharp criticism from music critics upon release, over time, the album, now regarded as an acid rock classic, has become a cult favorite among psychedelic aficionados and is the highlight of the Bosstown Sound.

Following in the trend set by the first three Bosstown groups on their label, MGM Records released other material by local groups such as Chamaeleon Church and Kangeroo. Attempting to cash-in on the sudden craze, other major labels like Elektra Records and ABC Records signed their own assortment of bands native to the city. Among them was Eden's Children, which released a Jimi Hendrix-inspired album in 1968 that charted in the Billboard 200 at 196. Apple Pie Motherhood Band deviated from the psychedelic sound, recording two LPs that incorporated an assortment of bluesy originals and covers. Young teen group, the Freeborne recorded the album Peak Impressions, an ambitious, but somewhat unpredictable, piece that experimented with a variety of instruments. Another group known as Listening recorded a self-titled album in late-1968, which encompassed performances by former Velvet Underground bassist Walter Powers and guitarist Peter Malick. Several additional groups were also associated with the scene such as Earth Opera, the Tangerine Zoo, the Art of Lovin', and Ill Wind.

=== Decline and reception ===
Almost immediately following the success of the Bosstown Sound campaign, music critics began to comment on the apparent lack of originality of some of the bands. Another issue discussed was the diversity among Boston's musical artists, which brought to question whether there was an actual effort to create a unified scene or a manufactured attempt to cash in on the popularity of psychedelia. Music journalist Paul Williams, writing for Crawdaddy!, homed in on the concern: "[T]here isn't any common consciousness in the Boston rock scene -- there isn't even any Boston rock scene. There are good groups coming out of that area but there isn't the spiritual unity that San Francisco had". A Jazz & Pop article remarked that "the sound doesn't exist except in the head of Alan Lorber". The newly established Rolling Stone magazine questioned "whether or not there is anything lying beneath the hype", describing the Boston groups as pretentious and boring. A few articles, such as one in Newsweek, attempted to defend the scene, saying a sense of unity was found in "subdued, artful electronic sound, an insistence on clear, understandable lyrics, the spice of dissonance and the infusion of classical textures".

By early 1969, nearly all the Bosstown groups had either disbanded or disappeared from the public view as a consequence of media and youth culture backlash. Ultimate Spinach barely managed to chart at number 198 with their album Behold & See, which noticeably lacked the organ-driven instrumentals that were featured on their debut. Following Bruce-Douglas's departure from the band, Ultimate Spinach released one third and final album called Ultimate Spinach III', but directionless, in 1969 with an almost completely reconstructed lineup. The Beacon Street Union's The Clown Died in Marvin Gardens was plagued by the Sound's negative stigma, and only reached number 175. Orpheus was among the few groups to remain active into the 1970s, and has since conducted reunions in the 1980s and, again, in the 2000s.

In the aftermath of the Bosstown Sound, reviews remain mixed, but critics have begun to describe the scene in a better light. In 1988, Rolling Stone magazine, while reevaluating the Sound, conceded it was perhaps "easier to put down Ultimate Spinach and the other Boston groups than it had been to like them". Music critic Steve Nelson notes that after "the hype died down, Boston in fact turned out to be a great incubator of musical talent, producing acts like J. Geils, Aerosmith, and The Cars". While interviewing Bruce-Douglas in 2001, critic Gary Burns stated Ultimate Spinach, which received the brunt of the media stigma focusing on Bosstown, "deserved a much better fate. The Bosstown hype was not their idea, and their records are some of the best psychedelic music available then or now. Their brief time in the spotlight brought them not well-earned glory but unexpected trauma, which fractured an already-fragile band". Others, like Richie Unterberger, dismissed the bands' work as "poor third cousins to the West Coast psychedelic groups that served as their obvious inspirations".

In 1996, Big Beat Records released the compilation album Bosstown Sound, 1968: The Music & the Time, which included an assortment of Bosstown and pre-scene bands. In 2001, Best of the Bosstown Sound followed with a more condensed track listing.

== Associated acts ==
- Apple Pie Motherhood Band
- The Art of Lovin'
- The Bagatelle
- Beacon Street Union
- Bead Game
- Bo Grumpus
- The Cambridge Electric Opera Company
- Chamaeleon Church
- Earth Opera
- Eden's Children
- Flat Earth Society
- Ford Theatre
- Fort Mudge Memorial Dump
- The Freeborne
- Front Page Review
- Ill Wind
- Kangaroo
- Listening
- Orpheus
- Puff
- Phluph
- The Tangerine Zoo
- Teddy and the Pandas
- Ultimate Spinach
