= The Lost (band) =

American garage rock/psychedelic band (1964–1967)

- Origin: Plainfield, Vermont, U.S.
- Genres: Garage rock; folk rock; psychedelic
- Years active: 1964-1967
- Label: Capitol
- Past members: Ted Myers; Hugh Magbie; Walter Powers III; Willie Alexander; Tony Pfeiffer; Kyle Garrahan; Lee Mason

The Lost was an American garage rock and psychedelic band from Plainfield, Vermont who were active in the Boston rock scene of the 1960s. They were initially an interracial rock band, one of the few at the time, and, along with the Remains and the Rockin' Ramrods, later became one of the most popular live acts in Boston, landing a contract with Capitol Records. In spite of having a regional hit with their first record, they were unable to find greater commercial success and broke up in 1967. In the intervening years their work has come to the attention of garage rock collectors and enthusiasts with the release of the anthology, Early Recordings and Lost Tapes, on Arf! Arf! Records.

== History ==
The Lost were formed at Goddard College in Plainfield, Vermont in 1964. Initially they were an interracial band featuring black guitarist and singer Hugh Magbie. Their original lineup consisted Magbie on lead guitar and vocals, Ted Myers on rhythm guitar and vocals, Walter Powers III on bass, harmonica, and vocals, Willie "Loco" Alexander on keyboards, percussion and vocals, and Tony Pfeiffer on drums. After the move to Boston in late 1964, Magbie and Pfeiffer departed, both choosing to return to college. Lee Mason, a childhood friend of Myers, replaced Pfeiffer on drums and the band brought in Kyle Garrahan on lead guitar. The Lost built a repertoire containing a fairly large set of original songs written by guitarist Ted Myers and keyboardist Willie Alexander. The Lost became one of the most popular live bands in Boston, playing at the Rathskeller.

On December 12, 1964, they recorded a demo at Bard College in Boston produced by Barry Tashian of the Remains, which helped them land a contract with Capitol Records. Their debut single for Capitol, "Maybe More Than You" b/w "Back Door Blues" reflected the influences of Bob Dylan and folk rock and received a degree of airplay on radio stations in Massachusetts and New York. The band played as an opening act for James Brown, Sonny & Cher, the Supremes, the Shirelles, and Jr. Walker & The All Stars, in addition to touring the East Coast with the Beach Boys in the spring of 1966.

Their next single, "Violet Gown" did not come out until a year later. Its first release b/w "Mean Motorcycle" was rescinded by Capitol and had to be re-recorded in a second version produced by Jerry Keller, with a new B-side of "No Reason Why." The single failed to chart. Disappointed with its lack of success, Capitol ended their relationship with the band. The band's momentum began to stop. In January 1967 the Lost would play four shows, including one for the opening weekend of a newly christened venue, the Boston Tea Party, in a building which had previously served a cinemateque for avant garde film, and would now become a well-known fixture in Boston's burgeoning Bosstown psychedelic rock scene. The Lost played their last show at the Tea Party on January 28, 1967. Shortly thereafter, the band broke up.

Ted Myers went on to play in the psychedelic rock band, Chamaeleon Church, along with future comedy star, Chevy Chase who was their drummer. Myers would also play in Ultimate Spinach during their final days. In the early 1970s bassist Walter Powers and keyboardist Willie Alexander joined the final lineup of the Velvet Underground after Lou Reed had departed. Alexander went on to play with local bands over the following decades in the Boston area, earning an almost legendary reputation there as an in-demand musician. The Lost have re-united for occasional performances.

In addition to their three singles in the mid-1960s, the Lost recorded numerous unissued songs, much of which were released in the 1990s on the Early Recordings and Lost Tapes CD, up out by Arf! Arf! Records.

== Membership ==
=== 1964 ===
- Hugh Magbie (lead and backup vocals)
- Ted Myers (guitar and vocals)
- Walter Powers III (bass, harmonica, and vocals)
- Willie Alexander (keyboards, percussion and vocals)
- Tony Pfeiffer (drums)

=== 1965-1967 ===
- Ted Myers (guitar and vocals)
- Kyle Garrahan (lead guitar)
- Walter Powers III (bass, harmonica, and vocals)
- Willie Alexander (keyboards, percussion and vocals)
- Lee Mason (drums)

== Discography ==
- "Maybe More than You" b/w "Back Door Blues" (Capitol 5519, October 1965)
- "Violent Gown" b/w "Mean Motorcycle" (Capitol 5708, July 1966)
- "Violent Gown" b/w "No Reason Why" b/w (Capitol 5725, August 1966)
