= The Tangerine Zoo =

American psychedelic rock band

Background information
- Origin: Swansea, Massachusetts, United States
- Genres: Psychedelic rock
- Years active: 1966 - 1970
- Label: Mainstream
- Past members: Robert "Benny" Benevides; Tony Taveira; Donald Smith; Ron Medeiros; Wayne Gagnon

The Tangerine Zoo was an American psychedelic rock band formed in Swansea, Massachusetts, in 1966. Encompassed in Boston's psychedelic scene and considered a part of the Bosstown Sound, the band became popular regionally, and released two albums on Mainstream Records during their recording career. The Tangerine Zoo had an opportunity to achieve national recognition at the Woodstock Festival, but was forced to decline the invitation. Nonetheless, the group's material has been reinstated into the public conscious after 1960s psychedelic music collectors have discovered the Tangerine Zoo's work years after their disbandment.

== History ==
Future Tangerine Zoo members Robert "Benny" Benevides (lead guitar), Tony Taveira (bass guitar), and Donald Smith (drums) first collaborated in the garage rock band, the Ebb Tides, which were formed in 1966. The band became popular regionally, performing as headliners at a series of festivals and battles of the bands. In mid-1966, the Ebb Tides recorded their single "My Baby's Gone" backed by a cover version of "Summertime" for Arco Records. The A-side was later featured on the compilation album Sixties Rebellion, Volume 4, in 1993 and on Quagmire, Volume 3, in 2004. However, disagreements with bandmates Charlie Robidoux and Bobby Robidoux caused the premature disbandment of the Ebb Tides. Abandoning the group's garage sound in favor of psychedelic rock, a new band called the Flower Pot was established soon after.

The band recruited Ron Medeiros (keyboards, harmonica) and Wayne Gagnon, the latter of whom Taveira was bandmates with in the group the Rockin' Teens. With the burgeoning psychedelic rock scene and hippie movement emerging in Boston, the group's new sound featuring a Hammond organ and fuzz-toned instrumentals put them on the edge of mainstream popularity. Taveira recalled later on "The band auditioned for Mercury, RCA Victor and Mainstream in the fall of 1967 in New York City", noting Mercury Records and RCA Victor Records offered the Flower Pot a recording contract to release a single and possibly an album. However, as he also explained, Mainstream Records "offered both at the same time. How could we pass that up after working so hard to get there? Mainstream had us in the studio within a month". As mandated in their contract, the band's name—a reference to marijuana—was changed to the Tangerine Zoo.

In February 1968, the band released their self-titled debut album. With seven of the nine tracks originally composed by group members, the album's best-known song is actually a six-minute rendition of Them's tune "Gloria". One review states "with swirly Hammond and feedback-drenched psychedelic noodling a-plenty doesn't seem like a good way to avoid the mainstream and do your own thing, but the band manage to stamp their own style on this classic". Ironically, the Tangerine Zoo's recording of "One Is the Loneliest Number" was not released, and became a national hit on the Billboard Hot 100 for Three Dog Night in April 1969. One track, "Nature's Children", was covered by garage band the Kidds with regional success, and appears on Pebbles, Volume 10. To promote the group's album, the Tangerine Zoo performed at Boston's popular psychedelic music clubs including the Boston Tea Party and the Psychedelic Supermarket, with the Jimi Hendrix Experience, Cream, and the Amboy Dukes.

All the while, the Tangerine Zoo was advertised as a proponent to the Bosstown Sound, a commercial strategy focusing on several Boston-area psychedelic rock bands such as Ultimate Spinach and the Beacon Street Union. Prior to recording the group's second album, Outside Looking In, Taveira departed to finish high school. In 1969, the Tangerine Zoo was invited to perform at the Woodstock Festival; however, as a consequence of other commitments, were forced to decline the offer. The Tangerine Zoo dissolved in 1970 after music differences plagued the group. Gagnon soon resurfaced with the band Wadsworth Mansion, earning a Top 10 hit with "Sweet Mary", in 1971. Since their disbandment, the band has had three reunions: first in 1988 then again in 1990 and 1993.

== Discography ==
=== Singles ===
- "One More Heartache" b/w "Trip to the Zoo" - Mainstream Records (682), 1968
- "Like People (Part 1)" b/w "Like People (Part 2)" - Mainstream Records (690), 1968

=== Albums ===
- Tangerine Zoo - Mainstream Records (56107), 1968
- Outside Looking In - Mainstream Records (S-6116), 1968
