= Ultimate Spinach (album) =

Studio album by Ultimate Spinach
- Released: January 6, 1968
- Recorded: September 18 – October 29, 1967
- Studio: Bell Sound (New York City)
- Genres: Psychedelic rock; acid rock
- Length: 36:14
- Label: MGM
- Producer: Alan Lorber

Ultimate Spinach chronology
Ultimate Spinach (1968)	Behold & See (1968)

Singles from Ultimate Spinach
- 1. "Ego Trip / Your Head Is Reeling" Released: 1968

Professional ratings
Review scores
Source	Rating
AllMusic	3/5 stars

Ultimate Spinach is the 1968 self-titled debut studio album by the American psychedelic rock band Ultimate Spinach, and was released on the MGM Records label (E/SE-4518) simultaneously with the debut LP of two other Boston-area bands, Beacon Street Union and Orpheus. Both albums were heavily promoted by the label as being representative of the "Bosstown Sound". The commercial ploy was heavily driven in psychedelic music that attempted to replicate the San Francisco Sound.

== Background ==
Ian Bruce-Douglas composed all the songs, played several instruments, and sang lead for most of the tracks.

Apart from its obvious references about the use of psychedelic drugs, Ultimate Spinach is a concept album based on abstract anti-war sentiment, in the context of the Vietnam War that happened at that time. Lyrically, Bruce-Douglas' songs are subtle, pretty intricate and with an imaginary vision of life.

One of the most notable characteristics is its experimental style, with "sonic artifacts" and unusual recording techniques, among which stand out a variety of guitar sounds and distortions including fuzz, echo, tremolo, feedback, volume control, and use of the wah-wah pedal. Each of those aspects were similar to the typical West Coast psychedelic sound of the era.

With the publicity backing them, the band toured with prominent musical acts like Big Brother and the Holding Company and The Youngbloods at significant venues like the Filmore Auditorium.

Following their recording and initial tour, drummer Keith Lahtenein left the group to by replaced Russell Levine. Priscilla DiDonato was also added to the lineup at this time. The addition enabled the band to more closely recreate the overdubbed vocal harmonies in their debut album.

== Reception ==
The album was Ultimate Spinach's most successful when it peaked at number 34 on the Billboard 200.

In 2008, the album still retained its presence as a psychedelic classic when it was listed at number 36 on Classic Rock magazine's "42 Greatest Psychedelic Albums".

== Track listing ==
All songs written by Ian Bruce-Douglas.

LP Side A

1. "Ego Trip" – 3:13
2. "Sacrifice of the Moon (in four parts)" – 3:45
3. "Plastic Raincoats/Hung Up Minds" – 2:56
4. "Ballad of the Hip Death Goddess" – 8:14

LP Side B

1. "Your Head Is Reeling" – 3:36
2. "Dove in Hawk's Clothing" – 3:54
3. "Baroque #1" – 4:48
4. "Funny Freak Parade" – 2:35
5. "Pamela" – 3:08

== Personnel ==
- Ian Bruce-Douglas - vocals, guitar (acoustic and electric), 12-string bass, electric piano, organ, keyboards, sitar, vibraphone, theremin, recording
- Barbara Jean Hudson - guitar (acoustic and electric), vocals
- Keith Lahteinen - drums, percussion, vocals
- Richard Nese - bass (acoustic and electric), feedback
- Geoffrey Winthrop - guitar (acoustic and electric), feedback, sitar (acoustic and electric), vocals
- Ted Myers - guitar, vocals
