= Chamaeleon Church =

American psychedelic rock band (1967–1968)

- Origin: Boston, Massachusetts, United States
- Genres: Psychedelic rock; psychedelic pop
- Years active: 1967–1968
- Label: MGM
- Past members: Ted Myers; Tony Scheuren; Kyle Garrahan; Chevy Chase

Chamaeleon Church was a short-lived American psychedelic rock band formed in Boston, Massachusetts, in 1967. It was founded by singer-songwriter Ted Myers after the disbandment of the Lost. Chamaeleon Church recorded one self-titled album in 1968. Similar to other psychedelic groups native to Boston, the band is remembered for its relation to the Bosstown Sound. In addition, the band had future actor and comedian Chevy Chase as a member.

== History ==
Ted Myers (rhythm guitar, vocals), following the disbandment of garage rock band the Lost in early 1967, ventured to New York City. Anxious to have the opportunity to release a full-length album (The Lost only recorded three singles in its existence, although they did record an album's-worth of material), Myers signed a recording contract with record producer Alan Lorber, who was working with MGM Records. Myers proceeded to recruit Tony Scheuren (guitars, bass guitar, vocals), former member of the Lost Kyle Garrahan (guitars, bass guitar, piano, vocals), and Chevy Chase (drums, keyboards, vocals). The band, named Chamaeleon Church in reference to Scheuren's song "Camilla Is Changing", toured briefly in New York City before commuting to various studios, rehearsing for their debut album.

The self-titled album was recorded over the span of two weeks at Mayfair Studios, the only studio in New York City at the time equipped with professional eight-track recording equipment. Speaking on the recording process, Myers recalled "Most of the songs I wrote back then were informed by the spiritual and philosophical revelations I experienced on psychedelics". However, the sessions were conflicted with disagreements between the group and Lorber over musical direction. As a consequence, band members later renounced the majority of the songs on Chamaeleon Church, claiming Lorber's soft rock influences compromised the end result. Prior to the album, "Camilla Is Changing" was released in 1968 as the lone single. While the song was unique with its high-pitched vocal harmonies and backwards echoing effects, it went largely unnoticed at the time of its original release.

Following the distribution of the album, Chamaeleon Church toured in Boston and appeared on the ABC television special Preview hosted by actor Adam West. The band dissolved soon after; however, Myers and Scheuren reunited as members of Ultimate Spinach, recording the group's third and final album, Ultimate Spinach III, in 1969. Myers went on to work for Rhino Records while Scheuren became a staff member for National Lampoon magazine and worked extensively on the National Lampoon Radio Hour and several road shows, including the road company of Lemmings along with Chase, John Belushi, and Zal Yanovsky (Lovin' Spoonful). Scheuren was also on two Grammy-nominated Lampoon records with Chase, The Missing White House Tapes and Goodbye Pop, which featured his Neil Young parody, "Southern California Brings Me Down".

As for Chase, he became a successful comedian, earning a role as one of the original cast members of Saturday Night Live. In 2000, Akarma Records reissued Chamaeleon Church with two bonus tracks. The group's material has also appeared on compilation albums, most notably Family Circle and Bosstown Sound 1968: The Music & the Time.

== Members ==
- Ted Myers – vocals, rhythm guitar
- Tony Scheuren – vocals, lead and rhythm guitars, bass guitar, harpsichord
- Kyle Garrahan – vocals, bass guitar, lead guitar, piano
- Chevy Chase – vocals, drums, percussion, piano, electric organ, Rocksichord

== Discography ==
Albums

- Chamaeleon Church (1968)

Singles

- "Camilla Is Changing" b/w "Your Golden Love" (1968)
