= Behold & See =

Studio album by Ultimate Spinach
- Released: August 1968
- Recorded: April 13–24, 1968; Mayfair Studios, NYC
- Genre: Psychedelic rock; acid rock
- Length: 50:55
- Label: MGM
- Producer: Alan Lorber

Ultimate Spinach chronology
Ultimate Spinach (1968)	Behold & See (1968)	Ultimate Spinach III (1969)

Behold & See is the second studio album by the American psychedelic rock band Ultimate Spinach, and was released on MGM Records in August 1968 (see 1968 in music).

== Background ==
The album came at the tail-end of the group's commercial success with their Top 40 debut, Ultimate Spinach, a direct product of the marketing campaign known as the Bosstown Sound. However, the Sound's advertising had begun to have an adverse effect on the Boston bands that spearheaded the movement, leading to Ultimate Spinach's popularity to go on the decline by the time the group initiated recording sessions.

Lead vocalist, multi-instrumentalist, and songwriter Ian Bruce-Douglas, again, fronted Ultimate Spinach throughout the recording process. For the album, female vocalist Barbara Jean Hudson was reserved to backing vocals while guest singer Carol Lee Brit is featured on "Where You're At".

However, sessions were plagued by acrimony and hostility between Bruce-Douglas and his bandmates over both the pressures of repeating the success from their first album, and the group's disappointing performance at the Fillmore West.

As a consequence, much of the band's playing is more subdued and dispassionate, and, overall, lacks the striking keyboard solos found on Ultimate Spinach. Still, as described by music critic Gary Burns, Behold & See is, like its predecessor, a concept album "unified by the darkly utopian vision and domineering personality of Bruce-Douglas".

== Reception ==
Reception on the album is generally mixed, with Richie Unterberger, writing for AllMusic, being critical on Bruce-Douglas's lyrics, saying they "are unintentional hippie parodies without any irony or humor, whether solemnly aspiring to a beatnik state or indicting the straight world".

Peter Lovell, while reflecting on Ultimate Spinach's role in the Bosstown Sound, writes that despite the album's shortcomings "fans will find plenty to like and Douglas comes off well. He's got the songs and the trippy lyrics and his playing is equal to the first album. His ideas are strewn though the LP".

In a positive review, Gary Burns contemplates that Behold & See deserved better reception from critics at the time of its release, and was disappointed by the alterations made on the album's reissue.

== Releases ==
The album was released in August 1968, and stalled at number 198 on the Billboard 200. Shortly after Behold & See was distributed, Bruce-Douglas departed Ultimate Spinach, and essentially disbanded the group, although an almost entirely new lineup would release one final album in 1969.

In 1995, Big Beat Records reissued Behold & See remastered on compact disc. The effort was spearheaded by the album's original record producer Alan Lorber, and designated as the "director's cut". It is 10 minutes shorter than the LP version, with the song "Visions of Your Reality" removed, the track listing altered, and "Fragmentary March of Green", "Jazz Thing", and "Mind Flowers" also being edited.

== Track listing ==
All the songs written by Ian Bruce-Douglas.

LP Side A

1. "Gilded Lamp of the Cosmos" – 2:30
2. "Visions of Your Reality" – 5:49
3. "Jazz Thing" – 8:20 (The actual timing is 9:31)
4. "Mind Flowers" – 9:38

LP Side B

1. "Where You're At" – 3:10
2. "Suite: Genesis of Beauty (In Four Parts)" – 9:56
3. "Fifth Horseman of the Apocalypse" – 5:50
4. "Fragmentary March of Green" – 6:51

== Personnel ==
- Ian Bruce-Douglas – lead vocals, electric piano, organ, vibraphone, lead guitar, recorder
- Russell Levine – drums, percussion
- Richard Nese – bass guitar
- Geoffrey Winthrop – rhythm guitar
- Barbara Jean Hudson – vocals, acoustic guitar
- Carol Lee Brit – vocals (guest musician)
