= John Lincoln Wright =

American Country-Rock musician

- Born: 1947; Boston, Massachusetts, U.S.
- Origin: Maine, U.S.
- Died: December 4, 2011 (aged 63–64) Cambridge, Massachusetts, U.S.
- Education: Boston College
- Genres: Country rock
- Occupation: Singer-songwriter
- Years active: 1960s–1990s

John Lincoln Wright was an American country-rock musician and member of the Sour Mash Boys.

== Early life and education ==
Wright was born in Boston, Massachusetts and grew up in Maine.

== Career ==
Wright began his career as a rock musician in the 1960s. While attending Boston College, Wright joined a band that had just lost its lead singer. The group renamed itself the Beacon Street Union and played its first gig in 1966. The group was signed by MGM Records and its album The Eyes of the Beacon Street Union reaching No. 75 on Billboard.

After a few years of playing with Beacon Street Union, Wright returned home to Maine and began writing country songs. He returned to Main in 1972 and began performing. Wright was an original member of the Sour Mash Boys, a group that included him on vocals, John McDonald on guitar, Ed Hughes on drums, Ray Jacques on bass, and Bill Henderson on electric violin. He remained a member of the group through over 100 personnel changes through the decades it performed.

After the Hillbilly Ranch caught fire in 1980, Wright memorialized it with the song "They Tore Down the Hillbilly Ranch." Wright also wrote the song "The Ballad of Oil Can Boyd," a song referencing the baseball player Oil Can Boyd.

== Awards ==
- 1989 - Boston Music Awards - Outstanding Country Act (John Lincoln Write & The Sour Mash Boys)
- 1992 – Boston Music Awards – Outstanding Country Act (John Lincoln Write & The Sour Mash Boys)
