= Can't Find the Time =

1967 single by Orpheus

Single by Orpheus

from the album Orpheus
- B-side: "Lesley's World"
- Released: December 1967 (U.S.); August 1969
- Genre: Pop, Soft rock
- Label: MGM
- Songwriter: Bruce Arnold
- Producer: Alan Lorber

Orpheus singles chronology
| "Can't Find the Time" (1967) | "Brown Arms in Houston" (1969) |

Music video
- Listen to "Can't Find the Time" (1969 TV performance) on YouTube

"Can't Find the Time"

Single by Rose Colored Glass
- B-side: "Mystic Touch"
- Released: April 1971
- Genre: Pop, Soft rock
- Length: 2:45
- Label: Bang
- Songwriter: Bruce Arnold
- Producers: Jim Long, Norm Miller

Rose Colored Glass singles chronology
| "Can't Find the Time" (1971) | "If It's Alright With You" (1971) |

"Can't Find the Time" is a song originally recorded by Orpheus in October 1967, and released December 1967. It was the first release from their eponymous debut LP. The writer and lead singer is Bruce Arnold. Session drummer Bernard Purdie, who would later befriend Arnold and collaborate further, is among the musicians on the recording.

Originally released in early 1968, the song charted very minorly in the U.S., but reaching #15 on WMCA in New York City. The single was re-released in late 1969, with somewhat better success. It reached #80 on the U.S. Billboard Hot 100 and #72 Cash Box. It was more popular in Canada, where it reached #63.

== Rose Colored Glass cover ==
Dallas pop rock quartet Rose Colored Glass covered "Can't Find the Time" in 1971. It was a non-album single. Their version charted only in the U.S., but considerably higher than the prior releases, reaching #54. The song also reached #30 on the U.S. Easy Listening chart.

== Chart history ==
Orpheus original

| Chart (1968) | Peak position |
|---|---|
| U.S. Billboard Hot 100 | 111 |
| U.S. Cash Box Top 100 | 88 |

| Chart (1969) | Peak position |
|---|---|
| Canada RPM Top Singles | 63 |
| U.S. Billboard Hot 100 | 80 |
| U.S. Cash Box Top 100 | 72 |

Rose Colored Glass cover

| Chart (1971) | Peak position |
|---|---|
| U.S. Billboard Hot 100 | 54 |
| U.S. Easy Listening (Billboard) | 30 |
| U.S. Cash Box Top 100 | 53 |
