= The Remains (album) =

1966 studio album by the Remains

Studio album by the Remains
- Released: September 1966
- Recorded: January 28, 1965 – August 9, 1966
- Genre: Garage rock
- Length: 25:46
- Label: Epic
- Producers: Ted Cooper, Billy Sherrill

The Remains chronology
| The Remains (1966) | Live in Boston (1984) |

Singles from The Remains
- 1. "Diddy Wah Diddy" / "Once Before" Released: March 1966; 2. "Don't Look Back" Released: August 1966

The Remains is the debut album by the American garage rock band the Remains, released on Epic Records in September 1966. Though the album was largely overlooked at the time of its original release, The Remains has since received recognition as one of the more cohesive efforts of the era.

== Background ==
The Remains formed in 1964, quickly establishing themselves as a popular attraction across New England and performing in sold-out venues to a loyal fanbase. By 1965, the group's popularity reached an apex, with the Remains earning four regional hits on Epic Records, and appearing on The Ed Sullivan Show. Prior to recording their debut album the band's manager John Kurland arranged an audition with Capitol Records on May 26, 1966. According to guitarist Barry Tashian, the group was interested in switching record labels because, "At Epic, our unhappiness stemmed from the fact that, promotion-wise, we felt like we were the poor cousins to Bobby Vinton, Ed Ames, and the Yardbirds, Epic's biggest selling artists at the time." Though the session did not result in a recording contract, the recordings, which except for "Why Do I Cry?" were cover versions, later manifested themselves on a Sundazed Music release, A Session with the Remains.

Recording sessions commenced in mid-1966 as the Remains prepared for their tour alongside the Beatles. The recording time in the studio saw the group explore different musical textures, including a guitar raveup on the opening track "Heart", Jagger-like sneer in "Lonely Weekend", and the band's early R&B influenced regional hits "Why Do I Cry?" and "Diddy Wah Diddy". Tashian states the reason the Remains covered a fair number of songs was to look "for a big national hit, and since we didn't seem to be connecting with the original songs we decided to put out some covers and see if maybe that would do the trick." Arguably, the band's most accomplished piece on The Remains is "Don't Look Back", the tune's regional popularity apparent by The Rising Storm's own rendition of the song in 1968. The hard-edged rocker later resurfaced on Nuggets: Original Artyfacts from the First Psychedelic Era, 1965–1968.

The Remains was released on Epic Records in September 1966; however, the group had disbanded just before its distribution. As a result, the record label did not promote the album and it was largely forgotten, even among the Remains' following. Since its initial release, the album has been reissued, first with record producer Bruce Patch's distribution of The Remains on his independent record label Spoonfed Records in 1978. The album received a more commercial release in 1991 on Epic Records, with bonus tracks from the group's non-album singles. It was also distributed on Sundazed Music in 2009.

Music critic Richie Unterberger, writing for the AllMusic website, said that the Remains' effort "had a lot of professional finesse to their straight-ahead attack and sharp songwriting, sometimes sounding like a fusion of the Beatles and the Zombies with their energetic harmonies and guitar-electric keyboard blend." Critic Mark Kemp gives a glowing review in Paste magazine saying, "Had these Boston bad boys stuck it out beyond their 1966 debut, we might today be calling them—and not the Stones—the World's Greatest Rock 'n' Roll Band. As it is, The Remains most certainly are America's greatest lost band". Peter Wolf of the J. Geils Band commented that "The Remains were the band that led the way for Rock n' Rollers in Boston."

== Track listing ==
=== Original release ===
Side one

1. "Heart" (Georges Aber, Tony Hatch) – 2:36
2. "Lonely Weekend" (Charlie Rich) – 3:20
3. "Don't Look Back" (Billy Vera) – 2:35
4. "Why Do I Cry?" (Barry Tashian) – 2:45
5. "Diddy Wah Diddy" (Ellas McDaniel, Willy Dixon) – 2:32

Side two

1. "You Got a Hard Time Coming" (Tashian, Vern Miller) – 2:04
2. "Once Before" (Miller, Chip Damiani) – 2:07
3. "Thank You" (Tashian) – 3:14
4. "Time of Day" (Tashian) – 2:16
5. "Say You're Sorry" (Bill Briggs) – 2:17

=== 2007 reissue ===
Sides ones and two were combined as tracks 1–10 and followed by bonus tracks:

11. "Mercy, Mercy" (Don Covay) – 2:38
12. "I Can't Get Away from You" (Miller) – 2:36
13. "But I Ain't Got You" (Miller) – 2:11
14. "Me Right Now" (Tashian) – 2:28
15. "My Babe" (Dixon) – 2:10
16. "I'm Talking About You" (Chuck Berry) – 2:13
17. "Ain't That Her" (Tashian) – 2:11
18. "Baby, I Believe in You" (Tashian) – 2:35
19. "When I Want to Know" (Tashian) – 2:11
20. "All Good Things" (Miller) – 2:14

== Personnel ==
According to Mark Deming of AllMusic and Tashian and Jeff Jarema's liner notes to the 2007 CD reissue:

The Remains

- Barry Tashian – vocals, guitar
- Vern Miller – bass
- Bill Briggs – keyboards
- Chip Damiani – drums

Production

- Ted Cooper – producer ("Heart", "Lonely Weekend", "Don't Look Back", "Thank You", "Say You're Sorry")
- Robin McBridge – producer ("Why Do I Cry", uncredited)
- Bob Morgan – producer ("Lonely Weekend", uncredited)
- Billy Sherrill – producer ("Diddy Wah Diddy", "You Got a Hard Time Coming", "Once Before", "Time of Day")
