= Don't Look Back (The Remains song) =

- US single label

Single by the Remains

from the album The Remains
- B-side: "Me Right Now"
- Released: August 1966
- Recorded: July 25, 1966
- Studio: New York City
- Genre: Garage rock
- Length: 2:38
- Label: Epic
- Songwriter: Billy Vera
- Producer: Ted Cooper

The Remains singles chronology
"Diddy Wah Diddy" (1966)	"Don't Look Back" (1966)

"Don't Look Back" was the Remains' last single on Epic Records. The song was composed by Billy Vera, who composed and recorded "Storybook Children" for Atlantic Records. "Don't Look Back" was released as Epic 10060 in 1966. Its B-side was "Me Right Now", composed by Barry Tashian, the Remains' leader.

"Don't Look Back" was featured on the Remains' one album, The Remains, which was released by Epic in 1966. "Don't Look Back" was also included on the popular Nuggets: Original Artyfacts from the First Psychedelic Era, 1965–1968.

Robert Plant covered this song as one of the extra tracks released on the "Hurting Kind (I've Got My Eyes on You)" UK CD single in 1990; it also appeared as one of the bonus tracks on the Manic Nirvana reissue in 2007.
