= Chip Damiani =

American drummer (1945–2014)

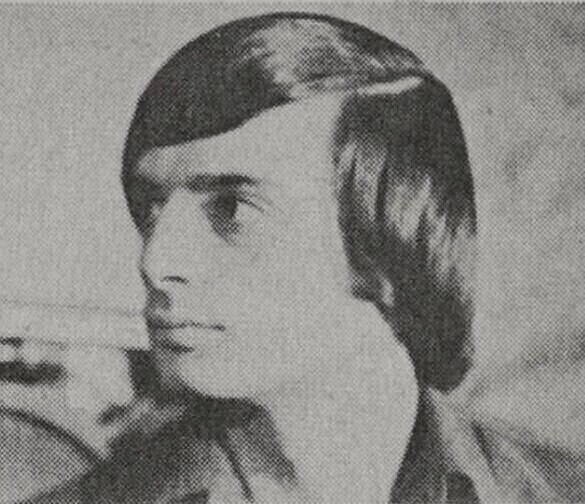
- Damiani in 1966

Background information
- Birth name: Rudolph Damiani
- Born: June 16, 1945; Waterbury, Connecticut, U.S.
- Died: February 23, 2014 (aged 68); Waterbury, Connecticut, U.S.
- Occupation: Drummer
- Formerly of: The Remains

Rudolph "Chip" Damiani (June 16, 1945 – February 23, 2014) was a founding member and drummer for the mid-1960s Boston garage rock band the Remains.

== Early life ==
Damiani was born in Waterbury to Rudolph, a surgeon at Waterbury Hospital, and Jeanette Long Damiani. He was raised in Wolcott, Connecticut. He was married to the late Maria Brancati Damiani and was the father of Robbin, Christopher (1977–2020), and Michael.

== Career ==
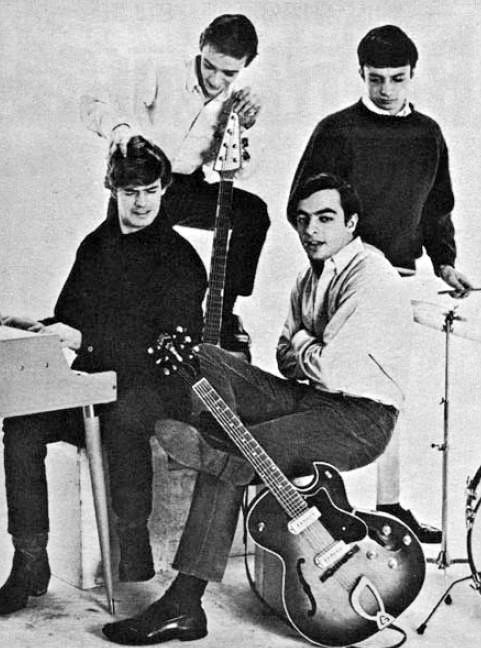
Damiani (top right) with the Remains in 1966

Damiani, together with his fellow students at Boston University, singer/guitarist Barry Tashian, keyboardist Bill Briggs, and bassist Vern Miller, formed the band the Remains, in 1964. The band, in their finest day appeared on The Ed Sullivan Show. They also were one of the opening acts for The Beatles' final U.S. tour in 1966, but this time without Damiani, who didn't think doing so was a good move for the band. He was one of the few musicians who appeared on the Ed Sullivan Show, NBC dance-rock show Hullabaloo and American musical variety series Shindig!. Damiani was credited on the band's 1966 album The Remains as a drummer and a backing vocalist. Their two successive singles ended up outside the Billboard Hot 100 and the band, not being satisfied with their label, Epic Records, quietly auditioned for Capitol. Damiani, however, didn't show up for their upcoming single and the tour. He eventually decided to quit to go back to university, and the band, having lost their faith in commercial success, broke up. Along with Damiani, the band reunited in 1998 for a European tour, which led to a permanent reunion in 2002. Most recently, Damiani was the president of Airtite Home Improvement, Inc.

== Death ==
Chip Damiani, New Haven, Connecticut resident, died of a massive brain hemorrhage at St. Mary's Hospital in Waterbury on February 23, 2014. He was 68.
