= New York City (The Peter Malick Group album) =

Studio album by the Peter Malick Group featuring Norah Jones
- Released: July 8, 2003
- Recorded: August–September 2000; May 11, 2003 (Note: Additional recording)
- Studio: Room 9 from Outer Space (South Boston, Massachusetts); Popsquad (West Hollywood, California)
- Genre: Blues; jazz
- Length: 30:04
- Label: Koch
- Producer: Peter Malick

The Peter Malick Group featuring Norah Jones chronology
New York City (2003)	New York City: The Remix Album (2004)

Norah Jones chronology
Live in New Orleans (2003)	New York City (2003)	Feels Like Home (2004)

Professional ratings
Review scores
Source	Rating
Allmusic	4/5 stars
Gaffa	4/6 stars
RTÉ	4/5 stars
Uncut	1.5/5 stars

New York City is an album by the Peter Malick Group featuring Norah Jones. It was recorded during August and September 2000, a few weeks before Jones made her own demos for Blue Note Records, and released three years later. Jones performs vocals on all seven tracks, and this album is more bluesy than Jones' debut album, Come Away with Me. One of the tracks of the album, "Strange Transmissions", was bundled with the Nokia 6230 mobile phone.

The album reached number 54 on the Billboard 200, number one on the Top Blues Albums chart, and number two on the Top Independent Albums chart. The Bastone & Burnz remix of "Strange Transmissions" peaked at number 23 on the Hot Dance Music/Club Play chart in June 2004.

The cover version of Bob Dylan's "Heart of Mine" was featured in the 2003 film Runaway Jury, being used in the closing credits.

== Track listing ==
No.	Title	Writer(s)	Length
1.	"New York City"	Peter Malick	5:06
2.	"Strange Transmissions"	Malick	4:06
3.	"Deceptively Yours"	Malick	4:17
4.	"All Your Love"	Magic Sam	4:33
5.	"Heart of Mine"	Bob Dylan	5:06
6.	"Things You Don't Have to Do"	Malick	3:09
7.	"New York City" (radio edit)	Malick	3:47

== Personnel ==
Credits adapted from the liner notes of New York City.

- Peter Malick – guitars, production (all tracks); vocals (track 6)
- Norah Jones – vocals (all tracks); piano (track 5)
- Eric Gardner – drums (tracks 1, 4, 5, 7)
- Marty Richards – drums (tracks 2, 3, 6)
- Danny McGouch – Mellotron (tracks 1, 7); Hammond B-3 (track 3); Wurlitzer piano (track 4)
- Mike Thompson – piano (tracks 2, 4); accordion (tracks 1, 7)
- Tom West – piano (track 6)
- Jeff Turmes – bass (all tracks)
- Hugh Fordin – executive production
- Ducky Carlisle – recording, mixing
- Bruce Witkin – additional engineering
- Nate Dubé – additional engineering
- Alan Silverman – mastering at Arf! Digital (New York City)
- Jeff Chenault – art direction, design

== Charts ==
Chart performance for New York City
Chart (2003–2004)	Peak position
Australian Albums (ARIA)	22
Austrian Albums (Ö3 Austria)	28
Danish Albums (Hitlisten)	30
Dutch Albums (Album Top 100)	32
New Zealand Albums (RMNZ)	18
Polish Albums (ZPAV)	42
Swiss Albums (Schweizer Hitparade)	93
UK Albums (OCC)	80
UK Jazz & Blues Albums (OCC)	4
US Billboard 200	54
US Independent Albums (Billboard)	2
US Top Blues Albums (Billboard)	1

== Certifications ==
Region	Certification	Certified units/sales
Australia (ARIA)	Gold	35,000^{^}
^{^} Shipments figures based on certification alone.
