= Live in Boston (Fleetwood Mac album) =

Live album by Fleetwood Mac
- Released: February 1985
- Recorded: 5–7 February 1970
- Venues: Boston Tea Party, 15 Lansdowne Street, Boston, MA
- Genre: Blues-rock
- Length: 34:30
- Label: Shanghai Records

Alternative cover
- Cover of the 1998 Snapper release (Vol.1)

Professional ratings
Review scores
Source	Rating
AllMusic	4/5 stars

Live in Boston (a.k.a. Boston Live and Jumping at Shadows) is a live album by British blues-rock band Fleetwood Mac that was first released in 1985.

== Recording and release ==
The songs on the album were recorded over three nights at the Boston Tea Party venue in Boston, between 5 and 7 February 1970. The recordings were made for a proposed live album which was to have been released during 1970. The project was shelved and the tapes remained unreleased, until Shanghai Records issued seven songs from the performances as Live in Boston in February 1985.

The album was reissued a few months later as Jumping at Shadows by Varrick Records. A number of other releases, with titles such as Boston Live, Oh Well "Live" or Live, featuring the same track listing as the original Live in Boston album were released by various labels worldwide during the late 1980s and early 1990s. Shanghai followed Live in Boston with a 2-LP set titled Cerulean, which included additional material taken from the same concerts, and functioned as a second volume to the original release.

In 1998, Snapper Music released an expanded three-volume CD set, titled Live in Boston: Remastered (later reissued as Live at the Boston Tea Party), which collected most of the available tracks from the Boston Tea Party concerts. These three volumes have subsequently been available individually or as a box set. All three volumes were reissued as a four LP set in 2003, under the title Live at the Boston Tea Party. In 2013, the set was repackaged as simply Boston, including new album art based on the band's 1970 tour poster and photographs of the band members' faces on each of five beer coasters.

Tim Sommer of The Observer said that the album "showcase[s] Green's stellar blend of economy and ferocity" and that "the real scene-stealer on these recordings are Jeremy Spencer’s ecstatic rockabilly covers."

== Live in Boston (Shanghai, 1985) track listing ==
=== Side 1 ===
1. "Oh Well" (Peter Green) – 3:36
2. "Like It This Way" (Danny Kirwan) – 4:18
3. "World in Harmony" (Kirwan, Green) – 3:46
4. "Only You" (Kirwan) – 4:26

=== Side 2 ===
1. "Black Magic Woman" (Green) – 6:25
2. "Jumping at Shadows" (Duster Bennett) – 5:00
3. "Can't Hold On" (Elmore James) – 6:59

== Live in Boston: Remastered (Snapper, 1998) track listing ==
=== Volume one ===
1. "Black Magic Woman" (Green) – 6:45
2. "Jumping at Shadows" (Bennett) – 4:48
3. "Like It This Way" (Kirwan) – 4:28
4. "Only You" (Kirwan) – 4:23
5. "Rattlesnake Shake (Green) – 24:38
6. "I Can't Hold Out" (James) – 6:35
7. "Got to Move" (James) – 3:25
8. "The Green Manalishi (With the Two-Prong Crown)" (Green) – 12:52

=== Volume two ===
1. "World in Harmony" (Kirwan, Green) – 4:10
2. "Oh Well" (Green) – 3:12
3. "Rattlesnake Shake" (Green) – 25:36
4. "Stranger Blues" (James, Marshall Sehorn) – 3:55
5. "Red Hot Mama" (James) – 4:03
6. "Teenage Darling" (Jeremy Spencer) - 4:16
7. "Keep A-Knocking" (Richard Wayne Penniman) – 4:56
8. "Jenny Jenny" (Enotris Johnson, Penniman) – 7:40
9. "Encore Jam" (Green, Kirwan, Spencer, Joe Walsh) – 13:25

=== Volume three ===
1. "Jumping at Shadows" (Bennett) – 4:17
2. "Sandy Mary" (Green) – 5:21
3. "If You Let Me Love You" (B. B. King) – 10:30
4. "Loving Kind" (Kirwan) – 2:57
5. "Coming Your Way" (Kirwan) – 7:06
6. "Madison Blues" (James) – 4:49
7. "Got to Move" (James) – 3:56
8. "The Sun Is Shining" (James) – 3:11
9. "Oh Baby" (James) – 4:26
10. "Tiger" (Ollie Jones) – 3:44
11. "Great Balls of Fire" (Jack Hammer, Otis Blackwell) – 3:16
12. "Tutti Frutti" (Joe Lubin, Penniman, Dorothy LaBostrie) – 6:45
13. "On We Jam" (Green, Kirwan, Spencer, John McVie, Mick Fleetwood) – 7:56

== Personnel ==
Fleetwood Mac

- Peter Green – guitar, vocals, six string bass on "Green Manalishi"
- Jeremy Spencer – guitar, vocals, piano, percussion
- Danny Kirwan – guitar, vocals
- John McVie – bass guitar
- Mick Fleetwood – percussion, drums

guests:

- Eric Clapton and Joe Walsh – guitar on "Encore Jam"
- Dale Peters (probably) and Jimmy Fox (probably) - guest in unknown capacity on "Encore Jam"

=== Production (3CD Snapper release) ===
- Original mixes by Vic Maile, Andy Rose & Nick Reynolds
- Remixed by Nick Watson at SRT Studios, St Ives, England, June 1998, assisted by Neil Slaven
- Original sleeve by William Millar
