= New England Teen Scene: Unreleased! 1965–1968 =

Compilation album
- Released: 1996
- Recorded: 1965–1968
- Genre: Garage rock; pop rock
- Length: 1:19:30
- Label: Arf! Arf!
- Producer: Erik Lindgren

chronology
New England Teen Scene: The Next Generation (1994)	New England Teen Scene: Unreleased! 1965–1968 (1996)

New England Teen Scene: Unreleased! 1965–1968 is a compilation album, which features previously unreleased material by American garage rock bands from the New England region. The album was released in 1996, and is the third and final compilation issued on Arf! Arf! Records related to the New England garage scene. The featured artists on New England Teen Scene: Unreleased 1965–1968 were sorted after 15 years of research to uncover their obscured recordings. For the most part, the bands never had the opportunity to release any official material, with five of the tracks being completely uncredited, having been discovered in undocumented tapes. Perhaps the most prominent group on the album is Underground Cinema, the pre-band that manifested into the psychedelic rock band Ultimate Spinach. Speaking on the album, music historian Richie Unterberger wrote "New England bands in general seemed to favor melodic pop and Zombie-ish keyboards more than groups from other regions, and that's reflected in many of the selections on the disc".

== Track listing ==
1. The Morning After: "Things You Do" – 2:25
2. Unknown artist: "Now & Then" – 2:18
3. Unknown artist: "Figures of Clay" – 2:29
4. Innkeepers: "Trella" – 2:44
5. Innkeepers: "People Say" – 3:19
6. Terry and the Telstars: "Reasons" – 2:10
7. Terry and the Telstars: "Stop & Think" – 2:18
8. The Roadrunners: "Luv" – 2:26
9. The Roadrunners: "You're Thinking of Me" – 2:42
10. The Roadrunners: "Right Now" – 2:29
11. The Roadrunners: "Listen to Me" – 2:03
12. Dry Ice: "Mary Is Alone" – 3:49
13. Dry Ice: "Mr Sawyer" – 3:03
14. Underground Cinema: "Blackbird" – 3:14
15. Underground Cinema: "Sunday Morning" – 2:55
16. Underground Cinema: "Where Has the Time Gone?" – 2:39
17. The Lonely Things: "Our Generation" – 2:51
18. The Lucky Charms: "Innocence" – 1:41
19. The Gay Blades: "No One Else But You" – 2:10
20. The Gay Blades: "All I Want" – 3:14
21. The Emeralds: "I Long for You" – 2:54
22. The Emeralds: "Mister, You're a Better Man Than I" – 2:44
23. The Tremblers: "The Girl That I Once Knew" – 2:36
24. The Tremblers: "Windstorm" – 2:19
25. Unknown artist: "Instrumental Track #1" – 1:58
26. Unknown artist: "Instrumental Track #2" – 1:59
27. Unknown artist: "Mystery Track" – 4:32
28. Dry Ice: "Mary Is Alone '68" – 2:32
29. Dry Ice: "Lucy Mae" – 2:19
30. Dry Ice: "Sunny Day" – 2:38
