= Ultimate Spinach III =

Studio album by Ultimate Spinach
- Released: 1969
- Recorded: December 2–11, 1968
- Studios: Mayfair Studios, New York City
- Genres: Psychedelic rock; acid rock; pop rock
- Length: 34:09
- Label: MGM
- Producer: Alan Lorber

Ultimate Spinach chronology
Behold & See (1968)	Ultimate Spinach III (1969)	The Box (2000)

Singles from Ultimate Spinach III
- 1. "(Just Like) Romeo & Juliet" Released: 1969

Ultimate Spinach III is the third and final studio album by the American psychedelic rock band Ultimate Spinach, and was released on MGM Records in 1969.

== Background ==
A few days before the production for Ultimate Spinach III began in late 1968, the group was disbanded for personal differences with their record producer Alan Lorber. However, the third album needed to be produced due to contractual obligations with MGM Records.

Lead vocalist/guitarist Barbara Hudson and drummer Russell Levine remained with Ultimate Spinach despite the official disbanding. The Ultimate Spinach sextet was completed with four new musicians from other Boston local rock bands.

This album had no input from Ian Bruce-Douglas. Ted Myers and Tony Scheuren, ex-bandmates in Chamaeleon Church, wrote most of the songs (either individually or collaboratively), while the rest of the band was reunited only for exhausting rehearsals and recording sessions, made in just nine days in Mayfair Studios, New York, in December 1968. The result was a mix of psychedelic, hard rock and pop styles.

After the critical and commercial failure with this record, Ultimate Spinach was disbanded in mid-1969.

== Track listing ==
Side A
No.	Title	Writer(s)	Length
1.	"(Just Like) Romeo & Juliet" (The Reflections cover)	Bob Hamilton, Freddie Gorman (Note: The album erroneously credits "R. Wylie - T. Williams" as the writers instead. The apparent reason for this confusion is that Wylie and Williams are the writers of "Can't You Tell By the Look in My Eyes", which appears on the B-side of the Reflections' single.)	2:38
2.	"Some-Days You Just Can't Win"	Ted Myers, Tony Scheuren	3:28
3.	"Daisy"	Jeff Baxter	2:18
4.	"Sincere"	Myers	3:29
5.	"Eddie's Rush"	Traditional, arranged by Baxter, Barbara Hudson, Mike Levine, Russ Levine, Myers, Scheuren	6:50

Side B
No.	Title	Writer(s)	Length
1.	"Strange-Life Tragicomedy"	Myers, Scheuren	4:13
2.	"Reasons"	Scheuren	3:51
3.	"Happiness Child"	Myers	4:42
4.	"Back Door Blues"	Myers	3:02
5.	"The World Has Just Begun"	Myers, Scheuren	3:19

== Personnel ==
- Barbara Jean Hudson – lead and backing vocals, guitar
- Ted Myers – lead vocals, guitar
- Jeff Baxter – lead guitar, steel guitar, vibraphone, backing vocals
- Tony Scheuren – organ, piano, acoustic guitar, lead and backing vocals
- Mike Levine – bass guitar
- Russell Levine – drums
