= Ford Theatre (band) =

American psychedelic rock band

- Origin: Boston, Massachusetts, United States
- Genres: Psychedelic rock
- Years active: 1966-1971
- Label: ABC
- Past members: Harry Palmer; John Mazzarelli; Butch Webster; Joey Scott; Jimmy Altieri; Robert Tamagni

Ford Theatre was an American psychedelic rock band from Boston, Massachusetts, that were active between 1966 and 1971. Their sound was similar to other Boston-based psychedelic rock bands of the era.

== History ==
The band formed from the members of The Continentals (Jimmy Altieri, John Mazzarelli, Robert Tamagni, and Butch Webster), who then recruited Harry Palmer and Joe Scott. Although they existed during the period, the group disassociates itself with the Bosstown Sound.

Ford Theatre was one of the most promising bands of the 1960s that were influenced by the bands such as the Kingsmen, the Beatles and the Byrds, although they recorded only two albums, both under the ABC Records label. The band's first album, Trilogy for the Masses, was produced by Bob Thiele in 1968. The album's band tracks were done at Fleetwood Studios in Revere, Massachusetts, and the vocals were at Capitol Studios in New York City. A year later their second album, Time Changes, was produced by Bill Szymczyk. The second album was done at the Hit Factory in New York City.

After 1969, the band disappeared from records and their memory was overshadowed by the more successful bands of the 1970s. The band could not get a new deal for a third album that was already partially recorded, and the members decided to disband Ford Theatre in 1971.

== Band members ==
- Harry Palmer - guitar (died 10-25-2024)
- John Mazzarelli - keyboards, vocals
- Butch Webster - lead guitar
- Joey Scott - lead vocals
- Jimmy Altieri - bass, vocals
- Robert Tamagni drums, vocals

== Discography ==
=== Singles ===
- "From a Back Door Window" b/w "Theme for the Masses" (ABC 11118) 1968
- "I've Got the Fever" b/w "Jefferson Airplane" (ABC 11227) 1969
- "Time Changes" b/w "Wake Up in the Morning" (Columbia(EMI) 1C006-90288) 1969
- "At the Station" b/w "Wake Up in the Morning" (Stateside 5C 006-90 589) 1969

=== Albums ===
- Trilogy for the Masses (ABC ABCS-658) 1968
- Time Changes (ABC ABCS 681) 1969
