= Listening (band) =

American rock band

- Origin: Boston, Massachusetts, United States
- Genres: Psychedelic rock, acid rock, hard rock
- Years active: 1967–1969
- Labels: Vanguard
- Past members: Peter Malick; Walter Powers; Michael Tschudin; Ernie Kamanis

Listening was an American psychedelic rock band formed in Boston, Massachusetts in the late 1960s.

Listening became the leading Boston stage act in 1968 and was an example of what is now called the Bosstown Sound. The band released one self-titled album on the Vanguard label and one non-LP promo single. The group is famous for its ambiguous song lyrics, sometimes related to marijuana and psychedelic acid trips.

The group's sound reflected a confluence of hard rock and psychedelic influences, with added elements of progressive rock. Nevertheless, some of songs, such as "9/8 Song" and "Cuando" were gentler. The band's approach had a great impact in the period and helped define the Bosstown Sound. Michael Tschudin, a leading figure, was an accomplished and inventive piano player and organist. Bassist Walter Powers had previously played with the Lost and ended up in Boston punk groups until the 1970s.

== Discography ==
- Listening (1968) (promo LP)
- "Hello You" b/w "Life Stories" (promo single)
