= The Voices Four =

Hebrew folk-rock band

- Origin: New York City, New York, United States
- Genres: Jewish rock, folk rock
- Years active: 1967-1971
- Labels: Monitor
- Past members: David Koffman, Ron Isaacs, Marvin Rosen, Helena Moche, Tony Wolff

The Voices Four, also known by its Hebrew name, Arbaah Kolot, was an American Jewish folk rock band founded in New York City in 1967. The band was founded by David Koffman, Ron Isaacs, Marvin Rosen, Helena Moche, and Tony Wolff. The founding members were students of multiple colleges and Jewish educational institutions, including Columbia University, Oberlin College, Stern College, and the Jewish Theological Seminary.

== History ==
David Koffman, a bass guitarist and singer from Erie, Pennsylvania, had been studying at the Jewish Theological Seminary in New York when he met Ron Isaacs and Marv Rosen, who comprised a minor singing duo at the seminary. While Isaacs and Rosen were not initially impressed by Koffman's skills, they eventually came together in 1967 to formalize the idea of creating a group. Later that year, soprano singer Helena Moche and electric guitarist Tony Wolff joined in on what would soon become The Voices Four. The band was noted as a curiosity by student publications for its unique approach to traditional Jewish music, especially after their successful 1968 concerts at Columbia University's Wollman Auditorium and New York City's Town Hall theatre.

Having raised its profile through performances around the United States, The Voices Four signed with Monitor Records, which was eventually acquired by Smithsonian Folkways. Under Monitor Records, The Voices Four released two albums, Arbaah Kolot and Our Rock and Our Redeemer, which contained a mix of traditional, liturgical, and popular music. On the sleeve for the album Arbaah Kolot, the group's sound is described as "Jewish soul," a genre which every song that they perform is rendered in.

The Voices Four remained relatively obscure, and it is unknown when exactly the band was dissolved, though there is no record of its activities beyond 1971. Some members of the band, like Ron Isaacs, went on to serve in Jewish clergy.
