= The Psychedelic Supermarket =

Music venue in Boston, Massachusetts

Coordinates: 42.349°N 71.100°W

The Psychedelic Supermarket was an underground music venue in Boston, Massachusetts, that was open in the 1960s, and became one of the core establishments of the city's psychedelic rock scene. It stood at 590 Commonwealth Avenue inside a parking garage that was converted into a club by promoter George Papadopoulos in 1967. The Psychedelic Supermarket was active for two years before closing.

The venue was established in August 1967 by promoter George Papadopoulos. Papadopoulos, who was already an owner of a popular Boston-based folk club called the Unicorn, hastily put together the Psychedelic Supermarket in an abandoned parking garage to cash in on the scheduled performances dropped by the Crosstown Bus after it was shut down by police. On September 8, 1967, the Supermarket opened to an eight-day stay by Cream, just as the psychedelic rock group was preparing to record their second album Disraeli Gears. Cream utilized this time to practice their new material, including "Sunshine of Your Love" and "Strange Brew", before showcasing themselves to a national audience. Donna Summer, at the time using her real name Donna Gaines, debuted in this venue as lead singer of a rock band named "The Crow".

The Psychedelic Supermarket's greatest shortcoming was its need of renovation and refurbishing. The venue was described as a "very industrial place" that had walls littered with album covers, no windows, and could hold between 200 and 300 patrons, but in its beginning stages the Supermarket had no seats installed. Perhaps the only positive of being situated in a parking lot was the elevated ceiling which allowed for more lucrative light shows. Throughout its existence, the venue featured a mixture of nationally recognized acts such as the Canned Heat, Grateful Dead, Moby Grape, and Country Joe and the Fish, and local Boston bands like Eden's Children, the Freeborne, and Listening.

In 1969, Papadopoulos closed the original site of the Unicorn Coffee House (733-825 Boylston Street, Back Bay, Boston) and moved its operations into the Psychedelic Supermarket. The venue did not stay open for too long thereafter as Boston's psychedelic rock scene, also known as the Bosstown Sound, was on a decline. The building was converted into a movie theater known as the Nickelodeon, before being demolished for a science lab for Boston University.
