= Monitor Records (New York) =

US record label

Monitor Records is a record label from the United States specializing in classical and folk music.

== History ==
The label was started in 1956 by Michael Stillman of Leeds Music and Rose Rubin. They founded the label to provide music to Americans from the Soviet Union and the Eastern Bloc. Rubin and Stillman both served as company President at different points. Monitor was created to focus on classical and folk.

The first issues were from the Soviet Union featuring works by Bach and Prokofiev performed by Leonid Kogan and Sviatoslav Richter. For the first year, all issues were sourced from Russia, but in 1957 the label began recording young American artists. Monitor Records were available through the Diners Club record club from 1959 to 1961, an arrangement made out of "desperation" by Monitor management according to Rubin. Monitor releases first became available on reel-to-reel tapes in 1963 through an agreement with Musictapes, Inc. That year Monitor became distributed worldwide through Transglobal Music.

In 1966, Monitor began a budget series called "Monitor Collectors Series". At introduction, the series consisted of more than one-hundred releases. The primary focus was on Baroque music.

In 1967, Monitor became the first label to release music in North America by composer Josef Mysliveček.

In 1968, the label attempted to make an entry into the popular music field when they released singles and an album by The Freeborne.

In 1999, Rubin and Stillman donated the label and its catalog to Smithsonian Folkways Recordings. Although Folkways was already strong in most folk music, it felt that the Monitor acquisition filled their gap in belly dance music.

== Artists ==
Artists appearing on (but not necessarily signed to) Monitor include:

- Bayanihan Philippine National Folk Dance Company
- Bethany Beardslee
- Ramblin' Jack Elliott
- Walter Hautzig
- Ludwig Hoelscher
- Heinz Holliger
- Leonid Kogan
- Lili Kraus
- Anton Kuerti
- Lado
- David Oistrakh
- Igor Oistrakh
- Nadia Reisenberg
- Sviatoslav Richter
- Mstislav Rostropovich
- Brother John Sellers
- Sophie Svirsky
- Henryk Szeryng
- The Voices Four
