= Dirty Water Club =

London garage rock nightclub

The Dirty Water Club was a long-running (in a town where most tend to be short-lived) London club night featuring bands influenced by 1960s garage punk. It was named after The Standells' 1966 hit single "Dirty Water".

The club night started in October 1996 in the Tufnell Park neighbourhood of north London, at a venue called The Boston (The Standells' hit glorifies the U.S. city of Boston, Massachusetts). It hosted weekly live performances.

Past performers have included The White Stripes, The Fleshtones, Billy Childish (of Thee Headcoats, The Buff Medways, and The Musicians of the British Empire), The Woggles, The Von Bondies, The Dirtbombs, Thee Michelle Gun Elephant, The 5.6.7.8's, The Horrors and The Brian Jonestown Massacre. The club has also seen some original 1960s/70s performers, such as The Monks, Kim Fowley, GONN, Radio Birdman, The Rising Storm, and Sky Saxon of The Seeds, grace its stage with PJ Crittenden as the booker/DJ/promoter and Professor Blinding as the sound and equipment expert.

The club night's influence was widespread, with venues in both Australia and Italy starting up club nights named "Dirty Water" and with PJ Crittenden, the club's promoter and regular DJ being invited to perform at festivals all across Europe and in the USA.

The in-house record label, Dirty Water Records, was launched in 2004 with the debut single by The Dirty, followed up by a 7-inch EP by Thee Exciters in 2005 and then, after the re-release of the classic 1979 Lyres single How Do You Know? c/w Don't Give It Up Now in May 2007, the release schedule was increased to pretty much one release per month.

The Dirty Water Club held its last night at The Boston venue on 19 June 2009, the final bill being original 1960s garage band GONN, The Masonics and Speak & the Spells. The Professor wanted to concentrate on his main business and the remaining partner PJ decided not to continue under the "Dirty Water Club" name without him. Monthly live music events continued to take place under the auspices of Dirty Water Records and at a variety of venues. PJ is now retired from the gig promoting hobby but a 25th anniversary reunion show was planned for October 2021.
