= Las Vegas Grind =

Ls Vegas Grind Festival

Coordinates: 36.11662°N 115.1926°W

Las Vegas Grind was a festival held in 1999 and 2000 at the Gold Coast Hotel in Paradise, Nevada. The programs for these festivals consisted of bands that were inspired by, or actually were part of, the garage rock genre of music of the 1960s. Bands that played at these festivals included the Fabulous Wailers, the Trashmen, the Remains, the Standells, Lyres, and other regional bands from across the US and around the world.

The successor to these festivals is the Las Vegas Rockaround.
