= Billy Vera =

American singer/songwriter

- Born: William Patrick McCord; May 28, 1944 (age 82); Riverside, California, U.S.
- Genres: R&B, pop, rock
- Occupations: Singer, songwriter, actor, music historian
- Instruments: Vocals, guitar, piano
- Years active: 1962–present
- Labels: Atlantic, Alfa, Macola, Capitol, Rhino, Unidisc, Pool Party, Classic World
- Website: www.billyvera.com

Billy Vera (born William Patrick McCord; May 28, 1944) is an American singer, songwriter, actor, author, and music historian. He has been a singer and songwriter since the 1960s, his most successful record being "At This Moment", a US number 1 hit in 1987. He continues to perform with his group Billy Vera & The Beaters and won a Grammy Award in 2013.

== Life and career ==
Vera was born in Riverside, California, and is the son of the radio and television announcer Bill McCord. He grew up in Hartsdale, New York, and attended Our Lady of Mt. Carmel School and Archbishop Stepinac High School. His mother, singer Ann Ryan, was a member of The Ray Charles Singers backing Perry Como on his TV show and his hit records.

=== 1960s ===
Vera began his recording career in 1962 as a member of the Resolutions followed by the regional hit "My Heart Cries"/"All My Love" as Billy Vera & the Contrasts. He went on to a songwriting career in the 1960s, writing for Barbara Lewis, Fats Domino, The Shirelles and Ricky Nelson. He also wrote the garage band classic "Don't Look Back", performed by the Remains and later covered by Robert Plant.

In 1967, Vera with Chip Taylor, wrote "Storybook Children" and brought it to Atlantic Records. The groundbreaking decision to place former gospel singer Judy Clay with Vera in a white-black duet to record the song was a commercial and artistic success. "Storybook Children" is considered to be the first interracial love song to chart in the US. Prior to this, duo Sister Rosetta Tharpe and Red Foley had recorded "Have a Little Talk with Jesus" in 1952, which was a B-side.

The duo became big favorites at Harlem's Apollo Theater and their follow-up, "Country Girl-City Man" also charted. He had a solo hit single later that same year with the Bobby Goldsboro penned "With Pen in Hand", which was also the name of his next album.

=== 1970s thru 1990s ===
The 1970s were a slow period for Vera. In 1977, he issued a solo album called Out of the Darkness in the US, and as Private Clown in the UK. It failed to have an impact in either country. 1979 began with his song "I Really Got the Feeling", a number 1 hit for Dolly Parton. During that decade he served as conductor for many oldies acts, including the Shirelles and Ronnie Spector as well as fronting the band at the 1972 Reunion concert of Dion & the Belmonts. Before moving to Los Angeles in 1979, he played many New York area clubs with his band, which included Ben Beckley on drums, Micheal Montecalvo on drums, Tommy Wolk on bass, John Levanthal on guitar, and Joe Renda on keyboards.

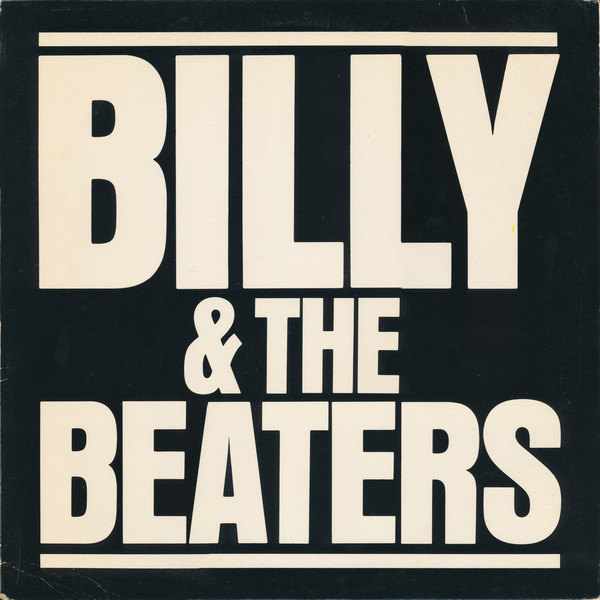
Cover art of Billy & the Beaters (1981)

Living in Los Angeles and writing songs for Warner Bros. Records, Vera and his old friend, bass player Chuck Fiore, decided to put together a band to play the local club scene. Modeling their band on Ray Charles's 1950s band, The Beaters were born. They featured a horn section, as well as a pedal steel guitar, along with drums, piano, Fiore's bass, and Vera on guitar and vocals. As a result of the buzz the band generated from their Monday midnight shows at the Troubadour, they were offered a recording contract by Alfa Records, a major Japanese record company that had recently opened an American office in Los Angeles. They recorded the band live, at the Roxy (video was produced by Paul Flattery and directed by Bruce Gowers), calling the album Billy & The Beaters. The 1981 album yielded the minor hits "I Can Take Care of Myself", which reached number 39 on the Billboard Hot 100 in the US, and "At This Moment", which (initially) charted at number 79. Both songs were credited to Billy & The Beaters.

The following year, Vera recorded a self-titled solo album, with instrumentation by The Muscle Shoals Sound Rhythm Section and produced by Jerry Wexler. However, Vera's record deal evaporated almost immediately upon the album's release, as Alfa Records closed its U.S. offices in July 1982. The Billy Vera album spun off no hits, and failed to chart. A small-label album release from 1983, The Mystic Sound of Billy Vera, similarly met with little commercial success.

Vera returned to playing the clubs of Southern California, and resumed calling his backing band "The Beaters", which featured an ever-shifting lineup of players. In 1985, a producer from the television show Family Ties was in the audience and heard the band play "At This Moment". The song was subsequently featured in 1985 as a backdrop for romantic interludes between lead character Alex P. Keaton (Michael J. Fox) and his girlfriend Ellen (Tracy Pollan). In real life, the two wed and are still married today. Viewers responded by clamoring for the song, and in 1986, Rhino Records released By Request: The Best of Billy Vera & the Beaters, which was essentially a reissue of most of the tracks from Billy & The Beaters, plus two tracks from Billy Vera. The single "At This Moment" became a number one hit on its re-release, reaching the top in January 1987, and remained on the charts for 21 weeks.

Aiming to capitalize on renewed interest in the group, Vera continued with his musical career, releasing another Billy Vera & the Beaters album on Capitol Records in 1988 called Retro Nuevo. While the album's single, "Between Like and Love" peaked at number 9 on the Adult Contemporary chart, it missed the Hot 100, where Vera has not charted since "At This Moment".

Before "At This Moment", Vera had a small career in movies and television including appearances in The Adventures of Buckaroo Banzai, Late for Dinner, The Doors and soap opera Days of Our Lives. "At This Moment" propelled his movie career as he and the Beaters were featured prominently in the Bruce Willis movie Blind Date. He appeared in one episode of the TV series Wiseguy and had several other roles on shows such as Baywatch, Boy Meets World, and a recurring role as Duke on Beverly Hills, 90210 as well as nine appearances on The Tonight Show Starring Johnny Carson. These roles would lead him into singing theme songs for TV shows, such as Empty Nest and The King of Queens, as well as voice acting on Cartoon Network cartoons. He served as band leader on Rick Dees' short-lived late-night talk show Into the Night on ABC in 1990. He also made a guest appearance in an episode of Double Rush in 1995.

During that period, Vera co-produced three Lou Rawls albums with his friend Michael Cuscuna, for Blue Note Records, including At Last, which reached number 1 on the Billboard jazz chart. Vera also produced Rawls's final album, Rawls Sings Sinatra, which remained on the jazz chart for over six months. Rawls recorded seven of Vera's songs, including "If I Were A Magician" (1989), "Room with a View" and "You Can't Go Home". In 1990, Vera's tune "Papa Come Quick (Jody & Chico)" was included on Bonnie Raitt's album, Luck of the Draw. Vera also recorded as a duo with Nona Hendryx on the 1992 album You Have To Cry Some Time.

=== 2000s and 2010s ===
Currently, the Beaters are still playing the Southern California club scene, and Vera continues his work as a music historian. He has helped produce, archive, and write liner notes for over 200 reissue albums and sets, from artists such as Little Richard, Sam Cooke, Louis Jordan, Ray Charles, and Louis Prima, among others.

Vera has been the voice for AM/PM Mini Mart commercials since 1999 and is one of the top voice-over artists in Los Angeles. "At This Moment" was included on Michael Bublé's number one album, Crazy Love. Vera's CD Hopeless Romantic: The Best Of Billy Vera & The Beaters, was issued on Shout Factory Records, and The Billy Vera Story was released on Rock Beat Records. With his old friend Evie Sands, Billy recorded "Queen of Diamonds/Jack of Hearts", a CD featuring songs by their early mentor Chip Taylor.

In 2015, Vera released Billy Vera: Big Band Jazz with arrangements by Chris Walden, a tribute to the black songwriters of the 1920s, 30s and 40s. It was issued on Varese-Sarabande Records, and Vera has appeared with a big 18-piece band in New York City, Hollywood, and at various jazz festivals.

Vera returned to the studio in 2019 to record the album Timeless with three of the Beaters, augmented by some of LA's top sidemen.

Vera also has a star on the Hollywood Walk of Fame at the corner of Vine Street and Yucca Street, right in front of the Capitol Records Building in Hollywood. He won a 2013 Grammy Award for Best Album Notes for the Ray Charles box set Singular Genius: The Complete ABC Singles.

Book publishing came calling and in 2016, his first effort, Vintage Neon: Los Angeles, 1979, featuring photographs from Vera's nocturnal hunts for old neon signs was released. His second book, a memoir entitled Harlem to Hollywood was released in 2017. Reviews hailed it as "an astounding story...the purest treatise on the subject ever produced." Award-winning documentarian Alan Swyer has directed a documentary on Billy Vera, also titled Harlem to Hollywood now available on Amazon. For BMG Books, Billy has written "Rip It Up: The Specialty Records Story", for release in November 2019. In 2020, Vera's first novel, A Dollop of Toothpaste, was issued. It's a dystopian story and political satire in which the Mafia returns to their rightful place in society.

== Discography ==
=== Albums ===
- Storybook Children (with Judy Clay; Atlantic, 1968)
- With Pen in Hand (Atlantic, 1968)
- Out of the Darkness (Midsong International, 1977)
- Billy & the Beaters (Alfa, 1981) (US No. 118)
- Billy Vera (Alfa, 1982)
- The Mystic Sound of Billy Vera (Mystic, 1983)
- Retro Nuevo (Billy Vera & the Beaters, Capitol, 1988)
- You Have To Cry Sometime (with Nona Hendryx, Shanachie, 1992)
- Oh What a Nite (Billy Vera & the Beaters, Pool Party, 1996)
- Queen of Diamonds / Jack of Hearts (Billy Vera & Evie Sands, 2014)
- Big Band Jazz (Varese-Sarabande, 2015)
- Timeless (Vera Cruz Music, 2019)

=== Compilation albums ===
- By Requestː The Best of Billy Vera and the Beaters (Rhino, 1987) (US No. 17, CAN No. 13)
- Not For Sale (Chance, 1999)
- At This Moment: A Retrospective (Varese-Sarabande, 2002)
- Hopeless Romantic: The Best of Billy Vera & the Beaters (Shout! Factory, 2008)
- The Billy Vera Story (Rock Beat, 2011)
- His Greatest Love Songs (Vera Cruz Music, 2021)

=== Soundtracks ===
- Blind Date (Rhino, 1987) includes three songs by Billy Vera and The Beaters Let You Get Away, Oh What a Nite and Anybody Seen Her?

=== Singles ===
Year	Single	Chart positions							
Year	Single	US Pop	US A/C	US R&B	US Country	AUS	CAN	CAN A/C	NL
1967	"Storybook Children"; Billy Vera & Judy Clay	54	–	20	–	–	–	15	–
1968	"Country Girl – City Man"; Billy Vera & Judy Clay	36	–	41	–	–	–	–	–
1968	"When Do We Go"; Billy Vera & Judy Clay	107	–	–	–	–	–	–	–
1968	"With Pen in Hand"	43	25	–	–	–	12	–	–
1968	"I've Been Loving You Too Long"	121	–	–	–	–	–	–	–
1969	"The Bible Salesman"	112	–	–	–	–	–	–	–
1981	"I Can Take Care of Myself"; Billy & The Beaters	39	–	–	–	–	–	–	–
1981	"At This Moment"; Billy & The Beaters	79	–	–	–	–	–	–	–
1987	"At This Moment"; Billy Vera & The Beaters (reissue)	1	1	70	42	11	1	1	26
1987	"She Ain't Johnnie"	–	–	–	93	–	–	–	–
1988	"Between Like and Love"	–	9	–	–	–	70	6	–
1992	"Something Like Nothing Before"	–	–	–	–	–	–	–	53
"–" denotes releases that did not chart or were not released in that territory.

=== TV show theme songs ===
- "Life Goes On", Empty Nest (TV series)
- "Answers", Roomies (TV series)
- "You've Got Me", Baja Oklahoma (TV movie)
- "Baby All My Life I Will Be Driving Home to You", The King of Queens
- "Dead Solid Perfect", "Dead Solid Perfect (HBO Movie)"

Movie Soundtracks

- "Enemies Like You and Me" performed with Ruth Pointer on the soundtrack to Iron Eagle II
