= The Clown Died in Marvin Gardens =

Studio album by Beacon Street Union
- Released: August 1968
- Genre: Psychedelic rock
- Label: MGM
- Producer: Wes Farrell

The Clown Died in Marvin Gardens is the second album from Beacon Street Union, a psychedelic rock group based in Boston, Massachusetts.

== Overview ==
The album was released in 1968. The dead clown on the cover was also used previously in 1967, by Joel Brodsky on The Doors's album Strange Days. The album peaked on the Billboard Top LP's at No. 173.

AllMusic rated the album three stars, stating "The tragedy of The Clown Died in Marvin Gardens is that it could have been so much more."

== Track listing ==
1. "The Clown Died in Marvin Gardens"
2. "The Clown's Overture"
3. "Angus of Aberdeen"
4. "Blue Suede Shoes"
5. "A Not Very August Afternoon"
6. "Now I Taste the Tears"
7. "King of the Jungle"
8. "May I Light Your Cigarette"
9. "Baby, Please Don't Go"

== Personnel ==
- John Lincoln Wright - vocals
- Paul Tartachny - guitars
- Robert Rhodes - keyboards, brass
- Wayne Ulaky - bass
- Richard Weisberg - drums

== Charts ==
Chart (1968)	Peak position
US Billboard Top LP's	173
