= Peter Malick =

American guitarist

- Malick in 2007

Background information
- Born: November 28, 1951 (age 74); Brookline, Massachusetts, U.S.
- Genres: Blues; rock
- Occupations: Musician; record producer
- Instrument: Guitar
- Years active: 1967–present
- Labels: Capricorn; E1
- Formerly of: Listening; James Montgomery Band
- Website: petermalick.com

Peter Malick (born November 28, 1951) is an American blues guitarist, record producer, and entrepreneur. He is the CEO of InboundAV.

== Career ==
=== Music ===
In the late 1960s, Peter Malick was a member of the band Listening. He later played guitar with the blues pianist Otis Spann.

Over the years, Malick has backed up and toured with blues musicians such as Muddy Waters, Big Mama Thornton, and John Lee Hooker. Later, he was a conductor and music director for the national touring company of Hair. Malick next joined the James Montgomery Band, recording First Time Out and High Roller, both for Capricorn Records.

For the next 20 years, he made money at cards. He returned to music in the 1990s, recording Wrong Side of My Life (1998) and Sons of the Jet Age (2000). He won the W.C. Handy Award for historic album of the year in 2001 for the Otis Spann album Last Call. Two years later, he wrote and produced the album New York City, featuring Norah Jones.

From 2006 to 2009, Malick ran the recording studio Chessvolt Studios. In 2013–14, he cowrote and performed on the song "27 Years" with Jung Yong-hwa.

=== Entrepreneurship and marketing ===
Malick shifted his professional focus in 2013, becoming CMO of Westlake Pro Audio in Los Angeles.

In 2017, he left to pursue his own marketing business, first as co-founder of Lumen Foundry and later as founder and CEO of InboundAV, which catered to the professional audio and music industry. Malick has since led the company to expand its reach, acquiring a number of clients outside of the pro audio industry.

=== Talks and presentations ===
- 6 Steps to Supercharge Your Email Marketing (2017)
- Adventures in Woo. From Novice to Ninja (2017)
- 5 Reasons Your Online Marketing Isn't Working—and How to Fix It (January 2020)
- Website Strategies in the New Normal (2020)
- Build Your Million-Dollar E-commerce Marketing Stack on a Shoestring (January 2021)

== Discography ==
Solo

- Wrong Side of My Life (1998)
- Sons of the Jet Age with Amyl Justin (2000)
- New York City (as the Peter Malick Group, 2003)
- Chance & Circumstance (as the Peter Malick Group, 2003)
- New York City: The Remix Album (as the Peter Malick Group, 2004)
- The Chill Album (as the Peter Malick Group, 2005)

with James Cotton Blues Band

- Cut You Loose (1967)

with Listening

- Listening (1968)

with James Montgomery Band

- First Time Out (1973)
- High Roller (1974)

with Butch Norton

- Duets from the Spin Dry Cycle (2010)
