= Hillbilly Ranch =

Country music club

Coordinates: 42.35162°N 71.06676°W

The Hillbilly Ranch was a Country and Western club in New England that was open between 1939 and 1980. Located between Park_Square_(Boston) and the Combat Zone, Boston, it featured house bands that included Tex Logan, The Lilly Brothers, and Don Stover.

== History ==
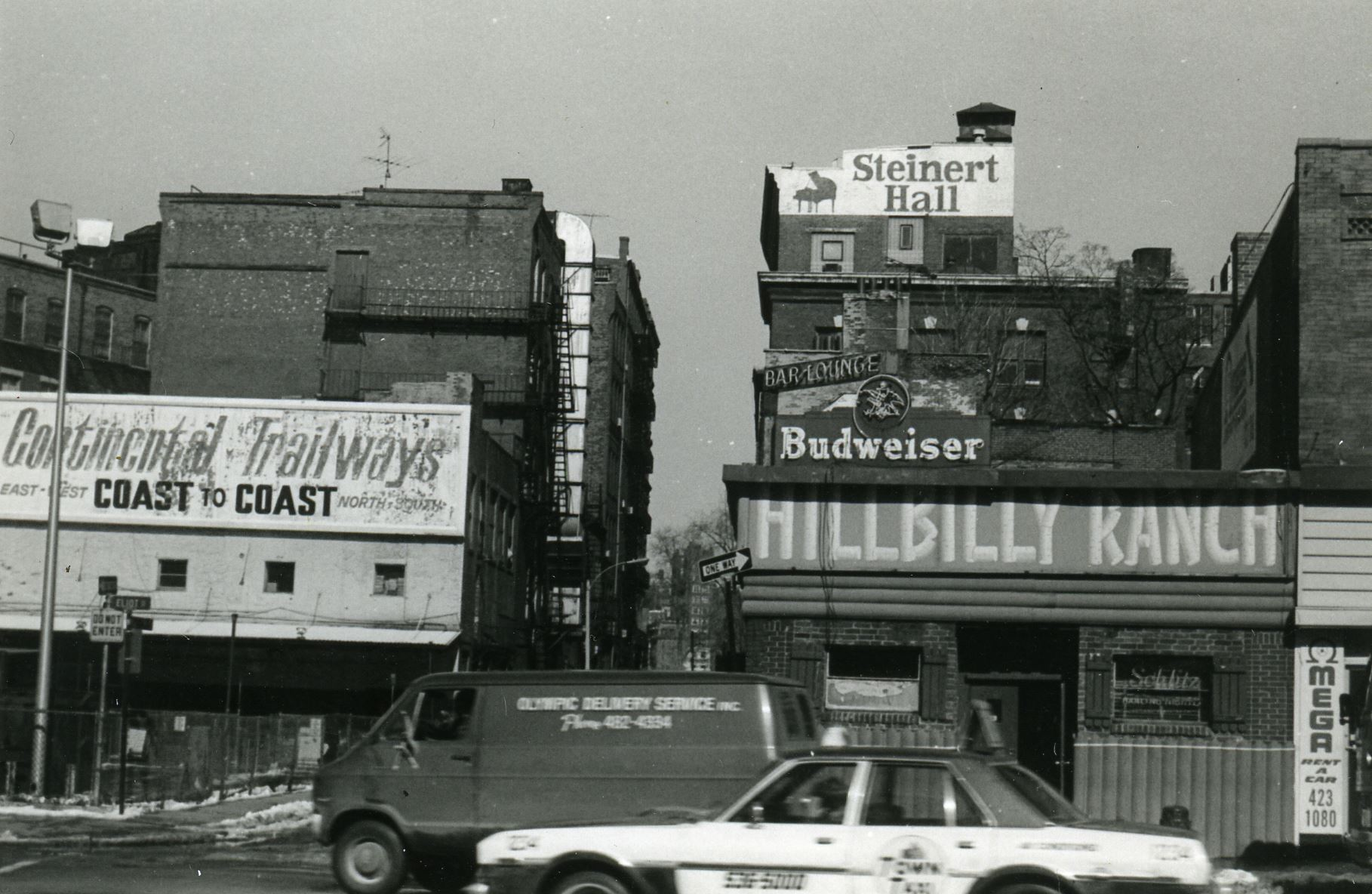
Image of the Hillbilly Ranch in the 1970s.

The Hillbilly Ranch was founded in 1939 as a restaurant by Italian immigrant Frank Segalini. The restaurant struggled in the 1940's and Segalini converted the space to a Country and Western club. George W. Bush was a regular visitor to the Hillbilly Ranch while attending Harvard Business School.

The club caught fire in 1980 and was re-opened a month later. The incident was memorialized in the song "They Tore Down the Hillbilly Ranch" by John Lincoln Wright. The Hillbilly Ranch finally closed in 1980 after the city took the land through eminent domain and Segalini was unable to secure a liquor license at another location.
