= The Rising Storm (band) =

American rock band

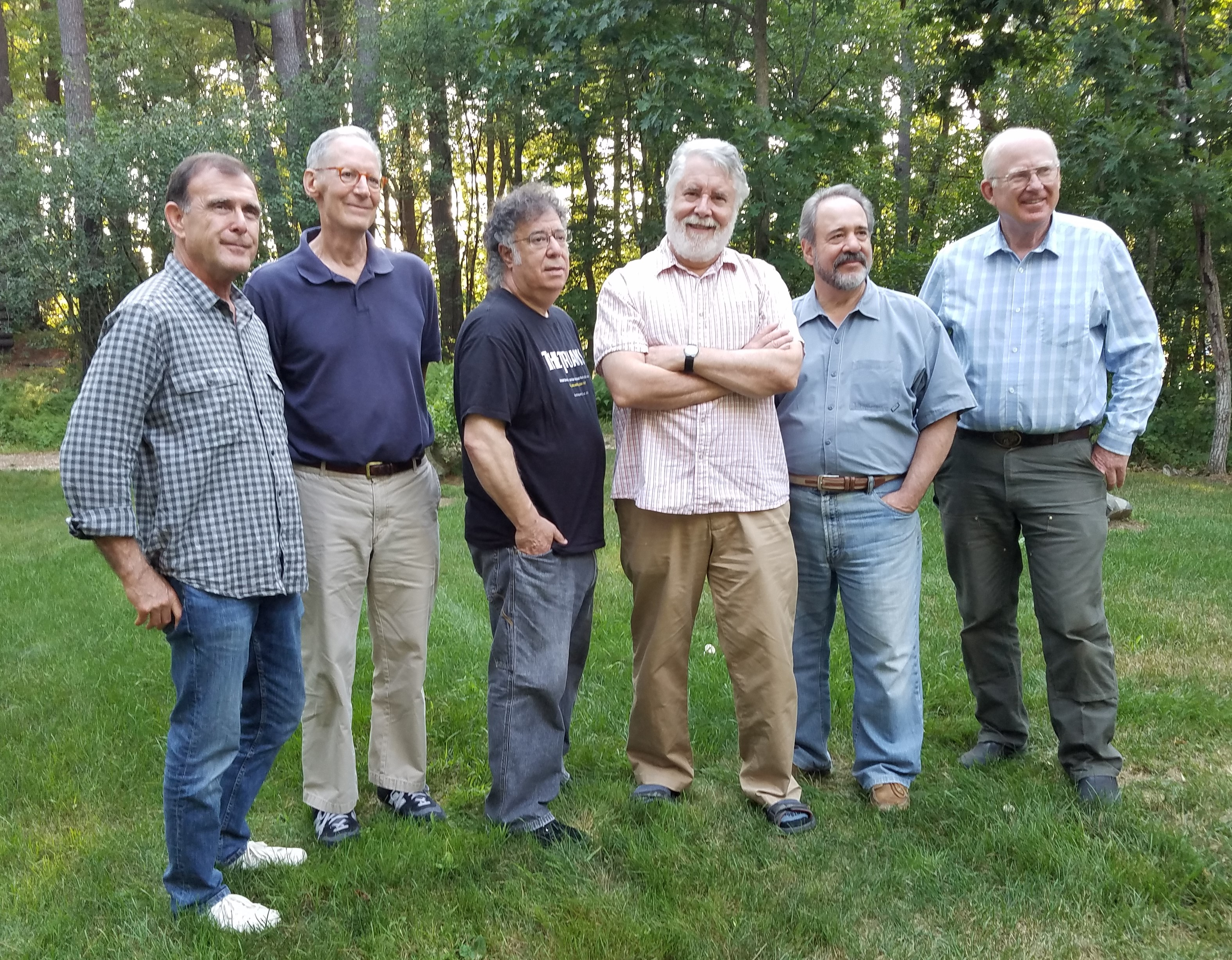
- The Rising Storm in 2016. (left to right) Bob Cohan, Todd Cohen, Tom Scheft, Tony Thompson, Rich Weinberg, Charlie Rockwell

Background information
- Origin: Phillips Academy, Andover, Massachusetts, United States
- Genres: Garage rock, folk rock
- Years active: 1965–present
- Labels: Remnant Records, Arf! Arf! Records, Stanton Park Records, Sundazed Music
- Website: http://www.rising-storm.com

The Rising Storm is an American rock group that was active at Phillips Academy in Andover, Massachusetts, United States, between 1965 and 1967. Their music is considered to belong in the folk rock and garage rock genres. The original members of the group were Bob Cohan (guitar), Todd Cohen (bass), Charlie Rockwell (keyboards), Tom Scheft (drums), Tony Thompson (guitar, lead vocal), and Rich Weinberg (guitar, vocals).

The Rising Storm is most notable for their 1967 album, Calm Before, which is cited by rock and roll historian Richie Unterberger in Allmusic as being "one of the rarest and most respected garage band albums." Unterberger devoted a chapter of his 1998 book, Unknown Legends of Rock 'n' Roll, to The Rising Storm. More than fifty years after the group's founding, mint copies of Calm Before can fetch four figure sums among vinyl record collectors interested in the garage rock era. In 2018, Calm Before was re-mastered and reissued on vinyl by Sundazed Music.

The rarity of this album has been the subject of articles in the Boston Globe, Boston Magazine, the Washington Post, Mojo Magazine, and a feature on NPR's All Things Considered. In addition to Calm Before and the many authorized and unauthorized reissues it has spawned, the Rising Storm has released two other albums, Alive Again at Andover in 1983 and Second Wind in 1999.

The band is still active and has reunited to perform on multiple occasions: in 1981, when they played at The Rathskeller in Boston, with songwriter and record producer Andy Paley sitting in for Cohen on bass; in 1982, when they played at their 15th class reunion in Andover; in 1992, when they played at their 25th class reunion and gigs at T.T. the Bear's Place in Cambridge, MA and Maxwell's in Hoboken, NJ; in 1999, when they opened for the first Boston reunion of the Remains at the Paradise Rock Club; in 2002, when they played at their 35th class reunion; in 2007, when they played at the Dirty Water Club in London and opened for the Yardbirds at the Primitive Festival in Rotterdam, with progressive musician and composer Erik Lindgren on bass; in 2014, when they performed at the WMBR Pipeline 25 Festival, celebrating "50 Years of Boston Rock", with Cohen returning as the group's bass player; and in June 2017, when they returned to Andover to play for the 50th reunion of the Phillips Academy Class of 1967, an event that was the subject of a feature story in The New York Times.

A short documentary film chronicling the band's origin, music, and 50-year history is in limited release.

In April 2023, a profile of the Rising Storm was added to digital archives of The Music Museum of New England .

== Discography ==
- Calm Before, Remnant BBA-3571 (USA), LP 1967
- Calm Before, Eva 12012 (France), LP 1982 (unauthorized reissue)
- "Baby Please Don't Go", "Message To Pretty" and "Don't Look Back" on Endless Journey - Phase 1, Psycho 1 (England), LP 1982 (unauthorized release)
- "Frozen Laughter" on The Magic Cube, Eva-Tone 116811 (France), LP 1982 (unauthorized release)
- "The Rain Falls Down" on Psychedelic Archives - USA Garage #1, Strange Things (England), Cassette Tape 1990 (unauthorized release)
- Alive Again at Andover, Arf! Arf! AA-007 (USA), LP 1983
- Calm Before, Stanton Park SRE-001 (USA), LP 1992
- Calm Before & Alive Again at Andover, Arf! Arf! AA-034 (USA), CD 1992
- Ain't Dead Yet, Arf! Arf! AAV-001 (USA), Video 1993
- "A Message To Pretty" on Sixties Rebellion #8 – Mondo Mutiny, Way Back MMLP-65001 (Germany), LP 1994 (unauthorized release)
- "Signed D.C." and "Trying to Fool" on Frozen Laughter - A Tribute to the Rising Storm, Stanton Park STP-021 (USA), 7"EP 1994
- "Love Starvation" and "Signed D.C." on New England Teen Scene - The Next Generation, Arf! Arf! AA-044 (USA), CD 1994
- "She Loved Me" on The Arf! Arf! Blitzkrieg 32-Track Sampler, Arf! Arf! AA-068 (USA), CD 1997
- "Frozen Laughter" on promotional CD included with Unknown Legends of Rock 'n' Roll by Richie Unterberger, 1998 (cited below in note 2)
- Second Wind, Arf!Arf! AA-083 (USA), CD 1999
- "Baby Please Don't Go" on The Arf! Arf! [El Cheapo] 2-CD Sampler, Arf! Arf! AACC-089/090 (USA), CD 2001
- "I'm Coming Home" and "She Loved Me" on The Rising Storm, Penniman PENN45024 (Spain), 45 rpm 2016
- "Frozen Laughter" on Sky Girl, compilation by J. Dechery and DJ Sundae, Efficient Space ES002 (Australia), LP and CD 2016
- Calm Before, Sundazed (USA), LP 5550 2018
