= Orpheus (band) =

American rock band

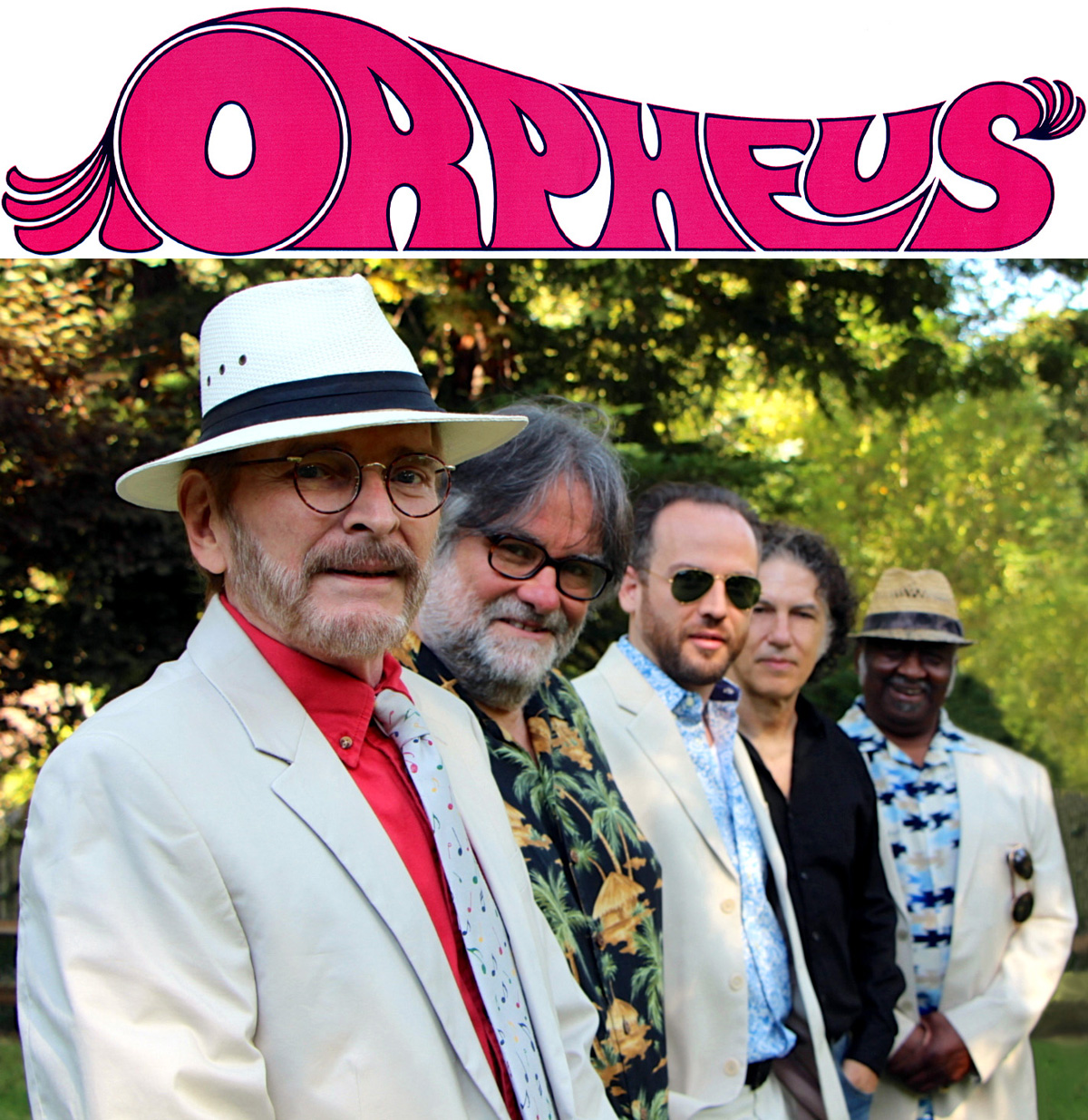
- The group in 2014

Background information
- Origin: Worcester, Massachusetts, United States
- Genres: Pop rock; soft rock; folk rock
- Years active: 1967–1971, 1988–1989, 2014–present
- Labels: MGM; Bell; BAM (Bruce Arnold Music)
- Website: www.orpheusband.com

Orpheus is an American rock band originally from Worcester, Massachusetts, that enjoyed popularity in the 1960s and early 1970s, featuring lead singer/songwriter Bruce Arnold (1946-2022). The original band members, including Stephen Martin, Jack McKennes, Eric "Snake" Gulliksen, and Harry Sandler, along with Robert Emmet Dunlap and Kathi Taylor, also performed for many years in New England as Orpheus Reborn.

== History ==
Orpheus is an American rock band best known for its string of soft rock hits during the late 1960s and early 1970s. The band was formed in 1967 by Bruce Arnold and Jack McKennes, evolving from their earlier folk duo, The Villagers. Orpheus signed with MGM Records and was associated with the ‘Bosstown Sound’ marketing campaign. Orpheus toured with major acts such as Cream, The Who, and Janis Joplin. They had two charted Billboard Hot 100 singles, "Can't Find the Time" was released on MGM Records and reached #80 on the Billboard Hot 100 singles in 1969. “Brown Arms in Houston,” released on MGM Records, charted on the Billboard Hot 100 singles, reaching #91. The song also charted in Canada, peaking at #81 on the RPM Top 100 Singles chart in 1969.

The band’s most notable hit, "Can't Find the Time" became a national success in 1969 and was later was covered by Hootie & the Blowfish for the 2000 film Me, Myself & Irene. Orpheus released several albums under MGM Records, including Orpheus (1968), Ascending (1968), and Joyful (1969), each featuring lush orchestrations and introspective lyrics that set them apart from their contemporaries in the Boston music scene.

Though the group disbanded in December 1969, Arnold reformed Orpheus in 1971 with a new lineup, releasing a self-titled album that year. Over the years, Orpheus has experienced several revivals, performing under names like Orpheus Reborn and continuing to tour and record into the 2010s.

== Musical style ==
Orpheus's music blends elements of pop, jazz, and classical music, with smooth vocal harmonies and richly orchestrated arrangements. Their sound has been described as psychedelic pop, sunshine pop, AM pop, baroque pop, and soft rock. Critics have noted the band’s melodic sophistication and introspective lyrics as defining features of their work, especially in comparison to other acts associated with the Bosstown Sound movement.

== Discography ==
=== Studio albums ===
Title	Year	Label	Notes	Ref.
Orpheus	1968	MGM Records	Debut album	"Orpheus (band)".
Ascending	1968	MGM Records	Second studio album	"Orpheus (band)".
Joyful	1969	MGM Records	Third studio album	"Orpheus (band)".
Orpheus	1971	Bell Records	Fourth studio album; same title as debut	"Orpheus (band)".
Orpheus Again	2010	BAM (Bruce Arnold Music)	Reunion album	"Orpheus (band)".

=== Compilation albums ===
Title	Year	Label	Notes	Ref.
The Best of Orpheus	1995	Ace Big Beat	Compilation album	"Orpheus (band)".
The Very Best of Orpheus	2001	Not specified	Compilation album	"Orpheus (band)".
The Complete Orpheus	2001	Not specified	Compilation album	"Orpheus (band)".

=== Charted singles ===
Peak chart positions of Orpheus singles
Song	Year	U.S. Billboard Hot 100	U.S. Cash Box Top 100	Canada RPM Top Singles
"Can't Find the Time"	1969	80	72	63
"Brown Arms in Houston"	1969	97	88	81

- Can't Find the Time (1968) (US/US Bub. #111 — 1968) (US #80 — 1969 / Canada #63)
- Brown Arms in Houston (1969) (US #91 — 1969 / Canada #81)

== Film ==
Year	Title	Notes	Ref.
2000	Me, Myself & Irene	Cover of their song "Can't Find the Time" by Hootie & the Blowfish featured on the soundtrack.	
2022	The Greatest Beer Run Ever	Original version of "Can't Find the Time" by Orpheus featured in the film.	

== Television appearances ==
- "Can't Find the Time" (1969 TV appearance)
- WABC interview clip (1968)
- "It's What's Happening, Baby!" (1965 TV special)

== Nomination ==
Year	Award	Category	Result	Ref.
2011	Los Angeles Music Awards	Showcase Artist of the Year	Nominated	

== Reunion and later activity ==
=== Orpheus Reborn ===
In the 2000s, Bruce Arnold formed Orpheus Reborn, a revival of the original group. The lineup included:

- Bruce Arnold – vocals, guitar
- Robert Emmet Dunlap – bass, vocals
- Steve Kawalek – drums
- Kathi Taylor – vocals
- Bernardo Baglioni – guitar
- Jim Scott – keyboards

=== Orpheus Again ===
In 2010, a new version of the group released the album Orpheus Again. This project featured:

- Bruce Arnold – vocals, guitar, songwriting
- Bernardo Baglioni – guitar, co-producer
- Robert Emmet Dunlap – bass, vocals
- Kathi Taylor – vocals
- Tom Major – drums
- Jimmy "Jay" Rossi – keyboards, arrangements
- Bill Mason – saxophone
- Jeff Stout – trumpet

== Associated acts ==
- Ultimate Spinach"Ultimate Spinach".
- Beacon Street Union"Bosstown Sound".
- Alan Lorber"Bosstown Sound".
