= Barry Tashian =

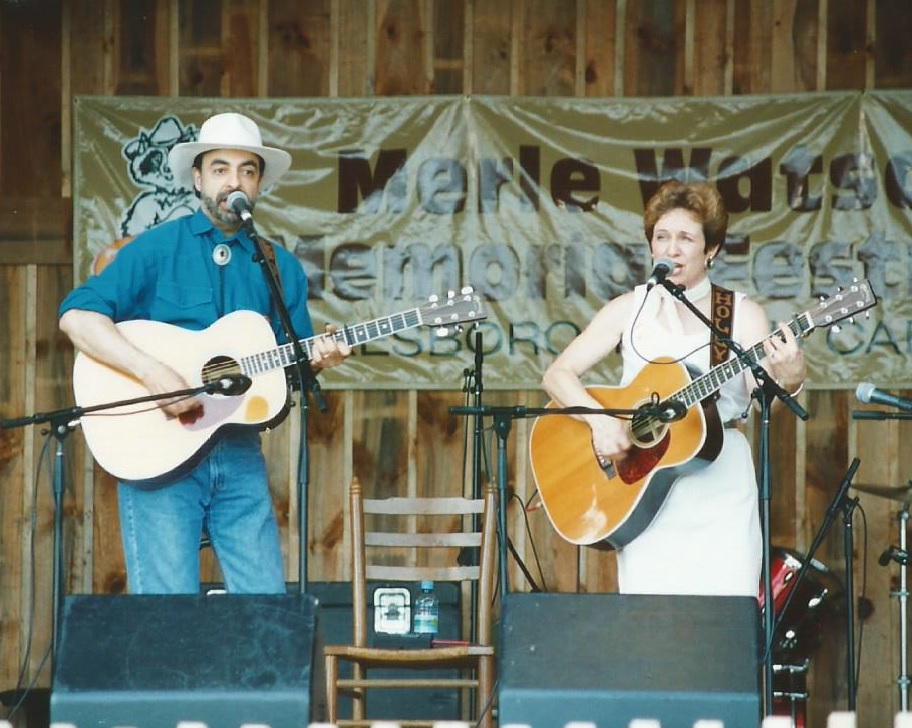
- Barry performing with his partner Holly in 1994

Background information
- Born: August 5, 1945 (age 81); Oak Park, Illinois, U.S.
- Genres: Rock, country
- Instruments: Guitar, vocals
- Years active: 1960s-present
- Member of: The Remains, Barry and Holly Tashian

Barry Tashian (born 5 August 1945) is an American rock and folk musician.

== Career ==
=== The Remains ===
Tashian, together with his fellow students at Boston University, singer/guitarist Barry Tashian, keyboardist Bill Briggs, and bassist Vern Miller, formed the band the Remains, in 1964. The band, in their finest day appeared on The Ed Sullivan Show. They also were one of the opening acts for The Beatles' final U.S. tour in 1966. The group split up in 1966, before returning for a one-off performance at the Boston Tea Party venue. On March A recording of the performance was lost for more than 40 years. Following its discovery, Sundazed Music released Live 1969 on January 12, 2018 featuring nine songs from that night. Of the live recording, Tashian said, "There’s nothing else in the Remains world as wild as this one. We were on fire... on the brink...". Taishan currently performs in the new version of the Remains featuring members Vern Miller and Bill Briggs as of 1998.

=== Barry and Holly Tashian ===
Since 1972, Tashian has been one half of the bluegrass duo Barry and Holly Tashian, alongside his partner Holly. They were awarded the National Association of Independent Record Distributors (NAIRD) award for their album "Straw into Gold" (Country Album of the Year). In 1998 their album, "Harmony" was nominated for Bluegrass Album of the Year by the Nashville Music Awards. As songwriters, Barry and Holly have written for Kenny Rogers, Solomon Burke, Ty England, Daniel O'Donnell, the Nashville Bluegrass Band, Roland White, Kate Brislin and Jody Stecher, Niall Toner, and many others.

== Personal life ==
Barry is of Armenian descent. His paternal grandparents emigrated from Sivas, Armenia and settled in the Chicago area in 1897. His maternal grandparents emigrated from Turkey during the Holocaust and settled in the Chicago area as well. His parents met at the World's Fair in Chicago and eventually moved to Connecticut.

Barry’s son Daniel Tashian is the leader of Nashville pop band The Silver Seas and a Grammy award-winning songwriter.
