= Beacon Street Union =

1960s American rock band

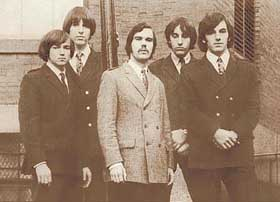

Background information
- Origin: Boston, Massachusetts, United States
- Genres: Psychedelic rock
- Years active: 1966–1969
- Labels: MGM; RTP
- Past members: John Lincoln Wright; Paul Tartachny; Richard Weisberg; Robert Rhodes; Wayne Ulaky

The Beacon Street Union was an American psychedelic rock band in the late 1960s, named for a street in their native Boston, Massachusetts, United States.

The band was composed of Boston College students, singer John Lincoln Wright (September 23, 1947 - December 4, 2011), guitarist/singer Paul Tartachny, bassist/singer Wayne Ulaky, keyboardist Robert Rhodes (born Rosenblatt) and drummer Richard Weisberg. With the exception of a few rock standards, their diverse music was composed by members of the band, primarily Wright and Ulaky.

The band's label, MGM Records promoted them as part of the so-called Bosstown Sound (along with the bands Ultimate Spinach and Orpheus), shepherded by the record producer Alan Lorber. The band met with little nationwide success. Their debut album, The Eyes of the Beacon Street Union, charted at number 75 on May 4, 1968. The band relocated to New York and recorded its second album, The Clown Died in Marvin Gardens. Wright, Ulaky, Weisberg, and Rhodes recorded another album, Come Under Nancy's Tent in 1970 under the band name Eagle for Janus Records. On August 12, 1970, Beacon Street Union opened for Janis Joplin at Harvard Stadium, which was her last public performance before her death. In 1970, The Beacon Street Union recorded their final single "Lord Why Is it So Hard" / "Can't Find My Fingers", adding Charlie Vatalaro on tenor sax.

Wright went on to perform and record as a country artist shortly after, and fronted the Sour Mash Boys. He regularly toured across North America, through to the mid-1990s. He died on December 4, 2011, at age 64, following a series of strokes and a long-time drinking problem. Due to health problems, he stopped performing in 2007. Bandmate and producer Larry Flint admitted by 2007 that Wright "was in pretty bad physical shape, and even his voice was going", with an album recorded that year left unreleased. At the time of his death, he was separated from his wife, who refused to divorce him to ensure that he stayed on her health insurance.

== Discography ==
=== Albums ===
Year	Title	Peak chart positions	
Year	Title	US 200	US CB
1968	The Eyes of the Beacon Street Union	75	89
1968	The Clown Died in Marvin Gardens	173	—
1969	Come Under Nancy's Tent (as Eagle)	—	—

=== Singles ===
- "South End Incident" / "Speed Kills" (1968)
- "Four Hundred and Five" / "Blue Suede Shoes" (1968)
- "May I Light Your Cigarette" / "Mayola" (1968)
- "Lord Why Is It So Hard" / "Can't Find My Fingers" (1970)

== Bibliography ==
Roxon, Lillian (1971). Lillian Roxon's Rock Encyclopedia. Grossett and Dunlap, Universal Library Edition. ISBN 0-448-00255-8.
