= The Remains (band) =

Boston garage rock group

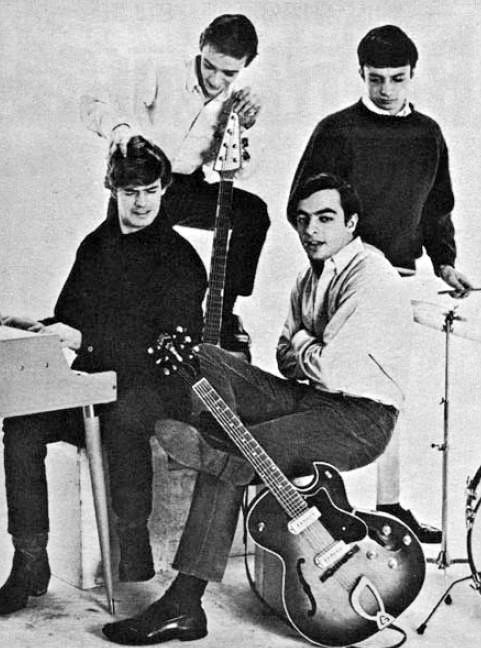
- The Remains in 1966; Clockwise from top-left: Vern Miller, Chip Damiani, Barry Tashian, Bill Briggs

Background information
- Origin: Boston, Massachusetts, U.S.
- Genres: Garage rock; freakbeat
- Years active: 1964–1966, 1969, 1998–present
- Labels: Epic, Rock-A-Lot, Sundazed
- Members: Barry Tashian; Vern Miller
- Past members: Chip Damiani; Bill Briggs; N. D. Smart
- Website: theremains.com

The Remains (sometimes referred to as "Barry and the Remains") are a mid-1960s American garage rock group from Boston, Massachusetts, led by Barry Tashian. Although the Remains never achieved national success, they were very popular in New England, and were one of the opening acts on the Beatles' final US tour in 1966.

The Remains broke up in 1966, but their music eventually attracted a strong international cult following. They began performing and recording again in the late 1990s, and have continued to play regularly since then.

== Career, 1960s ==
The Remains formed in 1964 at Boston University, where all four members were first-year students living in the same dorm in Kenmore Square. Singer-guitarist Barry Tashian and keyboardist Bill Briggs were from Westport, Connecticut, drummer Chip Damiani from Wolcott, Connecticut, and bassist Vern Miller from Livingston, New Jersey. They began playing r&b and rock'n'roll covers, as well as some Tashian originals, at The Rathskeller, a tavern across the square from their dorm. Soon, fans were lining up from Kenmore Square to Fenway Park to see them, and management had to clear out a disused basement to accommodate the crowds.

The band became a popular live act throughout New England and appeared on the CBS TV program The Ed Sullivan Christmas Show of 1965. After signing with Epic Records, they enjoyed local hits with a catchy, swinging Tashian original, "Why Do I Cry", and their hard-driving version of the Bo Diddley/Willie Dixon classic "Diddy Wah Diddy". In 1965, the Remains relocated to New York City—where they appeared on The Ed Sullivan Show—and then, after about a year, moved on to California. They recorded an album, The Remains, appeared on NBC TV's Hullabaloo, and released the soulful, hard-rocking single "Don't Look Back".

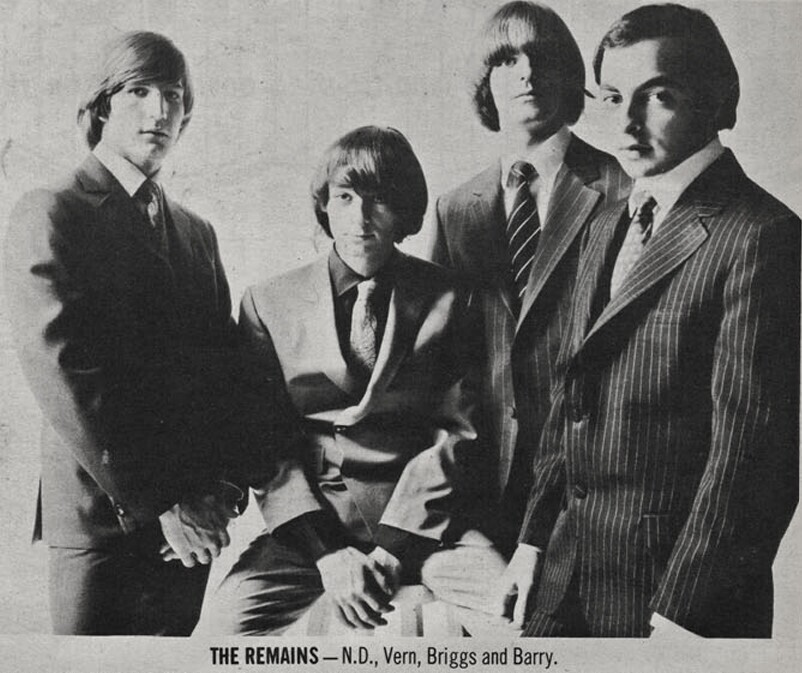
The Remains in late 1966, with N.D. Smart (far left)

In 1966 came the opportunity which might have broken the band nationally, but proved instead to be their last hurrah: they were offered a three-week stint as an opening act for the Beatles, on what would turn out to be the Fab Four's final tour. Immediately before the tour, drummer Chip Damiani quit the band, to be replaced by future Mountain drummer N. D. Smart. Said Tashian in a 2012 interview: "We had always been the four of us and we’d played hundreds and hundreds of gigs as the four of us and all of a sudden this big tour comes up and boom! We have to play it with a new drummer who didn’t have the same feel that Chip had. I mean he was a fine drummer but it wasn’t the same band. I just felt like the flame was burning down without our original drummer."

The band broke up in late 1966, and Epic released their self-titled debut album to little fanfare.

On March 16, 1969, the Remains' original lineup reunited for a one-off performance at the Boston Tea Party. A recording of that live performance was lost for more than 40 years. Following its discovery, Sundazed Music released Live 1969 on January 12, 2018 featuring nine songs from that night, all but one of which were cover tunes. Of the live recording, Tashian said, "There’s nothing else in the Remains world as wild as this one. We were on fire... on the brink..."

== Resurgence ==
In common with many of their garage rock contemporaries, the Remains gradually acquired cult status, and eventually reformed to play at several garage revival shows, such as Cavestomp in New York City in 1998, Las Vegas Grind in 2000 and a tour of major European cities in 2006. They recorded a new album, Movin' On, in 2002.

Although now associated with the garage rock genre, the Remains were accomplished professional musicians and their recordings, while hard-edged, were well-produced and arranged.

The band's last single, "Don't Look Back", written by Billy Vera, was featured on the 1972 compilation album Nuggets: Original Artyfacts From the First Psychedelic Era, which garnered further attention with its 1976 re-release by Sire Records, concurrent with a surge of interest in punk rock and 60s garage rock. A later box set version of the album also includes the Remains' first single, "Why Do I Cry"

"Why Do I Cry" is featured briefly in the film Superbad (2007), when the character McLovin is being taken to a party in a police car.

In 2007, Epic/Legacy reissued the Remains' 1966 album, which was reviewed by rock journalist Mark Kemp in Paste magazine (June 2007): "Had these Boston bad boys stuck it out beyond their 1966 debut, we might today be calling them—and not the Stones—the World's Greatest Rock 'n' Roll Band. As it is, the Remains most certainly are America's greatest lost band."

Kemp's praise echoed the critique written 40 years earlier by rock critic (and subsequent Bruce Springsteen manager) Jon Landau, in Crawdaddy! magazine (January 1967): "They were how you told a stranger about rock'n'roll."

In 2008, a documentary about the Remains, America's Lost Band, directed by Michael Stich, premiered at the Boston Film Festival. Steve Simels of Boxoffice magazine described the film as "a fascinating retelling of one of the great what-might-have-been stories of American music of the '60s."

The Remains' story was the subject of a stage musical at the 2004 New York International Fringe Festival, All Good Things, which received acclaim from a variety of critics. (60sgaragebands.com, News & Nuggets, August 31, 2004).

In 2010, the Remains released "Monbo Time", a tribute to 1960s Boston Red Sox pitcher Bill Monbouquette, with revenue dedicated to cancer research.

On February 23, 2014, Rudolph "Chip" Damiani died of a cerebral haemorrhage.

Bill Briggs died on March 26, 2024.

== Discography ==
Studio albums

- The Remains (1966, Epic)
- Movin' On (2002, Rock-A-Lot)

Other albums

- Live in Boston (1984, Eva 12024) (actually their 1966 Capitol Records New York studio audition with fake audience sounds added, inferior quality)
- A Session with the Remains (1996, Sundazed) (cleaned up 1966 Capitol Records audition)
- Barry and the Remains (1991, Sony; 1964-1966 tracks from The Remains plus additional tracks)
- Live 1969 (2018, Sundazed) (one-off reunion performance at the Boston Tea Party in March 1969)

Singles

- "Why Do I Cry" (1965, Epic) US Cashbox 144
- "I Can't Get Away from You" (1965, Epic)
- "Diddy Wah Diddy" (1966, Epic) US Billboard 129
- "Don't Look Back" (1966, Epic)
- "Monbo Time" (2010)
