= Ultimate Spinach =

American psychedelic rock band (1967–1969)

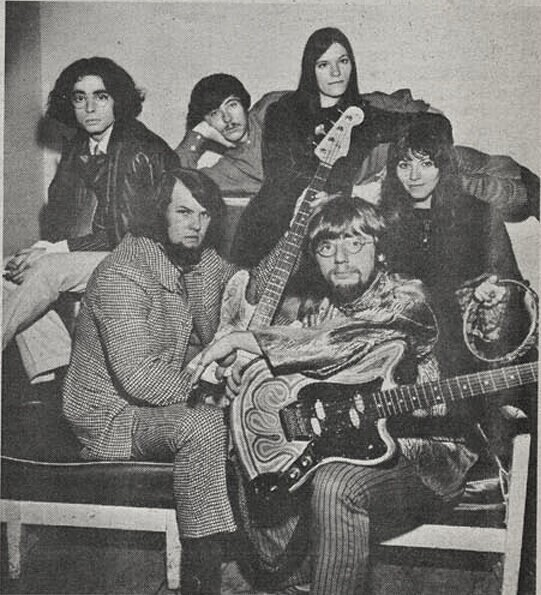
- The band in 1968

Background information
- Origin: Boston, Massachusetts, United States
- Genres: Psychedelic rock; acid rock; blues rock; garage rock; jazz rock
- Years active: 1967–1969
- Label: MGM
- Past members: Ian Bruce-Douglas; Barbara Jean Hudson; Ted Myers; Jeff Baxter; Tony Scheuren; Mike Levine; Russell Levine; Richard Nese; Geoffrey Winthrop; Keith Lahteinen

Ultimate Spinach was a short-lived American psychedelic rock band from Boston, Massachusetts which was formed in 1967. In terms of style and national recognition, the band was one of the most prominent musical acts to emerge from the "Bosstown Sound", which was a marketing campaign posing as a regional attempt to compete with the San Francisco Sound. During the group's existence, they released three albums, with their self-titled debut the most commercially successful.

== History ==
=== "Bosstown Sound" and Naming of Band ===
The band originated as a group called the Underground Cinema, with a line-up consisting of Ian Bruce-Douglas as a multi-instrumentalist, Barbara Hudson as vocalist, Keith Lahteinen on drums, Geoff Winthrop on rhythm guitar, and Richard Nese on bass guitar. As Underground Cinema, the group served as house band in a club called the Unicorn and recorded demos which later appeared on New England Teen Scene: Unreleased! 1965-1968, in 1966.

The name of the band was changed to Ultimate Spinach when they signed with Boston impresario Alan Lorber (Lorber produced all three of their albums). Bruce-Douglas says that he named the band based on experiences in an acid trip: "One day, in 1967, I was in my room, tripping on some really pure LSD. I started looking at myself in the mirror and my face was doing funny things. I had a bunch of colored markers I used to draw with. I grabbed a green one and started drawing all these psychedelic designs on my face. When I was done, I looked at myself and said 'Whoa! I am ultimate spinach. Ultimate spinach is me!'"

There is also a thought that the band name was in accord with other colorful psychedelic band names during that era and got the band attention.

In September 1967, Lorber announced his plan to make Boston, in his own words, "a target city for the development of new artists from one geographical location." Lorber announced his project in a Newsweek magazine article in January 1968, in which he touted new bands which were emblematic of the movement, including Ultimate Spinach, Beacon Street Union and Orpheus. Although the hype of the "Bosstown Sound" anticipated much success, and for a brief period achieved some success, the scene eventually failed to register nationally because the groups were deemed too similar to bands in San Francisco.

=== First album and initial success ===
Douglas was the self-designated leader of the band. He, alone, played several instruments including guitar, keyboards, harmonica, and sang lead for most of the group's songs. In addition to his instrumental responsibilities, Douglas also was the primary songwriter and liner note writer for their first two albums. As the band and its contemporaries were emerging on the scene, the band released their debut album, Ultimate Spinach, on January 6, 1968. The album, like the other bands' debuts, was distributed by MGM Records. A concept album based on anti-war sentiment, the album was Ultimate Spinach's most successful when it peaked at number 34 on the Billboard 200. The album utilized a variety of guitar sounds and distortions including fuzz, echo, tremolo, feedback, volume control, and use of the wah-wah pedal. Each of those aspects were similar to the typical West Coast psychedelic sound of the era. In 2008, the album still retained its presence as a psychedelic classic when it was listed at number 36 on Classic Rock magazine's "42 Greatest Psychedelic Albums". With the publicity backing them, the band toured with prominent musical acts like Big Brother and the Holding Company and The Youngbloods at significant venues like the Fillmore. Following their recording and initial tour, Lahteinen left the group to be replaced by Russell Levine. Priscilla DiDonato was also added to the lineup at this time. The addition enabled the band to more closely recreate the overdubbed vocal harmonies in their debut album.

=== Later work and diminishing returns ===
Later in 1968, the band released their second album, Behold & See, which again was conceived as a concept piece. The album did not chart nearly as well, peaking at number 198. The publicity of the "Bosstown Sound" was quickly fading, as the marketing techniques were viewed unfavorably by critics. Another major weakness in the album was the lack of electric keyboards, a standout feature in their debut, and, without it, the group's complexity in the studio and live was hindered. The mimicking of the west coast sound, once seen as innovative, was then regarded as unappealing. Afterwards, Douglas exited and disbanded the group. Douglas, years later, looked back on the experience saying, "...[Alan Lorber] is totally arrogant in claiming that he has some special insight into how my songs were supposed to sound. How the hell would he know? He never was interested in my vision of these songs. With all the grace and style of a bull in a china shop, he slapped those albums together - both the originals and the reissues - and marketed the hell out of them with no regard for artistic creativity or integrity, just maximum profit: his!" Lorber created an almost completely different lineup of Ultimate Spinach for their final album, which needed to be produced due to contractual obligations. Only Hudson and Levine remained from prior lineups. In 1969, their final album, Ultimate Spinach III, was released, but it failed to chart. After Douglas departed, the band did not have a primary songwriter, so aside from covers the album's songs were all written by three of the new members: guitarist Jeff Baxter, vocalist/guitarist Ted Myers, and keyboardist/vocalist/guitarist Tony Scheuren. The band broke up soon after.

In the 1990s, Big Beat Records reissued all three of the band's albums in the UK. Their material also was featured on compilation albums related to the "Bosstown Sound", and in 2001 The Very Best of Ultimate Spinach was released. After years of bootlegging, a live performance by the band in 1967 at the Unicorn was officially released in 2014 in Europe, entitled Live at the Unicorn, July 1967.

== Members ==
- Ian Bruce-Douglas – lead vocals, electric piano, organ, vibraphone, lead guitar, recorder (1967–1968)
- Barbara Jean Hudson – vocals, acoustic guitar (1967–1969)
- Ted Myers – lead vocals, lead guitar (1967, 1969)
- Jeff Baxter – lead guitar, steel guitar, vibraphone, vocals (1968–1969)
- Tony Scheuren – organ, piano, acoustic guitar, vocals (1968–1969)
- Mike Levine – bass guitar (1968–1969)
- Russell Levine – drums, percussion (1968–1969)
- Richard Nese – bass (acoustic and electric), feedback (1967–1968)
- Geoffrey Winthrop – rhythm guitar (1967–1968)
- Keith Lahteinen – drums, percussion, vocals (1967)

== Discography ==
Studio albums

- Ultimate Spinach (1968)
- Behold & See (1968)
- Ultimate Spinach III (1969)

Compilations

- The Box (2000)
- The Very Best of Ultimate Spinach (2001)
- Sacrifice of the Moon: Instrumental Music of Ultimate Spinach (2006)

Live albums

- Live at the Unicorn, July 1967 (2014)

Singles

- "Ego Trip / Your Head Is Reeling" (1968)
- "(Just Like) Romeo & Juliet" (1969)
