= Boston Tea Party (concert venue) =

Former concert venue in Boston

Coordinates: 42.3464216°N 71.0706964°W

- The May 1969 concert schedule for the venue, displaying acts including Led Zeppelin, the Velvet Underground, and the Who
- Interactive map of Boston Tea Party
- Address: 53 Berkeley Street
- Location: Boston, Massachusetts
- Type: Music venue

Construction
- Opened: 1967
- Closed: 1970

The Boston Tea Party was a concert venue first located at 53 Berkeley Street in the South End neighborhood of Boston. It later moved to 15 Lansdowne Street in the former site of competitor, the Ark, in Boston's Kenmore Square neighborhood, across the street from Fenway Park. It operated from 1967 to the end of 1970. Its closing was due in part to the increasing cost of hiring bands who were playing more and more at large outdoor festivals and arena rock concerts.

The building that the club occupied at 15 Lansdowne Street later reopened multiple times as different clubs before becoming the Avalon in 1992. However, in 2007 Avalon and its neighboring Axis were closed and demolished to make room for a House of Blues, which is what stands on the land today.

The venue became associated with the psychedelic movement, being similar to other contemporary rock halls such as Manhattan, New York's Fillmore East and Electric Circus, San Francisco's Fillmore West, and Philadelphia's Electric Factory.

== History ==
The Boston Tea Party's first home, on Berkeley Street, was constructed in 1872. The large stained-glass Star of David on the front of the building indicates it was built as a synagogue. It is thought it later became a Unitarian meeting house and street mission. Years later it was converted into a venue that showed underground films, before being bought by Ray Riepen and David Hahn and converted again into a concert venue. It opened as a rock music hall on January 20, 1967.

Originally playing host exclusively to local acts, the venue quickly began to attract famous artists, including the Grateful Dead, Chicago, Neil Young, The J. Geils Band, Frank Zappa, Pink Floyd, Cream, Fleetwood Mac, The Allman Brothers Band, Joe Cocker & the Grease Band, Led Zeppelin, The Stooges, Dr. John, Free, The Buddy Miles Express, Charlie Musselwhite, Jeff Beck, The Who, The Byrds, Santana, Taj Mahal, Ten Years After and Sly and the Family Stone. In 1968 the first album rock FM station in Boston, WBCN, began broadcasting out of the back room of the Tea Party and went on to be the highest rated rock station in the market. WBCN was owned by the same owners as the Tea Party. In 1968 Don Law assumed the management of the Tea Party and Law began bringing it major acts from England. The cost of admission at the time ranged between $3.00 and $3.50 per show, although The Who exacted a premium for their performance of Tommy, charging $4.50. For many performances, light shows were designed by Roger Thomas, John Boyd, Deb Colburn, and Ken Brown and run by Lights By The Road. Above the stage, a distinctive arched inscription reading in capital letters "Praise Ye the Lord", remaining from the hall's original use, provided a backdrop.

On New Year's Day 1969, a competing venue called The Ark opened on Lansdowne Street. The Ark's focus was on psychedelic acts; it hosted a famous series of shows by the Grateful Dead on April 21, 22, and 23 of 1969. By the summer, The Ark had closed due to poor management and the Boston Tea Party, which had been looking for a larger venue, took over the space.

=== The Velvet Underground shows ===
Cover art for 1969 recording of the Velvet Underground at the Boston Tea Party

This is our favorite place to play in the whole country.

— Lou Reed, December 14, 1968

The Velvet Underground played regularly to a full house at the Boston Tea Party. According to the club's former manager, Steve Nelson, "People in Boston just adopted them, and that ranges from Harvard graduate students to tough kids from the neighborhood...and that really was the start of their, I guess we could call it a residency." Jonathan Richman, strongly influenced by the Velvet Underground, often came to the Tea Party to hear them play.

The crowd was fun! Wall-to-wall hippies, bikers, Harvard students, Northeastern students, fashion models, professors, drug dealers, art teachers, groupies, MIT students, photographers, local thugs, local disc jockeys, skinny-bohemian-artist girls, visiting dignitaries from the New York art scene, and the royalty of the Boston music set—the local singers and guitar-players in their mod suits strolling around with their beautiful girlfriends.

— Jonathan Richman

An infamous concert featuring the Velvet Underground (as headliners) and the recently signed MC5 took place at the Tea Party in December 1968. The MC5 opened with their high energy performance, playing "Kick Out the Jams" to a room full of Up Against the Wall Motherfuckers anarchists (known primarily as "Motherfuckers"). After the MC5's energized performance, one of the Motherfuckers got on stage and started haranguing the audience and directing them to "burn this place down and take to the streets" After the display of anarchy, Lou Reed addressed the audience, assuring fans that "we have nothing to do with what went on earlier and in fact we consider it very stupid." The Tea Party was the site of a 1969 Velvet Underground show whose bootleg became known as the Guitar Amp Tapes because the microphone was placed inside Lou Reed's amplifier.

In its previous incarnation as a branch of the Filmmakers' Cinémathèque, the Tea Party building itself had a connection to the Velvet Underground: it served as a showcase for underground filmmakers such as Andy Warhol, who managed the band for a time, and Jonas Mekas, a friend who let them rehearse in his loft and filmed their famous performance at the Annual Dinner of the New York Society for Clinical Psychiatry in 1966. The early history of the venue is documented in the book Mansion on the Hill by Fred Goodman.

=== Other performances ===
- The Grateful Dead played six shows there: 10/2/69, 10/3/69, 10/4/69, 12/29/69, 12/30/69, and 12/31/69. The 12/31/69 show was the only time the Grateful Dead performed on New Year's Eve outside of the Bay Area in Northern California.
- Calendar of performances by group and date on The American Revolution documentary film web site.

== See also ==
- Live in Boston (Fleetwood Mac album)
