= Alan Lorber =

American music arranger, record producer, and composer

Alan Lorber is a prolific American music arranger, record producer, and composer. He was especially active in the 1960s and produced a wide variety of music. Among his own recordings is the 1967 album The Lotus Place which features pop covers with Indian influences. He created the "Bosstown Sound" in the late 1960s.

In 2010, Alan Lorber published the book Benny Allen was a Star: a New York Music Story, a work of fiction with autobiographical aspects.

== Production and arrangement ==
The song "Do You Believe in Magic" was produced by Erik Jacobsen and recorded at Bell Sound Studios in New York City in June 1965. In addition to the core members of the Lovin' Spoonful, session musicians contributed to the track, including Jerry Yester on piano and Gary Chester on tambourine.

Vocal arrangement for the track was contributed by arranger and producer Alan Lorber, who played a supporting role in shaping the song's sound. Lorber later noted in an interview, "My recording of 'Do You Believe in Magic' was jug band, made when the Mugwumps split up."

"Can't Find the Time" was written and sung by Bruce Arnold and released in 1968 as the debut single by Orpheus. The song was produced and arranged by Alan Lorber, a key figure in the development of the "Bosstown Sound" movement, which sought to promote Boston-area rock bands. Lorber's orchestration and production were central to the song's lush, melodic sound.

Arnold recalled working closely with Lorber on the track’s harmonic structure. In one interview, he noted that Lorber identified a complex chord in the composition as a "B minor 11th with a double flatted third," underscoring Lorber’s musical expertise.

The original 1962 version of "Breaking Up Is Hard to Do" was co-written by Neil Sedaka and Howard Greenfield. The song featured a catchy Brill Building pop style, with Neil Sedaka on lead vocals.

The arrangement for the song was done by Alan Lorber, whose orchestration contributed to the upbeat and polished sound that helped propel the single to number one on the Billboard Hot 100.

"I Adore Him" was released in 1963 and became a Top 40 hit for The Angels, reaching No. 25 on the Billboard Hot 100 and No. 13 on the R&B chart.

The song was arranged by Alan Lorber, who helped shape its distinct early-'60s pop sound. His orchestration supported the vocal harmonies that characterized The Angels’ style and contributed to the song's commercial success.

In the early 1960s, "Be Anything (but Be Mine)" was recorded by pop singer Connie Francis. This version showcased a more dramatic orchestral style and became a notable entry in her international discography.

The track was produced and arranged by Alan Lorber, whose lush orchestration and pop sensibility helped modernize the song for a 1960s audience.

"Spanish Nights and You" is a romantic ballad recorded by Connie Francis during the early 1960s. The song achieved international success and showcased Francis’s versatility in recording multi-lingual and cross-cultural repertoire.

The track was produced and arranged by Alan Lorber, who provided a richly orchestrated backing that blended traditional pop with subtle Latin influences. His production was instrumental in shaping the sound that appealed to both American and European audiences.

"Baby Workout" was co-written by Jackie Wilson and Alonzo Tucker and released in 1963. The single became one of Wilson's biggest hits, reaching No. 5 on the Billboard Hot 100 and No. 1 on the R&B chart.

The arrangement for the track was done by Alan Lorber, whose dynamic horn-driven orchestration helped define the song’s energetic and danceable sound. Lorber’s contribution played a key role in enhancing the record’s commercial appeal.

"Close to Cathy" was a 1962 pop ballad performed by Mike Clifford. The song reached No. 12 on the Billboard Hot 100 and became Clifford’s most well-known hit.

The song was arranged by Alan Lorber, whose orchestration emphasized lush strings and vocal harmonies, enhancing the emotional impact of the ballad. Lorber’s arrangement was instrumental in shaping the song’s appeal during the early 1960s teen pop era.

"Ciao Baby" was originally recorded in 1967 by the American girl group The Toys, best known for their earlier hit "A Lover's Concerto."

The track was produced by Alan Lorber, whose work brought a richly orchestrated pop-soul style to the recording. Although the original version by The Toys did not chart in the U.S., it served as the foundation for later hit versions by Lynne Randell in Australia and Craig Scott in New Zealand.

"Blue Winter" is a 1964 single recorded by Connie Francis. The song marked a stylistic shift for Francis, blending elements of pop and country, and reached No. 24 on the Billboard Hot 100 chart.

The single was produced and arranged by Alan Lorber, who incorporated Nashville-style instrumentation and a smoother orchestral sound. Lorber’s production played a key role in shaping the song’s crossover appeal.

"I Wake Up Crying" is a 1961 single by American soul singer Chuck Jackson. The song was written by Burt Bacharach and Hal David, and became a modest hit, reaching No. 59 on the Billboard Hot 100 and No. 13 on the R&B chart.

The arrangement was done by Alan Lorber, who brought a sophisticated orchestral touch to the recording. His work supported Jackson’s emotional delivery and helped establish the song as a standout early example of the Bacharach-David catalog.

== Bibliography ==
=== Benny Allen Was a Star: A New York Music Story (2010) ===
A semi-autobiographical novel set in the 1960s New York music scene, following fictional musician Benny Allen. The story explores themes of artistic ambition, the music industry's commercialization, and the psychedelic era.

== Discography ==
=== Albums ===
- The Lotus Place (Verve Records, 1967) – Psychedelic pop/easy listening album featuring Indian-influenced covers

=== Singles ===
- "Like Young" / "Theme from The Dark at the Top of the Stairs" (MGM Records, 1960) – As "Alan Lorber and His Orchestra"
- "The Lotus Place" / "Along Comes Mary" (ABC Records, 1967) – Promotional single

=== Production and arrangement credits ===
- The Free Design – Arranger/producer on Kites Are Fun (1967)
- The Left Banke – Baroque-pop arrangements (1966–1968)
- The Cowsills – Early production work (pre-"Hair")
- Boston Sound compilations – Produced tracks for Ultimate Spinach, Beacon Street Union, and Orpheus (1967–1969)
