= First Sessions =

EP by Norah Jones
- Released: May 30, 2001
- Recorded: October 8–9, 2000
- Length: 19:17
- Label: Blue Note Records

Norah Jones chronology
First Sessions (2001)	Come Away with Me (2002)

Professional ratings
Review scores
Source	Rating
AllMusic	3/5 stars

"Don't Know Why"
Norah Jones's "Don't Know Why" from Come Away with Me, derived from the recording on First Sessions.

First Sessions is an EP by singer Norah Jones, released on May 30, 2001. The EP was a limited release of approximately 10,000 copies which were available on Jones' website and at live shows.

== Background ==
As the name suggests, First Sessions marked the first recordings released by Jones after being signed with Blue Note Records. Label A&R Brian Bacchus tasked Jones with experienced engineer Jay Newland to record demos of around nine songs in October 2000. Six of these were chosen for the sampler release First Sessions, while the remainder were set aside for consideration for her debut album Come Away with Me. Ultimately, most of the songs featured here ended up on Come Away with Me, with slight modifications and additions under the direction of producer Arif Mardin, with the unaltered versions included on the 20th anniversary edition re-issue of Come Away With Me, released in 2022.

== Track listing ==
No.	Title	Writer(s)	Length
1.	"Don't Know Why"	Jesse Harris	3:11
2.	"Come Away with Me"	Norah Jones	3:06
3.	"Something Is Calling You"	Jesse Harris	3:25
4.	"Turn Me On"	John D. Loudermilk	2:37
5.	"Lonestar"	Lee Alexander	3:07
6.	"Peace"	Horace Silver	3:51

== Personnel ==
- Norah Jones - piano, vocals
- Lee Alexander - bass
- Jesse Harris - guitar
- Olivier Vieser - guitar
- Dan Rieser - drums
- Adam Rogers - guitar (track 4)
- Tony Scherr - acoustic and slide guitar (track 5)

== Production ==
- Recording engineer and mix: Jay Newland
