= Ord, Nebraska =

- City
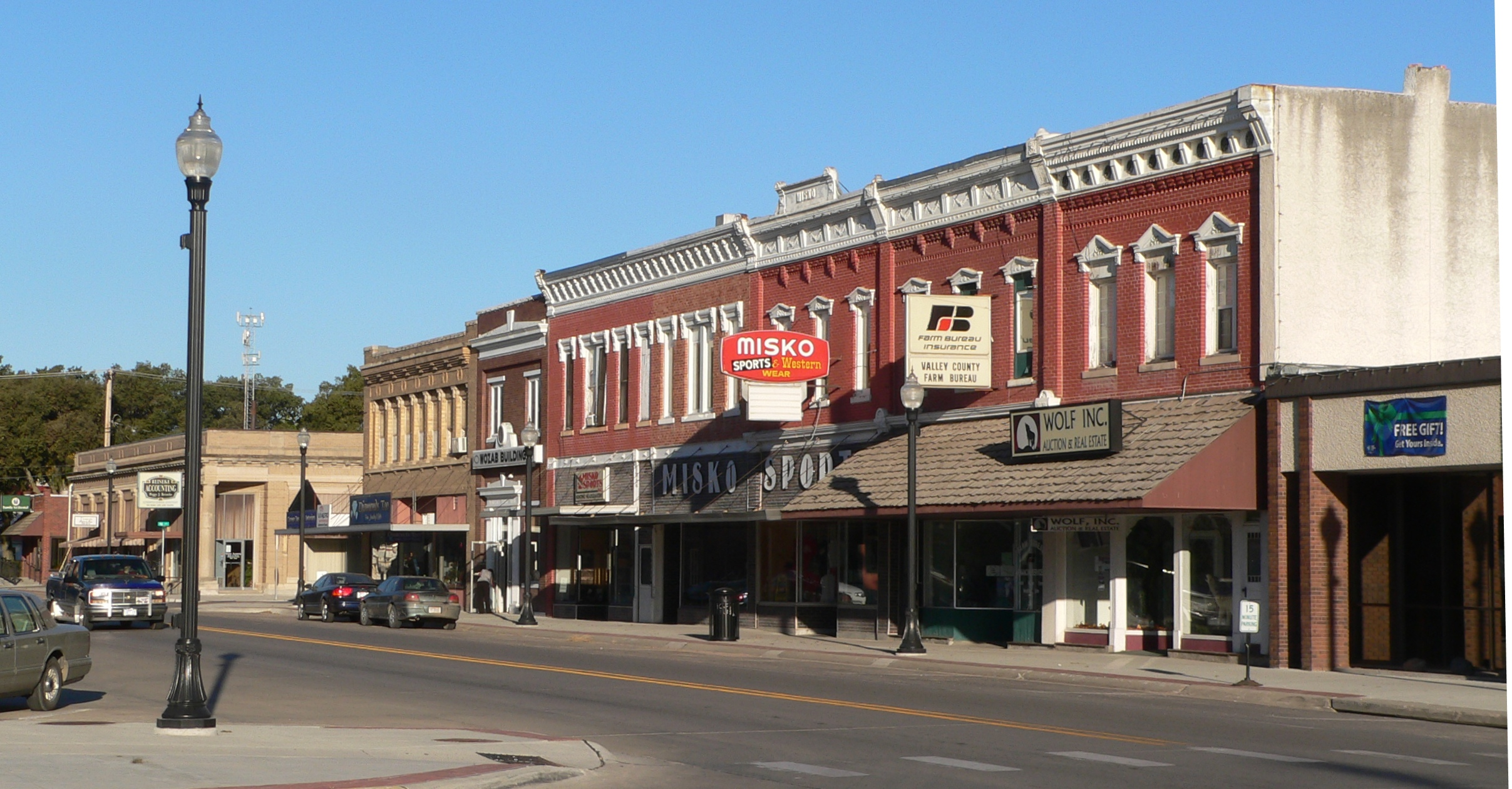
- Downtown Ord: L Street

- Location of Ord, Nebraska
- Coordinates: 41°35′57″N 98°55′00″W
- Country: United States
- State: Nebraska
- County: Valley

Area
  - Total: 2.10 sq mi (5.44 km^{2})
  - Land: 2.10 sq mi (5.44 km^{2})
  - Water: 0 sq mi (0.00 km^{2})
- Elevation: 2,041 ft (622 m)

Population (2020)
  - Total: 2,113
  - Density: 1,005.7/sq mi (388.31/km^{2})
- Time zone: UTC-6 (Central (CST))
  - Summer (DST): UTC-5 (CDT)
- ZIP code: 68862
- Area code: 308
- FIPS code: 31-37280
- GNIS feature ID: 2396074
- Website: ordnebraska.com

Ord is a city in Valley County, Nebraska, United States. As of the 2020 census, Ord had a population of 2,113. It is the county seat of Valley County.

== History ==
Ord was platted in 1874. It is named in honor of Civil War general Edward O. C. Ord. Under the Union Pacific Railroad, the Omaha and Republican Valley Railway established the 59-mile (95 km) Ord Subdivision between Grand Island and Ord in 1886. Today, the subdivision is serviced by the Nebraska Central Railroad, a subsidiary of the Rio Grande Pacific Corporation. The railway currently connects to Union Pacific's nationwide rail system and serves as a means of transportation for the agricultural produce of the Valley County area.

== Geography ==
According to the United States Census Bureau, the city has a total area of 1.94 square miles (5.02 km^{2}), all of it land.

== Demographics ==
Historical population
Census	Pop.	Note	%±
1880	181		—
1890	1,208		567.4%
1900	1,372		13.6%
1910	1,960		42.9%
1920	2,143		9.3%
1930	2,226		3.9%
1940	2,240		0.6%
1950	2,239		0.0%
1960	2,413		7.8%
1970	2,439		1.1%
1980	2,658		9.0%
1990	2,481		−6.7%
2000	2,269		−8.5%
2010	2,112		−6.9%
2020	2,113		0.0%
U.S. Decennial Census; 2013 Estimate

=== 2020 census ===
As of the 2020 census, Ord had a population of 2,113. The median age was 44.1 years. 23.1% of residents were under the age of 18 and 25.7% of residents were 65 years of age or older. For every 100 females there were 93.1 males, and for every 100 females age 18 and over there were 93.5 males age 18 and over.

0.0% of residents lived in urban areas, while 100.0% lived in rural areas.

There were 970 households in Ord, of which 23.3% had children under the age of 18 living in them. Of all households, 44.6% were married-couple households, 22.0% were households with a male householder and no spouse or partner present, and 27.7% were households with a female householder and no spouse or partner present. About 40.5% of all households were made up of individuals and 20.7% had someone living alone who was 65 years of age or older.

There were 1,138 housing units, of which 14.8% were vacant. The homeowner vacancy rate was 4.7% and the rental vacancy rate was 13.9%.

Racial composition as of the 2020 census
Race	Number	Percent
White	1,986	94.0%
Black or African American	14	0.7%
American Indian and Alaska Native	9	0.4%
Asian	9	0.4%
Native Hawaiian and Other Pacific Islander	7	0.3%
Some other race	32	1.5%
Two or more races	56	2.7%
Hispanic or Latino (of any race)	83	3.9%

=== 2010 census ===
As of the census of 2010, there were 2,112 people, 988 households, and 565 families living in the city. The population density was 1,088.7 inhabitants per square mile (420.3/km^{2}). There were 1,122 housing units at an average density of 578.4 per square mile (223.3/km^{2}). The racial makeup of the city was 96.4% White, 0.3% African American, 0.2% Native American, 0.1% Asian, 2.1% from other races, and 0.9% from two or more races. Hispanic or Latino of any race were 2.8% of the population.

There were 988 households, of which 24.3% had children under the age of 18 living with them, 48.2% were married couples living together, 6.3% had a female householder with no husband present, 2.7% had a male householder with no wife present, and 42.8% were non-families. 39.6% of all households were made up of individuals, and 18.9% had someone living alone who was 65 years of age or older. The average household size was 2.09 and the average family size was 2.78.

The median age in the city was 47.2 years. 20.7% of residents were under the age of 18; 5.9% were between the ages of 18 and 24; 20.9% were from 25 to 44; 27.3% were from 45 to 64; and 25.1% were 65 years of age or older. The gender makeup of the city was 47.7% male and 52.3% female.

=== 2000 census ===
As of the census of 2000, there were 2,269 people, 1,006 households, and 611 families living in the city. The population density was 1,366.3 inhabitants per square mile (527.5/km^{2}). There were 1,149 housing units at an average density of 691.9 per square mile (267.1/km^{2}). The racial makeup of the city was 97.71% White, 0.22% African American, 0.48% Native American, 0.18% Asian, 0.13% Pacific Islander, 0.79% from other races, and 0.48% from two or more races. Hispanic or Latino of any race were 2.25% of the population.

There were 1,006 households, out of which 26.3% had children under the age of 18 living with them, 50.9% were married couples living together, 7.8% had a female householder with no husband present, and 39.2% were non-families. 36.0% of all households were made up of individuals, and 21.1% had someone living alone who was 65 years of age or older. The average household size was 2.17 and the average family size was 2.84.

In the city, the population was spread out, with 22.6% under the age of 18, 5.2% from 18 to 24, 20.5% from 25 to 44, 24.4% from 45 to 64, and 27.4% who were 65 years of age or older. The median age was 46 years. For every 100 females, there were 82.8 males. For every 100 females age 18 and over, there were 79.8 males.

As of 2000 the median income for a household in the city was $27,364, and the median income for a family was $36,383. Males had a median income of $26,412 versus $16,895 for females. The per capita income for the city was $15,337. About 6.8% of families and 10.3% of the population were below the poverty line, including 15.2% of those under age 18 and 12.2% of those age 65 or over.

== Community development ==
The people of Ord have implemented a number of community improvement initiatives over the course of the last few decades in response to population loss. Since 2000, the city has seen the investment of over $125 million in both private and public dollars. During that time, Ord and Valley County have seen the creation of over 100 new businesses, 350 new jobs, and employment levels returning to pre-recession levels. The community is focused on selling the lifestyle of small-town living while offering the amenities necessary for entrepreneurs to thrive. This effort has seen the population actually grow between 2010 and 2018. In 2019, Scratchtown Brewing Company received a Rural Energy for America Program (REAP) grant for a 24-kilowatt rooftop photovoltaic system. Ord continues to work hard to attract new talent while retaining the current population, and has been recognized in publications such as the New York Times, Wall Street Journal, and NPR.

== Notable people ==
- Rod Dowhower - former coach of the Indianapolis Colts and the Stanford Cardinal football team.
- Clyde E. Elliott - motion picture producer and director
- Darrell Johnson - former Major League Baseball player and manager
- Mike McCready (music entrepreneur) - Co-founder Platinum Blue Music Intelligence
- Evelyn Sharp - American aviator
