= Live in New Orleans (Norah Jones video album) =

Video by Norah Jones
- Released: February 25, 2003
- Recorded: August 24, 2002
- Venues: House of Blues, New Orleans
- Genre: Jazz
- Length: 67 minutes
- Label: Blue Note
- Directors: Jim Gabour; James Frost (music video)
- Producer: Jim Gabour

Norah Jones chronology
Come Away with Me (2002)	Live in New Orleans (2003)	New York City (2003)

Norah Jones video chronology
Live in New Orleans (2003)	Live in 2004 (2004)

Live in New Orleans is the first DVD release by American jazz singer Norah Jones. The DVD release features Jones's concert at House of Blues, New Orleans as part of her Come Away with Me Tour, includes ten songs from her debut album Come Away with Me as well as the covers "Comes Love" and "Bessie Smith". The DVD was released by Blue Note Records on February 25, 2003.

The DVD is also released as a bonus disc for the deluxe edition of Come Away with Me.

== Track listing ==
No.	Title	Writer(s)	Length
1.	"Cold, Cold Heart"	Hank Williams	4:44
2.	"Nightingale"	Norah Jones	4:00
3.	"One Flight Down"	Jesse Harris	2:44
4.	"Seven Years"	Lee Alexander	3:02
5.	"Feelin' the Same Way"	Alexander	4:16
6.	"Comes Love"	Lew Brown, Sam H. Stept, Charles Tobias	4:38
7.	"Something Is Calling You"	Harris	3:02
8.	"Come Away with Me"	Jones	3:35
9.	"What Am I to You?"	Jones	3:24
10.	"Painter Song"	Alexander, J. C. Hopkins	2:24
11.	"Lonestar"	Alexander	3:10
12.	"I've Got to See You Again"	Harris	5:40
13.	"Bessie Smith"	Rick Danko, Robbie Robertson	3:29
14.	"Don't Know Why"	Harris	3:37

Encore
No.	Title	Length
15.	"Tennessee Waltz"	5:40

Bonus feature
No.	Title	Length
16.	"Come Away With Me" (music video)	3:15

== Personnel ==
Performers

- Norah Jones – vocals, acoustic and electric piano
- Lee Alexander – bass
- Andrew Borger – drums
- Adam Levy – guitar, backing vocals
- Daru – backing vocals (on track 11)

Technical

- Jim Gabour – director, producer
- Tom Roche – Film editing
- Greg Crawford – mixing

== Charts ==
Chart (2003)	Peak position
Australian Music DVD (ARIA)	1
Austrian Music DVD (Ö3 Austria)	1
Dutch Music DVD (MegaCharts)	5
Swedish Music DVD (Sverigetopplistan)	1
UK Music Videos (Official Charts)	3
US Music Videos (Billboard)	1

== Certifications ==
Region	Certification	Certified units/sales
Argentina (CAPIF)	Platinum	8,000^{^}
Australia (ARIA)	2× Platinum	30,000^{^}
Brazil (Pro-Música Brasil)	Gold	25,000^{*}
Canada (Music Canada)	3× Platinum	30,000^{^}
France (SNEP)	2× Platinum	40,000^{*}
Germany (BVMI)	Gold	25,000^{^}
Netherlands (NVPI)	Gold	40,000^{^}
United Kingdom (BPI)	Gold	25,000^{^}
United States (RIAA)	2× Platinum	200,000^{^}
^{*} Sales figures based on certification alone.^{^} Shipments figures based on certification alone.
