= Live in New Orleans =

Live in New Orleans may refer to:

- 311 Day: Live in New Orleans DVD
- Live in New Orleans (Maze album)
- Live in New Orleans (Norah Jones video album)
- Live in New Orleans, CD by Spencer Bohren 2007
- Live in New Orleans, CD by Liza Minnelli 2011
- Live In New Orleans, Liza Minnelli video album 2011
- Live in New Orleans, by Neville Brothers
