= Tribeca =

Neighborhood of Manhattan in New York City

- Neighborhood of Manhattan
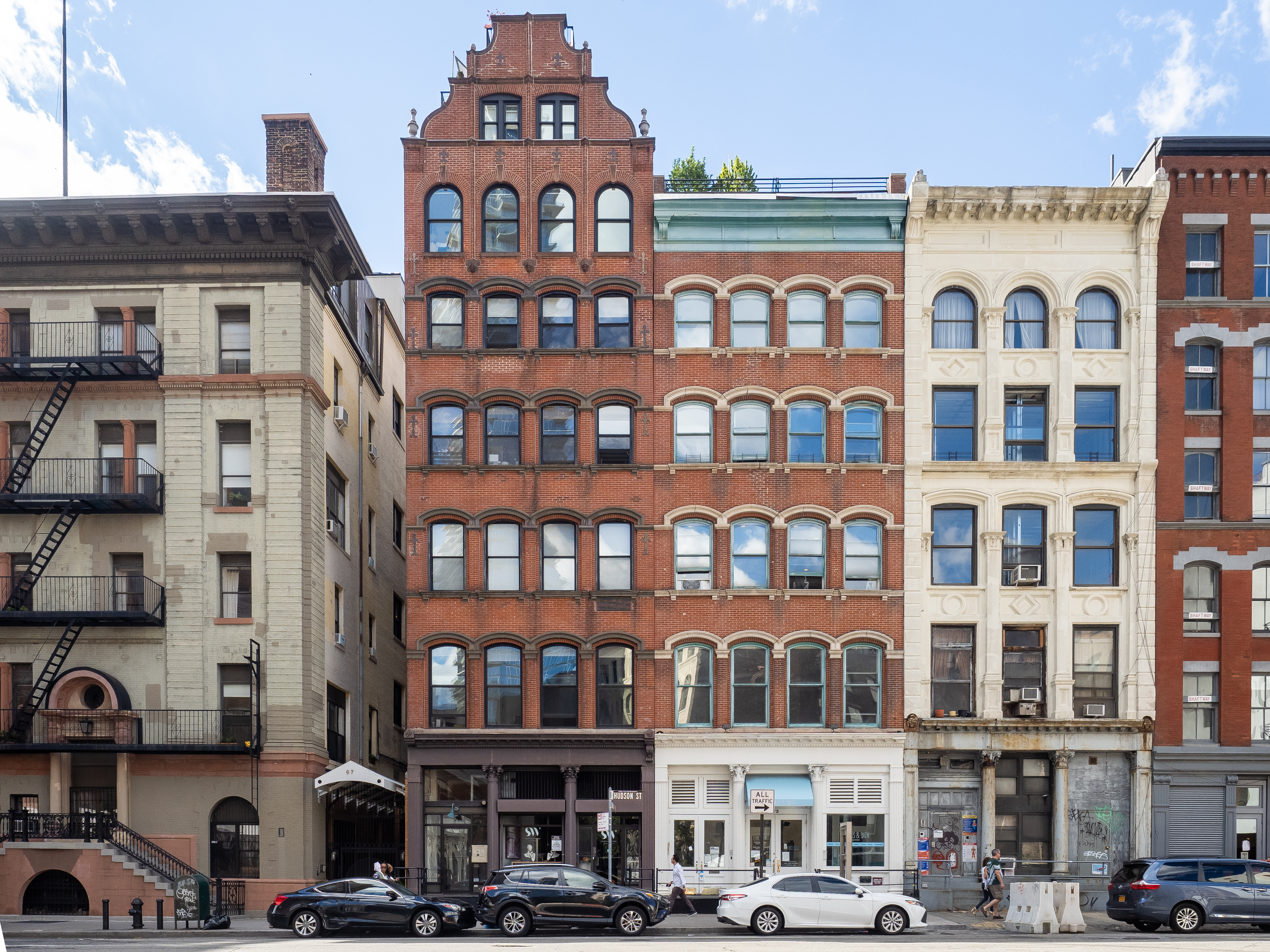
- Hudson Street in Tribeca
- Location in New York City, using extended southern border introduced by realtors in 21st century
- Coordinates: 40.718°N 74.008°W
- Country: United States
- State: New York
- City: New York City
- Borough: Manhattan
- Community District: Manhattan 1

Area
  - Total: 0.35 sq mi (0.91 km^{2})

Population (2020)
  - Total: 21,305
  - Density: 61,000/sq mi (24,000/km^{2})

Economics
  - Median income: $196,692
- ZIP Codes: 10007, 10013
- Area codes: 212, 332, 646, and 917

Tribeca (/traɪˈbɛkə/ try-BEK-ə), originally written as TriBeCa, is a neighborhood in Lower Manhattan in New York City. Its name is a syllabic abbreviation of "Triangle Below Canal". The "triangle" (more accurately a quadrilateral) is bounded by Canal Street, West Street, Broadway, and Chambers Street. By the 2010s, a common marketing tactic was to extend Tribeca's southern boundary to either Vesey (Note: Despite it being an artificial marketing ploy introduced by realtors, its common use has led Google Maps – as of January 2025 – to show Vesey Street as the southern border of Tribeca. The Wikimedia map included in this article's infobox also uses Vesey Street as the southern border.) or Murray Streets to increase the appeal of property listings.

The neighborhood began as farmland, then was a residential neighborhood in the early 19th century, before becoming a mercantile area centered on produce, dry goods, and textiles, and then transitioning to artists and then actors, models, entrepreneurs, and other celebrities. The neighborhood is home to the Tribeca Festival, which was created in response to the September 11 attacks, to reinvigorate the neighborhood and downtown after the destruction caused by the terrorist attacks.

Tribeca is part of Manhattan Community District 1, and its primary ZIP Codes are 10007 and 10013. It is patrolled by the 1st Precinct of the New York City Police Department.

== Name ==
Tribeca is one of a number of neighborhoods in New York City whose names are syllabic abbreviations or acronyms, including SoHo (South of Houston Street), NoHo (North of Houston Street), Nolita (North of Little Italy), NoMad (North of Madison Square), DUMBO (Down Under the Manhattan Bridge Overpass), and BoCoCa, the last of which is actually a collection of neighborhoods (Boerum Hill, Cobble Hill, and Carroll Gardens).

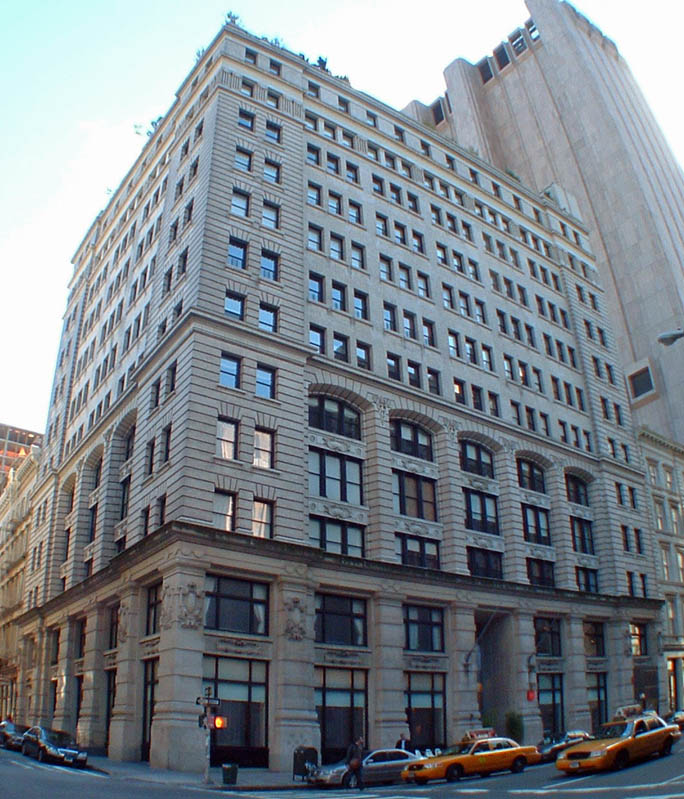
Textile Building (1901) in the Tribeca Historic District

The name "Tribeca" was coined in the early 1970s and originally applied to the narrower area bounded by Broadway and Canal, Lispenard, and Church Streets, which appears to be a triangle on city planning maps. Residents of this area formed the TriBeCa Artists' Co-op in filing legal documents connected to a 1973 zoning dispute. An April 1976 article in The New York Times described that residents had used such names as "Lo Cal" and "So So" for the neighborhood, and that the City Planning Commission had established the name and that it covered "Canal Street on the north, Barclay Street on the south, West Street, and Broadway on the east". According to a local historian, the name had been misconstrued by the newspaper reporter as applying to a much larger area, which is how it came to be the name of the current neighborhood.

== History ==
=== Early history ===
The area now known as Tribeca was farmed by Dutch settlers to New Amsterdam, prominently Roeleff Jansen (who obtained the land patent, called Dominie's Bouwery, from Wouter van Twiller in 1636) and his wife Anneke Jans who later married Everardus Bogardus. The land stayed with the family until 1670 when the deed was signed over to Col. Francis Lovelace. In 1674 the Dutch took possession of the area until the English reclaimed the land a year later. In 1674, representing the Duke of York, Governor Andros took possession of the land.

Tribeca was later part of the large tract of land given to Trinity Church by Queen Anne in 1705. In 1807, the church built St. John's Chapel on Varick Street and then laid out St. John's Park, bounded by Laight Street, Varick Street, Ericsson Place, and Hudson Street. The church also built Hudson Square, a development of brick houses that surrounded the park, which would become the model for Gramercy Park. The area was among the first residential neighborhoods developed in New York City beyond the city's colonial boundaries, and remained primarily residential until the 1840s.

Several streets in the area are named after Anthony Lispenard Bleecker and the Lispenard family. Beach Street was created in the late 18th century and was the first street on or adjacent to the farm of Anthony Lispenard Bleecker, which was just south of what is now Canal Street; the name of the street is a corruption of the name of Paul Bache, a son-in-law of Anthony Lispenard. Lispenard Street in Tribeca is named for the Lispenard family, and Bleecker Street in NoHo was named for Anthony Lispenard Bleecker.

=== Commercial and industrial development ===
During the 1840s and then continuing after the American Civil War, shipping in New York City – which then consisted only of Manhattan – shifted in large part from the East River and the area around South Street to the Hudson River, where the longer piers could more easily handle the larger ships which were then coming into use. In addition, the dredging of the sand bars which lay across the entrance to New York Harbor from the Atlantic Ocean made it easier for ships to navigate to the piers on the Hudson, rather than use the "back door" via the East River to the piers there. Later, the Hudson River piers also received freight via railroad cars ferried across the river from New Jersey.

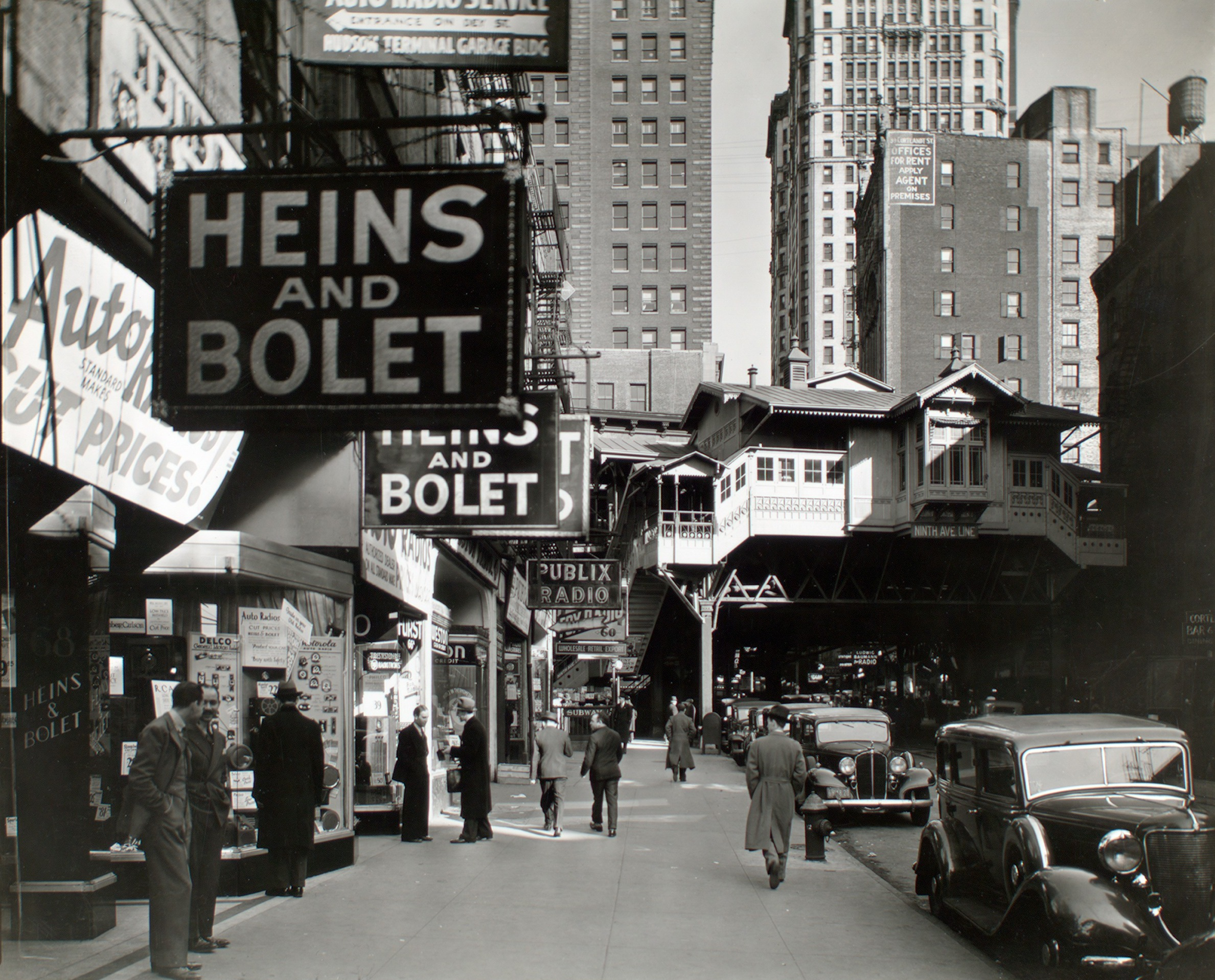
"Radio Row", seen here in 1934, was displaced by the building of the World Trade Center. (Photo by Berenice Abbott)

The increased shipping encouraged the expansion of the Washington Market – a wholesale produce market that opened in 1813 as "Bear Market" – from the original market buildings to buildings throughout its neighborhood, taking over houses and warehouses to use for the storage of produce, including butter, cheese, and eggs. In the mid-19th century, the neighborhood was the center of the dry goods and textile industries in the city, and St. John's Park was turned into a freight depot. Later, the area also featured fireworks outlets, pets stores, radios – which were clustered in a district that was displaced by the building of the World Trade Center – sporting goods, shoes, and church supplies. By the mid-19th century, the area transformed into a commercial center, with large numbers of store and loft buildings constructed along Broadway in the 1850s and 1860s.

Development in the area was further spurred by New York City Subway construction, namely the extension of the IRT Broadway – Seventh Avenue Line (today's 1, 2, and 3 trains), which opened for service in 1918, and the accompanying extension of Seventh Avenue and the widening of Varick Street during subway construction in 1914, both of resulted in better access to the area for vehicles and for subway riders. The area was also served by the IRT Ninth Avenue Line, an elevated train line on Greenwich Street demolished in 1940.

After the construction of the Holland Tunnel from 1920 to 1927 and the transition of freight shipping from ships and railroads to trucks, the truck traffic generated by the market and other businesses caused considerable congestion in the area. This provoked the building between 1929 and 1951 of the Miller Highway, an elevated roadway that came to be called the West Side Highway, the purpose of which was to handle through automobile traffic, which thus did not have to deal with the truck congestion at street level. Because of a policy of "deferred maintenance", the elevated structure began to fall apart in the late 1960s and early 1970s, and the highway was shut down in 1973. The roadway project planned to replace it, called Westway, was fought by neighborhood activists, and was eventually killed by environmental concerns. Instead, West Street was rebuilt to handle through traffic.

=== Redevelopment ===
By the 1960s, Tribeca's industrial base had all but vanished, and the produce market moved to Hunts Point in the Bronx in the 1960s. The city put an urban renewal plan into effect, which involved the demolition of many old buildings, with the intent of building high-rise residential towers, office buildings, and schools. Some of these were constructed, including Independence Plaza in 1975 on Washington Street, the Borough of Manhattan Community College in 1980, and Washington Market Park in 1981. Some warehouse buildings were converted to residential use, and lofts began to be utilized by artists, who lived and worked in their spaces, a model which had been pioneered in nearby SoHo. In the early 1970s, a couple of years after artists in SoHo were able to legalize their live/work situation, artist and resident organizations in the area to the south, then known as Washington Market or the Lower West Side, sought to gain similar zoning status for their neighborhood. One of the neighborhood groups called themselves the "Triangle Below Canal Block Association", and, as activists had done in SoHo, shortened the group's name to the Tribeca Block Association. The Tribeca name came to be applied to the area south of Canal Street, between Broadway and West Street, extending south to – as variously defined – Chambers, Vesey, or Murray Street.

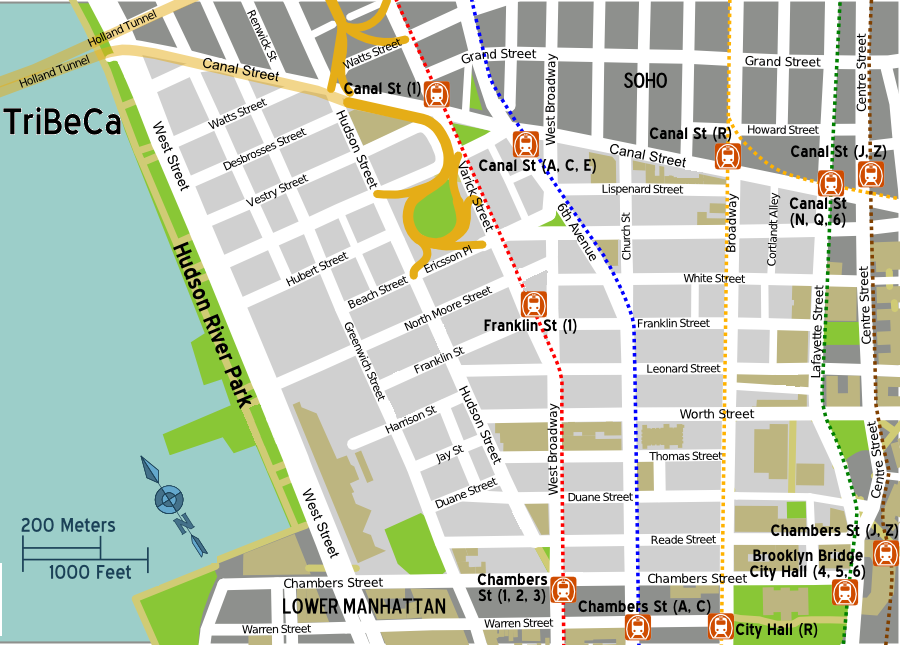
Map of Tribeca (excluding the portion south of Chambers Street) and major parks and transit connections.

In 1996, the Tribeca Open Artist Studio Tour was founded as a non-profit, artist-run organization with the mission to empower the working artists of Tribeca while providing an educational opportunity for the public. For 15 years, the annual free walking tour through artist studios in Tribeca has allowed people to get a unique glimpse into the lives of Tribeca's best creative talent. Tribeca suffered both physically and financially after the September 11, 2001 terrorist attacks, but government grants and incentives helped the area rebound fairly quickly. The Tribeca Film Festival was established to help contribute to the long-term recovery of lower Manhattan after 9/11. The festival also celebrates New York City as a major filmmaking center. The mission of the film festival is "to enable the international film community and the general public to experience the power of film by redefining the film festival experience." Tribeca is a popular filming location for movies and television shows.

By the early 21st century, Tribeca became one of Manhattan's most fashionable and desirable neighborhoods, well known for its celebrity residents. Its streets teem with art galleries, boutique shops, restaurants, and bars. In 2006, Forbes magazine ranked its 10013 zip code as New York City's most expensive (however, the adjacent, low-income neighborhood of Chinatown, also uses the 10013 zip code). As of 2010, Tribeca was the safest neighborhood in New York City, according to NYPD and CompStat statistics. In the 2010s, several skyscrapers were completed, including 30 Park Place (containing the Four Seasons Hotel New York Downtown), 56 Leonard Street, and 111 Murray Street.

Historical population
Census	Pop.	Note	%±
1950	782		—
1960	382		−51.2%
1970	370		−3.1%
1980	5,949		1,507.8%
1990	8,386		41.0%
2000	10,395		24.0%
2010	17,056		64.1%

== Demographics ==
For census purposes, the New York City government classifies Tribeca as part of a larger neighborhood tabulation area called SoHo-TriBeCa-Civic Center-Little Italy. Based on data from the 2010 United States census, the population of SoHo-TriBeCa-Civic Center-Little Italy was 42,742, a change of 5,985 (14%) from the 36,757 counted in 2000. Covering an area of 581.62 acres (235.37 ha), the neighborhood had a population density of 73.5 inhabitants per acre (47,000/sq mi; 18,200/km^{2}). The racial makeup of the neighborhood was 66.1% (28,250) White, 2.2% (934) African American, 0.1% (30) Native American, 22.2% (9,478) Asian, 0% (11) Pacific Islander, 0.4% (171) from other races, and 2.6% (1,098) from two or more races. Hispanic or Latino of any race were 6.5% (2,770) of the population.

The entirety of Community District 1, which comprises Tribeca and other Lower Manhattan neighborhoods, had 63,383 inhabitants as of NYC Health's 2018 Community Health Profile, with an average life expectancy of 85.8 years. This is higher than the median life expectancy of 81.2 for all New York City neighborhoods. Most inhabitants are young to middle-aged adults: half (50%) are between the ages of 25–44, while 14% are between 0–17, and 18% between 45 and 64. The ratio of college-aged and elderly residents was lower, at 11% and 7%, respectively.

As of 2017, the median household income in Community Districts 1 and 2 was $144,878. In 2018, an estimated 9% of Tribeca and Lower Manhattan residents lived in poverty, compared to 14% in all of Manhattan and 20% in all of New York City. One in twenty-five residents (4%) were unemployed, compared to 7% in Manhattan and 9% in New York City. Rent burden, or the percentage of residents who have difficulty paying their rent, is 38% in Tribeca and Lower Manhattan, compared to the boroughwide and citywide rates of 45% and 51%, respectively. Based on this calculation, as of 2018, Tribeca and Lower Manhattan are considered high-income relative to the rest of the city and not gentrifying.

== Places ==
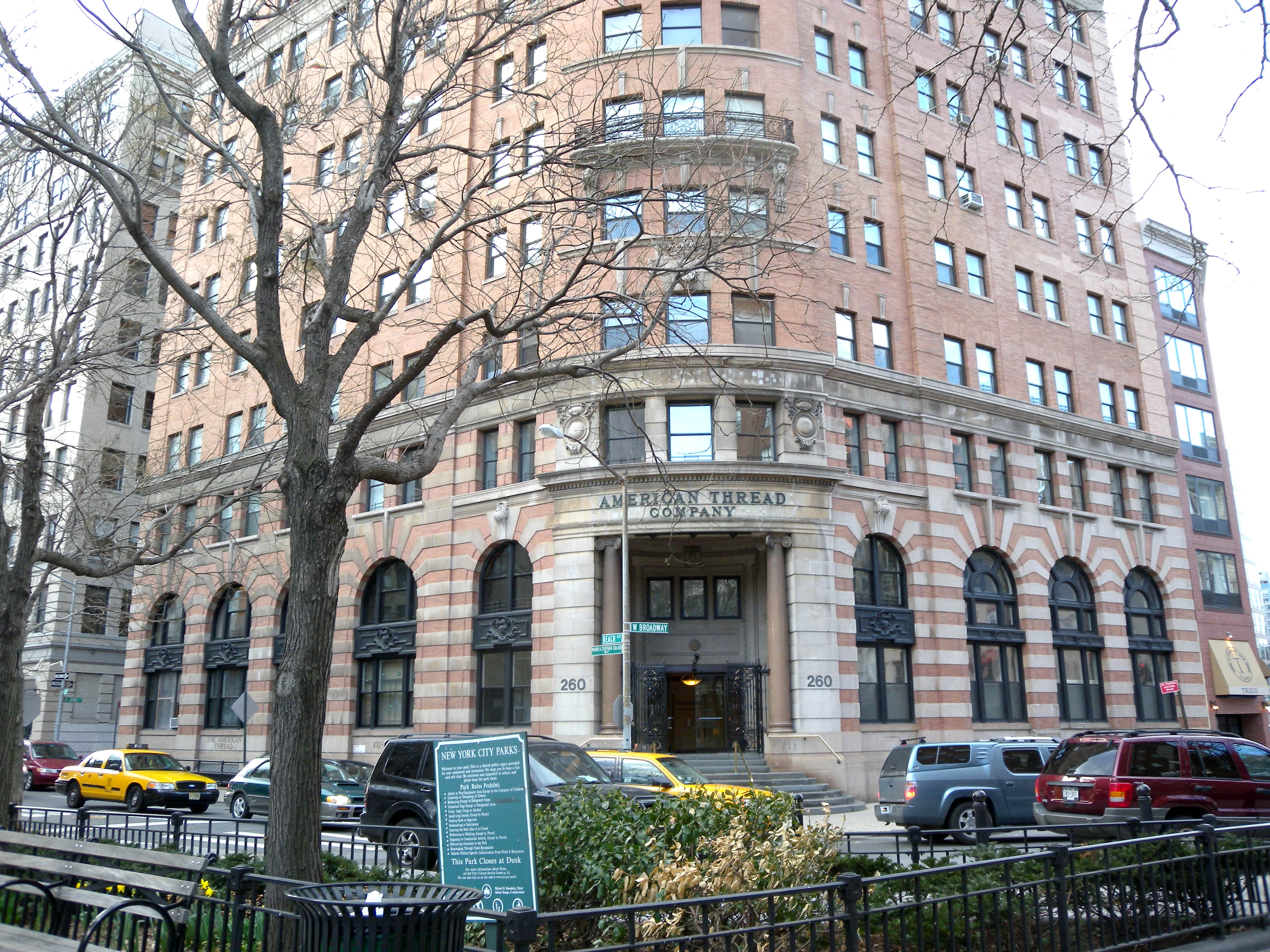
American Thread Building

Tribeca is dominated by former industrial buildings that have been converted into residential buildings and lofts, similar to those of the neighboring SoHo-Cast Iron Historic District. In the 19th and early 20th centuries, the neighborhood was a center of the textile/cotton trade.

Notable buildings in the neighborhoods include the historic neo-Renaissance Textile Building, designed by Henry J. Hardenbergh and built in 1901, and the Powell Building, a designated Landmark on Hudson Street, which was designed by Carrère and Hastings and built in 1892. Other notable buildings include the New York Telephone Company building at 140 West Street, between Vesey and Barclay, with its Mayan-inspired Art Deco motif, and the former New York Mercantile Exchange at 6 Harrison Street.

During the late 1960s and 1970s, abandoned and inexpensive Tribeca lofts became hot-spot residences for young artists and their families because of the seclusion of lower Manhattan and the vast living space. Jim Stratton, a Tribeca resident since this period, wrote the 1977 nonfiction book entitled Pioneering in the Urban Wilderness, detailing his experiences renovating lower Manhattan warehouses into residences.

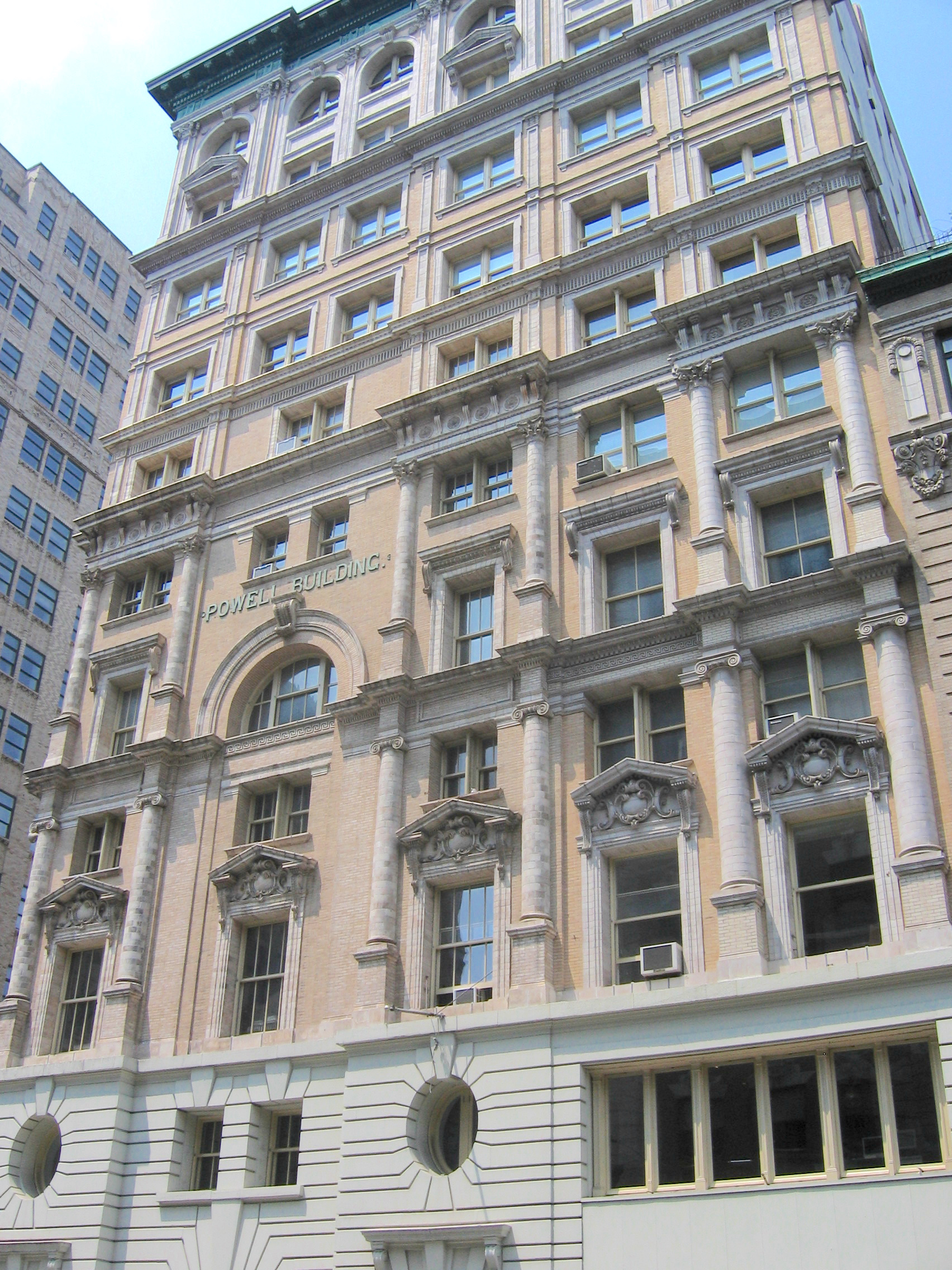
Powell Building

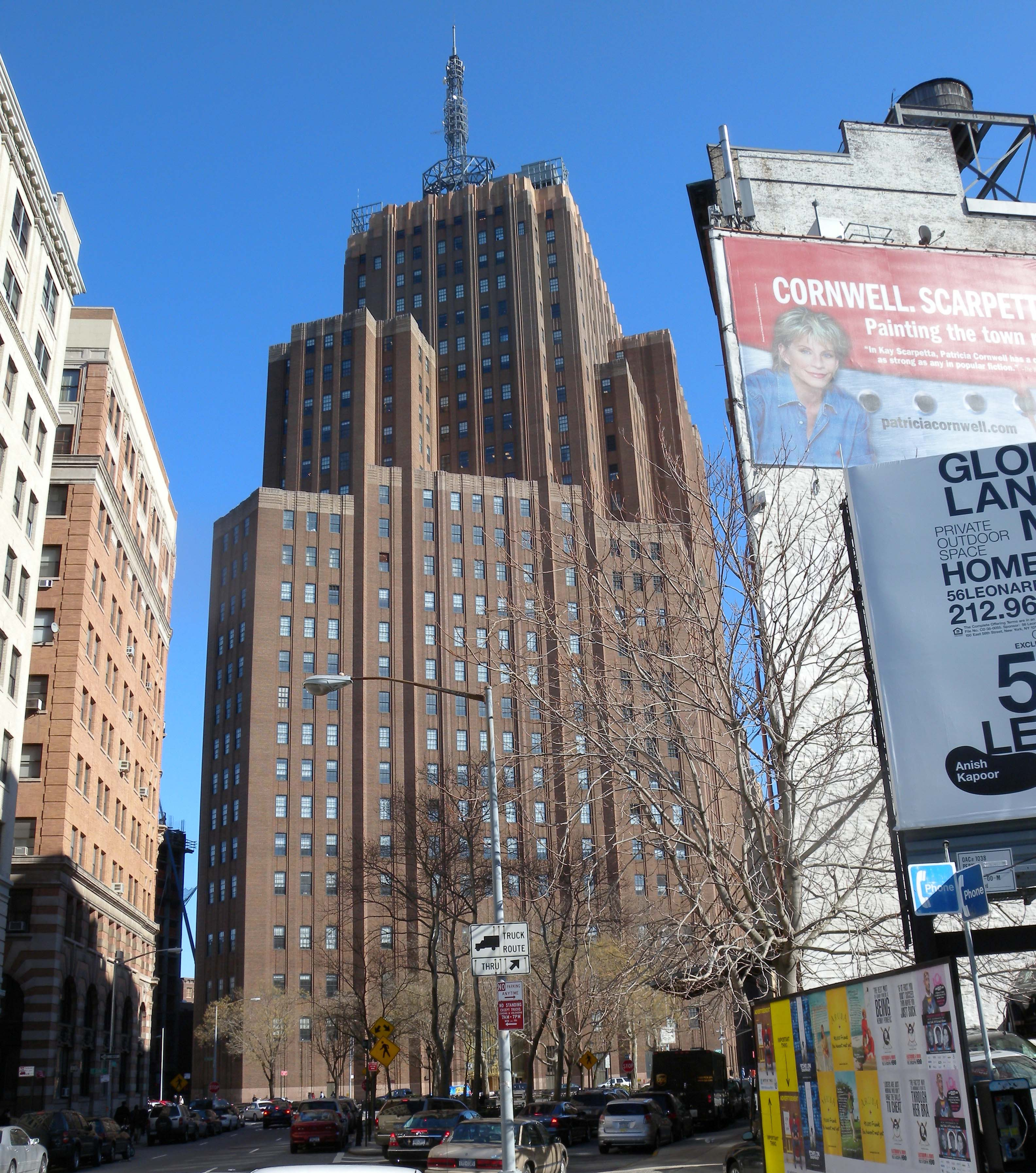
AT&T Long Distance Building at 32 Avenue of the Americas

- 32 Avenue of the Americas, an Art Deco building, is the former site of the AT&T Long Lines division.
- 388 Greenwich Street, an office building near the northwestern corner of Tribeca, is the headquarters of the corporate and investment banking arm of financial services corporation Citigroup.
- Borough of Manhattan Community College (BMCC) is part of the City University of New York. The college campus is located between Chambers Street and N. Moore Street, spanning four blocks. BMCC's Fiterman Hall, severely damaged in the September 11, 2001, attacks, was demolished and has been rebuilt.
- Holland Tunnel connecting New York to New Jersey has its entrances and exits in the northwest corner of Tribeca, centered around St. John's Park.
- Hook & Ladder Company No. 8, a still-in-use firehouse at North Moore Street, was the site of the filming of the Ghostbusters movies. Memorabilia from the movies is displayed inside. Another film, Hitch, with Will Smith, also filmed a short but notable scene at the firehouse.
- Hudson River Park, a waterside park on the Hudson River, it extends from 59th Street south to Battery Park. It runs through the Manhattan neighborhoods of Lower Manhattan, Battery Park City, TriBeCa, Greenwich Village, Gansevoort Market (The Meatpacking District), Chelsea, Midtown West, Hudson Yards, and Hell's Kitchen (Clinton). It is a joint New York State and New York City collaboration and is a 550-acre (2.2 km^{2}) park, the biggest in Manhattan after Central Park. The park arose as part of the West Side Highway replacement project in the wake of the abandoned Westway plan.
- Kitchen, Montross & Wilcox Store, a landmarked building in Tribeca, was built in 1861.
- 401 Greenwich Street, a historic Tribeca building notable as the birthplace of modern bowling.
- Metropolitan College of New York, a private, independent educational institution, is located on Canal Street.
- New York Academy of Art, a private, graduate art school that focuses on technical training and critical discourse.
- New York Law School, a private, independent law school, was founded in 1891, and has been located in several buildings in Tribeca since 1962, principally along Worth Street between Church Street and West Broadway.
- Nutopian Embassy, Located at 1 White Street (at the corner of White Street and West Broadway), this townhouse was the embassy location of John Lennon and Yoko Ono's conceptual country of Nutopia. It was built sometime between 1805 and 1825 and has been used as both a townhouse residence as well as a cafe space. The building in its entirety is now being used as a restaurant.
- Stuyvesant High School, one of the nine specialized high schools in New York City, is located at 345 Chambers Street in nearby Battery Park City. The Tribeca Bridge was built to assure the safety of the students who need to get across West Street to get to the building.
- Verizon Building, a landmarked building in Tribeca, was built between 1923 and 1927. It was converted into condominiums in 2016.
- Washington Market Park, bounded by Greenwich, Chambers, and West Streets, is a 1.61-acre (6,500 m^{2}) park that is popular with children for its large playground. The park also has community gardens and hosts community events.

=== Historic districts ===
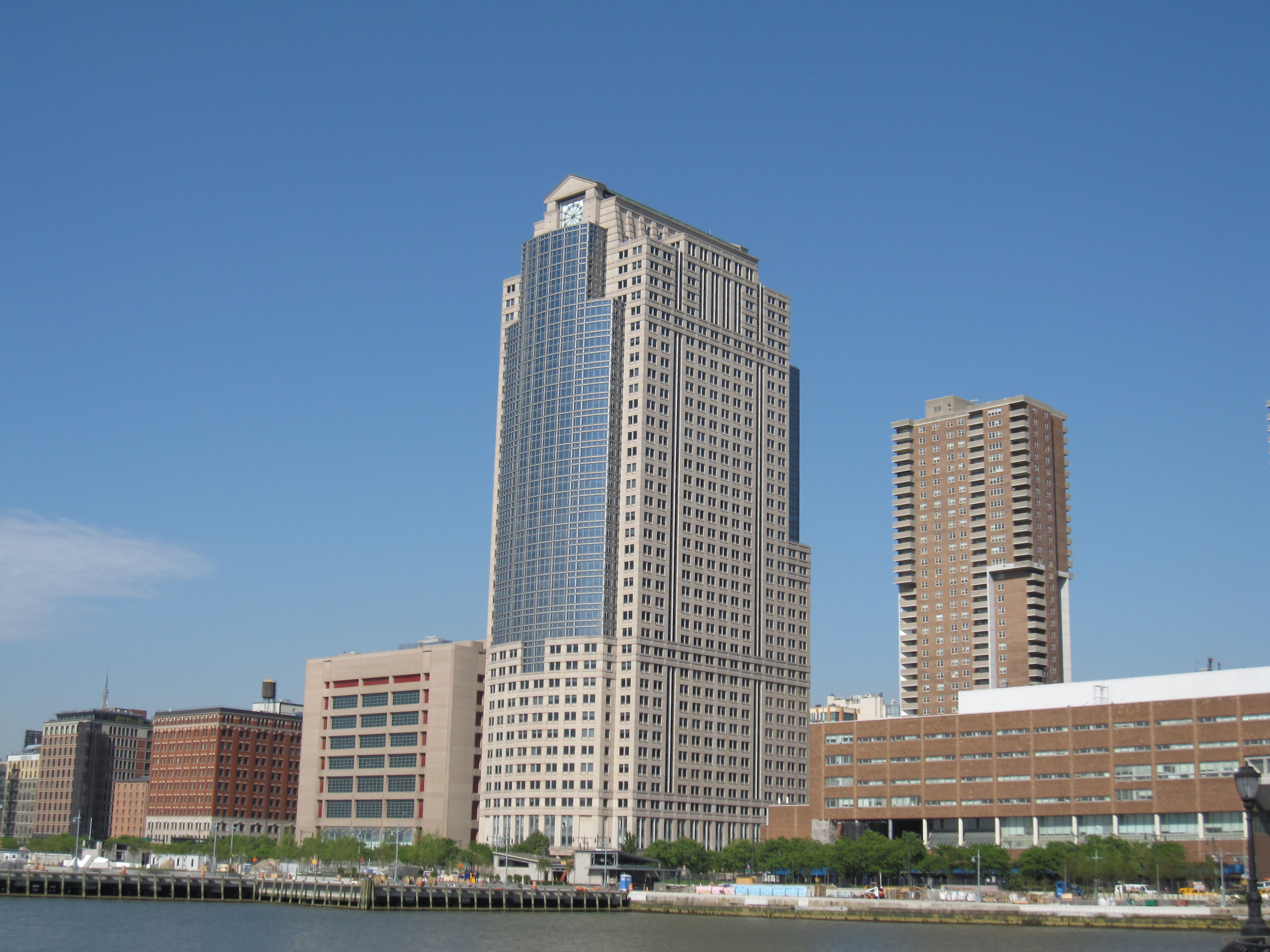
388 Greenwich Street

Four New York City Landmarks Preservation Commission-designated four historic districts within Tribeca in 1991 and 1992, as well as an extension of one in 2002:

- Tribeca West – designated May 7, 1991
- Tribeca East – designated December 2, 1992
- Tribeca North – designated December 8, 1992
- Tribeca South – designated December 8, 1992
- Tribeca South Extension – designated November 19, 2002

== Police and crime ==
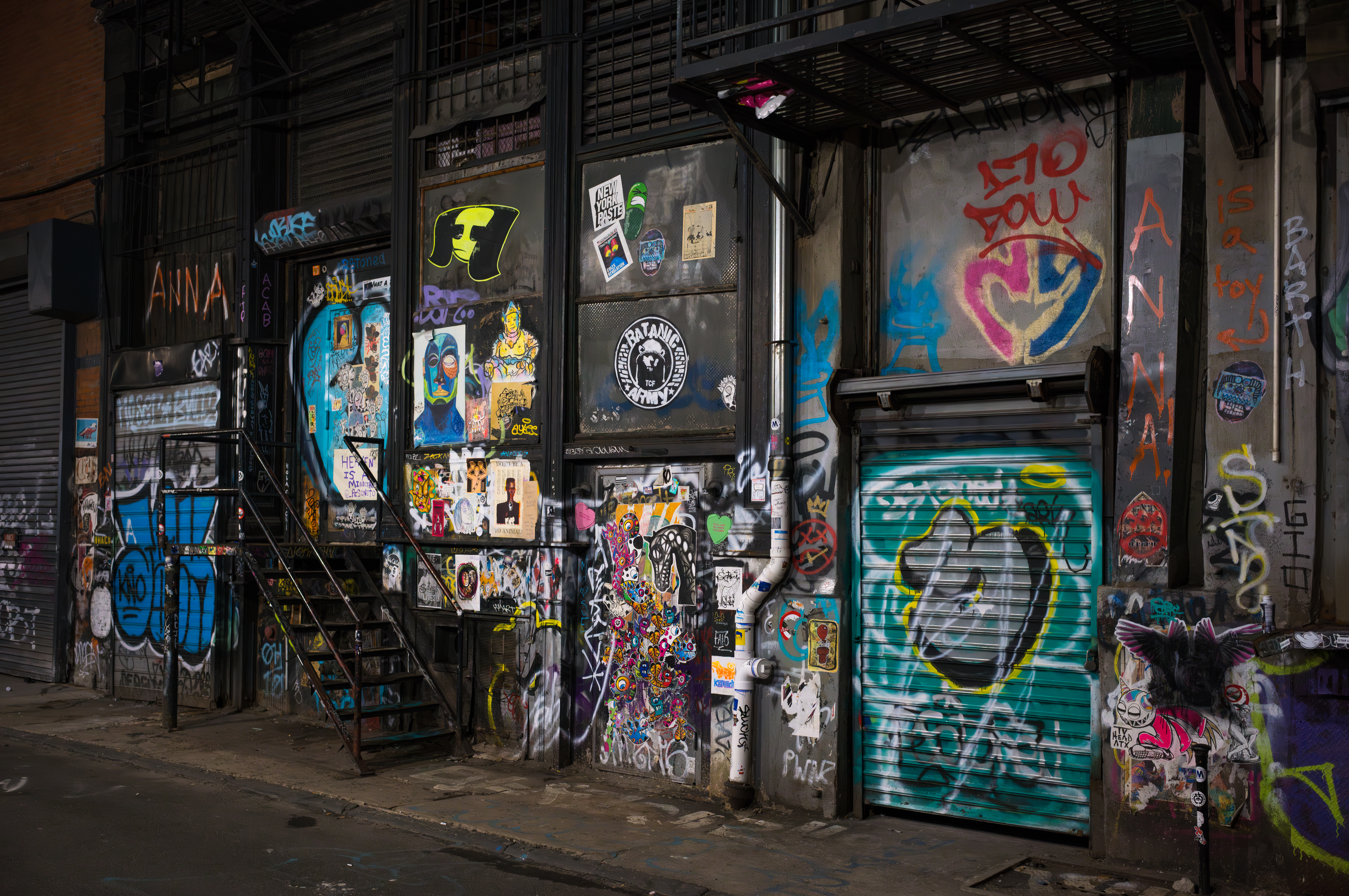
Cortlandt Alley at night

Tribeca and Lower Manhattan are patrolled by the 1st Precinct of the NYPD, located at 16 Ericsson Place. The 1st Precinct ranked 63rd safest out of 69 patrol areas for per-capita crime in 2010. Though the number of crimes is low compared to other NYPD precincts, the residential population is also much lower. As of 2018, with a non-fatal assault rate of 24 per 100,000 people, Tribeca and Lower Manhattan's rate of violent crimes per capita is less than that of the city as a whole. The incarceration rate of 152 per 100,000 people is lower than that of the city as a whole.

The 1st Precinct has a lower crime rate than in the 1990s, with crimes across all categories having decreased by 86.3% between 1990 and 2018. The precinct reported 1 murder, 23 rapes, 80 robberies, 61 felony assaults, 85 burglaries, 1,085 grand larcenies, and 21 grand larcenies auto in 2018.

== Fire safety ==
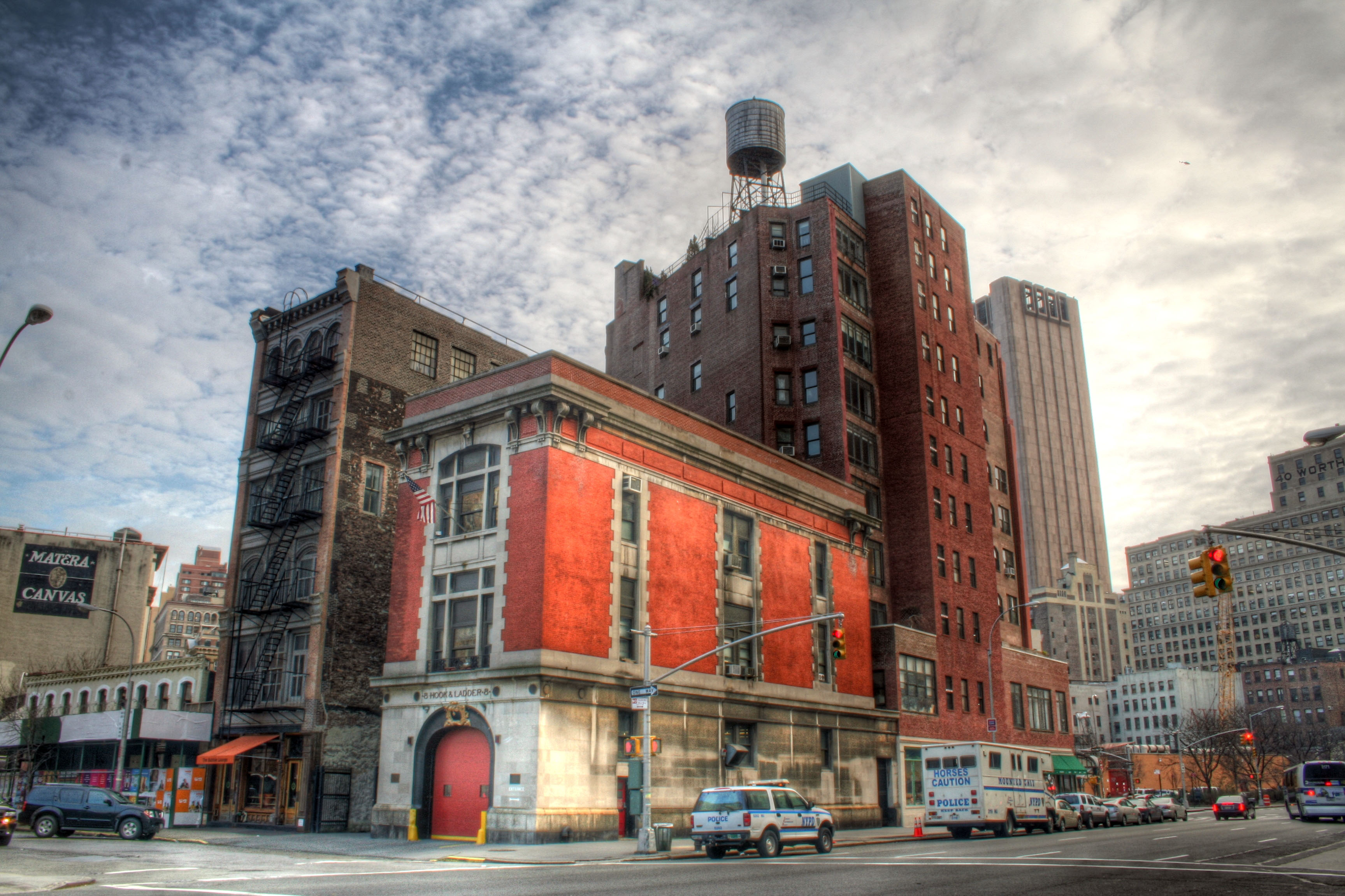
New York City Fire Department Ladder Company 8 firehouse at Varick and N. Moore Streets

Tribeca is served by two New York City Fire Department (FDNY) fire stations. Engine Company 7/Ladder Company 1/Battalion 1 is located at 100 Duane Street while Ladder Company 8, which appears in the Ghostbusters films, is located at 14 North Moore Street.

== Health ==
As of 2018, preterm births and births to teenage mothers are less common in Tribeca and Lower Manhattan than in other places citywide. In Tribeca and Lower Manhattan, there were 77 preterm births per 1,000 live births (compared to 87 per 1,000 citywide), and 2.2 births to teenage mothers per 1,000 live births (compared to 19.3 per 1,000 citywide), though the teenage birth rate is based on a small sample size. Tribeca and Lower Manhattan have a low population of residents who are uninsured. In 2018, this population of uninsured residents was estimated to be 4%, less than the citywide rate of 12%, though this was based on a small sample size.

The concentration of fine particulate matter, the deadliest type of air pollutant, in Tribeca and Lower Manhattan is 0.0096 milligrams per cubic metre (9.6×10^{−9} oz/ft^{3}), more than the city average. Sixteen percent of Tribeca and Lower Manhattan residents are smokers, which is more than the city average of 14% of residents being smokers. In Tribeca and Lower Manhattan, 4% of residents are obese, 3% are diabetic, and 15% have high blood pressure, the lowest rates in the city—compared to the citywide averages of 24%, 11%, and 28% respectively. In addition, 5% of children are obese, the lowest rate in the city, compared to the citywide average of 20%.

Ninety-six percent of residents eat some fruits and vegetables every day, which is more than the city's average of 87%. In 2018, 88% of residents described their health as "good," "very good", or "excellent", more than the city's average of 78%. For every supermarket in Tribeca and Lower Manhattan, there are 6 bodegas.

The nearest major hospital is NewYork-Presbyterian Lower Manhattan Hospital in the Civic Center area.

== Post offices and ZIP Codes ==
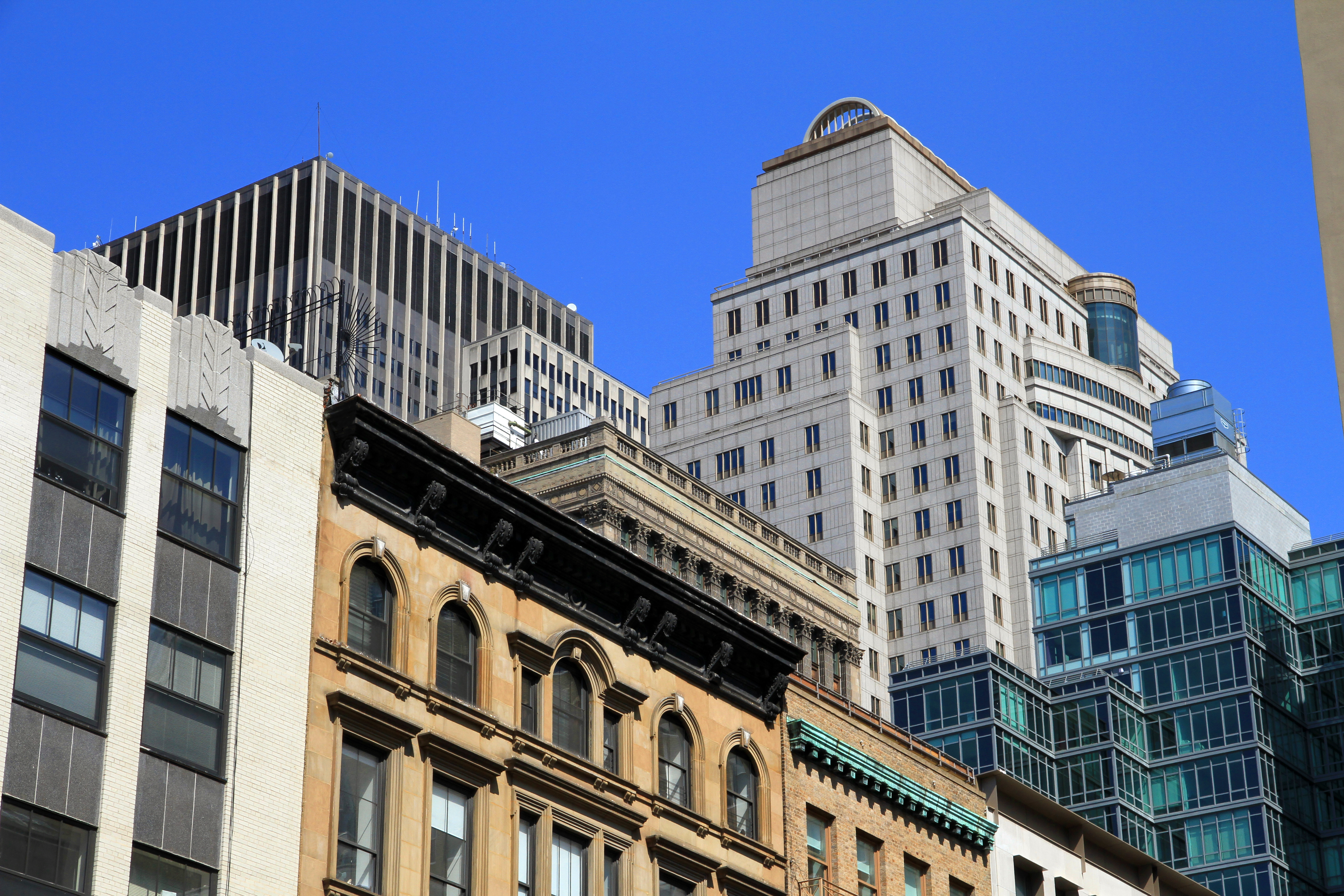
Church & Chambers Street

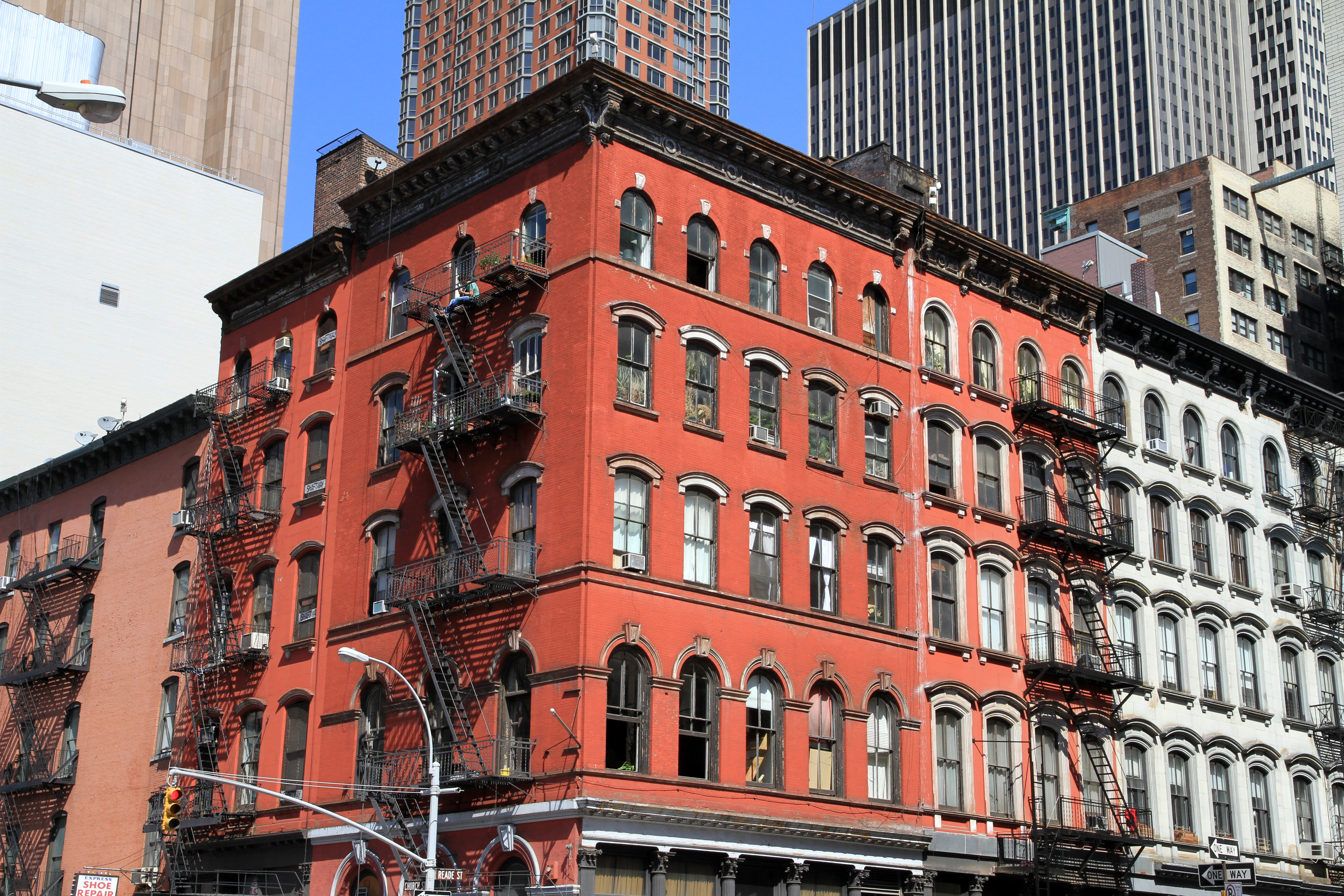
Church & Reade Street (2013)

Tribeca is located within two primary ZIP Codes. Most of the neighborhood is covered by 10013, but the southernmost blocks are located in 10007, and the Jacob K. Javits Federal Building is located in 10278. The United States Postal Service operates two post offices near Tribeca: the Federal Plaza Station at 26 Federal Plaza and the Canal Street Station at 350 Canal Street.

== Education ==
Tribeca and Lower Manhattan generally have a higher rate of college-educated residents than the rest of the city as of 2018. The vast majority of residents age 25 and older (84%) have a college education or higher, while 4% have less than a high school education and 12% are high school graduates or have some college education. By contrast, 64% of Manhattan residents and 43% of city residents have a college education or higher. The percentage of Tribeca and Lower Manhattan students excelling in math rose from 61% in 2000 to 80% in 2011, and reading achievement increased from 66% to 68% during the same time period.

Tribeca and Lower Manhattan's rate of elementary school student absenteeism is lower than the rest of New York City. In Tribeca and Lower Manhattan, 6% of elementary school students missed twenty or more days per school year, less than the citywide average of 20%. Additionally, 96% of high school students in Tribeca and Lower Manhattan graduate on time, more than the citywide average of 75%.

=== Schools ===
The New York City Department of Education operates the following public schools nearby:

- PS 150 (grades PK-5)
- PS 234 Independence School (grades K–5)

=== Libraries ===
The New York Public Library (NYPL) operates two branches nearby. The New Amsterdam branch is located at 9 Murray Street near Broadway. It was established on the ground floor of an office building in 1989. The Battery Park City branch is located at 175 North End Avenue near Murray Street. Completed in 2010, the two-story branch is NYPL's first LEED-certified branch.

== Notable people ==
- Edward Albee (1928–2016), playwright
- Laurie Anderson (born 1947), avant-garde artist, composer, musician, and film director
- Arman (1928–2005), artist
- Karole Armitage (born 1954), dancer and choreographer
- Robert Ashley (1930–2014), composer
- Bill Barrett (born 1934), sculptor, painter, and jeweler
- Paul Bettany (born 1971), actor
- Kate Betts (born 1964), fashion journalist
- Beyoncé (born 1981), singer, songwriter, record producer, and dancer
- Jessica Biel (born 1982), actress
- Robert Bingham (1966–1999), writer
- Ross Bleckner (born 1949), artist
- Eric Bogosian (born 1953), actor, playwright, monologuist, novelist, and historian
- Edward Burns (born 1968), actor and filmmaker
- Mariah Carey (born 1969), singer, songwriter, record producer, and actress
- Jennifer Connelly (born 1970), actress
- Daniel Craig (born 1968), actor
- Billy Crystal (born 1948), actor, comedian, and filmmaker
- Kid Cudi (born 1984), rapper, singer, songwriter, record producer, actor, and fashion designer
- Robert De Niro (born 1943), actor
- Carroll Dunham (born 1949), painter
- Lena Dunham (born 1986), writer, director, actress, and producer
- Elvis Duran (born 1964), radio personality
- Kyle Eastwood (born 1968), jazz bassist and film composer
- The Edge (born 1961), musician, singer, and songwriter
- Fredrik Eklund (born 1977), real estate broker, former IT entrepreneur, reality TV star, and author
- Mark Epstein (born 1953), author and psychotherapist
- Marisol Escobar (1930–2016), sculptor
- Kat Foster (born 1978), actress
- Bethenny Frankel (born 1970), businesswoman, TV personality, entrepreneur, and author
- Marián Gáborík (born 1982), former professional ice hockey player
- Dave Gahan (born 1962), singer and songwriter
- James Gandolfini (1961–2013), actor
- Sarah Michelle Gellar (born 1977), actress
- Dan Goldman (born 1976), U.S. representative
- Heather Graham (born 1970), actress
- Red Grooms (born 1937), multimedia artist
- Don Gummer (born 1946), sculptor
- Savannah Guthrie (born 1971), broadcast journalist and attorney
- Richard Handler (born 1961), businessman
- Mariska Hargitay (born 1964), actress, director, producer, and philanthropist
- Josh Hartnett (born 1978), actor and producer
- James Havard (1937–2020), painter and sculptor
- Peter Hermann (born 1967), actor, producer, and writer
- Grace Hightower (born 1955), philanthropist, socialite, actress, and singer
- Bob Holman (born 1948), poet and poetry activist
- Paz de la Huerta (born 1984), actress and model
- Chanel Iman (born 1990), model
- Michael Imperioli (born 1966), actor, writer, and musician
- Jay-Z (born 1969), rapper, record producer, and entrepreneur
- Richard Jefferson (born 1980), former professional basketball player and sports analyst
- Derek Jeter (born 1974), former professional baseball player, businessman, and baseball executive
- Mimi Johnson, arts administrator
- Harvey Keitel (born 1939), actor
- Carolyn Bessette-Kennedy (1966–1999), publicist and wife of John F. Kennedy Jr.
- John F. Kennedy Jr. (1960–1999), attorney, journalist, and magazine publisher
- Daniel Kessler (born 1974), musician
- Karolina Kurkova (born 1984), model and actress
- Ronnie Landfield (born 1947), abstract painter
- Jodi Long (born 1954), actress
- Adrian Lyne (1941), director, writer, and producer
- Neal Marshad (born 1952), producer, director, cinematographer, advertising executive, internet strategist, and designer
- Chris Martin (born 1977), singer-songwriter and musician
- Danny Masterson (born 1976), actor
- Mike McCready (born 1968), music entrepreneur
- Shane McMahon (born 1970), businessman and professional wrestler
- Debra Messing (born 1968), actress
- Taylor Momsen (born 1993), singer, songwriter, model, and former actress
- Toni Morrison (1931–2019), novelist
- Sean Murray (born 1977), actor
- Casey Neistat (born 1981), YouTube personality, filmmaker, and vlogger
- Petra Němcová (born 1979), model, TV host, and philanthropist
- Gwyneth Paltrow (born 1972), actress and businesswoman
- Richard Parsons (born 1948), business executive
- Jean Passanante (born 1953), TV screenwriter
- Mizuo Peck (born 1977), actress
- Mike Piazza (born 1968), former professional baseball player
- Amy Poehler (born 1971), comedian, actress, writer, producer, and director
- Jane Pratt (born 1962), magazine editor and publisher
- Rammellzee (1960–2010), visual artist, gothic futurist "graffiti writer", painter, performance artist, art theoretician, sculptor, and hip hop musician
- Norman Reedus (born 1969), actor
- Lou Reed (1942–2013), musician, songwriter, and poet
- Roger Rees (1944–2015), actor and director
- Steve Reich (born 1936), composer
- Brad Richards (born 1980), former professional ice hockey player
- Kelly Ripa (born 1970), actress and talk show host
- David O. Russell (born 1958), filmmaker
- Juan Samuel (born 1960), former professional baseball player
- Richard Serra (1938–2024), artist
- John Shaw (1948–2019), painter and printmaker
- Jake Shears (born 1978), singer and songwriter
- Arlene Shechet (born 1951), artist
- Duncan Sheik (born 1969), singer-songwriter and composer
- M. Night Shyamalan (born 1970), filmmaker and actor
- Laurie Simmons (born 1949), artist, photographer, and filmmaker
- Gary Sinise (born 1955), actor, humanitarian, and musician
- Shane Smith (born 1969), journalist and media executive
- Laurie Spiegel (born 1945), composer
- George Steel, musician
- Alexis Stewart (born 1965), TV host and radio personality
- Jon Stewart (born 1962), comedian, political commentator, actor, director, and TV host
- Michael Stipe (born 1960), singer-songwriter and artist
- Dominique Strauss-Kahn (born 1949), economist and politician
- Meryl Streep (born 1949), actress
- Taylor Swift (born 1989), singer-songwriter
- Bob Telson (born 1949), composer, songwriter, and pianist
- Uma Thurman (born 1970), actress and former model
- Justin Timberlake (born 1981), singer, songwriter, and actor
- Christy Turlington (born 1969), model and humanitarian
- Richard Tuttle (born 1941), postminimalist artist
- Neil deGrasse Tyson (born 1958), astrophysicist, author, and science communicator
- Mo Vaughn (born 1967), former professional baseball player
- Cecilia Vicuña (born 1948), poet and artist
- Lauren Weisberger (born 1977), novelist and author
- Jack Whitten (1939–2018), painter and sculptor
- Kate Winslet (born 1975), actress
- Dean Winters (born 1964), actor
- Warner Wolf (born 1937), TV and radio sports broadcaster
- Christopher Woodrow (born 1977), entrepreneur, financier, and movie producer
- La Monte Young (born 1935), composer, musician, and performance artist

== In popular culture ==
Robert De Niro and Jane Rosenthal had high profiles in the district's revival when they co-produced the dramatic television anthology series TriBeCa in 1993 and co-founded the annual Tribeca Film Festival in 2002. De Niro also claimed ownership of all domain names incorporating the text "Tribeca" for domain names with any content related to film festivals. In particular, he had a dispute with the owner of the website tribeca.net. The short-lived anthology television series on Fox focused on the lives of people in Tribeca. The show's cast members included Peter Boyle, Joe Morton, Eli Wallach, Eileen Brennan, and Laurence Fishburne.

Although Wizards of Waverly Place includes a fictional "Tribeca Prep", exterior shots were filmed at P.S. 40 on East 20th Street, between First Avenue and Second Avenue in midtown Gramercy Park. In addition, a fictional "Tribeca High School" appears in the Law & Order: Special Victims Unit episode "Granting Immunity." Local radio station WHTZ's studio is located here. In the third book of the Witches of East End series, Winds of Salem, the Oracle, an almighty god from Asgard, lives in Tribeca.

The Subaru Tribeca, which went into production in 2005, and was discontinued being sold in the United States in 2012, was an automobile named after the neighborhood.
