= Washington Market Park =

Public park in Manhattan, New York

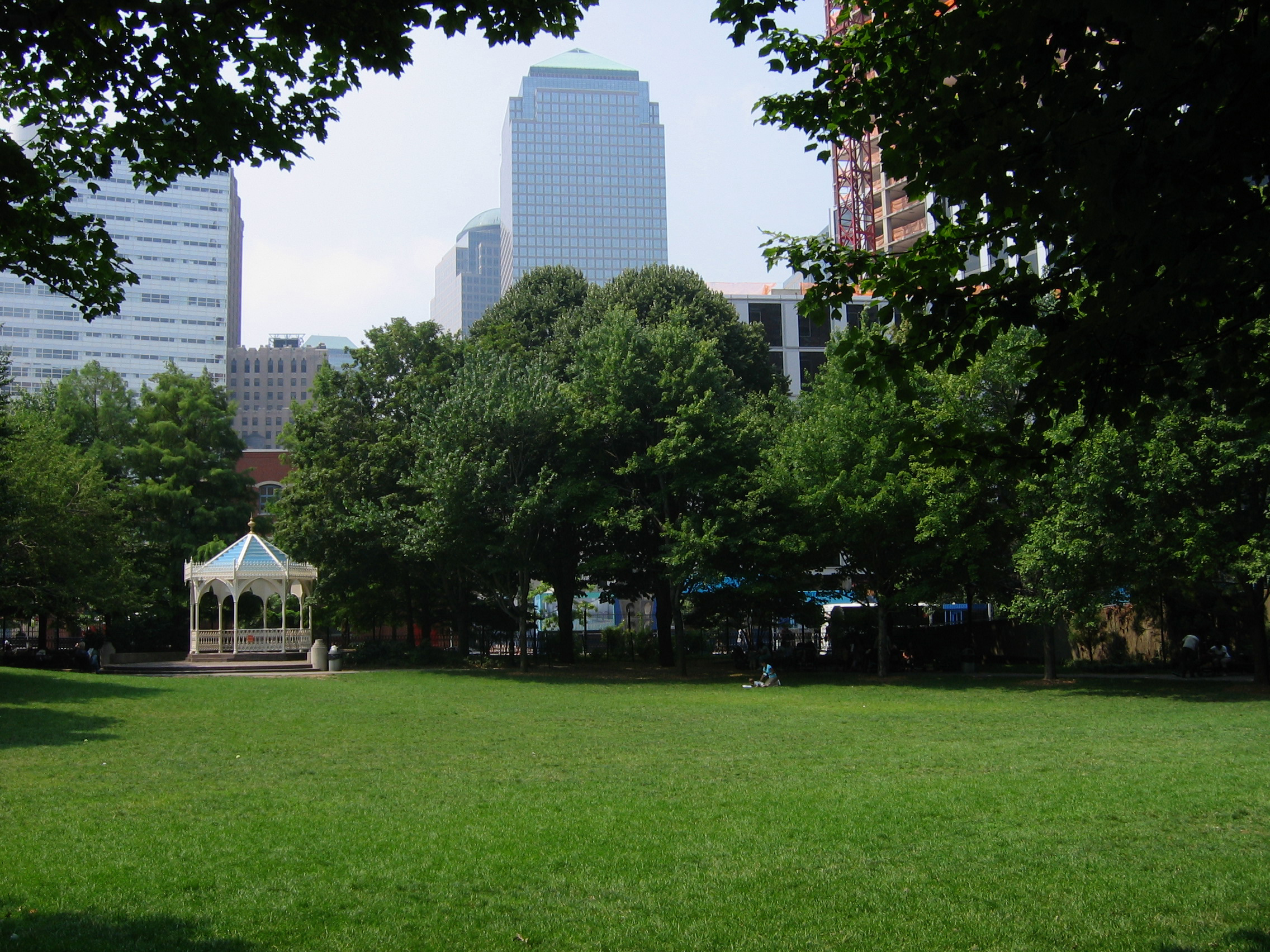
- Washington Market Park. The towers of the World Financial Center can be seen in the background (center, skyline).
- Interactive map of Washington Market Park
- Coordinates: 40°43′2″N 74°0′41″W
- Area: 1.61 acres (0.65 ha)

Washington Market Park is an urban park located in the TriBeCa neighborhood of Lower Manhattan in New York City. The park, which is bounded by Greenwich, Chambers, and West Streets, covers 1.61-acre (6,500 m^{2}). The park has community gardens and a large playground and hosts community events.

== History ==
The city of New York proposed the construction of a municipal parking lot on a disused dump site located just south of the Independence Plaza apartments in the late 1970s. Residents of TriBeCa, including former New York City councilwoman Kathryn E. Freed, protested the planned parking lot and campaigned for a new city park in their neighborhood. At the time, Duane Park, a small triangle, was one of the few green spaces in TriBeCa. The activists successfully persuaded officials to build a park, which was called Washington Market Park, instead of the parking lot.

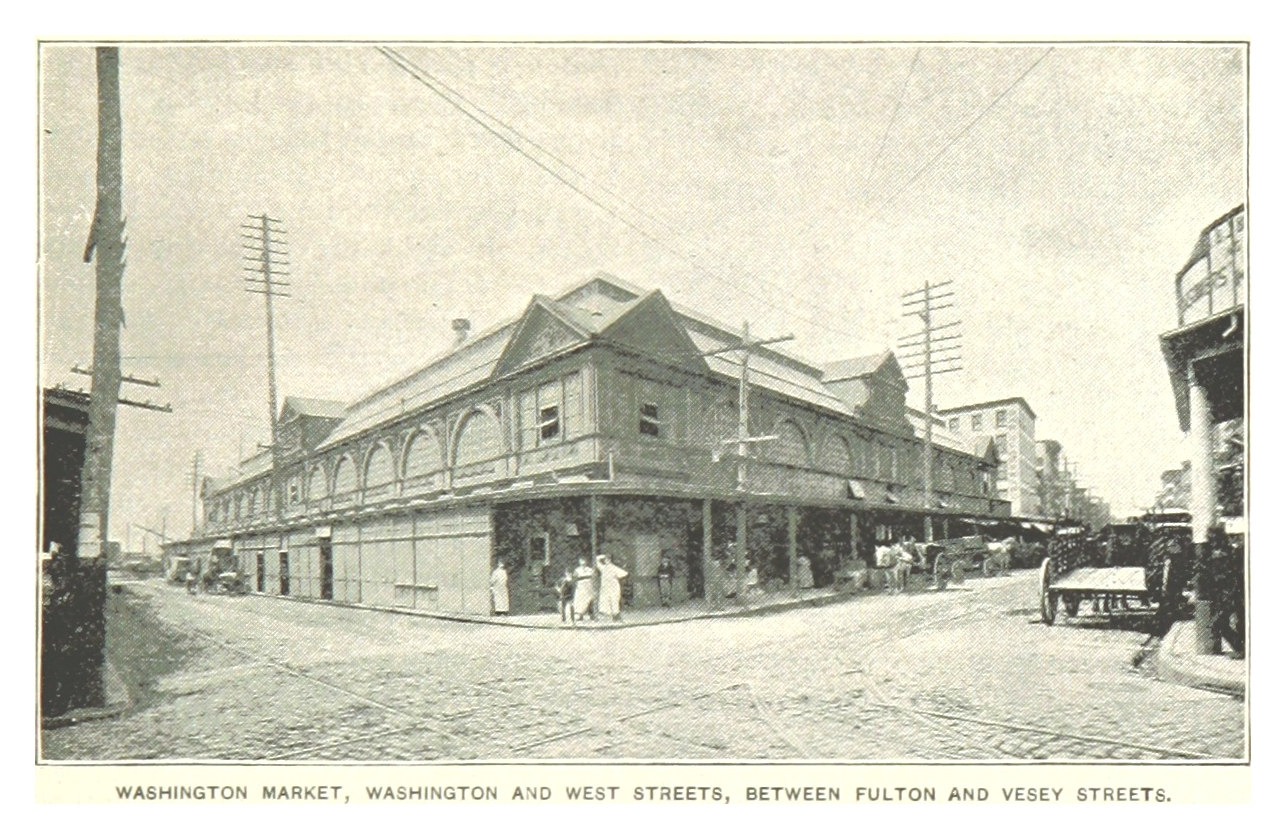
Washington Market, c. 1890

In the late 1970s, a federally-funded Community Block Development Grant was obtained from the city and used to design and build the existing park. Lee Weintraub, then an architect with the city's Housing and Development Administration (HDA), was assigned to design the park. A not-for-profit corporation, Washington Market Community Park, Inc, was created in 1978 to oversee the park, to be run by a board of directors elected by the community.

Washington Market Park opened in April 1983. It is named for the former Washington Market, which functioned as New York City's most important wholesale produce market, reaching its peak between 1880 and 1910. New York City tore down the nearby Washington Market buildings in the 1960s when the wholesale produce industry relocated to Hunts Point in the Bronx.

In 2003, Mayor Michael Bloomberg included Washington Market Park as one of twelve parks in Lower Manhattan which received a combined $25 million in upgrades from the Lower Manhattan Development Corporation.
