= Hit Song Science =

Term referring to the probability of the popularity of songs

Hit Song Science is a term coined by Mike McCready and trademarked by the company he co-founded, Polyphonic HMI. It concerns the possibility of predicting whether a song will be a hit, before its distribution using automated means such as machine learning software.

== Scientific background ==
The scientific nature of Hit Song Science is a subject of debate in the music information retrieval (MIR) community. Early studies claimed that using machine learning techniques could capture some information from audio signals and lyrics that would explain popularity. However, a larger-scale evaluation contradicts the claims of “Hit Song Science”, i.e. that the popularity of a music title can be learned effectively from known audio features. Many other reasons, including the well-known cumulative advantage or preferential attachment effects deeply contradicts the possibility of practical applications. Nevertheless, automatic prediction techniques are the basis of hit counseling businesses (HSS Technology). Recent work by Herremans et al. has shown that audio features can indeed be used to outperform a random oracle when predicting top 10 versus top 30-40 hits.

== Commercial applications ==
A technology proposing to exploit Hit Song Science was introduced in 2003 by an artificial intelligence company out of Barcelona, Spain, called Polyphonic HMI. Polyphonic HMI has since spun off a new Delaware C corporation, Music Intelligence Solutions, Inc., which used to run uPlaya, a site geared toward music professionals. In 2006 however one of the company's founders, Mike McCready left to pursue another direction in the digital music space. The idea of Hit Song Science has generated response from many in the music industry, including Chuck D, Robert Lamm, Stratton Leopold, Gregg Scholl of The Orchard, and officials at The Sync Agency as well as Blue Infinity Music. Prior to McCready's departure, Hit Song Science was profiled by NBC, BBC and various major news outlets. The plotline of an episode of "Numb3rs" was inspired by the technology. Music Intelligence Solutions, Inc., is using Hit Song Science as a basis for several contests done in partnership with organizations such as AllHipHop.com, Urban Latino and American Songwriter magazine, and claims to have predicted the commercial success of Norah Jones's debut album, Come Away with Me, (which won a Grammy for Best Album) and Ben Novak's debut single, "Turn Your Car Around", which reached the number 12 spot in the UK Top 40 charts.

Similar technologies are now emerging with companies such as Mixcloud, MusicXray, and BandMetrics who are using their technologies. Mixcloud is working with Queen Mary Technologies.
