= Come Away with Me =

2002 studio album by Norah Jones

Studio album by Norah Jones
- Released: February 26, 2002
- Recorded: September 20, 2000 – December 2001
- Studios: Sorcerer Sound, New York City; Allaire, Shokan, New York
- Genres: Acoustic pop; blues-pop; soft rock; country soul
- Length: 45:03
- Label: Blue Note
- Producers: Arif Mardin; Jay Newland; Norah Jones; Craig Street

Norah Jones chronology
First Sessions (2001)	Come Away with Me (2002)	Live in New Orleans (2003)

Singles from Come Away with Me
- 1. "Don't Know Why" Released: January 28, 2002; 2. "Feelin' the Same Way" Released: August 5, 2002; 3. "Come Away with Me" Released: September 30, 2002; 4. "Turn Me On" Released: May 12, 2003

Come Away with Me is the debut album by American recording artist Norah Jones, released on February 26, 2002, by Blue Note Records. Recording sessions took place at Sorcerer Sound Studio in New York City and Allaire Studios in Shokan, New York.

Come Away with Me peaked at number one on the US Billboard 200 chart and received Grammy Awards for Album of the Year and Best Pop Vocal Album. It was later certified Diamond by the RIAA on February 15, 2005, for shipments of over ten million copies in the United States, and has sold over 27 million copies worldwide as of 2016, making it one of the best-selling albums of all time, the best-selling debut album by a female artist of all time, and the second best-selling album of the 21st century.

== Composition ==
"Don't Know Why"
A sample of "Don't Know Why"

Come Away with Me is an acoustic pop and blues pop album that features Jones supported by Kevin Breit, Bill Frisell, Adam Levy, Adam Rogers, and Tony Scherr on guitar; Sam Yahel on organ; Jenny Scheinman on violin; Rob Burger on accordion; and Brian Blade, Dan Rieser, and Kenny Wollesen on drums —all jazz musicians with a leaning to Americana. The recording of Come Away with Me started on September 20, 2000 and ended in December 2001. Jones wrote the title song. Guitarist Jesse Harris wrote "Don't Know Why". The album includes Jones' versions of "The Nearness of You" by Hoagy Carmichael and "Cold, Cold Heart" by Hank Williams, the former deliberately chosen to be the closing track to the album by producer Arif Mardin.

Come Away with Me incorporates blues, jazz, folk, soul, and country. Bobby Dodd of All About Jazz writes that although the album features jazz standards, jazz purists and academics "may deny [Jones] jazz credibility for her folk infusion".

== Commercial performance ==
Come Away with Me debuted at number 139 on the US Billboard 200 upon its release in February 2002 selling 10,000 copies in its first week. Despite being released at a time when music piracy was high and album sales were declining, the album was certified Platinum by the Recording Industry Association of America (RIAA) in August that same year. The album eventually climbed to the top of the Billboard 200 in January 2003, almost a year after it was released selling 108,000 copies that week. By the time of the Grammy Awards the following month, Come Away with Me had already sold 3 million copies in the country. Jones' success at the award show resulted in the album moving another 600,000 copies the week immediately following the awards. CDs of the album were sold at Starbucks stores and at a retail price of $9.99, lower than most albums at the time. In total, the album appeared on the Billboard 200 for 165 weeks and sold 11.1 million copies in the US as of March 2016. The album was certified Diamond by the RIAA in February 2005 for selling over ten million copies in the US. It was also the eleventh best-selling album of the Nielsen SoundScan era as of 2016.

As of October 2016, the album had sold more than 27 million copies worldwide. Polyphonic HMI's "Hit Song Science" software claimed to have predicted the album's success months before its release, contradicting skeptical executives. In Germany, the album debuted at No. 37. It remained on the German Albums Chart for 141 weeks and reached No. 2 in its 37th week on that chart, where it stayed for four weeks. Come Away with Me sold 750,000 copies, reaching 5× gold, becoming her most successful album in Germany and one of the longest charting albums on the German Albums Chart.

== Critical reception ==
Professional ratings
Aggregate scores
Source	Rating
Metacritic	82/100
Review scores
Source	Rating
AllMusic	4/5 stars
Chicago Sun-Times	3.5/4 stars
DownBeat	3.5/5 stars
Entertainment Weekly	A−
The Guardian	3/5 stars
Los Angeles Times	3.5/4 stars
The Philadelphia Inquirer	3.5/4 stars
Pitchfork	7.5/10
Rolling Stone	3.5/5 stars
Vibe	3.5/5

Come Away with Me received acclaim from music critics. At Metacritic, which assigns a normalized rating out of 100 to reviews from mainstream critics, the album has an average score of 82 out of 100, which indicates "universal acclaim" based on 9 reviews.

The album received 3.5 out of 4 stars from both the Chicago Sun-Times and the Los Angeles Times reviews. AllMusic's David R. Adler wrote that "while the mood of this record stagnates after a few songs, it does give a strong indication of Jones' alluring talents." Robert Christgau of The Village Voice cited it as "the most unjazz album [Blue Note] has ever released" and criticized that "Jones's voice dominates the record."

The A.V. Club gave it a favorable review and called the album "A showcase for Jones' remarkable voice, the disc captures a singer whose rare instinct for interpretation always serves the song, rather than working against it." E! Online gave it an A and stated: "Gorgeous and intimate, the 14 songs on her debut disc ache with romantic maturity and a smart, slow-jam sexiness that belies the fact that, at 22, Jones is hardly older than Britney Spears."

Kludge included it on their list of best albums of 2002. Mark Beaumont, writing for NME in 2016, included it on his list of eight of the all-time best-selling albums in the UK that have no redeeming features whatsoever, dubbing it "soporific, simplistic jazz wallpaper muzak".

== 20th anniversary edition ==
In April 2022, a remastered expanded edition of Come Away with Me was released, with demos from the promo-only First Sessions EP, and including 22 previously unreleased demos, outtakes, and alternative versions.

== Track listing ==
No.	Title	Writer(s)	Length
1.	"Don't Know Why"	Jesse Harris	3:06
2.	"Seven Years"	Lee Alexander	2:25
3.	"Cold Cold Heart"	Hank Williams	3:38
4.	"Feelin' the Same Way"	Alexander	2:55
5.	"Come Away with Me"	Norah Jones	3:18
6.	"Shoot the Moon"	Harris	3:57
7.	"Turn Me On"	John D. Loudermilk	2:33
8.	"Lonestar"	Alexander	3:05
9.	"I've Got to See You Again"	Harris	4:13
10.	"Painter Song"	Alexander; JC Hopkins	2:41
11.	"One Flight Down"	Harris	3:03
12.	"Nightingale"	Jones	4:11
13.	"The Long Day Is Over"	Jones; Harris	2:44
14.	"The Nearness of You"	Hoagy Carmichael; Ned Washington	3:09
Total length:			44:58

iTunes LP deluxe version
No.	Title	Writer(s)	Length
15.	"I'll Be Your Baby Tonight"	Bob Dylan	3:20
16.	"Something Is Calling You" (original demo version)	Harris	3:33
17.	"Peace"	Horace Silver	3:52
18.	"Don't Know Why" (music video)		3:11
19.	"Come Away with Me" (music video)		3:19

20th Anniversary Deluxe Edition Disc Two
No.	Title	Details	Length
1.	"Spring Can Really Hang You Up the Most" (Demo)		3:48
2.	"Walkin’ My Baby Back Home" (Demo)		3:37
3.	"World of Trouble" (Demo)		4:45
4.	"The Only Time" (First Sessions Outtake)		4:32
5.	"I Didn’t Know about You" (First Sessions Outtake)		2:32
6.	"Something Is Calling You (tabla version)" (First Sessions Outtake)		3:22
7.	"Just Like a Dream Today" (First Sessions Outtake)		3:08
8.	"When Sunny Gets Blue" (First Sessions Outtake)		3:09
9.	"What Am I to You" (First Sessions Outtake)		3:30
10.	"Hallelujah I Love Him So" (First Sessions Outtake)		3:05
11.	"Day Dream" (First Sessions Outtake)		3:32
12.	"Don’t Know Why"	from First Sessions	3:09
13.	"Come Away with Me"	from First Sessions	3:05
14.	"Something Is Calling You"	from First Sessions	3:24
15.	"Turn Me On"	from First Sessions	2:35
16.	"Lonestar"	from First Sessions	3:05
17.	"Peace"	from First Sessions	3:51

20th Anniversary Deluxe Edition Disc Three – The Allaire Sessions
No.	Title	Length
1.	"I’ll Be Your Baby Tonight"	3:17
2.	"I’ve Got to See You Again" (Alternate Version)	4:11
3.	"What Would I Do"	4:00
4.	"Come Away with Me" (Alternate Version)	3:27
5.	"Picture in a Frame" (Alternate Mix)	3:32
6.	"Nightingale" (Alternate Version)	4:07
7.	"Peace" (Alternate Version)	2:58
8.	"What Am I to You" (Alternate Version)	3:08
9.	"Painter Song" (Alternate Version)	2:50
10.	"Turn Me On" (Alternate Version)	4:17
11.	"A Little at a Time"	3:03
12.	"One Flight Down" (Alternate Version)	3:33
13.	"Fragile"	3:40

== Personnel ==
- Norah Jones – vocals, piano (except tracks 2, 4, 8), Wurlitzer electric piano (track 4)
- Sam Yahel – Hammond B-3 organ (6, 7, 11)
- Rob Burger – pump organ (8), accordion (10)
- Jesse Harris – acoustic guitar (1, 5, 6, 9, 11–13), electric guitar (1)
- Adam Levy – electric guitar (3, 5, 6, 9, 11, 12), acoustic guitar (8, 10)
- Kevin Breit – acoustic guitar (2, 4), National guitar (2), electric guitar (4, 13)
- Adam Rogers – guitar (7)
- Tony Scherr – slide guitar and acoustic guitar (8)
- Bill Frisell – electric guitar (13)
- Jenny Scheinman – violin (9, 11)
- Lee Alexander – bass (exc. 14)
- Brian Blade – drums (2, 4, 6, 8–10, 12), percussion (2, 9)
- Dan Rieser – drums (1, 5, 7, 11)
- Kenny Wollesen – drums (13)

Technical personnel

- Producers: Arif Mardin, Norah Jones and Jay Newland (2, 4, 13, 2.4/17, original tracks of 1, 7), Craig Street (orig. tracks of 2, 4, 13, 2.1, 2.3/15)
- Engineers: Jay Newland, S. Husky Höskulds (orig. tracks of 2, 4, 13, 2.1, 2.3/15)
- Assistant engineers: Dick Kondas, Mark Birkey (1, 7), Brandon Mason (orig. tracks of 2, 4, 13)
- Mixing: Jay Newland, Arif Mardin (exc. 2, 4, 13)
- Mixing assistant: Todd Parker (2, 4, 13)
- Mastering: Ted Jensen

== Charts ==
=== Weekly charts ===
Chart (2002–2005)	Peak position
Argentinian Albums (CAPIF)	1
Australian Albums (ARIA)	1
Australian Jazz & Blues Albums (ARIA)	1
Austrian Albums (Ö3 Austria)	2
Belgian Albums (Ultratop Flanders)	1
Belgian Albums (Ultratop Wallonia)	1
Canadian Albums (Billboard)	1
Danish Albums (Hitlisten)	1
Dutch Albums (Album Top 100)	1
European Albums (Music & Media)	1
Finnish Albums (Suomen virallinen lista)	5
French Albums (SNEP)	1
German Albums (Offizielle Top 100)	2
Greek Albums (IFPI Greece)	1
Hungarian Albums (MAHASZ)	20
Irish Albums (IRMA)	1
Italian Albums (FIMI)	7
Japanese Albums (Oricon)	10
New Zealand Albums (RMNZ)	1
Norwegian Albums (VG-lista)	1
Polish Albums (ZPAV)	3
Portuguese Albums (AFP)	1
Spanish Albums (PROMUSICAE)	6
Scottish Albums (Official Charts)	1
Singaporean Albums (RIAS)	5
Swedish Albums (Sverigetopplistan)	1
Swiss Albums (Schweizer Hitparade)	2
UK Albums (Official Charts)	1
UK Jazz & Blues Albums (Official Charts)	1
US Billboard 200	1
US Heatseekers Albums (Billboard)	5
US Top Catalog Albums (Billboard)	1
US Top Jazz Albums (Billboard)	1

Chart (2013)	Peak position
South Korean Albums (Circle)	30

Chart (2014)	Peak position
Polish Albums (ZPAV)	1

Chart (2016)	Peak position
Czech Albums (ČNS IFPI)	47

=== Year-end charts ===
Year-end chart performance for Come Away with Me
Chart (2002)	Position
Australian Albums (ARIA)	39
Australian Jazz & Blues Albums (ARIA)	2
Belgian Albums (Ultratop Flanders)	86
Belgian Albums (Ultratop Wallonia)	97
Canadian Albums (Nielsen SoundScan)	17
Canadian Jazz Albums (Nielsen SoundScan)	2
Danish Albums (Hitlisten)	15
Dutch Albums (Album Top 100)	13
European Albums (Music & Media)	12
French Albums (SNEP)	20
German Albums (Offizielle Top 100)	83
Irish Albums (IRMA)	15
Italian Albums (FIMI)	33
New Zealand Albums (RMNZ)	1
Swedish Albums (Sverigetopplistan)	17
Swedish Albums & Compilations (Sverigetopplistan)	23
UK Albums (OCC)	11
US Billboard 200	30
US Top Jazz Albums (Billboard)	10
Worldwide Albums (IFPI)	11

Chart (2003)	Position
Argentine Albums (CAPIF)	19
Australian Albums (ARIA)	2
Australian Jazz & Blues Albums (ARIA)	1
Austrian Albums (Ö3 Austria)	9
Belgian Albums (Ultratop Flanders)	3
Belgian Albums (Ultratop Wallonia)	2
Danish Albums (Hitlisten)	4
Dutch Albums (Album Top 100)	2
European Albums (Music & Media)	1
French Albums (SNEP)	2
German Albums (Offizielle Top 100)	6
Irish Albums (IRMA)	1
Italian Albums (FIMI)	49
Japanese Albums (Oricon)	74
New Zealand Albums (RMNZ)	2
Swedish Albums (Sverigetopplistan)	3
Swedish Albums & Compilations (Sverigetopplistan)	7
Swiss Albums (Schweizer Hitparade)	4
UK Albums (OCC)	5
US Billboard 200	2
US Contemporary Jazz Albums (Billboard)	1
Worldwide Albums (IFPI)	1

Chart (2004)	Position
Australian Albums (ARIA)	41
Australian Jazz & Blues Albums (ARIA)	3
Austrian Albums (Ö3 Austria)	10
Belgian Albums (Ultratop Flanders)	7
Belgian Albums (Ultratop Wallonia)	32
Danish Albums (Hitlisten)	24
Dutch Albums (Album Top 100)	34
European Top 100 Albums (Billboard)	6
French Albums (SNEP)	16
German Albums (Offizielle Top 100)	16
Swedish Albums (Sverigetopplistan)	28
Swedish Albums & Compilations (Sverigetopplistan)	36
Swiss Albums (Schweizer Hitparade)	18
UK Albums (OCC)	52
US Billboard 200	36
US Contemporary Jazz Albums (Billboard)	1
Worldwide Albums (IFPI)	30

Chart (2005)	Position
Australian Jazz & Blues Albums (ARIA)	6
Belgian Midprice Albums (Ultratop Flanders)	8
Belgian Midprice Albums (Ultratop Wallonia)	17
French Albums (SNEP)	140
US Catalog Albums (Billboard)	8
US Contemporary Jazz Albums (Billboard)	3

Chart (2006)	Position
Australian Jazz & Blues Albums (ARIA)	3
Belgian Midprice Albums (Ultratop Flanders)	3
Belgian Midprice Albums (Ultratop Wallonia)	6
US Catalog Albums (Billboard)	12

Chart (2007)	Position
Australian Jazz & Blues Albums (ARIA)	5
Belgian Midprice Albums (Ultratop Flanders)	9
Belgian Midprice Albums (Ultratop Wallonia)	19
US Catalog Albums (Billboard)	13

Chart (2008)	Position
Australian Jazz & Blues Albums (ARIA)	9
Belgian Midprice Albums (Ultratop Flanders)	20
Belgian Midprice Albums (Ultratop Wallonia)	29

Chart (2009)	Position
Australian Jazz & Blues Albums (ARIA)	8

Chart (2010)	Position
Australian Jazz & Blues Albums (ARIA)	5
South Korean International Albums (Circle)	44

Chart (2011)	Position
South Korean International Albums (Circle)	75

Chart (2012)	Position
South Korean International Albums (Circle)	59

Chart (2013)	Position
South Korean International Albums (Circle)	96

Chart (2015)	Position
South Korean International Albums (Circle)	94

Chart (2016)	Position
South Korean International Albums (Circle)	87

Chart (2019)	Position
Australian Jazz & Blues Albums (ARIA)	4

Chart (2020)	Position
Australian Jazz & Blues Albums (ARIA)	2
US Contemporary Jazz Albums (Billboard)	1

Chart (2021)	Position
Australian Jazz & Blues Albums (ARIA)	1
US Contemporary Jazz Albums (Billboard)	1

Chart (2022)	Position
Australian Jazz & Blues Albums (ARIA)	1
US Contemporary Jazz Albums (Billboard)	1

Chart (2023)	Position
Australian Jazz & Blues Albums (ARIA)	1
US Contemporary Jazz Albums (Billboard)	1

Chart (2024)	Position
Australian Jazz & Blues Albums (ARIA)	2
Belgian Albums (Ultratop Flanders)	173
US Contemporary Jazz Albums (Billboard)	1

Chart (2025)	Position
Australian Jazz & Blues Albums (ARIA)	5
US Contemporary Jazz Albums (Billboard)	1

=== Decade-end charts ===
Chart (2000–09)	Position
Australian Albums (ARIA)	4
UK Albums (OCC)	14
US Billboard 200	4
US Top Jazz Albums (Billboard)	1

== Certifications and sales ==
Certifications for Come Away with Me
Region	Certification	Certified units/sales
Argentina (CAPIF)	2× Platinum	80,000^{^}
Australia (ARIA)	11× Platinum	800,000
Austria (IFPI Austria)	2× Platinum	80,000^{*}
Belgium (BRMA)	2× Platinum	100,000^{*}
Brazil (Pro-Música Brasil)	Platinum	125,000^{*}
Canada (Music Canada)	Diamond	1,000,000^{^}
Denmark (IFPI Danmark)	12× Platinum	240,000^{‡}
France (SNEP)	Diamond	1,160,000
Germany (BVMI)	5× Gold	750,000^{^}
Greece (IFPI Greece)	Gold	15,000^{^}
Italy 2002-2004 sales	—	150,000
Italy (FIMI) sales since 2009	Platinum	50,000^{‡}
Japan (RIAJ)	2× Platinum	500,000^{^}
Netherlands (NVPI)	2× Platinum	160,000^{^}
New Zealand (RMNZ)	11× Platinum	165,000^{^}
Norway	—	55,000
Poland (ZPAV)	2× Platinum	80,000^{*}
Portugal (AFP)	2× Platinum	80,000^{^}
Russia (NFPF)	Gold	10,000^{*}
South Korea	—	73,214
Spain (Promusicae)	Platinum	100,000^{^}
Sweden (GLF)	Platinum	60,000^{^}
Switzerland (IFPI Switzerland)	3× Platinum	120,000^{^}
United Kingdom (BPI)	9× Platinum	2,700,000^{‡}
United States (RIAA)	12× Platinum	12,000,000^{‡}
Summaries
Europe (IFPI)	7× Platinum	7,000,000^{*}
^{*} Sales figures based on certification alone.^{^} Shipments figures based on certification alone.^{‡} Sales+streaming figures based on certification alone.

== Awards and honors ==
Grammy Awards

Year	Winner	Category
2003	Come Away with Me	Album of the Year
2003	Come Away with Me	Best Engineered Album, Non-Classical
2003	Come Away with Me	Best Pop Vocal Album

Japan Gold Disc Awards

Year	Winner	Category
2003	Come Away with Me	International Jazz Album of the Year

Rolling Stone ranked Come Away with Me at number 54 on its list of the 100 Best Albums of the Decade. Rhapsody ranked the album at 16 on its list of 100 Best Albums of the Decade, while Spinner listed the album at the 42nd Best Album of the 2000s.

== See also ==
- List of best-selling albums
- List of best-selling albums by women
- List of best-selling albums in the United States
- List of best-selling albums in Australia
- List of best-selling albums in New Zealand
- List of best-selling albums in the United Kingdom
