= Textile Building (Manhattan) =

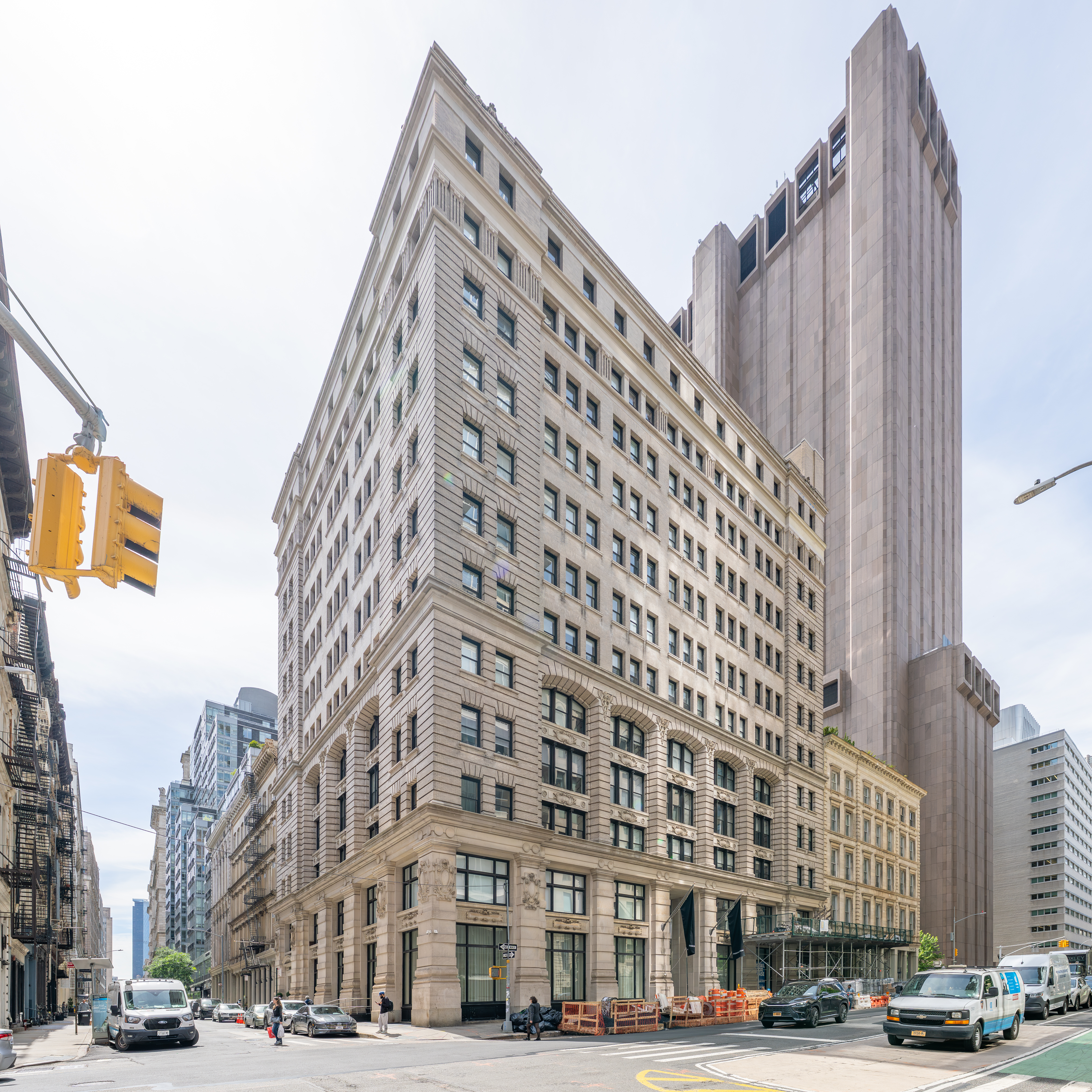
- Textile Building in 2026

General information
- Location: 239–245 Church Street, Manhattan, New York City
- Coordinates: 40°43′03″N 74°00′21″W
- Opened: 1900–1901

Design and construction
- Architect: Henry Janeway Hardenbergh
- Main contractor: George A. Fuller Co.

The Textile Building is a 14-story building at 66 Leonard Street and 239–245 Church Street in the Tribeca neighborhood of Manhattan, New York City.

== History ==
Neo-Renaissance in style, it was designed by Henry J. Hardenbergh, and built in 1900–01 by George A. Fuller Co. for the Importer's Building Company. The 12-story building was converted from office space into 47 condominiums in 1999 by developer Yitzchak Tessler to designs by Karl Fischer and Alan Ritchie, at which time a duplex penthouse was added. The common areas were designed by Jay Valgora of the Walker Group/CNI.

The building is part of the Tribeca East Historic District, which was designated by the New York City Landmarks Preservation Commission on December 8, 1992. The building was originally called the "Importer's Building" and typically contained the offices and showrooms of dry goods firms. It is decorated with mementos of the American textile industry. The building's facade is adorned with six representations of Caduceus, a winged staff entwined by a pair of snakes. There are also eight cartouches.

Chef Jean-Georges Vongerichten bought an apartment in the building in April 2001 for $2.62 million, which he then sold in 2004 to Hiromi Go, a Japanese pop star, for approximately $3.25 million.
