= Platinum Blue Music Intelligence =

Music Xray
- Website type: A&R
- Available in: English
- Owners: Mike McCready & investor consortium
- Website: Homepage
- Commercial: Yes
- Launched: 2009
- Current status: active

Music Xray is a music tech company based in New York City. The company's official name is Platinum Blue Music Intelligence Inc but it began operating under the name "Music Xray" in July 2009.

The company is billed as "an online platform where artists submit their songs to industry professionals". Its technology, Quant Metrics, and predictive analytics help industry talent hunters, songwriters and performers find each other. The tech tools allow good songs as measured by what industry executives tend to prefer, rise to the top. Musicians pay a fee to submit their music to industry professionals, often more than $10, in exchange for a guaranteed listen and response. Some professionals offer in-depth critiques. Others provide a simple selection or rejection notice. Musicians, songwriters, and fans can join the site for free. Professionals can join the site either by being invited by the company or through an application and approval process.

Music Xray's list of claimed success stories is found on their site.

The firm uses statistical software to analyze musical compositions. According to an article in The New Yorker, the firm claims to be able to predict hit songs with eighty-percent accuracy. After analysis, the firm sometimes offers broad suggestions for improvement of a song's chances to be offered a deal by the industry. Music Xray was founded by Mike McCready and Tracie Reed both formerly of Polyphonic HMI in Barcelona, Spain.

On June 5, 2010, the company launched a song to opportunity (S_{2}O) matching system that uses advanced music analysis software to alert musicians when their songs contain the musical characteristics that an industry professional is seeking.

== See also ==
- List of music software
