= Ian Spencer =

English cricketer

Ian Spencer (born 26 August 1984) is a former English cricketer. He was a right-handed batsman and wicket-keeper who played for Cheshire. He was born in Whiston.

Spencer, who appeared for Cheshire in the Minor Counties Championship between 2002 and 2004, made a single List A appearance for the side, during the C&G Trophy in August 2003, against Bedfordshire. He scored 3 runs from the tailend.

Spencer took three catches in the match from behind the stumps, including that of Shaun Young.
