= Turn Me On (Mark Dinning song) =

1961 song by John D. Loudermilk

Single by Norah Jones

from the album Come Away with Me
- Published: August 9, 1961
- Released: May 12, 2003
- Studio: Sorcerer Sound (New York City); Allaire (Shokan, New York)
- Genre: R&B; soul; blues
- Length: 2:34
- Label: Blue Note
- Songwriter: John D. Loudermilk
- Producers: Jay Newland; Norah Jones

Norah Jones singles chronology
| "Come Away with Me" (2002) | "Turn Me On" (2003) | "Don't Know Why" / "I'll Be Your Baby Tonight" (2003) |

Audio video
- "Turn Me On" on YouTube

"Turn Me On" is a song by John D. Loudermilk that was first recorded and released by Mark Dinning in 1961 as the B-side to his single "Lonely Island". Other notable versions are by Nellie Rutherford and Nina Simone. Norah Jones released her version as the last single from her debut album Come Away with Me on May 12, 2003. The song was also performed by Shelby Dressel during her American Idol audition.

== Influence ==
Musicologist Joe Hickerson suggested that "Turn Me On" influenced the composition of Leonard Cohen's 1969 song "Bird on the Wire".

== Norah Jones version ==
Jones's cover was the seventh track on her debut album. This version also appeared in the soundtrack of the movie Love Actually.

=== Charts ===
| Chart (2003–2004) | Peak position |
|---|---|
| Canada (Nielsen SoundScan) | 10 |
| France (SNEP) | 92 |

=== Certifications ===
| Region | Certification | Certified units/sales |
|---|---|---|
| New Zealand (RMNZ) | Platinum | 30,000^{‡} |
| Spain (Promusicae) | Gold | 30,000^{‡} |
| United Kingdom (BPI) | Silver | 200,000^{‡} |
| United States (RIAA) | Platinum | 1,000,000^{‡} |
^{‡} Sales+streaming figures based on certification alone.

== Release history ==
| Region | Date | Format(s) | Label(s) | Ref. |
|---|---|---|---|---|
| Europe | May 12, 2003 | CD | Blue Note; Capitol | |
| Europe | August 15, 2003 | Maxi-CD | Blue Note | |
| United States | October 6, 2003 | Smooth jazz; triple A radio | Blue Note | |
| United States | December 2, 2003 | CD | Blue Note | |
