= Mike McCready (businessman) =

American music entrepreneur

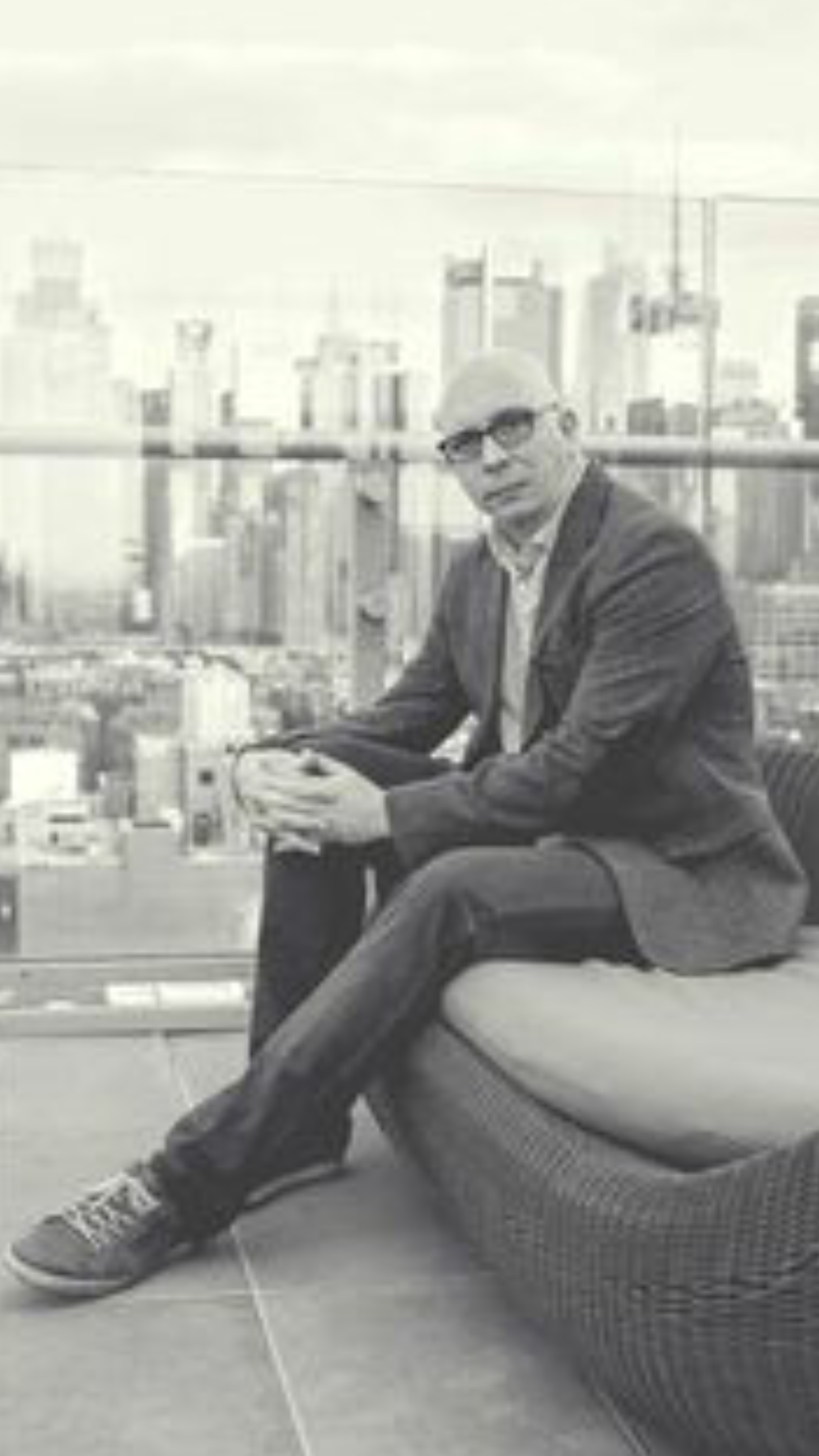
- Mike McCready in New York City in 2014
- Born: December 18, 1968 (age 57); Ord, Nebraska, U.S.
- Education: Broken Bow High School, Institut de Cardedeu
- Alma mater: Creighton University
- Occupations: Entrepreneur, musician
- Known for: Co-founding Polyphonic HMI, Music Xray
- Title: CEO of Music Xray
- Spouse: Eve Goldman (m. 2013)
- Website: www.mikemccready.com

Mike McCready (born December 18, 1968) is an American entrepreneur in the music industry, CEO of Music Xray, a blogger on Huffington Post and musician.

== Career ==
McCready is most known for having pioneered the science of hit song prediction known as Hit Song Science using acoustic analysis software to analyze the underlying mathematical patterns in music. The challenges his company faced in bringing the technology to market were later documented in a Harvard Business School case study penned by Anita Elberse titled Polyphonic HMI: Mixing Music and Math.

McCready's work with Hit Song Science worked its way briefly into the public consciousness in the first decade of the 2000s, earning him high-profile media attention including features in The New York Times Magazine, The Guardian, Le Monde, and a piece by Canadian journalist Malcolm Gladwell in The New Yorker. He was additionally included in several documentaries by National Geographic Television, Discovery Channel, ITV and Hit Song Science became the inspiration for the plot of an episode of the CBS drama Numb3rs. He was the subject of a supposed investment by one of the characters in Aaron Sorkin's short-lived series, Studio 60 on the Sunset Strip.

He started his career in Barcelona, Spain as a musician where he released one album under independent record label, DiscMedi, which garnered two charting songs performed in Catalan. Previously, he had pioneered a company that made clocks and watches depicting the way Catalans tell time. They caught on and the company achieved extensive regional media coverage, earning McCready local celebrity status as a creative entrepreneur - especially as a conflict with a larger watch maker erupted in the press over the intellectual property of the clocks. McCready persuaded Catalan celebrities to implicitly endorse his brand by creating their own dial designs which were sold as limited edition wrist watches, each one generating a new surge of media attention. The maneuver resulted in the larger watch maker over-extending itself and eventually closing its doors. The story was chronicled in 1996 in Success magazine.
