= Don't Know Why =

Song written and composed by Jesse Harris, popularized by Norah Jones

Single by Norah Jones

from the album Come Away with Me
- B-side: "Lonestar"; "Peace"; "Cold Cold Heart"; "I'll Be Your Baby Tonight"; "Crazy" (live)
- Released: January 28, 2002
- Studio: Sorcerer Sound (New York City); Allaire (Shokan, New York)
- Genre: Jazz pop
- Length: 3:06
- Label: Blue Note
- Songwriter: Jesse Harris
- Producers: Norah Jones; Arif Mardin; Jay Newland

Norah Jones singles chronology
"Don't Know Why" (2002)	"Feelin' the Same Way" (2002)
"Turn Me On" (2003)	"Don't Know Why" / "I'll Be Your Baby Tonight" (2003)	"Sunrise" (2004)

Alternative cover
- Cover art for "Don't Know Why" / "I'll Be Your Baby Tonight"

Audio sample
- file; help

Music video
- "Don't Know Why" on YouTube

"Don't Know Why" is a song written and composed by American singer-songwriter Jesse Harris that originally appeared on his 1999 album, Jesse Harris & the Ferdinandos. A cover of the song later appeared on Norah Jones' debut studio album, Come Away with Me (2002), and was released as her debut single on January 28, 2002.

Jones' version of "Don't Know Why" peaked at number 30 on the US Billboard Hot 100 and was a critical success, winning three Grammy Awards in 2003 for Record of the Year, Song of the Year, and Best Female Pop Vocal Performance at the 45th Annual Grammy Awards. "Don't Know Why" was also successful abroad, reaching number five in Australia, number six in Croatia, and number 24 in New Zealand. The song was ranked number 459 in Blender magazine's "500 Greatest Songs Since You Were Born".

Jones' piano-playing has been compared to that of Floyd Cramer, having a "style and grace, a musical maturity not found in many keyboard players today."

== Music video ==
A music video directed by Anastasia Simone and Ian Spencer was filmed in February 2002 and released later that year. It features Norah Jones performing the song on a gray beach at sunrise, on a rocky pier, and at a beach rental stand accompanied by a wooden piano while undersea images are projected onto the walls.

== Track listings ==
UK CD single

1. "Don't Know Why" – 3:05
2. "Lonestar" – 3:05
3. "Peace" – 3:51

Dutch CD single

1. "Don't Know Why" – 3:05
2. "Cold Cold Heart" – 3:38

French CD single

1. "Don't Know Why" – 3:05
2. "Lonestar" – 3:07

Australian CD single

1. "Don't Know Why"
2. "I'll Be Your Baby Tonight"
3. "Lonestar"
4. "Peace"

UK CD single (2003)

1. "Don't Know Why" – 3:05
2. "I'll Be Your Baby Tonight" – 3:16
3. "Crazy" (live) – 3:29

== Credits and personnel ==
Credits are lifted from the Come Away with Me album booklet.

Recording

- Recorded at Sorcerer Sound (New York City) and Allaire Studios (Shokan, New York)
- Mixed at Sear Sound (New York City)
- Mastered at Sterling Sound (New York City)

Personnel

- Jesse Harris – writing, acoustic guitar, electric guitar
- Norah Jones – vocals, piano, production
- Lee Alexander – bass guitar
- Dan Rieser – drums
- Arif Mardin – production, mixing
- Jay Newland – production, mixing, engineering
- Mark Birkey – assistant engineering
- Ted Jensen – mastering

== Charts ==
=== Weekly charts ===
2002–2003 weekly chart performance for "Don't Know Why"
Chart (2002–2003)	Peak position
Australia (ARIA)	5
Austria (Ö3 Austria Top 40)	56
Croatia (HRT)	6
France (SNEP)	74
Germany (GfK)	82
Netherlands (Single Top 100)	86
New Zealand (Recorded Music NZ)	24
Scottish Singles Sales (Official Charts)	71
Scottish Singles Sales (Official Charts) with "I'll Be Your Baby Tonight"	78
UK Singles (Official Charts)	59
UK Singles (Official Charts) with "I'll Be Your Baby Tonight"	63
US Billboard Hot 100	30
US Adult Alternative Airplay (Billboard)	5
US Adult Contemporary (Billboard)	4
US Adult Pop Airplay (Billboard)	8
US Pop Airplay (Billboard)	32

2022 weekly chart performance for "Don't Know Why"
Chart (2022)	Peak position
Japan Hot Overseas (Billboard Japan)	20

=== Year-end charts ===
2002 year-end chart performance for "Don't Know Why"
Chart (2002)	Position
US Adult Contemporary (Billboard)	38
US Adult Top 40 (Billboard)	25
US Triple-A (Billboard)	5

2003 year-end chart performance for "Don't Know Why"
Chart (2003)	Position
Australia (ARIA)	77
US Billboard Hot 100	97
US Adult Contemporary (Billboard)	7
US Adult Top 40 (Billboard)	25

2012 year-end chart performance for "Don't Know Why"
Chart (2012)	Position
South Korea Foreign (Circle)	98

2013 year-end chart performance for "Don't Know Why"
Chart (2013)	Position
South Korea Foreign (Circle)	80

== Certifications ==
Certifications and sales for "Don't Know Why"
Region	Certification	Certified units/sales
Australia (ARIA)	Platinum	70,000^{‡}
Denmark (IFPI Danmark)	Gold	45,000^{‡}
Italy (FIMI) sales since 2009	Platinum	70,000^{‡}
New Zealand (RMNZ)	2× Platinum	60,000^{‡}
South Korea (Gaon)	—	582,355
Spain (Promusicae)	Platinum	60,000^{‡}
United Kingdom (BPI) with "I'll Be Your Baby Tonight"	Gold	400,000^{‡}
United States (RIAA)	3× Platinum	3,000,000^{‡}
^{‡} Sales+streaming figures based on certification alone.

== Release history ==
Release dates and formats for "Don't Know Why"
Region	Date	Format(s)	Label(s)	Ref.
United States	January 28, 2002	Triple A radio	Blue Note	
United Kingdom	May 13, 2002	CD	Parlophone	
United States	June 24, 2002	Hot adult contemporary radio	Blue Note	
United States	August 5, 2002	Contemporary hit radio	Blue Note	
Australia	February 24, 2003	CD	Parlophone	
United Kingdom (re-release)	September 1, 2003	CD	Parlophone	
