= Polyphonic HMI =

- Industry: Music Analysis
- Founder: Grupo AIA; Mike McCready
- Headquarters: Barcelona, Spain
- Products: Hit Song Science

Polyphonic HMI is a music analysis company jointly founded in Barcelona, Spain by Mike McCready and an artificial intelligence firm called Grupo AIA. Its principal product is called "Hit Song Science" (HSS) which uses various statistical and signal processing techniques to help record companies predict whether a particular song will have commercial success.

The software correctly predicted the success of Norah Jones' debut album Come Away with Me months before it topped the charts, contradicting skeptical studio executives.

== Bibliography ==
- Vernallis, Carol; Herzog, Amy; Richardson, John (2015). The Oxford Handbook of Sound and Image in Digital Media. Oxford University Press. ISBN 978-0-19-025817-7.
