= Come Away with Me (song) =

2002 single by Norah Jones

Single by Norah Jones

from the album Come Away with Me
- B-side: "Turn Me On" (live); "Cold, Cold Heart" (live); "Feelin' the Same Way"
- Released: September 30, 2002
- Studio: Sorcerer Sound (New York City)
- Genre: Country
- Length: 3:18
- Label: Blue Note
- Songwriter: Norah Jones
- Producer: Arif Mardin

Norah Jones singles chronology
"Feelin' the Same Way" (2002)	"Come Away with Me" (2002)	"Turn Me On" (2003)

Music video
- "Come Away With Me" on YouTube

"Come Away with Me" is a song written and performed by American recording artist Norah Jones. The ballad was released on September 30, 2002, as the third single from her debut studio album, Come Away with Me (2002).

The song reached number 21 on the US Billboard Adult Top 40 and number two in Canada. It also peaked at number five in Spain and number 80 in the United Kingdom. "Come Away with Me" was included on the soundtrack for the film Maid in Manhattan (2002).

== Music video ==
The music video of the song was directed by James Frost and shows Norah driving a car in a California desert. The video was released in 2003.

== Track listings ==
Canadian and UK CD single

1. "Come Away with Me" – 3:18
2. "Turn Me On" (live) – 5:08
3. "Cold, Cold Heart" (live) – 4:39
- Both live tracks were recorded at the House of Blues, Chicago, on April 16, 2002

European CD single

1. "Come Away with Me" – 3:18
2. "Feelin' the Same Way" – 2:55

== Credits and personnel ==
Credits are lifted from the UK CD single and the Come Away with Me album booklet.

Studios

- Recorded at Sorcerer Sound (New York City)
- Mixed at Sear Sound (New York City)
- Mastered at Sterling Sound (New York City)

Personnel

- Norah Jones – writing, vocals, piano
- Jesse Harris – acoustic guitar
- Adam Levy – electric guitar
- Lee Alexander – bass
- Dan Rieser – drums
- Arif Mardin – production, mixing
- Jay Newland – engineering, mixing
- Dick Kondas – assistant engineering
- Ted Jensen – mastering

== Charts ==
=== Weekly charts ===
Weekly chart performance for "Come Away with Me"
Chart (2002–2003)	Peak position
Canada (Nielsen SoundScan)	2
France (SNEP)	97
Netherlands (Single Top 100)	87
Scotland Singles (OCC)	76
Spain (Promusicae)	5
UK Singles (OCC)	80
US Adult Alternative Airplay (Billboard)	12
US Adult Pop Airplay (Billboard)	21

=== Year-end charts ===
Year-end chart performance for "Come Away with Me"
Chart (2002)	Position
Canada (Nielsen SoundScan)	63

Chart (2003)	Position
US Adult Top 40 (Billboard)	42
US Triple-A (Billboard)	45

== Certifications ==
Certifications and sales for "Come Away with Me"
Region	Certification	Certified units/sales
Denmark (IFPI Danmark)	Platinum	90,000^{‡}
Italy (FIMI)	Gold	25,000^{‡}
New Zealand (RMNZ)	2× Platinum	60,000^{‡}
Spain (Promusicae)	Platinum	60,000^{‡}
United Kingdom (BPI)	Platinum	600,000^{‡}
United States (RIAA)	2× Platinum	2,000,000^{‡}
^{‡} Sales+streaming figures based on certification alone.

== Release history ==
Release dates and formats for "Come Away with Me"
Region	Date	Format(s)	Label(s)	Ref.
United States	September 30, 2002	Smooth jazz; triple A radio	Blue Note	
United Kingdom	October 7, 2002	CD	Blue Note; Parlophone	
United States	March 3, 2003	Hot adult contemporary radio	Blue Note	
