= List of awards and nominations received by Norah Jones =

Norah Jones awards and nominations
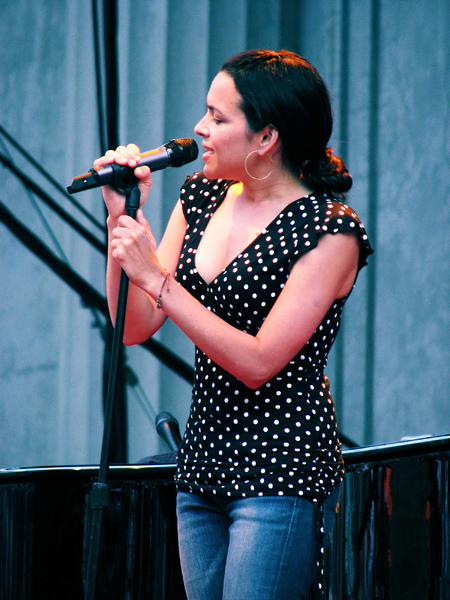
- Jones performing at the Hearst Greek Theatre in Berkeley, California on June 23, 2007
Awards and nominations
Award	Wins	Nominations
American Music Awards	0	5
Billboard	5	8
Brit	1	4
Grammy	10	20
Teen Choice	0	1
World Music	4	4

Totals (Note: Certain award groups do not simply award one winner. They acknowledge several different recipients, have runners-up, and have third place. Since this is a specific recognition and is different from losing an award, runner-up mentions are considered wins in this award tally. For simplification and to avoid errors, each award in this list has been presumed to have had a prior nomination.)
- Wins: 33
- Nominations: 68

Norah Jones is an American singer, songwriter, and pianist of Anglo-American and Bengali descent. She is the daughter of Indian sitar player Ravi Shankar and half-sister of sitarist Anoushka Shankar. Jones' career was launched with her 2002 debut album Come Away with Me, an acoustic pop album that sold over twenty million copies worldwide. Her second album Feels like Home was released in 2004 with more than a million sales in the first week of its United States release. In 2007, she released her third album Not Too Late which debuted at number one on several national music charts. She has become one of the most successful recording artists of the decade, with sales of more than 17 million units in the United States and 39 million units worldwide.

She has been the recipient of several Grammy Awards; Come Away with Me was nominated for three awards at the 45th Grammy Awards. Jones personally received five of the eight awards for Come Away with Me. She also received three awards at the 47th Grammy Awards, including "Record of the Year" and "Best Pop Collaboration with Vocals" for her work with Ray Charles on the song "Here We Go Again". She received her eighth Grammy for "Best Female Pop Vocal Performance" for her song "Sunrise".

== Abilu Music Awards ==
Year	Nominee / work	Award	Result	Ref.
2016	Day Breaks	International Jazz Album of the Year	Won	

== American Music Awards ==
The American Music Awards are awarded for outstanding achievements in the record industry. Jones has received seven nominations.

Year	Nominee / work	Award	Result
2003 (November)	Norah Jones	Favorite Adult Contemporary Artist	Nominated
2003 (November)	Come Away With Me	Favorite Pop/Rock Album	Nominated
2004	Norah Jones	Artist of the Year	Nominated
2004	Norah Jones	Favorite Adult Contemporary Artist	Nominated
2004	Feels Like Home	Favorite Pop/Rock Album	Nominated
2007	Norah Jones	Artist of the Year	Nominated
2007	Norah Jones	Favorite Adult Contemporary Artist	Nominated

== Billboard Music Awards ==
The Billboard Music Awards are sponsored by Billboard magazine and is held annually in December. Jones has received eight nominations.

Year	Nominee / work	Award	Result
2003	Come Away With Me	Top Internet Album	Won
2003	Norah Jones	Top Billboard 200 Album Artist - Female	Won
2004	Norah Jones	Top Billboard 200 Album Artist - Female	Won
2004	Norah Jones	Top Internet Album Artist	Won
2004	Norah Jones	Female Artist of the Year	Nominated
2004	Norah Jones	Top Billboard 200 Album Artist	Nominated
2004	Feels Like Home	Top Internet Album	Won
2004	Feels Like Home	Top Billboard 200 Album	Nominated

Billboard Japan Music Awards

Year	Recipient	Award	Result	Ref.
2012	Norah Jones	Jazz Artist of the Year	Won	
2012	"Happy Pills"	Adult Contemporary Airplay	Won	

== Brit Awards ==
The Brit Awards are the British Phonographic Industry's annual pop music awards. Jones has received four nominations.

Year	Nominee / work	Award	Result
2003	Come Away With Me	International Album	Nominated
2003	Norah Jones	International Breakthrough Act	Won
2003	Norah Jones	International Female Solo Artist	Nominated
2010	Norah Jones	International Female Solo Artist	Nominated

== GAFFA Awards ==
=== Denmark GAFFA Awards ===
Delivered since 1991, the GAFFA Awards are a Danish award that rewards popular music by the magazine of the same name.

Year	Nominee / work	Award	Result	Ref.
2002	Herself	Best Foreign New Act	Nominated	

== Grammy Awards ==
The Grammy Awards are awarded annually by the National Academy of Recording Arts and Sciences. Jones has received ten awards from twenty nominations, including Album of the Year (twice), Record of the Year (twice) and Best New Artist.

Year	Nominee / work	Award	Result
2003	Norah Jones	Best New Artist	Won
2003	Come Away with Me	Album of the Year	Won
2003	Come Away with Me	Best Pop Vocal Album	Won
2003	"Don't Know Why"	Record of the Year	Won
2003	"Don't Know Why"	Best Female Pop Vocal Performance	Won
2004	"Wurlitzer Prize (I Don't Want To Get Over You)" (with Willie Nelson)	Best Country Collaboration with Vocals	Nominated
2005	"Here We Go Again" (with Ray Charles)	Record of the Year	Won
2005	"Here We Go Again" (with Ray Charles)	Best Pop Collaboration with Vocals	Won
2005	"Sunrise"	Best Female Pop Vocal Performance	Won
2005	Feels Like Home	Best Pop Vocal Album	Nominated
2005	"Creepin' In" (with Dolly Parton)	Best Country Collaboration with Vocals	Nominated
2006	"Virginia Moon" (with Foo Fighters)	Best Pop Collaboration with Vocals	Nominated
2006	"Dreams Come True" (with Willie Nelson)	Best Country Collaboration with Vocals	Nominated
2008	River: The Joni Letters (featured Artist)	Album of the Year	Won
2010	"Baby, It's Cold Outside" (with Willie Nelson)	Best Pop Collaboration with Vocals	Nominated
2011	"Chasing Pirates"	Best Female Pop Vocal Performance	Nominated
2021	"I'll Be Gone"	Best American Roots Performance	Nominated
2022	'Til We Meet Again (Live)	Best Traditional Pop Vocal Album	Nominated
2023	I Dream of Christmas	Best Traditional Pop Vocal Album	Nominated
2025	Visions	Best Traditional Pop Vocal Album	Won

== Italian Music Awards ==
The Italian Music Awards were an accolade established in 2001 by the Federazione Industria Musicale Italiana to recognize the achievements in the Italian Music industry both by domestic and international artists.

Year	Nominee / work	Award	Result
2002	Norah Jones	Best International Female Artist	Nominated
2002	Norah Jones	Best International Revelation of the Year	Won

== Japan Gold Disc Awards ==
The Japan Gold Disc Awards are an annual ceremony hosted in Japan. The winner are based by sales provided by The Recording Industry Association of Japan (RIAJ).

Year	Recipient	Award	Result	Ref.
2003	Come Away with Me	International Jazz Album of the Year	Won	
2005	Feels Like Home	International Jazz Album of the Year	Won	
2008	Not Too Late	International Jazz Album of the Year	Won	
2010	The Fall	Jazz Album of the Year	Won	
2012	… Featuring Norah Jones	Jazz Album of the Year	Won	
2013	Little Broken Hearts	Jazz Album of the Year	Won	

== Juno Awards ==
Year	Nominated work	Award	Result
2004	"Feels Like Home"	International Album of the Year	Nominated

== MTV Immies ==
Year	Nominee / work	Award	Result	Ref.
2003	Norah Jones	Best Female Pop Act - Solo / Duo / Group	Won	
2003	Norah Jones	Best Debut	Won	

== MTV Video Music Awards ==
An MTV Video Music Award (commonly abbreviated as a VMA), is an award presented by the cable channel MTV to honor the best in music videos. Originally conceived as an alternative to the Grammy Awards.

Year	Nominated work	Award	Result
2002	Don't Know Why	MTV2 Award	Nominated

== Music Video Production Awards ==
The MVPA Awards are annually presented by a Los Angeles-based music trade organization to honor the year's best music videos.

Ref.
Year	Nominated work	Award	Result	Ref.
2003	"Don't Know Why"	Adult Contemporary Video of the Year	Nominated	

== NRJ Music Awards ==
Year	Nominee / work	Award	Result
2004	Norah Jones	International New Artist of the Year	Nominated

== Pop Awards ==
Pop Magazine is an online music magazine created by Hotspot Entertainment and published by A-Z Publishings. The magazine was launched on April 24, 2014. In 2018, Pop Magazine launched the first annual Pop Awards with 25 nominees across 5 categories.

Year	Nominee / work	Award	Result
2021	Herself	Female Artist of the Year	Nominated

== Teen Choice Awards ==
The Teen Choice Awards is an awards show presented annually by the Fox Broadcasting Company. Jones has received three nominations.

Year	Nominee / work	Award	Result	Ref.
2003	Norah Jones	Choice Female Artist	Nominated	
2003	Norah Jones	Choice Breakout Music Artist	Nominated	
2003	"Come Away with Me"	Choice Love Song	Nominated	

== The Asian Awards ==
The Asian Awards are the world's only pan-Asian pan-sector awards ceremony.

Year	Nominee / work	Award	Result
2014	Norah Jones	Outstanding Achievement in Music	Won

== World Music Awards ==
The international World Music Awards honors recording artists based on worldwide sales figures provided by the International Federation of the Phonographic Industry. Jones has received four awards from four nominations.

Year	Nominee / work	Award	Result
2003	Norah Jones	Best Selling Female Pop Artist of the Year	Won
2003	Norah Jones	Best Selling Contemporary Artist of the Year	Won
2004	Norah Jones	Best Selling Female Artist of the Year	Won
2004	Norah Jones	Best Selling Jazz Artist of the Year	Won

== Žebřík Music Awards ==
Year	Nominee / work	Award	Result	Ref.
2002	Norah Jones	Best International Surprise	Nominated	
2003	Norah Jones	Best International Female	Nominated	
2004	Norah Jones	Best International Female	Nominated	
2005	Norah Jones	Best International Female	Nominated	
