= Fry Street =

Fry Street may refer to:

- Fry Street, Historic Fry Street area of Denton, Texas
  - Fry Street Fair
  - Fry Street Fire, Denton Texas
- Fry Street, Chicago, venue of the Fry Street Quartet
- Fry Street Pioneer Burial Ground in Grafton, New South Wales
