= African Flower =

Jazz composition by Duke Ellington

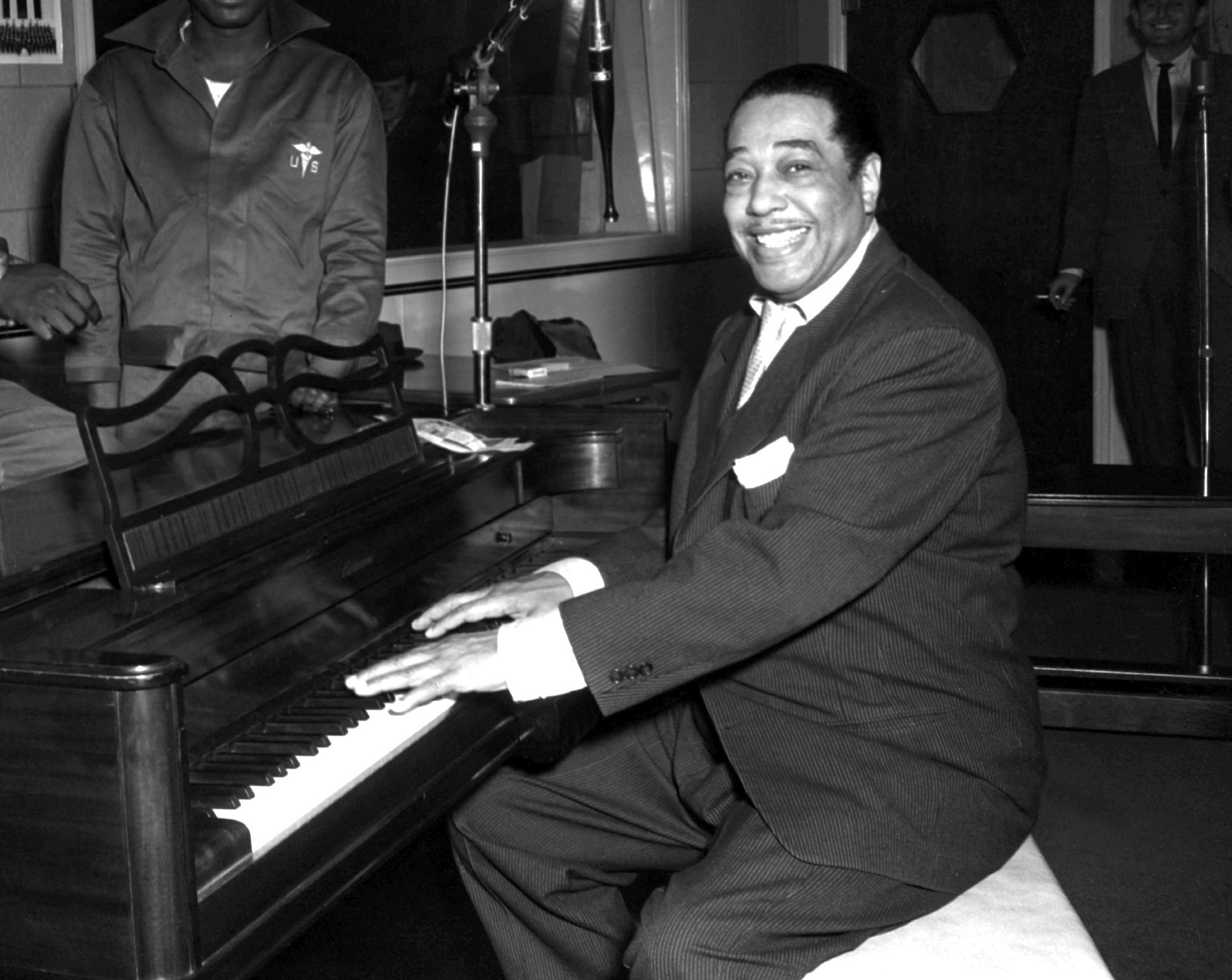
Ellington poses with his piano at the KFG Radio Studio on November 3, 1954

"African Flower" or "Little African Flower" (Petite Fleur Africaine) is a composition by jazz pianist and composer Duke Ellington. He first recorded it for his 1962 LP Money Jungle. Ellington originally named it "La Plus Belle Africaine" when he composed it for the Negro Arts Festival in Dakar. He can be heard playing it at The English Concert in 1970. He recorded it with Max Roach and Charles Mingus as "Le Fleurs Africaine". Writer Peter Lavezzoli calls it "a masterpiece of simplicity and grandeur. Norah Jones recorded it for her 2016 album Day Breaks.

== Composition ==
According to Janna Tull Steed, the composition was the result of Ellington's "imaginary vision of a beautiful flower blooming "only for God" in the heart". "African Flower" is composed in the key of E♭ minor, and consists of cascading sequences, with an E♭ minor 7, A♭ minor 7, G♭ minor 7, E♭-minor 7, B♭ minor 7 flat 5 progression. It is the very first entry in Volume One of the Real Book, the original fakebook which appeared in the 1970s but has been brought up to date and made legal. Scott Saul says of the recording with Mingus and Roach: "Mingus spirals down the bass clef to create a stirring contrapuntal line that evenly balances the stateliness of Ellington's theme."
