= Begin Again (Norah Jones album) =

Compilation album by Norah Jones
- Released: April 12, 2019
- Recorded: 2018–2019
- Genre: Pop
- Length: 28:53
- Label: Blue Note
- Producers: Thomas Bartlett, Jeff Tweedy, Norah Jones

Norah Jones chronology
Live at Ronnie Scott's (2018)	Begin Again (2019)	Pick Me Up Off the Floor (2020)

Begin Again is a compilation album by American singer-songwriter Norah Jones, released through Blue Note Records on April 12, 2019. The collection is a compilation of singles Jones recorded from 2018 to 2019, and includes collaborations with Jeff Tweedy and Thomas Bartlett. Jones planned to tour Australia and the US in support of the album, before the COVID-19 pandemic.

== Background and recording ==
Jones said of the album that she wanted to record different things, in particular songs that were "quick and fun and easy and low-pressure", including collaborations with musicians that took no more than three days in the studio. She did not want to plan ahead aside from voice memo ideas, but to "create in the moment".

== Critical reception ==
Professional ratings
Aggregate scores
Source	Rating
Metacritic	70/100
Review scores
Source	Rating

Begin Again has a score of 70 out of 100 from Metacritic based on 5 reviews. On the music blog Idolator Mike Wass calls the musicians involved in the album and the outcome "eclectic", concluding that "the resulting songs are some of the most inventive of her career." Gabriel Fine wrote in his album review for Consequence of Sound that "there is something thrillingly free about the songs on Begin Again. They resist simple categorization and are experimental in the sense that they embody an unabashed confluence of Jones’ many musical inspirations", and sees that "much of the propulsion on the record comes from Jones’ personnel, who she manages to brilliantly highlight without losing her creative reigns."

== Track listing ==
No.	Title	Writer(s)	Producer(s)	Length
1.	"My Heart Is Full"	Norah Jones, Thomas Bartlett	Bartlett	3:06
2.	"Begin Again"	Jones, Emily Fiskio	Jones	3:50
3.	"It Was You"	Jones	Jones	5:30
4.	"A Song with No Name"	Jones, Jeff Tweedy	Tweedy	4:03
5.	"Uh Oh"	Jones, Bartlett	Bartlett	3:36
6.	"Wintertime"	Jones, Tweedy	Tweedy	3:48
7.	"Just a Little Bit"	Jones, Sarah Oda, Brian Blade, Christopher Thomas	Jones	5:02
Total length:				28:53

=== Personnel ===
- Norah Jones - vocals, piano (tracks 2–7), acoustic guitar and celesta (4), Rhodes electric piano and drums (5), electric organ (7)
- Thomas Bartlett - keyboards, piano and OP-1 synthesizer (1, 5), drum programming (5)
- Jeff Tweedy - electric guitar (4, 6), acoustic guitar (4), electric bass (6)
- Pete Remm - Hammond B3 organ (2, 3)
- Christopher Thomas - bass (2, 3, 7)
- Brian Blade - drums (2, 3, 7)
- Leon Michels - tenor saxophone (3, 7)
- Dave Guy - trumpet (3, 7)
- Spencer Tweedy - drums (6)

Technical

- Thomas Bartlett - recording (1, 5)
- Patrick Dillett - recording (2, 3, 7), mixing (1, 5, 7)
- Andy Taub and Jens Jungkurth - recording (3)
- James Yost - recording assistant (2, 3, 7)
- Genevieve Nelson - recording assistant (3)
- Tom Schick - recording and mixing (4, 6)
- Mark Greenberg - recording assistant (4, 6)
- Homer Steinweiss - recording of horns (7)
- Tom Elmhirst - mixing (2, 3)
- Brandon Bost - mixing engineer (2, 3)
- Chris Gehringer - mastering
- Will Quinnell - mastering assistant
- Frank Harkins - art direction, design
- Clay Patrick McBride - photography

== Charts ==
Chart (2019)	Peak position
Australian Albums (ARIA)	14
Austrian Albums (Ö3 Austria)	31
Belgian Albums (Ultratop Flanders)	29
Belgian Albums (Ultratop Wallonia)	25
Czech Albums (ČNS IFPI)	51
Dutch Albums (Album Top 100)	50
French Albums (SNEP)	42
German Albums (Offizielle Top 100)	35
Hungarian Albums (MAHASZ)	34
Japan Hot Albums (Billboard Japan)	28
Japanese Albums (Oricon)	18
New Zealand Albums (RMNZ)	21
Polish Albums (ZPAV)	47
Scottish Albums (Official Charts)	50
South Korean Albums (Gaon)	84
Spanish Albums (PROMUSICAE)	30
Swiss Albums (Schweizer Hitparade)	11
US Billboard 200	164
