= Little Broken Hearts Tour =

2012–13 concert tour by Norah Jones

- Tour by Norah Jones
- Associated album: Little Broken Hearts
- Start date: 25 May 2012
- End date: 8 March 2013
- Legs: 9
- No. of shows: 81

Norah Jones concert chronology
- The Fall Tour (2010); Little Broken Hearts Tour (2012–13); Daybreaks World Tour (2016–17)

The Little Broken Hearts Tour was the fifth world tour by American singer-songwriter Norah Jones.

== Support acts ==
- Sarah Jaffe
- Jim Campilongo Electric Trio
- The Candles
- Cory Chisel and The Wandering Sons
- Richard Julian
- Jesse Harris (South America)

== Setlist ==
1. "Good Morning"
2. "Take It Back"
3. "Say Goodbye"
4. "Little Broken Hearts"
5. "She's 22"
6. "Even Though"
7. "Chasing Pirates"
8. "All a Dream"
9. "It Must Have Been the Roses (Grateful Dead)"
10. "Black"
11. "Miriam"
12. "Man of the Hour"
13. "Don’t Know Why"
14. "Sinkin’ Soon"
15. "Happy Pills"
16. "Stuck"
17. "Come Away with Me"

Encore

18. "Creepin' In"
19. "How Many Times Have You Broken My Heart"

== Tour dates ==
Date	City	Country	Venue
Europe
May 25, 2012	Paris	France	Olympia Theater
May 26, 2012	Frankfurt	Germany	Alte Oper
June 1, 2012	London	England	Royal Festival Hall
June 2, 2012	London	England	Royal Festival Hall
North America
June 20, 2012	Indianapolis	United States	Murat Theater
June 22, 2012	Memphis	United States	Mud Island Amphitheater
June 23, 2012	Atlanta	United States	Fox Theater
June 24, 2012	Nashville	United States	Ryman Auditorium
June 27, 2012	Vienna	United States	Wolf Trap
June 28, 2012	Philadelphia	United States	Mann Center
June 29, 2012	Rochester	United States	Kodak Hall
July 1, 2012	Boston	United States	Bank of America Pavilion
July 2, 2012	Wallingford	United States	Oakdale Theatre
July 3, 2012	New York City	United States	Central Park SummerStage
July 6, 2012	Toronto	Canada	Massey Hall
July 7, 2012	Montreal	Canada	Montreal Jazz Festival
Europe
July 14, 2012	Lucca	Italy	Lucca Festival
July 16, 2012	Luxembourg City	Luxembourg	Neumünster Abbey
July 17, 2012	Hamburg	Germany	Hamburg Stadtpark
July 19, 2012	Rättvik	Sweden	Dalhalla
July 20, 2012	Molde	Norway	Moldejazz
July 22, 2012	Pori	Finland	Pori Jazz
North America
August 7, 2012	Santa Barbara	United States	Santa Barbara Bowl
August 8, 2012	San Diego	United States	Copley Symphony Hall
August 10, 2012	Los Angeles	United States	Hollywood Bowl
August 12, 2012	Lake Tahoe	United States	Harveys Outdoor Arena
August 15, 2012	Bend	United States	Les Schwab Amphitheater
August 17, 2012	Troutdale	United States	Edgefield Winery
August 18, 2012	Redmond	United States	Marymoor Amphitheater
August 19, 2012	Boise	United States	Idaho Botanical Garden
August 21, 2012	Salt Lake City	United States	Red Butte Garden
August 23, 2012	Morrison	United States	Red Rocks Amphitheatre
Europe
September 6, 2012	Belfast	Northern Ireland	Waterfront Hall
September 7, 2012	Dublin	Ireland	Grand Canal Theatre
September 12, 2012	Brussels	Belgium	Forest National
September 13, 2012	Strasbourg	France	Zénith de Strasbourg
September 14, 2012	Paris	France	Festival We Love Green
September 17, 2012	Rome	Italy	Sala Santa Cecilia
September 18, 2012	Milan	Italy	Teatro degli Arcimboldi
September 20, 2012	Barcelona	Spain	L'Auditori
September 22, 2012	Lisbon	Portugal	Campo Pequeno
September 23, 2012	Madrid	Spain	Palacio de Congresos
North America
October 7, 2012	Minneapolis	United States	Orpheum Theatre
October 8, 2012	Milwaukee	United States	Riverside Theater
October 9, 2012	Chicago	United States	Chicago Theatre
October 11, 2012	Des Moines	United States	Civic Center
October 12, 2012	Omaha	United States	Orpheum Theatre
October 13, 2012	Kansas City	United States	Midland Theatre
October 15, 2012	St. Louis	United States	Peabody Opera House
October 16, 2012	Tulsa	United States	Brady Theater
October 19, 2012	Austin	United States	ACL Moody Theater
October 20, 2012	Houston	United States	Bayou Music Center
October 22, 2012	Dallas	United States	McFarlin Memorial Auditorium
October 23, 2012	New Orleans	United States	Mahalia Jackson Theater
Asia
November 4, 2012	Nagoya	Japan	Aichi Prefectural Gymnasium
November 5, 2012	Osaka	Japan	Osaka International Convention Center
November 6, 2012	Kanazawa	Japan	Honda no Mori Hall
November 8, 2012	Tokyo	Japan	Nippon Budokan
November 9, 2012	Tokyo	Japan	Nippon Budokan
November 10, 2012	Osaka	Japan	Umeda Arts Theater
November 12, 2012	Hiroshima	Japan	Shi Bunkakoryo Kaikan
November 14, 2012	Sapporo	Japan	Nitori Bunka Hall
November 17, 2012	Seoul	South Korea	Chamsil Gymnasium
South America
November 30, 2012	Bogotá	Colombia	Multiparque
December 2, 2012	Lima	Peru	CC Maria Angola
December 4, 2012	Santiago	Chile	Movistar Arena
December 7, 2012	Montevideo	Uruguay	Teatro de Verano
December 8, 2012	Buenos Aires	Argentina	Luna Park
December 9, 2012	Buenos Aires	Argentina	Luna Park
Oceania
February 13, 2013	Perth	Australia	Riverside Theatre
February 15, 2013	Sydney	Australia	State Theatre
February 16, 2013	Sydney	Australia	State Theatre
February 17, 2013	Sydney	Australia	State Theatre
February 19, 2013	Brisbane	Australia	Brisbane Convention Center
February 21, 2013	Melbourne	Australia	The Plenary
February 22, 2013	Adelaide	Australia	Festival Theatre
Asia
February 27, 2013	Singapore		The Star Performing Arts Centre
March 3, 2013	Mumbai	India	Summer's Day Festival
March 5, 2013	New Delhi	India	Siri Fort Auditorium
March 6, 2013	New Delhi	India	Siri Fort Auditorium
March 8, 2013	Bangalore	India	NICE Grounds, Bangalore International Exhibition Center

Cancellations and rescheduled shows

December 12, 2012	Porto Alegre, Brazil	Teatro Araujo Vianna	Cancelled
December 15, 2012	São Paulo, Brazil	Via Funchal	Cancelled
December 16, 2012	Rio de Janeiro, Brazil	Vivo Rio	Cancelled
February 24, 2013	Perth, Australia	Riverside Theatre	Rescheduled for February 13, 2013.

=== Box office score data ===
Venue	City	Tickets sold / available	Gross revenue
Murat Theatre	Indianapolis	2,237 / 2,237 (100%)	$113,043
Mud Island Amphitheater	Memphis	2,819 / 3,300 (85%)	$133,058
Fox Theatre	Atlanta	4,559 / 4,559 (100%)	$249,384
Ryman Auditorium	Nashville	2,362 / 2,362 (100%)	$133,246
Mann Center	Philadelphia	4,064 / 6,890 (59%)	$209,334
Santa Barbara Bowl	Santa Barbara	3,837 / 4,562 (84%)	$219,729
Harveys Outdoor Arena	Lake Tahoe	4,517 / 5,000 (90%)	$214,533
Idaho Botanical Garden	Boise	3,573 / 3,573 (100%)	$192,510
Chicago Theatre	Chicago	3,401 / 3,401 (100%)	$203,450
Civic Center	Des Moines	2,441 / 2,441 (100%)	$134,092
Orpheum Theatre	Omaha	2,560 / 2,560 (100%)	$138,603
Midland Theatre	Kansas City	2,110 / 2,110 (100%)	$116,702
Peabody Opera House	St. Louis	2,905 / 2,905 (100%)	$156,959
Brady Theatre	Tulsa	2,542 / 2,542 (100%)	$142,945
ACL Moody Theater	Austin	2,550 / 2,550 (100%)	$141,198
Bayou Music Center	Houston	2,871 / 2,871 (100%)	$158,425
McFarlin Memorial Auditorium	Dallas	2,377 / 2,377 (100%)	$129,318
Mahalia Jackson Theater	New Orleans	2,022 / 2,022 (100%)	$110,455
Multiparque	Bogotá	2,336 / 2,336 (100%)	$246,373
CC Maria Angola	Lima	1,833 / 1,833 (100%)	$180,743
Riverside Theatre	Perth	2,197 / 2,390 (92%)	$178,121
State Theatre	Sydney	5,946 / 5,946 (100%)	$507,853
The Plenary	Melbourne	5,342 / 5,401 (99%)	$464,589
Festival Theatre	Adelaide	1,814 / 1,837 (99%)	$150,114

== Band ==
- Norah Jones – Piano
- Josh Lattanzi – Bass
- Jason Abraham Roberts – Guitar
- Greg 'G Wiz' Wieczorek – Drums
