= Day Breaks =

Studio album by Norah Jones
- Released: October 7, 2016
- Recorded: 2015
- Studios: Sear Sound, New York City; Brooklyn Recording, New York City
- Genre: Jazz
- Length: 48:47
- Label: Blue Note
- Producers: Norah Jones; Eli Wolf

Norah Jones chronology
Foreverly (2013)	Day Breaks (2016)	Spotify Singles (2017)

Norah Jones studio album chronology
Little Broken Hearts (2012)	Day Breaks (2016)	Pick Me Up Off the Floor (2020)

Singles from Day Breaks
- 1. "Carry On" Released: August 5, 2016; 2. "Tragedy" Released: October 4, 2016; 3. "Flipside" Released: November 28, 2016

Day Breaks is the sixth studio album by American singer-songwriter Norah Jones, released on October 7, 2016, through Blue Note Records. The album features nine original songs and three covers. Jones returned to a piano-driven sound as heard on releases early in her career. It peaked at number two on the US Billboard 200, becoming her sixth album to reach the top ten. Day Breaks received positive reviews from music critics, with many praising the album's production and Jones' vocals with many comparing it favorably to her debut album Come Away with Me. Jones promoted the album with television performances and interviews.

== Release ==
Day Breaks was released on October 7, 2016, through Blue Note Records. At the time of its release it was made available on CD, vinyl and as a digital download. A limited edition orange vinyl was also released.

== Writing and recording ==
Eight songs on the album are composed or co-written by Jones; composing on piano, she intended the album as a return to the sound of her 2002 debut, Come Away with Me. The album was co-produced by Jones and Eli Wolf and features drummer Brian Blade, organist Lonnie Smith and saxophonist Wayne Shorter. Jones explains the songs were composed by drawing on jazz music influences and were recorded live without any overdubbing.

There are three cover songs on Day Breaks: "Peace", by Horace Silver (first recorded by Jones in 2001), "Fleurette Africaine (African Flower)", by Duke Ellington and "Don't Be Denied", originally by Neil Young, whose lyrics were recast in the third person by Jones. The album also includes "Sleeping Wild" written by Sarah Oda, who co-wrote three other tracks on the album and co-produced.

The album was released on October 7, 2016, with the first single being "Carry On". Subsequent singles included the songs "Flipside" and "Tragedy".

== Promotion ==
Jones performed songs from Day Breaks on The Tonight Show Starring Jimmy Fallon and The Today Show. She discussed the album on PBS's Tavis Smiley show on October 14, 2016. She also appeared on The Late Show with Stephen Colbert and performed her cover of Horace Silver's "Peace" from the album. To further promote the album, Jones embarked on Daybreaks World Tour.

== Critical reception ==
Professional ratings
Aggregate scores
Source	Rating
AnyDecentMusic?	7.1/10
Metacritic	77/100
Review scores
Source	Rating
AllMusic	4/5 stars
The Arts Desk	4/5 stars
The Buffalo News	3.5/4 stars
Entertainment Weekly	A−
Evening Standard	4/5 stars
Exclaim!	8/10
Mojo	4/5 stars
Newsday	A
The Sydney Morning Herald	4/5 stars
Uncut	4/5 stars

Day Breaks received an average score of 77/100 from 10 reviews on Metacritic, indicating "generally favorable reviews". Stephen Thomas Erlewine of AllMusic rated the album four out of five stars and wrote that:

Jones' originals feel as elegant as time-honored standards, and all her covers feel fresh. The former speak to her craft, the latter to her gifts as a stylist, and the two combine to turn Day Breaks into a satisfying testament to her ever-evolving musicianship.

Glenn Gamboa of Newsday rated the album an "A", calling it Jones' "latest masterpiece". Rating the album an "A−", Entertainment Weekly's Jim Farber writes of Jones: "Not since her entrancing debut has she sounded this engaged."

=== Accolades ===
Publication	Rank	List
Entertainment Weekly	25	The 50 Best Albums of 2016
Rolling Stone	46	50 Best Albums of 2016

== Commercial performance ==
Day Breaks debuted at number two on the US Billboard 200 (behind Green Day's Revolution Radio), moving 47,000 equivalent album units; it sold 44,000 copies in its first week, with the remainder of its unit total reflecting the album's streaming activity and track sales, marking her sixth top five album on the chart. It was a considerable drop from her previous efforts, Little Broken Hearts (2013) and The Fall (2009), which opened to sales of 110,000 and 180,000 units, respectively. The album debuted at number one on the US Jazz Albums chart, making it Jones' second album to reach number one.

== Track listing ==
All tracks produced by Norah Jones and Eli Wolf, co-produced by Sarah Oda.

Standard edition
No.	Title	Writer(s)	Length
1.	"Burn"	Norah Jones, Sarah Oda	4:38
2.	"Tragedy"	Jones, Oda	4:14
3.	"Flipside"	Jones, Peter Remm	3:41
4.	"It's a Wonderful Time for Love"	Jones, Oda	3:53
5.	"And Then There Was You"	Jones, Remm	3:05
6.	"Don't Be Denied"	Neil Young	5:36
7.	"Day Breaks"	Jones, Remm	3:57
8.	"Peace"	Horace Silver	5:15
9.	"Once I Had a Laugh"	Jones	3:12
10.	"Sleeping Wild"	Oda	3:07
11.	"Carry On"	Jones	2:48
12.	"Fleurette Africaine (African Flower)"	Duke Ellington	5:21
Total length:			48:47

Target bonus tracks
No.	Title	Writer(s)	Length
13.	"Carry On" (Live at the Flynn Center for the Performing Arts (Burlington, VT, 2016)	Jones	2:37
14.	"Flipside" (Live at the Newport Jazz Festival (2016)	Jones, Remm	4:39
15.	"Peace" (Live at the Newport Jazz Festival (2016)	Silver	4:12
16.	"Don't Know Why" (Live at the Newport Jazz Festival (2016)	Jesse Harris	3:36
Total length:			63:51

== Personnel ==
Musicians

- Norah Jones – vocals and piano (all tracks), Hammond B3 organ and Wurlitzer electric piano (track 3), electric guitar (6)
- Peter Remm – Hammond B3 (1, 2, 6, 7), electric guitar (7)
- Tony Scherr – electric guitar (1, 6), background vocals (6)
- Wayne Shorter – soprano saxophone (1, 7, 8, 12)
- John Patitucci – double bass (1, 8, 12)
- Chris Thomas – bass guitar (2, 3, 7), double bass (4, 5, 10, 11), electric guitar (7)
- Brian Blade – drums (except 6, 9)
- Daniel Sadownick – percussion (2, 3)
- Lonnie Smith – Hammond B3 (3), background vocals (11)
- Jon Cowherd – Hammond B3 (11)

plus on tracks 5, 7 and 10

- Dan Iead – pedal steel guitar (7 only)
- Katie Kresek, Max Moston – violin
- Todd Low – viola
- Dave Eggar – cello, string arrangements
- Tony Maceli – bass
- Chuck Palmer – string arrangements, string conductor
- Phil Faconti – orchestration, copyist

plus on tracks 6 and 9

- Leon Michels – tenor saxophone
- Dave Guy – trumpet
- J. Walter Hawkes – trombone
- Vicente Archer – double bass
- Karriem Riggins – drums
- Sasha Dobson, Sarah Oda, Catherine Popper and Petter Ericson Stakee – background vocals (6 only)

On bonus tracks 13 and 16

- Norah Jones – vocals, piano
- Pete Remm – Hammond B-3 organ
- Jason Abraham Roberts – guitar
- Josh Lattanzi – bass, backing vocals
- Greg Wieczorek – drums, backing vocals

On bonus tracks 14, 15

- Norah Jones – vocals, piano
- Pete Remm – Hammond B-3 organ
- Chris Thomas – bass
- Brian Blade – drums
- Tarriona 'Tank' Ball and Anjelika 'Jelly' Joseph – backing vocals

Technical

- Norah Jones and Eli Wolf – producer
- Sarah Oda – co-producer
- Ted Tuthill – recording engineer (at Sear Sound Studios, NYC, additional recordings at Brooklyn Recording, Brooklyn, NY)
- Owen Mulholland – assistant engineer
- Tom Elmhirst – mixing (at Electric Lady Studios, NYC)
- Joe Visciano – mixing assistant
- Cameron Alexander, Brandon Bost, Jeff Citron, Adam Tilzer – studio assistants
- Greg Calbi – mastering (at Sterling Sound, NYC)
- Marcela Avelar – art direction
- Danny Clinch – photography

== Charts ==
=== Weekly charts ===
Chart (2016)	Peak position
Argentine Albums (CAPIF)	8
Australian Albums (ARIA)	4
Australia Jazz & Blues Albums (ARIA)	1
Austrian Albums (Ö3 Austria)	2
Belgian Albums (Ultratop Flanders)	3
Belgian Albums (Ultratop Wallonia)	2
Canadian Albums (Billboard)	6
Danish Albums (Hitlisten)	10
Dutch Albums (Album Top 100)	8
Finnish Albums (Suomen virallinen lista)	34
French Albums (SNEP)	3
German Albums (Offizielle Top 100)	3
Greek Albums (IFPI)	14
Hungarian Albums (MAHASZ)	35
Irish Albums (IRMA)	18
Italian Albums (FIMI)	7
Japan Hot Albums (Billboard)	5
Japanese Albums (Oricon)	4
Japan Top Jazz Albums Sales (Billboard)	1
Japanese International Albums (Oricon)	1
New Zealand Albums (RMNZ)	2
Norwegian Albums (VG-lista)	23
Polish Albums (ZPAV)	8
Portuguese Albums (AFP)	6
Scottish Albums (Official Charts)	9
South Korean Albums (Gaon)	17
South Korean Albums International (Gaon)	1
Spanish Albums (Promusicae)	14
Swedish Albums (Sverigetopplistan)	12
Swedish Jazz Albums (Sverigetopplistan)	1
Swiss Albums (Schweizer Hitparade)	1
UK Albums (Official Charts)	9
UK Jazz & Blues Albums (Official Charts)	2
US Billboard 200	2
US Top Jazz Albums (Billboard)	1

=== Year-end charts ===
Chart (2016)	Position
Australia Jazz & Blues Albums (ARIA)	1
Austrian Albums (Ö3 Austria)	26
Belgian Albums (Ultratop Flanders)	38
Belgian Albums (Ultratop Wallonia)	60
French Albums (SNEP)	86
German Albums (Offizielle Top 100)	76
Japanese Albums (Oricon)	84
New Zealand Albums (RMNZ)	25
South Korean International Albums (Gaon)	23
Swiss Albums (Schweizer Hitparade)	58
US Top Jazz Albums (Billboard)	2

Chart (2017)	Position
Australian Jazz & Blues Albums (ARIA)	3
Belgian Albums (Ultratop Flanders)	186
US Top Jazz Albums (Billboard)	1

Chart (2018)	Position
Australian Jazz & Blues Albums (ARIA)	9

Chart (2019)	Position
Australian Jazz & Blues Albums (ARIA)	28

== Certifications and sales ==
Region	Certification	Certified units/sales
Austria (IFPI Austria)	Platinum	15,000^{*}
France (SNEP)	Gold	50,000^{‡}
Germany (BVMI)	4× Platinum	80,000^{‡}
New Zealand (RMNZ)	Gold	7,500^{‡}
Poland (ZPAV)	Platinum	20,000^{‡}
Summaries
Worldwide	—	600,000
^{*} Sales figures based on certification alone.^{‡} Sales+streaming figures based on certification alone.

== Release history ==
Region	Date	Format(s)	Label	Ref.
Worldwide	October 7, 2016	CD; digital download; LP	Blue Note	
Worldwide	October 21, 2016	Streaming	Blue Note	
