= Pick Me Up Off the Floor =

Studio album by Norah Jones
- Released: June 12, 2020
- Recorded: 2019
- Studios: Big Purple Box (Brooklyn, New York); Diamond Mine Studios (Queens, New York); Electric Lady Studios (New York City); Brooklyn Recording (Brooklyn, New York), Reservoir Studios (New York City); Rainbow Star (Brooklyn, New York); The Loft (Chicago, Illinois)
- Genres: Jazz pop; jazz folk
- Length: 45:25
- Label: Blue Note
- Producers: Norah Jones; Jeff Tweedy

Norah Jones chronology
Begin Again (2019)	Pick Me Up Off the Floor (2020)	I Dream of Christmas (2021)

Norah Jones studio album chronology
Day Breaks (2016)	Pick Me Up Off the Floor (2020)	I Dream of Christmas (2021)

Singles from Pick Me Up Off the Floor
- 1. "I'm Alive" Released: March 13, 2020; 2. "How I Weep" Released: April 14, 2020; 3. "Tryin' to Keep It Together" Released: April 29, 2020; 4. "Were You Watching?" Released: May 12, 2020; 5. "Flame Twin" Released: July 7, 2020

Pick Me Up Off the Floor is the seventh studio album by American singer-songwriter Norah Jones. The album was released on June 12, 2020, by Blue Note Records. A departure from Jones' lounge leanings of the past, Pick Me Up Off the Floor is a primarily a jazz pop and jazz folk record, with elements of orchestral pop, blues, gospel, soul, country, funk, and hip hop.

== Critical reception ==
Professional ratings
Aggregate scores
Source	Rating
Metacritic	83/100
Review scores
Source	Rating
AllMusic	4/5 stars
American Songwriter	3.5/5 stars
The Independent	4/5 stars
musicOMH	4/5 stars
The Observer	4/5 stars
The Telegraph	4/5 stars
Tom Hull	B+

Pick Me Up Off the Floor received an average score of 83 out of 100 from 10 reviews on Metacritic, indicating "universal acclaim".

Lior Phillips from Variety praised the album saying "stretching its borders from stormcloud blues to orchestral jazz pop to lithe Motown, the album is tied together by Jones' ineffable ability to convey big emotions with simplicity."

== Commercial performance ==
Pick Me Up Off the Floor debuted at number 87 on the US Billboard 200, with 10,100 album equivalent units, according to Rolling Stone charts. This became her first studio album to not reach the top ten.

== Track listing ==
No.	Title	Writer(s)	Length
1.	"How I Weep"	Norah Jones	4:42
2.	"Flame Twin"	Jones	3:21
3.	"Hurts to Be Alone"	Jones	3:25
4.	"Heartbroken, Day After"	Jones	4:12
5.	"Say No More"	Jones; Sarah Oda	4:58
6.	"This Life"	Jones	2:38
7.	"To Live"	Jones	4:28
8.	"I'm Alive"	Jones; Jeff Tweedy	4:16
9.	"Were You Watching?"	Jones; Emily Fiskio	5:16
10.	"Stumble on My Way"	Jones	3:53
11.	"Heaven Above"	Jones; Tweedy	4:15
Total length:			45:25

Target bonus tracks& Japanese edition (bonus tracks)
No.	Title	Writer(s)	Length
12.	"Street Stranger"	Jones; Fiskio	4:43
13.	"Tryin' to Keep It Together"	Jones; Thomas Bartlett	4:00
Total length:			54:11

Japanese edition bonus DVD
No.	Title	Director(s)	Length
1.	"I'm Alive" (music video)	Mara Whitehead	4:16
2.	"I'm Alive" (Japanese lyric video)	Mieko Kawakami	4:17
3.	"Flipside" (music video)	Sam Kuhn	3:50
4.	"Begin Again" (lyric video)		3:39
Total length:			70:11

Deluxe Edition
No.	Title	Writer(s)	Length
12.	"I'll Be Gone" (Featuring Mavis Staples)		4:29
13.	"Tryin' to Keep It Together"	Jones; Thomas Bartlett	3:59
14.	"Light Wind Blowing - Live from Home 6/4/20"		3:04
15.	"Nightingale - Live from Home 5/28/20"		4:48
16.	"That's the Way the World Goes Round - Live from Home 4/9/20"	John Prine	2:35
17.	"It's Gonna Be - Live from Home 6/11/20"		4:08
18.	"I Am Missing You - Live from Home 7/7/20"	Ravi Shankar	5:06
19.	"To Live - Live from Home 6/22/20"		4:48
20.	"Hurts to Be Alone - Live from Home 6/12/20"		4:48
21.	"How Deep Is the Ocean - Live from Home 8/27/20"	Irving Berlin	3:37
22.	"Sinkin' Soon - Live from Home 7/16/20"		4:51
23.	"You Don't Know - Live from Home 7/16/20"		3:59
24.	"Patience - Live from Home 3/19/20"	Guns N' Roses	5:39
25.	"I'm Alive - Live from Home 6/12/20"		4:33
26.	"Carnival Town - Live from Home 8/20/20"		4:15
27.	"Wake Me Up - Live from Home 4/23/20"		2:47
28.	"Tryin' to Keep It Together - Live from Home 5/7/20"		3:47
29.	"Begin Again - Live from Home 5/7/20"		3:43
30.	"For the Good Times - Live from Home 7/30/20"	Kris Kristofferson	4:36
Total length:			120:04

== Personnel ==
- Norah Jones - vocals and piano (on all tracks), Wurlitzer electric piano and Hammond B3 organ (track 3), drums (6), celesta (11)
- Ayane Kozasa - viola (1)
- Paul Wiancko - cello, string arrangement (1)
- Brian Blade - drums (2–6, 9)
- Pete Remm - Hammond B3 (2, 3), synthesizer and electric guitar (2)
- John Patitucci - electric bass (2)
- Christopher Thomas - upright bass (3, 4, 9)
- Ruby Amanfu and Sam Ashworth - backing vocals (3, 4, 9)
- Mauro Refosco - shaker (3)
- Dan Iead - pedal steel guitar (4, 10)
- Leon Michels - tenor saxophone (5, 7)
- Dave Guy - trumpet (5, 7)
- Jesse Murphy - upright bass (5–7)
- Nate Smith - drums (7)
- Jeff Tweedy - acoustic and electric guitar (8, 11), electric bass (8)
- Spencer Tweedy - drums (8)
- Mazz Swift - violin and backing vocals (9)
- Josh Lattanzi - electric bass (10)
- Dan Rieser and Josh Adams - drums (10)

Technical

- Norah Jones - production (except 8, 11)
- Jeff Tweedy - production (8, 11)
- Brandon Bost - recording at Electric Lady Studios, New York, NY (1)
- Andy Taub - recording at Brooklyn Recording, Brooklyn, New York (2, 5–7, 10)
- Patrick Dillett - recording at Reservoir Studios, New York (3, 4, 9)
- Matt Marinelli - additional recording at Rainbow Star, Brooklyn, NY (2–4, 6, 9, 10), mixing (1, 2, 4)
- Jake Owen - additional recording at Superlegal Studios, New York (3)
- Homer Steinweiss - horns recording at Diamond Mine Studios, Columbus, OH (5, 7)
- Jamie Landry - mixing at Flux Studios, New York (3–7, 9)
- Tom Schick - recording and mixing at The Loft, Chicago, IL (8, 11)
- Mark Greenberg - engineer (8, 11)
- Samuel Wahl - musical assistant at Brooklyn Recording, Brooklyn, NY (2, 5–7, 10, 11)
- John Muller and Joey Wunsch - musical assistants (3–7, 9)
- James Yost - musical assistant (3, 4, 9)
- Greg Calbi and Steve Fallone - mastering at Sterling Sound, Edgewater, NJ
- Frank Harkins - art direction, design
- Diane Russo - photography

== Charts ==
=== Weekly charts ===
Chart performance for Pick Me Up Off the Floor
Chart (2020)	Peak position
Australian Albums (ARIA)	21
Austrian Albums (Ö3 Austria)	2
Belgian Albums (Ultratop Flanders)	9
Belgian Albums (Ultratop Wallonia)	7
Canadian Albums (Billboard)	65
Czech Albums (ČNS IFPI)	38
Dutch Albums (Album Top 100)	16
French Albums (SNEP)	21
German Albums (Offizielle Top 100)	6
Hungarian Albums (MAHASZ)	23
Italian Albums (FIMI)	43
Japan Hot Albums (Billboard)	11
Japanese Albums (Oricon)	9
Polish Albums (ZPAV)	31
Portuguese Albums (AFP)	5
Scottish Albums (Official Charts)	10
Swiss Albums (Schweizer Hitparade)	1
UK Albums (Official Charts)	47
US Billboard 200	87
US Top Jazz Albums (Billboard)	1

=== Year-end charts ===
Chart (2020)	Position
Australian Jazz and Blues Albums (ARIA)	4
Chart (2021)	Position
Australian Jazz and Blues Albums (ARIA)	48
