= Happy Pills (song) =

Single by Norah Jones

from the album Little Broken Hearts
- Released: March 6, 2012
- Studio: Mondo (Los Angeles); Electro Vox (Los Angeles)
- Genre: Pop rock
- Length: 3:36
- Label: Blue Note
- Songwriters: Norah Jones, Brian Burton
- Producer: Danger Mouse

Norah Jones singles chronology
"More Than This" (2011)	"Happy Pills" (2012)	"Carry On" (2016)

Music video
- "Happy Pills" on YouTube

"Happy Pills" is a song by the American singer-songwriter Norah Jones. It is the lead single from her fifth studio album, Little Broken Hearts, and was released digitally on March 6, 2012. Written by Jones and co-written and produced by Brian Burton, it tells the story of Jones emancipating herself from a relationship and finding that she is better off alone. Musically, it is a gritty, bluesy song with a playful pop sound. It received mostly positive reviews, with many critics complimenting its style and the chemistry between Jones and Burton.

== Production ==
"Happy Pills" was written by Jones and co-written and produced by Brian Burton. The song surprised Jones and Burton from the moment they wrote it. Jones called it "too much fun," saying that they "couldn't stop singing it" and while they didn't know if it would fit on the record, once they listened to the song "it had to be there."

The song revolves around a breakup as Jones admits to be feeling good about not having to deal with her lover anymore. One lyric pleads, "Would you please just let me go now?", addressing a man who crushed her feelings. The song has been described as "upbeat" and "jazzy".

== Release ==
On February 28, 2012, Jones premiered "Happy Pills" on her Facebook page via SoundCloud. After she announced that she would be performing at SXSW in 2012, she added that she would perform the single for the first time at that event.

=== Live performances ===
Jones has performed the song on the Late Show with David Letterman, Later... with Jools Holland and Good Morning America.

== Critical reception ==
"'Happy Pills' tells the story of Jones emancipating herself from a relationship and finding that she’s better off alone – or at least without whoever it is she’s leaving behind. The narrative is far from groundbreaking and the lyrics themselves read like a high school poetry assignment (“with you gone, I’m alive / makes me feel like I took happy pills / and time stood still”), yet the song itself is undeniably addictive and pleasant. Thick, clean percussion fills the track – what else would you expect from a Danger Mouse production? – and Jones’ soulful voice takes on an almost sinister tone, as if she wants to make the mate she’s left behind writhe with the realization that she’s happier without him."

— review by Andrew Bailey from "Beats Per Minute"

Becky Bain of Idolator described the song as "a sunny, languid tune". In a second review, Bain said that it "is a lethargic but lovely lark of a song." Simon Vozick-Levinson from Rolling Stone wrote that her voice is "breezy" and that "breaking up never sounded so fun." Glenn Gamboa from Newsday called the track "stellar" and wrote that the song "shows how Jones is still looking to stretch musically, while maintaining her core appeal, and is destined to be in heavy rotation at cafes near you." Ray Rahman from Entertainment Weekly wrote that "the song is a simple, catchy, pop-leaning number that makes us that much more excited about Jones’ comeback year."

Chris Coplan from Consequence of Sound wrote that "the track features a bluesy guitar line as filtered through an ’80s pop sensibility, with vocals that are equal parts cooing sex kitten and retro soul songbird." Katherine St Asaph, a writer of Popdust, wrote that "her vocals are serviceable and frequently better" and that the song "is likely neither to alienate fans or placate those with words for Come Away With Me (2002). It’s exactly what a Norah Jones record would sound like in the current alt-pop climate, where breezy usually does better than torchy."

== Chart performance ==
=== Weekly charts ===
Chart (2012)	Peak position
Belgium (Ultratip Bubbling Under Flanders)	16
Belgium (Ultratip Bubbling Under Wallonia)	16
France (SNEP)	188
Japan (Japan Hot 100)	7
US Billboard Rock Songs	44
US Billboard Adult Alternative Songs	4
US Billboard Adult Contemporary	13

=== Year-end charts ===
Chart (2012)	position
Japan (Japan Hot 100)	35
US Adult Contemporary (Billboard)	27

== Music video ==
A lyric video for the track was released on March 5, 2012. The official music video, directed by Isaiah Seret, premiered on VH1 on April 6, 2012. According to "Under the Gun" the video features Jones crooning about the feeling of being in love against visuals of simple elegance, murder, and grace. Jones told VH1 that "It’s like a murder-not-so-much-of-a-mystery. It’s more like a murder-thriller. A thriller!"

== Personnel ==
- Norah Jones – piano, electric guitar & vocals
- Brian Burton – drums & synthesizer
- Dan Elkan – electric guitar
- Johnathan Hischke – bass guitar
- Blake Mills – electric guitar
- Todd Monfalcone – electric guitar
