= Visions (Norah Jones album) =

Studio album by Norah Jones
- Released: March 8, 2024
- Studio: Diamond Mine North (Rhinebeck, NY); The Legendary Diamond Mine (Long Island, NY)
- Length: 45:34
- Label: Blue Note
- Producer: Leon Michels

Norah Jones chronology
I Dream of Christmas (2021)	Visions (2024)

Singles from Visions
- 1. "Running" Released: January 18, 2024; 2. "Paradise" Released: March 8, 2024

Visions is the ninth studio album by American singer-songwriter Norah Jones. It was released on March 8, 2024, by Blue Note Records.

The album won Best Traditional Pop Vocal Album at the 67th Annual Grammy Awards.

== Background ==
Visions was produced by Leon Michels. Of the album's title, Jones said in a press release that the majority of the ideas she envisioned for the album "came in the middle of the night or in that moment right before sleep, and "Running" was one of them where you're half asleep and kind of jolted awake."

The album is described by the Los Angeles Times as "a funky, gently psychedelic garage-soul record."

== Promotion ==
The album's lead single, "Running", was released on January 18, 2024, simultaneously with the album's announcement. Jones announced she would be embarking on a North American tour starting in Spring in support of the album.

== Critical reception ==
Professional ratings
Aggregate scores
Source	Rating
AnyDecentMusic?	7.1
Metacritic	81/100
Review scores
Source	Rating
AllMusic	4/5 stars
The Arts Desk	3/5 stars
The Irish Times	3/5 stars
The Line of Best Fit	9/10
Riff	8/10
Shatter the Standards	4/5 stars

At Metacritic, which assigns a normalized rating out of 100 to reviews from mainstream critics, the album received an average score of 81 based on six reviews, indicating "universal acclaim". The review aggregator site AnyDecentMusic? compiled seven reviews and gave Visions an average of 7.1 out of 10, based on their assessment of the critical consensus.

== Commercial performance ==
Visions debuted at number 168 on the US Billboard 200, number 1 on the Jazz Albums and number 40 on the Top Rock & Alternative Albums charts with pure sales of 7,000 copies.

== Track listing ==
Visions track listing
No.	Title	Writer(s)	Length
1.	"All This Time"	Norah Jones; Leon Michels	3:15
2.	"Staring at the Wall"	Jones; Michels	4:31
3.	"Paradise"	Jones; Michels	3:25
4.	"Queen of the Sea"	Jones	4:46
5.	"Visions"	Jones	2:42
6.	"Running"	Jones; Michels	3:28
7.	"I Just Wanna Dance"	Jones; Michels; Homer Steinweiss	3:07
8.	"I'm Awake"	Jones	4:18
9.	"Swept Up in the Night"	Jones; Michels	3:34
10.	"On My Way"	Jones; Pete Remm	3:52
11.	"Alone with My Thoughts"	Jones; Michels	4:14
12.	"That's Life"	Jones; Michels	4:22
Total length:			45:34

Target bonus track
No.	Title	Writer(s)	Length
13.	"Until My Heart Is Found"	Jones; Michels	4:46

Japanese limited edition and SACD bonus track
No.	Title	Writer(s)	Length
13.	"Can You Believe"	Jones; Michels	3:56

== Personnel ==
Musicians

- Norah Jones – vocals, piano (all tracks); guitar (tracks 1–7, 10); bass, keyboards (6, 10); Wurlitzer electric piano (7), organ (8, 10, 12), synthesizer (9)
- Leon Michels – drums (tracks 1–4, 6, 12), bass (1–4, 7, 12), tambourine (1–3, 6–10), guitar (1), tenor saxophone (4, 7, 9, 11), baritone saxophone (6), drum programming (10), organ (11)
- Dave Guy – trumpet (tracks 4, 5, 7, 9, 11)
- Homer Steinweiss – drums (track 7)
- Jesse Murphy – bass (tracks 8, 9), upright bass (11)
- Brian Blade – drums (tracks 8, 9, 11)

Technical

- Leon Michels – production, engineering
- Alex Deturk – mastering
- Garrett Robinson – mastering
- Scott Hull – mastering
- Jens Jungkurth – mixing (all tracks), engineering (8, 9, 11)
- Lucas Carpenter – engineering assistance

== Charts ==
=== Weekly charts ===
Weekly chart performance for Visions
Chart (2024)	Peak position
Austrian Albums (Ö3 Austria)	3
Belgian Albums (Ultratop Flanders)	10
Belgian Albums (Ultratop Wallonia)	9
Croatian International Albums (HDU)	2
Dutch Albums (Album Top 100)	50
French Albums (SNEP)	12
German Albums (Offizielle Top 100)	7
Japanese Albums (Oricon)	14
Japanese Combined Albums (Oricon)	27
Japanese Hot Albums (Billboard Japan)	18
New Zealand Albums (RMNZ)	38
Polish Albums (ZPAV)	32
Portuguese Albums (AFP)	56
Scottish Albums (OCC)	18
Swedish Physical Albums (Sverigetopplistan)	11
Swiss Albums (Schweizer Hitparade)	3
UK Albums (OCC)	80
UK Jazz & Blues Albums (OCC)	1
US Billboard 200	168
US Top Jazz Albums (Billboard)	1
US Indie Store Album Sales (Billboard)	17

=== Monthly charts ===
Monthly chart performance for Visions
Chart (2024)	Position
Japanese Albums (Oricon)	45
