= I Dream of Christmas =

Studio album by Norah Jones
- Released: October 15, 2021
- Studio: Diamond Mine North (Rhinebeck, NY); The Legendary Diamond Mine (Long Island, NY)
- Genre: Christmas
- Length: 42:21
- Label: Blue Note
- Producer: Leon Michels

Norah Jones chronology
Pick Me Up Off the Floor (2020)	I Dream of Christmas (2021)	Visions (2024)

Singles from I Dream of Christmas
- 1. "Christmas Calling (Jolly Jones)" Released: October 1, 2021; 2. "I Dream of Christmas" Released: December 3, 2021

I Dream of Christmas is the eighth studio album and first Christmas album by American singer-songwriter Norah Jones. It was released by Blue Note Records on October 15, 2021.

== Critical reception ==
Professional ratings
Review scores
Source	Rating
All About Jazz	3.5/5 stars
AllMusic	3.5/5 stars
The Arts Desk	4/5 stars
Knoxville News Sentinel	4.5/5 stars
PopMatters	8/10
The Times	4/5 stars

I Dream of Christmas earned largely favorable reviews from music critics. AllMusic editor Timothy Monger wrote about the album: "Tucked amid elegant arrangements of [...] standards are crafty Jones originals like "Christmas Calling (Jolly Jones)" and "It's Only Christmas Once a Year," each one built to last more than one season [...] Playful, cozy, and effortlessly low-key, I Dream of Christmas has all the hallmarks of a seasonal staple." PopMatters editor Peter Piatkowski found that I Dream of Christmas "feels like a soothing salve on what seems like another troubled holiday season. The record is a wonderful soundtrack to the upcoming festivities and should be on the playlist of everyone’s Christmas party."

Liz Thomson, wrinting for The Arts Desk, called I Dream of Christmas a "pleasing and well-paced selection of songs amid which even the ubiquitous "White Christmas" is more than tolerable – up-tempo, brush drums, Jones’ piano quoting from other festive faves and her breathy vocal giving it a sexy, yearning quality." She felt that "Jones' skill is to remind us that tired and hideously overdone as many of these numbers are, intrinsically good songs lie hidden beneath the musical cliches." All About Jazz editor Jim Trageser declared the album "a lovely addition to the Christmas canon, with some wonderfully creative takes on old favorites coupled to some inspired new seasonal compositions."

Stephanie Kaloi from Entertainment Weekly found that "Jones gifted us the perfect record to accompany introspective winter nights. With her sweeping and gentle takes on Christmas classics as well as her own originals, Jones combines the nostalgic sentiment expressed in much of her music with a certain holiday glow on a record to which you can kiss or cry." Knoxville News Sentinel critic Chuck Campbell, wrote that the album was "even better than might have been expected as Jones and her band capture a cozy holiday vibe, soothing and a bit surreal, sometimes playful and occasionally melancholy. I Dream of Christmas is replete with the signature sleek, jazzy tones Jones has employed since her 2002 debut, Come Away With Me."

== Track listing ==
All tracks produced by Leon Michels.

I Dream of Christmas track listing
No.	Title	Writer(s)	Length
1.	"Christmas Calling (Jolly Jones)"	Norah Jones	3:20
2.	"Christmas Don't Be Late"	Ross Bagdasarian	2:40
3.	"Christmas Glow"	Jones	2:45
4.	"White Christmas"	Irving Berlin	3:05
5.	"Christmastime"	Jones; Leon Michels	4:00
6.	"Blue Christmas"	Billy Hayes; Jay W. Johnson	3:24
7.	"It's Only Christmas Once a Year"	Jones	2:04
8.	"You're Not Alone"	Jones; Leon Michels	3:52
9.	"Winter Wonderland"	Richard B. Smith; Felix Bernard	3:32
10.	"A Holiday with You"	Jones	2:40
11.	"Run Rudolph Run"	Johnny Marks; Marvin Brodie	3:11
12.	"Christmas Time Is Here"	Lee Mendelson; Vince Guaraldi	3:45
13.	"What Are You Doing New Year's Eve?"	Frank Loesser	4:03
Total length:			42:21

Target bonus track / Japanese edition (bonus track)
No.	Title	Writer(s)	Length
14.	"O Holy Night"	Adolphe Adam	2:18
Total length:			44:45

Amazon deluxe edition bonus tracks
No.	Title	Writer(s)	Length
14.	"I Dream of Christmas"	Jones; Michels	3:22
15.	"The Christmas Waltz"	Sammy Cahn; Jule Styne	3:17
16.	"Last Month of the Year"	Vera Hall; Ruby Pickens Tartt; Alan Lomax	2:51
17.	"I'll Be Home for Christmas"	Buck Ram; Kim Gannon; Walter Kent	4:10
Total length:			56:01

2022 deluxe edition bonus tracks
No.	Title	Writer(s)	Length
14.	"Last Month of the Year"	Hall; Pickens Tartt; Lomax	2:51
15.	"I'll Be Home for Christmas"	Ram; Gannon; Kent	4:10
16.	"The Christmas Waltz"	Cahn; Styne	3:17
17.	"O Holy Night"	Adam	2:18
18.	"I Dream of Christmas"	Jones; Michels	3:22
19.	"Have Yourself a Merry Little Christmas"	Ralph Blane; Hugh Martin	4:16
20.	"Christmas in My Soul / Christmastime" (Live from The Empire State Building)	Laura Nyro; Jones; Michels	4:49
21.	"Run Rudolph Run" (Live from The Empire State Building)	Marks; Brodie	3:16
22.	"Blue Christmas" (Live from The Empire State Building)	Billy Hayes; Johnson	3:46
23.	"You're Not Alone" (Live from The Empire State Building)	Jones; Michels	3:38
24.	"Christmas Calling (Jolly Jones)" (Live from The Empire State Building)	Jones	3:15

== Charts ==
=== Weekly charts ===
Chart performance for I Dream of Christmas
Chart (2021)	Peak position
Australian Albums (ARIA)	16
Austrian Albums (Ö3 Austria)	6
Belgian Albums (Ultratop Flanders)	79
Belgian Albums (Ultratop Wallonia)	38
Canadian Albums (Billboard)	72
Dutch Albums (Album Top 100)	41
French Albums (SNEP)	141
German Albums (Offizielle Top 100)	35
Japanese Albums (Oricon)	29
Portuguese Albums (AFP)	39
Scottish Albums (OCC)	89
Swiss Albums (Schweizer Hitparade)	20
US Billboard 200	100
US Top Holiday Albums (Billboard)	4
US Top Jazz Albums (Billboard)	4

=== Year-end charts ===
Year-end chart performance for I Dream of Christmas
Chart (2021)	Position
Australian Jazz and Blues Albums (ARIA)	7
Austrian Albums (Ö3 Austria)	61

== Release history ==
Release history for I Dream of Christmas
Region	Date	Edition	Format	Label	Ref.
Various	October 15, 2021	Standard	CD; digital download; streaming	Blue Note	
Various	October 21, 2022	Deluxe reissue	CD; digital download; streaming	Blue Note	
