= Norah Jones =

American singer-songwriter and musician (born 1979)

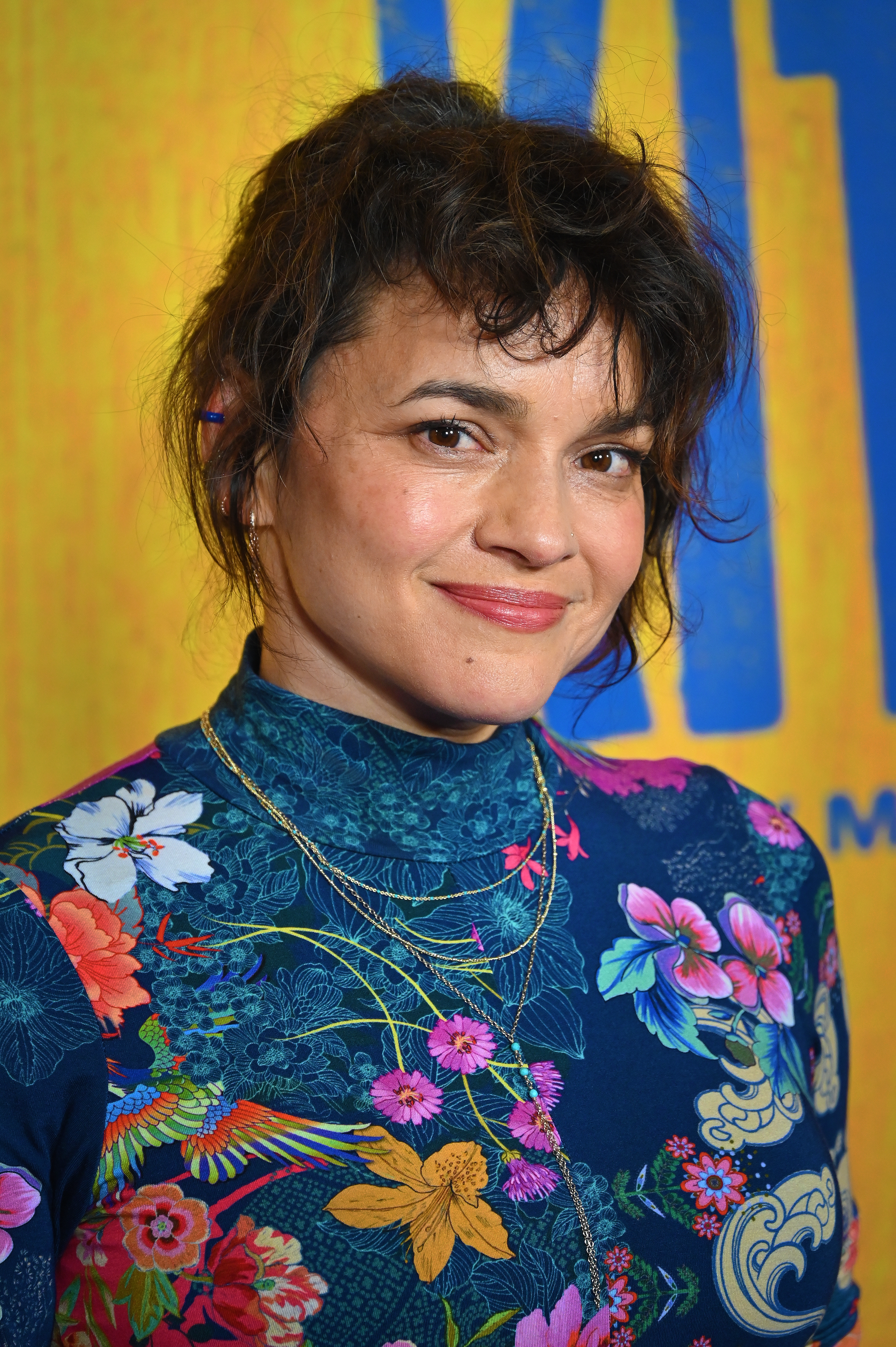
- Jones in 2025
- Born: Geethali Norah Jones Shankar; March 30, 1979 (age 47); New York City, U.S.
- Occupations: Singer; songwriter; musician
- Spouse: Pete Remm (m. 2014)
- Children: 2
- Parents: Ravi Shankar (father); Sue Jones (mother)
- Relatives: Anoushka Shankar (half-sister); Shubhendra Shankar (half-brother); Uday Shankar (uncle); Amala Shankar (aunt); Mamata Shankar (first cousin); Viji Subramaniam (first cousin); Gingger Shankar (first cousin once removed)
- Musical career
- Genres: Pop; jazz; country; folk; rock
- Instruments: Vocals; piano; guitar
- Years active: 2000–present
- Label: Blue Note
- Member of: The Little Willies; Puss n Boots; El Madmo
- Formerly of: Wax Poetic
- Website: norahjones.com

Signature
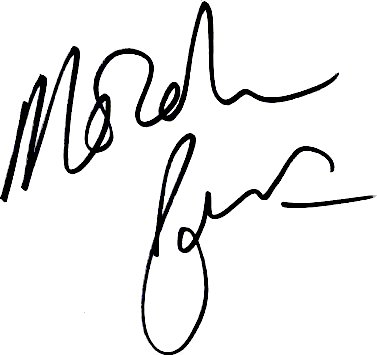

Norah Jones (/ˈnɔːrə/ NOR-ə; born Geethali Norah Jones Shankar, March 30, 1979) is an American singer-songwriter and musician. She has won several awards for her music and, as of 2023, has sold more than 53 million albums worldwide. Billboard named her the top jazz artist of the 2000s decade. She has won ten Grammy Awards and was ranked 60th on Billboard magazine's Artists of the 2000s Decade chart.

In 2002, Jones launched her solo music career with the release of Come Away with Me, which was a fusion of jazz with country, blues, folk and pop. It was certified diamond, selling over 27 million copies, making it the third best-selling album of the 21st century. The record earned Jones five Grammy Awards, including the Album of the Year, Record of the Year, and Best New Artist. Jones is the first person of South Asian descent to win 5 Grammy Awards at a single show.

Her subsequent studio albums Feels Like Home (2004), Not Too Late (2007), and The Fall (2009) all gained platinum status, selling more than a million copies each. They were also generally well received by critics. Jones made her feature film debut as an actress in My Blueberry Nights, which was released in 2007 and was directed by Wong Kar-Wai.

== Early life ==
Jones was born Geethali Norah Jones Shankar on March 30, 1979, in Manhattan, New York City, to American concert producer Sue Jones and Indian Bengali musician Ravi Shankar.

After her parents separated in 1986, Jones lived with her mother, growing up in Grapevine, Texas. As a child, Jones began singing in church and also took piano and voice lessons. When she was eleven years old, Jones and her mother lived in Anchorage, Alaska. She attended Colleyville Middle School and Grapevine High School before transferring to Booker T. Washington High School for the Performing and Visual Arts in Dallas. Her music took its first form early on in the local Methodist Church where she regularly sang solos. While in high school, she sang in the school choir, participated in band, and played the alto saxophone. At the age of 16, with both parents' consent, she officially changed her name to Norah Jones.

Jones always had an affinity for the music of Bill Evans and Billie Holiday, among other "oldies". She once said: "My mom had this eight-album Billie Holiday set; I picked out one disc that I liked and played that over and over again."

Jones attended Interlochen Center for the Arts during the summers. While at high school, she won the Down Beat Student Music Awards for Best Jazz Vocalist (twice, in 1996 and 1997) and Best Original Composition (1996).

Jones attended the University of North Texas (UNT), where she majored in jazz piano and sang with the UNT Jazz Singers. During this time, she had a chance meeting with future collaborator Jesse Harris. She gave a ride to a band playing at the university whose members happened to be friends of Harris. He was on a cross-country road trip with friend and future Little Willies member Richard Julian, and stopped to see the band play. After meeting Jones, Harris started sending her lead sheets of his songs.

In 1999, Jones left Texas for New York City. Less than a year later, she started a band with Harris, and her recordings with them were bestsellers.

== Musical career ==
Jones was a lounge singer before becoming a recording artist. Before releasing her first studio album, she performed with Wax Poetic, Peter Malick, and jazz guitarist Charlie Hunter.

=== 2000–2002: New York City, First Sessions and Come Away with Me ===
As Peter Malick states in the liner notes, "I started looking for a singer who might be open to recording [my latest songs] for me. On a Tuesday night, I walked into the Living Room just as the singer announced the last song of the set. The Dinah Washington classic 'Since I Fell for You' filled the room and I was struck breathless. Here, in the tradition of Billie Holiday, was a stunningly beautiful, blues infused voice. This was my first contact with Norah Jones." Malick asked her to participate in sessions at Room 9 from Outer Space in South Boston, during August and September 2000. They recorded Malick's songs "New York City", "Strange Transmissions", "Deceptively Yours" and "Things You Don't Have to Do" in addition to cover versions of "All Your Love" by Sam Maghett and "Heart of Mine" by Bob Dylan. These songs became the album New York City (Koch, 2003) by the Peter Malick Group Featuring Norah Jones.

After moving to New York City, Jones signed to Blue Note, a label owned by EMI Group. The signing came as an indirect result of her performing as lead singer for the JC Hopkins Biggish Band. Shell White, who was the wife of J. C. Hopkins, worked for EMI Publishing and gave Jones's three-track demo to Bruce Lundvall, the label's president, and Brian Bacchus, its artists and repertoire agent (A&R). The demo contained two jazz standards and a song by Jesse Harris. The two executives agreed that Jones had potential. Despite their misgivings about the direction of her music, they signed her to the label. Bacchus told HitQuarters, "We let her find her own direction ... We knew that if she could develop her songwriting and we could find great songs, it would work."

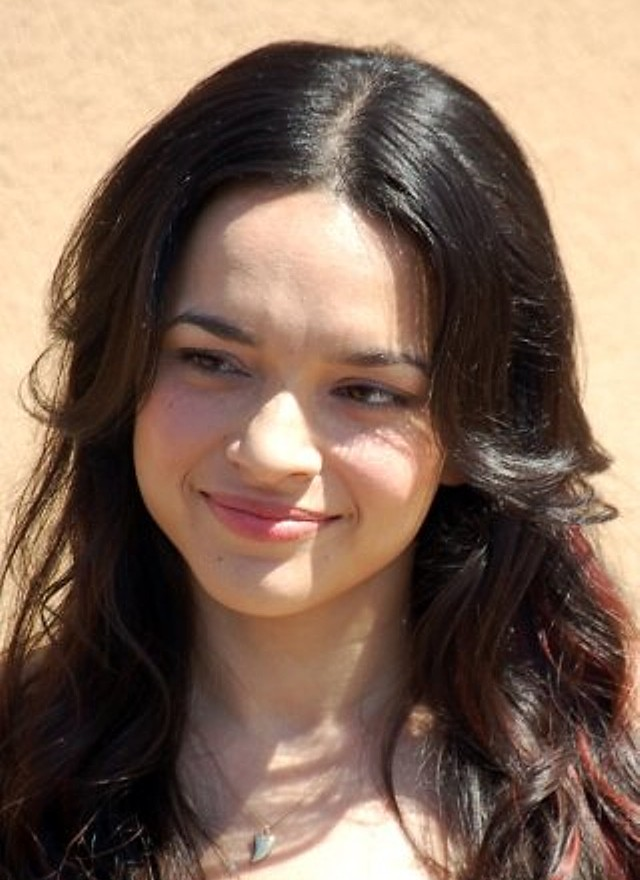
Jones at the premiere of My Blueberry Nights at the 2007 Cannes Film Festival

Bacchus thought producer and engineer Jay Newland's experience in jazz, blues, rock, country, and folk music would give a "feeling for her sound". Jones and Newland recorded nine demo tracks on October 8 and 9, 2000. Four appeared on the sampler First Sessions, released on May 30, 2001, with the rest were set aside for her debut album. Come Away with Me (2002) was praised for its blend of acoustic pop with soul and jazz. Debuting at No. 139, it reached No. 1 on the U.S. Billboard 200. The single "Don't Know Why" hit No. 1 on the Top 40 Adult Recurrents in 2003 and No. 30 in the Billboard Hot 100 Singles Chart. At the 45th Grammy Awards in 2003, Jones was nominated for eight Grammy Awards and won five: Best New Artist, Album of the Year, Best Pop Vocal Album, Record of the Year, and Best Female Pop Vocal Performance for "Don't Know Why". This tied Lauryn Hill and Alicia Keys for most Grammy Awards received by a female artist in one night. Jesse Harris won Song of the Year for "Don't Know Why", while Arif Mardin won Producer of the Year. The album won Best Engineered Album, Non-Classical. Come Away with Me was certified platinum by the Recording Industry Association of America (RIAA) for having sold one million copies. In February 2005, it was certified diamond for selling ten million copies.

=== 2004–2009: Feels like Home, Not Too Late and The Fall ===
Feels like Home (2004) debuted at the top of the charts in at least 16 countries, including Germany, New Zealand, and the United Kingdom. At the 47th Grammy Awards in 2005, the album was nominated for three Grammys, winning one, Best Female Pop Vocal Performance for "Sunrise". For "Here We Go Again", a duet with Ray Charles, she won Record of the Year and Best Pop Collaboration with Vocals. Time magazine named Jones one of the most influential people of 2004. In January 2005, she performed at a benefit concert for the victims of the 2004 Indian Ocean earthquake and tsunami.

Jones released her third album, Not Too Late, on January 30, 2007. The album was the first for which she wrote or co-wrote every song. She has said some of these songs are much darker than those on her previous albums. Not Too Late was mostly recorded at Jones's home studio. It is her first album without producer Arif Mardin, who died in the summer of 2006. Jones described the sessions as "fun, relaxed and easy" and without a deadline; Blue Note executives reportedly did not know she was recording an album. The song "My Dear Country" is political commentary; she wrote it before the United States Presidential election day in 2004. Not Too Late reached the No. 1 position in twenty countries. Not Too Late had the third-best first week of sales in 2007, behind Avril Lavigne's The Best Damn Thing and Linkin Park's Minutes to Midnight. It reached No. 1 in the U.S., selling 405,000 copies. EMI announced that Not Too Late reached gold, platinum or multi-platinum in 21 countries as of February 2007. The album has sold 4 million copies worldwide. That same year, she sang "American Anthem" for the Ken Burns documentary The War.

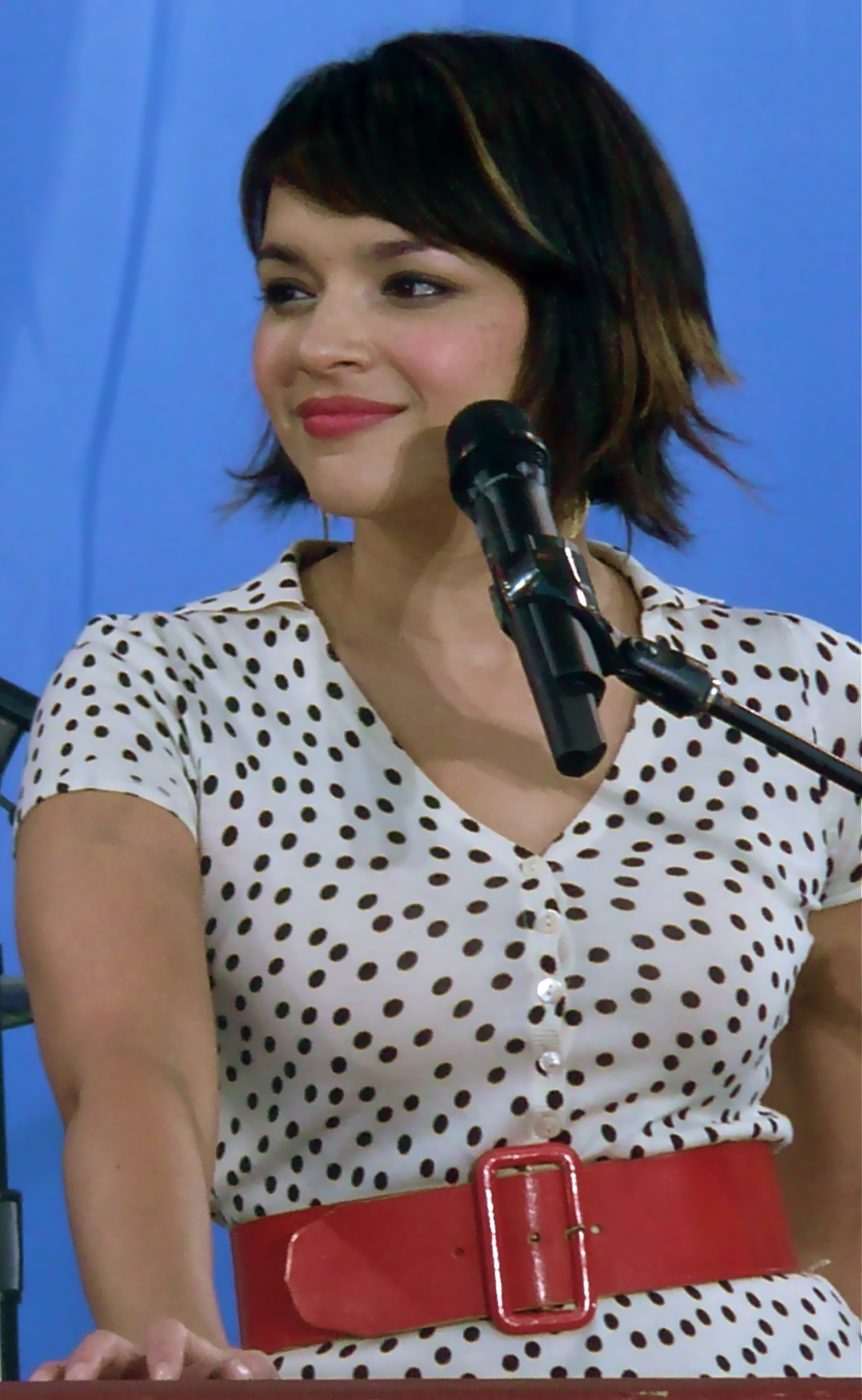
Jones performing on Good Morning America in 2010.

Jones's fourth studio album, The Fall, debuted at No. 3 on the Billboard 200 in November 2009, selling 180,000 copies in its first week. Although it was her first album that did not reach No. 1 in the United States, it did receive critical acclaim. As part of the promotional drive for the album, Jones performed on Dancing with the Stars, Late Show with David Letterman, Good Morning America and other television programs. The Fall featured a St. Bernard on the cover; his name is Ben. The album's lead single, "Chasing Pirates", peaked at No. 13 on Hot Adult Contemporary Tracks and No. 7 on Jazz Songs. Billboard's 2000–2009 decade awards ranked Jones as the top jazz recording artist, at No. 60 best Artist. Come Away With Me was elected the No. 4 album and No. 1 jazz album.

Jones earned a platinum certification by the RIAA for sales of 1 million copies of The Fall. The album sold 1.5 million copies worldwide and was certified gold or platinum in 14 countries as of 2010. "Baby, It's Cold Outside", a duet with Willie Nelson, was nominated in the Best Pop Collaboration with Vocals category. In 2009, Jones performed "Come Away With Me" and "Young Blood" at the end of the Apple Inc.'s It's Only Rock and Roll press conference on September 9 in San Francisco, for the release of iTunes 9 and video camera-equipped iPods, among other items She also made a guest appearance and performed with other artists on the season three finale of the NBC series 30 Rock. Jones started her fourth world tour on March 5, 2010.

=== 2012–2019: Little Broken Hearts, Day Breaks and Begin Again ===
After working with Danger Mouse and Daniele Luppi on some of the tracks for their album Rome, Jones worked with Danger Mouse again on her fifth studio album, Little Broken Hearts, which was released on May 1, 2012. She played the album in its entirety at SXSW 2012. American Songwriter called Little Broken Hearts the "most dramatic and rewarding departure she's made in her career." On May 25, 2012, she began her fifth world tour in Paris, with performances in Europe, North America, Asia, South America, and Australia. She performed in London at the Roundhouse on September 10, 2012, as part of the iTunes Festival which was broadcast on the internet. She toured three cities in India for the first time because her father wanted her to do so. She also performed a headlining performance at Summer's Day, music festival produced by Only Much Louder. The tour started at Summer's Day in Mumbai on March 3 and included stops in New Delhi on March 5 and Bangalore on March 8.

Her sixth studio album, Day Breaks, which included nine new songs and three cover versions, was released on October 7, 2016. "Carry On", the album's lead single, was released to digital outlets on the same day. The album marked a return to her piano after dabbling in folk and pop on the last two records. Jones said the goal of this record was to do everything live. She said in an interview with Billboard: "When you have great musicians, there's no reason to overdub. That strips the soul out of the music." In 2019, Jones released a compilation album of singles she recorded from 2018 to 2019, titled Begin Again, and the set includes collaborations with Jeff Tweedy and Thomas Bartlett.

=== 2020–present: Pick Me Up Off the Floor, I Dream of Christmas, and Visions ===
Her seventh studio album, Pick Me Up Off the Floor, was released on June 12, 2020. It debuted at number 87 on the US Billboard 200, making it Jones's first album not to debut in the top three. Her eighth studio album, I Dream of Christmas, was released in 2021, with an expanded version released in 2022. In 2023, Jones was featured on rapper Logic's song "Paradise II" from his first independent studio album, College Park.

In March 2024, Jones released her ninth studio album, Visions, produced by Leon Michels. It was described by The Los Angeles Times as "a funky, gently psychedelic garage-soul record". The album won the Grammy Award for Best Traditional Pop Vocal Album at the 67th Grammy Awards in 2025, Jones's tenth Grammy win.

Visions, was composed untraditionally through a collaboration with producer and instrumentalist Leon Michels. Much of the album came together through spontaneous studio sessions between the musicians. The result being a raw and soulful sound, Jones would serve as her own guitarist whilst Leon would handle the percussion and bass.

== Additional projects and collaborations ==
Jones made a cameo appearance as herself in the 2002 movie Two Weeks Notice, which starred Hugh Grant and Sandra Bullock. The film shows her briefly at the piano, singing for a charity benefit.

In 2003, The Peter Malick Group and Jones released an album, New York City. Jones appeared on OutKast's Speakerboxxx/The Love Below album, on "Take Off Your Cool". This album won the Grammy Award for Album of the Year (Jones was not credited). Also in 2003, Jones appeared on Joel Harrison's album of jazz interpretations of country and folk songs, Free Country, as lead vocalist on "I Walk the Line" and "Tennessee Waltz".

Jones formed The Little Willies in 2003, alongside Richard Julian on vocals, Jim Campilongo on guitar, Lee Alexander on bass, and Dan Rieser on drums. The alt country band released its eponymous first album in 2006 and For the Good Times in 2012.

Jones appeared in the 2004 special, Sesame Street Presents: The Street We Live On. Jones appeared in the concert and DVD "Return to Sin City – A Tribute to Gram Parsons". Jones performed the song "She" and then, together with Keith Richards of The Rolling Stones, sang "Love Hurts".

In 2005, Jones appeared on the Foo Fighters' album In Your Honor, performing piano and vocals on the song "Virginia Moon". The track was nominated for a Grammy for Best Pop Collaboration with Vocals, in 2006.

Jones appeared on Ryan Adams's & The Cardinals' 2005 album, Jacksonville City Nights, on the track "Dear John", which she co-wrote with Adams. In 2011, Jones also played piano and vocals on numerous tracks on Ryan Adams's 2011 studio album Ashes & Fire.

Jones worked with Mike Patton in 2006, providing vocals on the track "Sucker" on the Peeping Tom project. The song attracted attention as it was the first time Jones used profanity in a recording.

In 2007, Jones made her acting debut as the protagonist in a film directed by Wong Kar-wai. The film, My Blueberry Nights, opened for the 2007 Cannes Film Festival as one of the 22 films in competition. She wrote and performed a song, "The Story", for the movie.

In January 2007, Jones recorded a live session at Abbey Road Studios for Live from Abbey Road. The episode, on which John Mayer and Richard Ashcroft also appeared, was aired on UK Channel 4 and on the Sundance Channel. She appeared twice on the PBS series Austin City Limits, on November 2, 2002, and October 6, 2007. The latter appearance was the season opener.

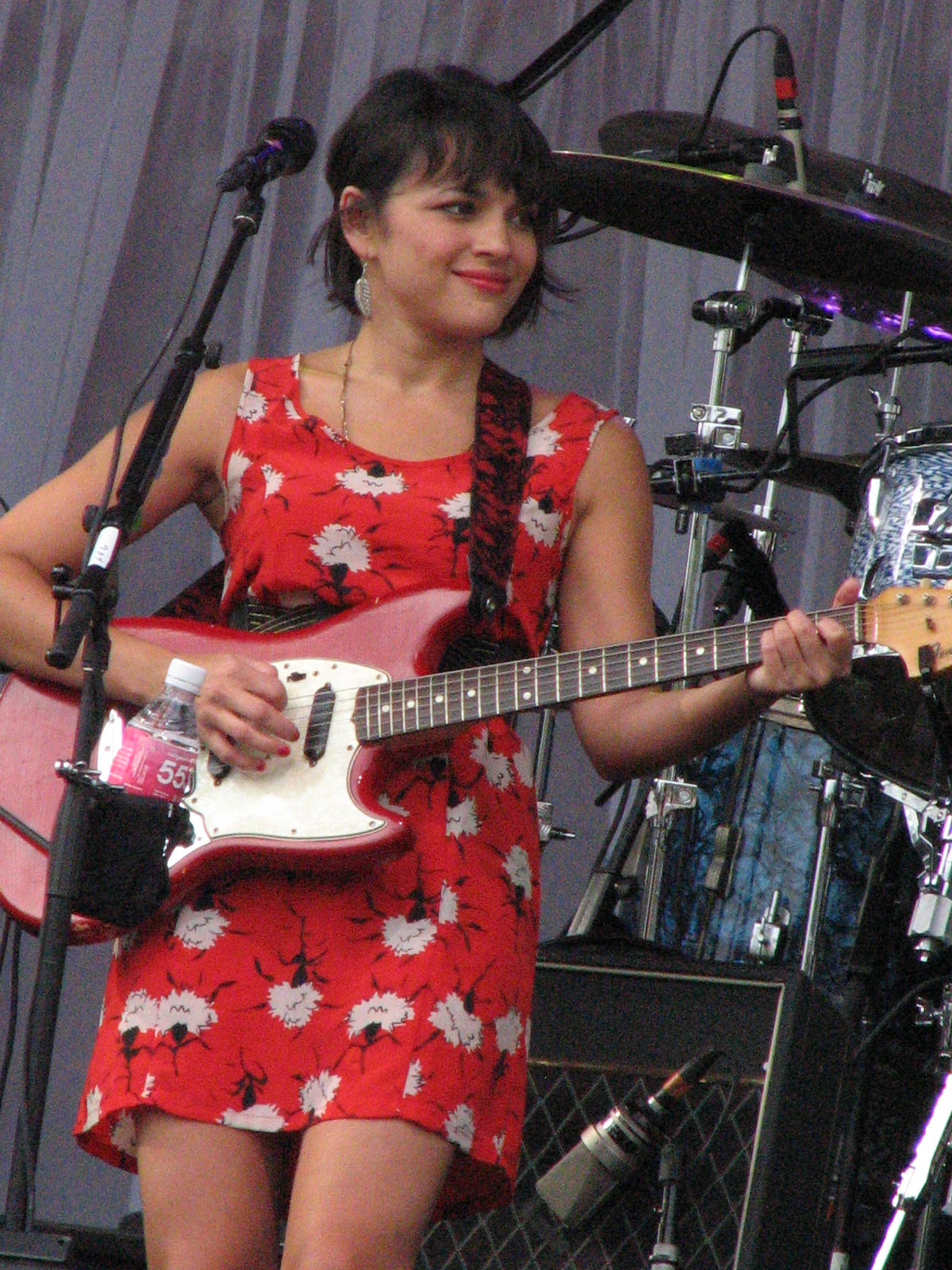
Jones performing at Parque Independência in 2010

In a change of direction predating The Fall, Jones (referring to herself as "Maddie" and virtually anonymous in a blond wig) sang and played guitar with rock band El Madmo. The band consists of Jones, Daru Oda and Richard Julian and released an eponymous album on May 20, 2007.

In 2008, she recorded a duet with A Tribe Called Quest front man Q-Tip, titled "Life Is Better" from his "Renaissance" LP.

Jones appears in Herbie Hancock's 2007 release River: The Joni Letters, singing the first track, "Court and Spark". This album won the Grammy Award for Album of the Year at the 50th Grammy Awards in 2008; Jones was credited as a featured artist, her ninth Grammy win.

Jones is one of the participants in the so-called "Hank Williams Project" overseen by Bob Dylan, and reportedly including contributions from Willie Nelson, Jack White, Lucinda Williams, and Alan Jackson. On March 31, 2008, Jones commemorated the 20th anniversary of The Living Room with a midnight performance at the intimate Manhattan music venue where the singer got her start. She played a new song titled "How Many Times Have You Broken My Heart" and explained that it originated from newly found Hank Williams lyrics she was asked to put to music. Jones also performed the song in late 2008 on Elvis Costello's talk/music television series, Spectacle: Elvis Costello with....

Jones was a judge for the 5th annual Independent Music Awards, supporting independent artists' careers.

Jones sang on the song "Dreamgirl" on The Lonely Island album Incredibad, which came out in 2009.

In 2010, Jones contributed "World of Trouble" to the Enough Project and Downtown Records' Raise Hope for Congo compilation. Proceeds from the compilation fund efforts to make the protection and empowerment of Congo's women a priority, as well as inspire individuals around the world to raise their voices for peace in Congo.

Jones released ...Featuring, a compilation album of collaborations she has done with well-known musicians, including the Foo Fighters, Willie Nelson, Dirty Dozen Brass Band, Outkast, Q-Tip, Talib Kweli, Belle and Sebastian, Ray Charles, Ryan Adams, Dolly Parton, Herbie Hancock, M. Ward, and others. Jones said, "It's so exciting and flattering and fun when I get asked to sing with somebody that I admire.... It takes you a little bit out of your comfort zone when you're doing something with another artist. You don't know what to expect—it's kind of like being a little kid and having a playdate." The 18-track Blue Note disc was released on November 16, 2010.

Jones recorded a Christmas duet, "Home for the Holidays", with Cyndi Lauper.

As a tribute to Steve Jobs, Jones performed a live three-song set at the Apple Campus in October 2011. It included "Nearness of You", "Painter Song", and Bob Dylan's "Forever Young". Forever Young was performed in honor of Jobs, because "he liked Bob Dylan".

Jones collaborated with Family Guy creator Seth MacFarlane on his Grammy-nominated 2011 debut studio album Music Is Better Than Words on the song "Two Sleepy People". Jones also had a cameo appearance in MacFarlane's 2012 feature film Ted. Additionally for the film, she collaborated with MacFarlane and Family Guy composer Walter Murphy on the song "Everybody Needs a Best Friend", recorded on the motion picture soundtrack album and nominated for the Academy Award for Best Original Song. Jones would later collaborate with MacFarlane on his second studio album Holiday for Swing on the song "Little Jack Frost Get Lost".

Jones sang "It Came Upon Midnight Clear", "Silent Night" and "Pooping Log (Caga Tió)" on the Holiday Special 2011 of Anthony Bourdain: No Reservations.

In September 2012, she appeared in "30 Songs/30 Days" to support Half the Sky: Turning Oppression into Opportunity for Women Worldwide, a multi-platform media project inspired by Nicholas Kristof and Sheryl WuDunn's book.

Jones is featured on Robert Glasper's 2013 album Black Radio 2, singing "Let It Ride".

In October 2013, it was revealed that Jones and Green Day front man Billie Joe Armstrong would be releasing a duets LP. The album, consisting of covers from the Everly Brothers' album Songs Our Daddy Taught Us, was titled Foreverly and released on November 25, 2013.

Jones collaborated with her half-sister, Anoushka Shankar, on Shankar's album Traces of You, released on October 22, 2013. She contributed vocals to three songs on the album.

Jones recorded an album with her country music project, an all-female trio called Puss n Boots, which consists of Jones, Sasha Dobson and Catherine Popper. The album, titled No Fools, No Fun, was released on July 15, 2014, through Blue Note Records.

In 2014, Jones played with her label-mates including Jason Moran, John Patitucci, Brian Blade and Wayne Shorter in celebration of the 75th anniversary of Blue Note Records in the Concert Hall of John F. Kennedy Center for the Performing Arts. Later, Jones joined Mavis Staples for two songs at the Newport Folk Festival to celebrate Staples's 75th birthday.

Jones is featured on Harold Mabern's 2014 album Afro Blue, singing "Fools Rush In" and "Don't Misunderstand". On September 28, 2014, she appeared at the George Fest tribute concert to George Harrison in Los Angeles, where she sang "Something" and "Behind That Locked Door". Three days beforehand, Jones performed "Behind That Locked Door" live on the TBS television show Conan. Her performance at George Fest was included on the 2016 album and film release of the event.

Jones duets with The Rolling Stones' Keith Richards on the song "Illusions", from his 2015 album Crosseyed Heart.

On May 6, 2015, Jones sang "Don't Know Why" on The Late Show with David Letterman, as she had thirteen years before for her first appearance on the Letterman show. The episode was broadcast within two weeks of Letterman's retirement as host. During the same year, she sang "Little Bird" and "God Only Knows" at Brian Fest.

Jones donated her voice to the end credits song from the film A Dog Named Gucci, on the song "One Voice". The song also features singers Aimee Mann, Susanna Hoffs, Lydia Loveless, Neko Case, Kathryn Calder and Brian May. It was produced by Dean Falcone, who wrote the film's score. "One Voice" was released on Record Store Day, April 16, 2016, with profits from the sale of the single going to benefit animal charities.

In 2017, Jones recorded a rendition of "Unchained Melody", a song made famous by The Righteous Brothers, for Resistance Radio: The Man in the High Castle Album, a soundtrack to Amazon's The Man in the High Castle TV series. The song and soundtrack were produced by Danger Mouse, with whom Jones worked on her 2012 album, Little Broken Hearts.

Begin Again was released through Blue Note Records on April 12, 2019. The collection is a compilation of singles Jones recorded from 2018 to 2019, and includes collaborations with Jeff Tweedy and Thomas Bartlett. Jones planned to tour Australia and the US in support of the album, before cancelling shows due to the COVID-19 pandemic.

In 2020, Jones duetted with US jazz star Kandace Springs on the song "Angel Eyes" from her covers album The Women Who Raised Me.

From September 2022, Jones started a podcast called "Norah Jones Is Playing Along", where they played impromptu and improvised songs with a selection of guest artists including her half-sister Anoushka Shankar, as well as Dave Grohl, Marc Rebillet and more.

In 2023, Jones was featured on the single "Paradise II" from rapper Logic's eighth studio album, College Park.

In 2023, Jones collaborated with Icelandic musician Laufey on two Christmas tracks, recording a cover of "Have Yourself A Merry Little Christmas" and releasing an original song titled "Better Than Snow".

== Tours ==
- Come Away with Me Tour (2002–2004)
- Norah Jones & The Handsome Band Tour (2004–2005)
- Not Too Late Tour (2007–2008)
- The Fall Tour (2010)
- Little Broken Hearts Tour (2012–2013)
- Daybreaks World Tour (2016–2017)
- North American Tour (2019)
- Summer Tour (2022)
- Visions Tour (2024–2025)

== Personal life ==
Jones was in a relationship with bassist Lee Alexander from 2000 to 2007. After a period of estrangement from her father, Ravi Shankar, Jones traveled to New Delhi to spend time with him and wrote some material that was later recorded for the album The Fall. Jones has two children with her husband, keyboardist Pete Remm, to whom she has been married since 2014.

== Discography ==
Studio albums

- Come Away with Me (2002)
- Feels like Home (2004)
- Not Too Late (2007)
- The Fall (2009)
- Little Broken Hearts (2012)
- Day Breaks (2016)
- Pick Me Up Off the Floor (2020)
- I Dream of Christmas (2021)
- Visions (2024)

Collaborative albums

- New York City (with The Peter Malick Group) (2003)
- Here We Go Again: Celebrating the Genius of Ray Charles (with Willie Nelson and Wynton Marsalis) (2011)
- Rome (with Danger Mouse, Daniele Luppi and Jack White) (2011)
- Foreverly (with Billie Joe Armstrong) (2013)

== Filmography ==
List of television and film credits
Year	Title	Role	Notes
2002, 2004	Saturday Night Live	Herself / Musical Guest	"Robert De Niro/Norah Jones" (Season 28, Episode 7) "Colin Firth/Norah Jones" (Season 29, Episode 14)
2002	Two Weeks Notice	Herself	Cameo
2003	Dolly Parton: Platinum Blonde	Herself	Cameo / TV documentary
2003	100% NYC: Tribeca Film Festival	Herself	Cameo / TV documentary
2004, 2019	Sesame Street	Herself	"Snuffy's Invisible, Part 1" (Season 35, Episode 13) "Sesame Street's 50th Anniversary Celebration" (Special)
2007	My Blueberry Nights	Elizabeth (Lizzie/Beth)	Film Debut; Nominated – Cannes Film Festival for Palme d'Or
2007	Elvis: Viva Las Vegas	Herself	Cameo / TV documentary
2008	Life. Support. Music.	Herself	Cameo
2009	Wah Do Dem	Willow	
2009	30 Rock	Herself	"Kidney Now!" (Season 3, Episode 22)
2009	Tony Bennett: Duets II	Herself	Cameo / TV movie
2012	Ted	Herself	
2012	VH1 Storytellers	Herself / Performance	
2014	They Came Together	Herself	
2018	Echo in the Canyon	Herself	Cameo / Documentary
2019	Joni 75: A Birthday Celebration	Herself	Contributor / Concert Film
2024	In the Know	Herself	Guest star

== See also ==
- List of American Grammy Award winners and nominees
- Fry Street Fire – Norah Jones was an honorary Chairwoman of "Save Fry Street".
- Indians in the New York City metropolitan area
