= Little Broken Hearts =

2012 studio album by Norah Jones

Studio album by Norah Jones
- Released: April 25, 2012
- Recorded: 2011
- Studios: Mondo (Los Angeles); Electro Vox (Los Angeles)
- Genre: Indie pop
- Length: 45:01
- Label: Blue Note
- Producer: Danger Mouse

Norah Jones chronology
Rome (2011)	Little Broken Hearts (2012)	Foreverly (2013)

Singles from Little Broken Hearts
- 1. "Happy Pills" Released: March 6, 2012; 2. "Miriam" Released: July 25, 2012

Little Broken Hearts (stylized as ...Little Broken Hearts) is the fifth studio album by American singer and songwriter Norah Jones, released on April 25, 2012, by Blue Note Records. The album was produced by Brian Burton, better known as Danger Mouse, who is notable for his production work with the Black Keys, Gnarls Barkley, and Beck among others.

"Happy Pills" was released as the album's lead single on March 6, 2012. It reached number 13 on Billboard's Adult Contemporary chart and number 44 on the Hot Rock Songs chart. The second single, "Miriam", was released on July 25, 2012, and peaked at number 82 on the Japan Hot 100.

== Background ==
In 2009, Jones and Burton jammed in the Gnarls Barkley producer's Los Angeles studio to begin work on a project about which nobody knew. They spent the next two years working separately on other projects: she completed her fourth studio album The Fall, recorded another album with her old Alternative Country bandmates the Little Willies, which turned to For the Good Times. Burton started a new project Broken Bells with James Mercer, spending some time in studio with U2 and working on their 13th studio album and produced the Black Keys' seventh studio album, El Camino. The duo previously collaborated on the 2011 album Rome, on which she contributed vocals to the tracks "Season's Trees", "Black" and "Problem Queen". Soon after the project was completed, the two headed into the studio again to work on her fifth album.

In mid-2011, Jones and Burton reconvened at Burton's studio to finish Little Broken Hearts. At that time, Jones brought a handful of raw, emotionally charged new tunes she penned in the wake of a harsh breakup with her fiction-writer boyfriend. In an interview with Rolling Stone, she said, "I always heard the old stories about how you write better songs when you go through some shit. That sucks, but it's true!"

== Composition ==
Little Broken Hearts ranges from experimental chamber serenades to stark, electronic-embellished confessions. As Burton mentioned in his interview with Rolling Stone, this album is very different from anything Jones has ever done before.

Rolling Stone writer Matt Diehl pointed to the track "Take It Back" as Jones' boldest departure, which features fuzzed-out guitars and spooky, distorted vocals. On "4 Broken Hearts", he compared her to Dusty Springfield while confronting a mutual infidelity and, in the end, found a similarity between this record and Marvin Gaye's album Here, My Dear.

== Artwork and title ==
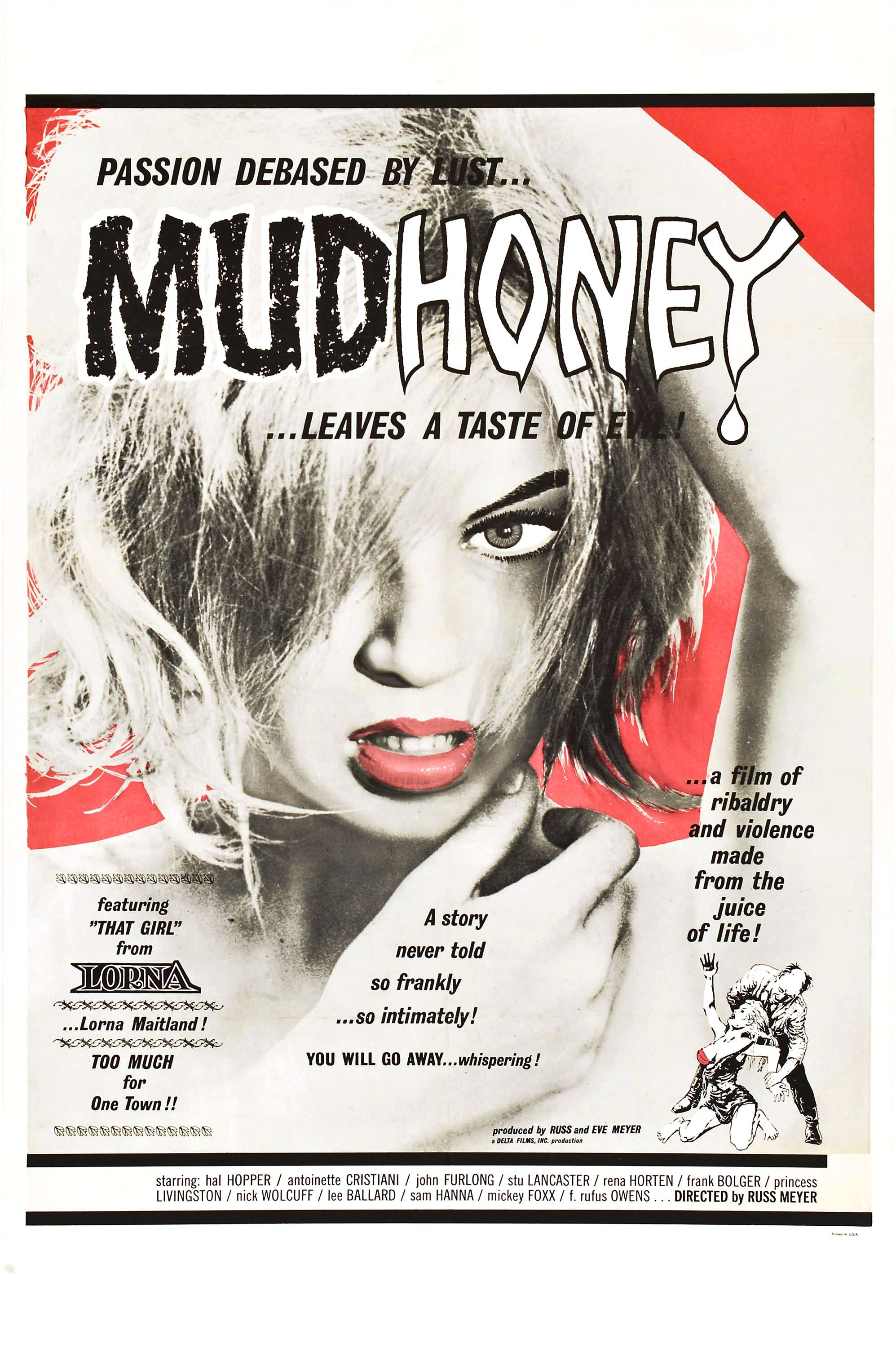
Jones portrayed herself as Clara Belle (Lorna Maitland) in the Mudhoney poster

The cover art for the album was inspired by the poster of the 1965 film Mudhoney. Jones was recording the album at Danger Mouse's studio and saw the poster on the wall. She said, "Brian has this great collection of Russ Meyer posters in his studio. And this particular one...was right over the couch where I sat every day. I always was looking at it and thinking 'that's so cool I want to look like her!' I remember staring at the poster the whole time we made the record. It's a great visual."

The photos for the album were taken by the photographer of Mad Men, Frank Ockenfels III, who worked with artists such as Fiona Apple and also Burton for his duo band with James Mercer, Broken Bells. The rest of the album design and directions were by Frank Harkins.

The title of the album (and most of the tracks) allude to a recent break-up.

== Promotion ==
On February 28, 2012, Jones premiered "Happy Pills", the first single from the album, via an announcement on her Facebook page on SoundCloud. After she announced that she will perform at the 2012 SXSW, she added that she would perform her new song at the show for the first time. "Happy Pills" was released on March 6, 2012. Days after premiering of "Happy Pills", on March 12, Jones uploaded "Travelin' On", another track from the album, on SoundCloud. On April 15, NPR uploaded the entire album for streaming online.

Jones performed in Germany on April 18, 2012, at the Alter Wartesaal—the old waiting room of Cologne's main station, Köln Hauptbahnhof—a concert that was presented by the WDR. It was broadcast on radio and the music television show Rockpalast (on May 21). On April 25, she appeared in Later... with Jools Holland show alongside Jack White, Alabama Shakes, Grimes, The Chieftains, Carolina Chocolate Drops and The Secret Sisters where she performed three songs of the album: "Say Goodbye", "Happy Pills" and "Little Broken Hearts".

Jones also announced some tour dates as promotion for the album. She was also a part of Gurtenfestival 2012 alongside artists such as Lenny Kravitz, Snow Patrol, Noel Gallagher's High Flying Birds, Friendly Fires and others. On August 10, 2012, she joined Foo Fighters, Franz Ferdinand, Beck, Metallica, Neil Young and Crazy Horse, Sigur Rós, Stevie Wonder, Skrillex and others for the 2012 Outside Lands Music and Arts Festival.

== Critical reception ==
Professional ratings
Aggregate scores
Source	Rating
Metacritic	69/100
Review scores
Source	Rating
AllMusic	3.5/5 stars
BBC Music	Favorable
The Daily Telegraph	4/5 stars
Entertainment Weekly	B
The Independent	4/5 stars
musicOMH	4/5 stars
New York Daily News	4/5 stars
PopMatters	7/10
Rolling Stone	3.5/5 stars
Spin	8/10

Little Broken Hearts received generally positive reviews from music critics. At Metacritic, which assigns a normalized rating out of 100 to reviews from mainstream critics, the album received an average score of 69 based on 27 reviews, indicating "generally favorable reviews". Stephen Thomas Erlewine of AllMusic rated the album three-and-a-half stars out of five and found that Jones and Burton are "well matched" and added: "Norah Jones may be pouring her heart out but it's been given an elegantly detailed sculpture that camouflages her pain. Listen closely and its evident, but it takes effort to ignore the alluring haze and hear the songs that lie beneath." American Songwriter's review was positive about the album, calling it "the most dramatic and rewarding departure she's [Jones] made in her career" and said: "Little Broken Hearts is her most commanding and compelling role yet." Robert Copsey of Digital Spy gave a positive review to the album and rated it four-stars-out-of-five, writing: "It might be dark, but this stunning collection of anguish is the brightest she's shined in a long time." Marcus J. Moore of BBC Music also gave a positive review to the album, mentioned she "never sounds too depressed on this set", and further expanded: "She keeps the mood fairly moderate amongst Burton's fluid soundtrack, setting the pace with a wry bravado that makes this album a dynamic listen." Maerz of Entertainment Weekly gave a B grade to the album and wrote: "With Brian Burton (a.k.a. Danger Mouse) producing, the heavy-lidded-vixen thing works for her here." Consequence of Sound critic Adam Kivel went in-depth on his review of the album, finally giving it three-and-a-half stars out of five and concluded: "This is a serious indie pop album. Jones and Burton have created something that should fit in the record collection of any Feist-loving indie kid just as easily as that of those soccer moms she won over years ago."

Although Mojo magazine was more critical about the album in its May 2012 issue, finding the duo unsuitable, but gave it a three-star-out-of-five write-up, concluding the album showed "An intriguing partnership that fails to entirely live up to expectations," but Uncut magazine was positive, giving the album three-and-a-half stars out of five and writing: "This is a bold and engaging revolution." Slant Magazine reviewer Jonathan Keefe also gave it a three-and-a-half star out of five and said: "Instead, by revealing some carefully chosen, deeply personal details and by building elaborate façades for the sake of drama, Jones has crafted her headiest, most complex album to date." Kitty Empire of The Guardian criticized the album and gave it a three-star-out-of-five, saying: "Mostly, though, Little Broken Hearts finds an effective way to grab the listener by the lapels: with kid gloves." Andy Gill of The Independent was very positive about the album, remarking: "There's always an ingenious, often unexpected, connection linking the music to the mood of a specific song," and gave it a four-out-of-five-star. However, Nick Coleman of The Independent on Sunday was more critical about the record, saying Jones' "strength as a singer comes not from the power of her voice but the detail of her phrasing" and gave it a three-star-out-of-five rating, labelling the album "dull". The Daily Telegraph writer Helen Brown was positive on the album, giving it four-out-of-five stars and wrote: "In the past decade, it seems Jones has made a sneaky transition from dinner party backdrop to David Lynch soundtrack."

MSN Music picked the album as Album of the Week and praised it with four-out-of-five star review, noting: "It may be a cliché, but Jones has proven that heartbreak makes good music." Jim Farber of New York Daily News was also positive about the album, writing it shows "[an] undeniably darker Norah than we've heard before", and gave it a four-out-of-five-star review, opining that: "True to its title, Little Broken Hearts amounts to an end-of-the-relationship concept album, told from the point of view of a woman in full control of her poisonous feelings. Unsurprisingly, Jones went through a break-up right before creating the music. To seal the mood, she came up with a sound as broodingly coherent as the soundtrack to a domestic drama." The Washington Post highlighted the opening track of the record, "Good Morning" and said: "Thematic albums are increasingly rare these days, good ones rarer still. Jones and Burton pull it off." The Boston Globe praised the album, saying: "There are enough good musical ideas here to keep the mind from wandering, and it brings her squarely into contemporary pop without sounding contrived." Greg Kot of the Chicago Tribune gave it a three-out-of-four star review and said: "There are enough good musical ideas here to keep the mind from wandering, and it brings her squarely into contemporary pop without sounding contrived." Andrew Burgess of musicOMH was positive, giving the album four-out-of-five stars and praised the team for the collaboration and remarked: "The team assembled here have done something quite remarkable, and this new-found partnership between Jones and Burton could perhaps lead to some very fine collaborations on future albums." Rolling Stone reviewer Will Hermes said "her [Jones'] fifth album is a brand-rejigging songwriting collab with Brian "Danger Mouse" Burton that both picks up her pace and pumps up her palette," awarding it three-and-a-half stars out of five and closed the review with: "even good girls need revenge sometimes." Enio Chiola of PopMatters also gave a positive review of the album, scored it as seven out of ten, praised Jones for her writing skill and said: "Instead of picking apart the tracks that work best, the entire album plays like a cohesive whole, somehow frayed and fragmented if not left intact." Spin's review was very positive, scoring it as eight out of ten and writing: "Little Broken Hearts is exciting because it explores the darkest corners of betrayal, bad love, and jealousy with enough vitality to propel Jones out of the bloodless purgatory of brunch music." Andrea Warner of Exclaim! was also very positive, noting: "This Norah Jones is damaged, dangerous and vulnerable, and Burton's mastery of sound helps deepen the relationship between listener and song."

== Commercial performance ==
Little Broken Hearts debuted at number two on the Billboard 200, selling 110,000 copies in its first week of release. It is Jones' fifth studio album to reach the top three and just her second album not to debut atop the chart. The album's debut sales week is the smallest for any of her studio albums since her first, Come Away with Me (2002), which sold 10,000 copies in its first week. The album dropped to number five the following week, selling 60,000 copies. In its third week, the album stayed at number five with sales of 45,000 copies, and dropped to number 10 in its fourth week with 28,000 copies sold. Little Broken Hearts had sold 385,000 copies in the United States as of December 2012.

The album entered the Canadian Albums Chart at number two, selling 13,200 copies in its first week of release. Little Broken Hearts debuted at number four on the UK Albums Chart with first-week sales of 15,988 copies. In Japan, it debuted at number five with 13,278 copies sold, and had sold 73,041 copies there by the end of 2012. The album debuted at number two on the French Albums Chart with first-week sales of 15,527 copies.

== Track listing ==
All tracks are written by Norah Jones and Brian Burton.

No.	Title	Length
1.	"Good Morning"	3:17
2.	"Say Goodbye"	3:27
3.	"Little Broken Hearts"	3:12
4.	"She's 22"	3:10
5.	"Take It Back"	4:05
6.	"After the Fall"	3:42
7.	"4 Broken Hearts"	2:59
8.	"Travelin' On"	3:06
9.	"Out on the Road"	3:28
10.	"Happy Pills"	3:34
11.	"Miriam"	4:22
12.	"All a Dream"	6:29
Total length:		45:01

Japanese edition bonus track
No.	Title	Length
13.	"I Don't Wanna Hear Another Sound"	3:33

2023 Japanese deluxe edition bonus tracks & remixes (SHM-CD)
No.	Title	Length
13.	"Killing Time"	3:41
14.	"I Don't Wanna Hear Another Sound"	3:34
15.	"Out on the Road" (Mondo version)	3:22
16.	"Miriam" (Peter Bjorn and John remix)	4:15
17.	"Good Morning" (David Andrew Sitek remix)	6:38
18.	"She's 22" (David Andrew Sitek remix)	3:47
19.	"Take It Back" (David Andrew Sitek remix)	4:39
20.	"After the Fall" (David Andrew Sitek remix)	4:11

Target exclusive edition and Canadian deluxe edition bonus disc
No.	Title	Length
1.	"I Don't Wanna Hear Another Sound"	3:33
2.	"Killing Time"	3:41
3.	"Out on the Road" (Mondo version)	3:20
Total length:		10:33

French deluxe edition bonus disc
No.	Title	Length
1.	"Say Goodbye" (live)	3:19
2.	"Take It Back" (live)	4:24
3.	"Little Broken Hearts" (live)	3:24
4.	"It's Gonna Be" (live)	3:28
5.	"All a Dream" (live)	6:06
6.	"Miriam" (live)	4:47
7.	"Happy Pills" (live)	3:42
8.	"Black" (live)	3:32
9.	"What Am I to You" (live)	3:59
10.	"Don't Know Why" (live)	4:13
11.	"Sinkin' Soon" (live)	4:57

2023 Japan deluxe edition Live at Austin City Limits 2012 disc (SHM-CD)
No.	Title	Length
1.	"Good Morning" (live)	3:20
2.	"Say Goodbye" (live)	3:32
3.	"Little Broken Hearts" (live)	3:36
4.	"She's 22" (live)	3:26
5.	"Take It Back" (live)	4:27
6.	"After the Fall" (live)	3:55
7.	"Out on the Road" (live)	3:44
8.	"Happy Pills" (live)	3:41
9.	"Miriam" (live)	4:35
10.	"All a Dream" (live)	6:09
11.	"Black" (live)	3:32

== Personnel ==
Credits adapted from the liner notes of Little Broken Hearts.

=== Musicians ===
- Norah Jones – vocals (all tracks), guitar (tracks 1, 2, 4), Rhodes electric piano (1, 7), piano (2, 4, 5, 7, 9–12), Wurlitzer electric piano (2, 5), bass (2), electric guitar (3, 5, 7, 10, 12), acoustic guitar (3, 11), organ (4)
- Brian Burton – synthesizer (1–6, 10, 12), organ (1, 6), acoustic guitar (1, 8), electric guitar (2, 3, 5, 7, 9), drums (2, 3, 5, 7, 10), percussion (3), string arrangements (5, 6, 11, 12), piano (6), bass, programming (12)
- Blake Mills – electric guitar (1, 3–7, 9–12), acoustic guitar (7, 9, 12)
- Gus Seyffert – bass (3, 5–7, 9, 11, 12), electric guitar (5, 7), backing vocals (5)
- Joey Waronker – drums (6, 7, 9, 11, 12), percussion (7, 11, 12)
- Heather McIntosh – cello and cello arrangements (1, 8), bass (8)
- Sonus Quartet (Caroline Campbell, Alwyn Wright, Juan Miguel Hernandez-Hachez, Vanessa Freebairn-Smith) – strings (5, 6, 11, 12)
- Dan Elkan – electric guitar (10)
- Todd Monfalcone – electric guitar (10)
- Jonathan Hischke – bass (10)

=== Technical personnel ===
- Danger Mouse (Brian Burton) – production
- Kennie Takahashi and Todd Monfalcone – recording engineers
- Kennie Takahashi – mixing engineer
- Tom Schick – additional engineering (track 12)
- Valente Torrez, Masahiro Tsuzuki – assistant engineers (12)
- Greg Calbi – mastering
- Vanessa Freebairn-Smith – score preparation
- Zach Hochkeppel – product management
- Gordon H. Jee – creative direction
- Frank Harkins – art direction, design
- Frank W. Ockenfels III – photography

== Charts ==
=== Weekly charts ===
Weekly chart performance for Little Broken Hearts
Chart (2012)	Peak position
Australian Albums (ARIA)	5
Austrian Albums (Ö3 Austria)	1
Belgian Albums (Ultratop Flanders)	1
Belgian Albums (Ultratop Wallonia)	2
Canadian Albums (Billboard)	2
Croatian Albums (HDU)	5
Czech Albums (ČNS IFPI)	3
Danish Albums (Hitlisten)	2
Dutch Albums (Album Top 100)	3
Finnish Albums (Suomen virallinen lista)	7
French Albums (SNEP)	2
German Albums (Offizielle Top 100)	3
Greek Albums (IFPI)	13
Hungarian Albums (MAHASZ)	8
Irish Albums (IRMA)	12
Italian Albums (FIMI)	3
Japanese Albums (Oricon)	5
Mexican Albums (Top 100 Mexico)	53
New Zealand Albums (RMNZ)	11
Norwegian Albums (VG-lista)	3
Polish Albums (ZPAV)	5
Portuguese Albums (AFP)	15
Russian Albums (2M)	12
Scottish Albums (Official Charts)	6
South Korean Albums (Gaon)	8
Spanish Albums (Promusicae)	11
Swedish Albums (Sverigetopplistan)	4
Swedish Jazz Albums (Sverigetopplistan)	1
Swiss Albums (Schweizer Hitparade)	1
UK Albums (Official Charts)	4
US Billboard 200	2
US Top Rock Albums (Billboard)	1

=== Year-end charts ===
Year-end chart performance for Little Broken Hearts
Chart (2012)	Position
Austrian Albums (Ö3 Austria)	50
Belgian Albums (Ultratop Flanders)	28
Belgian Albums (Ultratop Wallonia)	18
Canadian Albums (Billboard)	46
Danish Albums (Hitlisten)	48
Dutch Albums (Album Top 100)	99
French Albums (SNEP)	51
Hungarian Albums (MAHASZ)	81
Japanese Albums (Oricon)	96
South Korean International Albums (Gaon)	29
Swedish Albums (Sverigetopplistan)	78
Swiss Albums (Schweizer Hitparade)	33
US Billboard 200	73
US Top Rock Albums (Billboard)	23

== Certifications and sales ==
Certifications and sales for Little Broken Hearts
Region	Certification	Certified units/sales
Belgium (BRMA)	Gold	15,000^{*}
Canada (Music Canada)	Gold	40,000^{^}
France (SNEP)	Gold	70,000
Japan	—	73,041
South Korea	—	3,661
United Kingdom	—	44,090
United States (RIAA)	Gold	500,000^{‡}
Summaries
Worldwide	—	1,000,000
^{*} Sales figures based on certification alone.^{^} Shipments figures based on certification alone.^{‡} Sales+streaming figures based on certification alone.

== Release history ==
Release history for Little Broken Hearts
Region	Date	Edition	Label	Ref.
Japan	April 25, 2012	Standard	EMI	
Australia	April 27, 2012	Standard	EMI	
Germany	April 27, 2012	Standard	EMI	
France	April 30, 2012	Standard	EMI	
United Kingdom	April 30, 2012	Standard	Blue Note; Parlophone	
Canada	May 1, 2012	Standard; deluxe	EMI	
United States	May 1, 2012	Standard	Blue Note	
France	November 26, 2012	Deluxe	EMI	
Worldwide	June 2, 2023	Deluxe (CD, LP)	UMC	
