= Fry Street Fire =

Fire-Related Disaster

Coordinates: 33.2152°N 97.1453°W

On June 27, 2007 the Historic Fry Street area of Denton, Texas burned down. The area referred to as "Fry Street" is the area between Fry St/Welch St and Oak St/Hickory St. The Tomato, a local pizza place frequented by University of North Texas and Texas Womans University students, was the primary target damaged by the fire but the entire block was demolished by police and firefighters before the next morning. The fire took place the day before the scheduled date for the building's demolition. The area had been at the center of a contentious battle between Save Fry Street and United Equities Inc.

== Background ==
Houston based developer United Equities Inc. bought most of the commercial lots on and around Fry Street, with plans to raze them in exchange for "upscale" businesses. On May 10, 2006 word began to spread around town of the purchase, and students began to organize a group called Save Fry Street with flyers and the Internet. Protests by residents and current and former University of North Texas students angered by plans to raze and redevelop the area began and would last over a year until the fire.

The Tomato restaurant closed on May 13, 2007 along with Bagheri's Italian Restaurant, Java Flakes, Texas Jive, Naranja Cafe, the Spirit Station and Andy's Hair Spot. On June 22–23, Habitat for Humanity of Denton County hosted an auction of building materials salvaged from buildings slated for demolition. Overnight, vandals defaced a 1980s-era mural, portions of which had been auctioned off for $1,600. On June 25, workers began to clear the buildings, ripping out the insides. Local protesters began to squat inside the emptied-out Tomato, despite the organization "Save Fry Street" asking protesters not to do so.

== The fire ==
The Fry Street Fire was set around 11 p.m. Hundreds of students were at the bars in the area, and watched the fire. More students gathered after the news had reached them. The 22-year-old man accused of torching The Tomato in protest of the redevelopment surrendered to fire marshals and posted bail on July 11, 2007.
