= Larry Klein discography =

Larry Klein (born 1956) is an American musician, songwriter, record and soundtrack producer, and head of Strange Cargo, an imprint with Universal Music Group.

== Musician discography ==
As bass player:

=== 2020s ===
- 2021: Triage - Rodney Crowell
- 2021: The Fool & the Scorpion - Sharon Corr
- 2020: Sunset in the Blue - Melody Gardot
- 2020: Music... The Air That I Breathe - Cliff Richard

=== 2010s ===
- 2019: Higher Ground - Jon Regen
- 2018: Anthem - Madeleine Peyroux
- 2017: A Woman's Work - Jude Johnstone
- 2014: Rumours of Glory - Bruce Cockburn
- 2013: What's Left Is Forever - Thomas Dybdahl
- 2013: The Vehicle - Marcella Detroit
- 2012: Mr. Bad Example / Mutineer – Warren Zevon
- 2012: Slingshot – Rebecca Pidgeon
- 2011: Pinnacle: Live & Unreleased from Keystone Korner – Freddie Hubbard
- 2010: Be My Thrill – The Weepies
- 2010: Rounder Records 40th Anniversary Concert
- 2010: Synthesis – Raul Midón
- 2010: The Imagine Project – Herbie Hancock
- 2010: The Singer Songwriter Collection – Amy Grant

=== 2000s ===
- 2009: Bare Bones – Madeleine Peyroux
- 2009: Last Kiss – Zachary Richard
- 2009: My One and Only Thrill – Melody Gardot
- 2009: My One and Only Thrill / Live in Paris EP – Melody Gardot
- 2009: Tide – Luciana Souza
- 2008: Behind the Velvet Curtain – Rebecca Pidgeon
- 2008: Christmas & Hits Duos – Aaron Neville
- 2008: Circus Money – Walter Becker
- 2008: Crazy Love – Jackie Bristow
- 2007: Close to Dark – Brandi Shearer
- 2007: Heavenly Voices [Angel] – Ryland Angel
- 2007: I Love You – Diana Ross
- 2007: King Kong – Les Deux Love Orchestra
- 2007: Notes from Whistler – Alessandro Alessandroni
- 2007: River: The Joni Letters – Herbie Hancock
- 2007: Shine – Joni Mitchell
- 2007: Siren – Sasha & Shawna
- 2006: Dreaming Through the Noise – Vienna Teng
- 2006: Life Less Ordinary – Mindi Abair
- 2006: Wicked Little High – Bird York
- 2005: Anthology: The Soul-Jazz Fusion Years 66–82 – Freddie Hubbard
- 2005: Chronicles – Cher
- 2005: Joni Mitchell Special Edition – Joni Mitchell
- 2005: Songs Chosen by Her Friends & Fellow Musicians – Joni Mitchell
- 2005: Songs for Sanity – John 5
- 2005: Songs of a Prairie Girl – Joni Mitchell
- 2005: That's Live – Julia Fordham
- 2005: Tough on Crime – Rebecca Pidgeon
- 2004: California – Wilson Phillips
- 2004: Dreamland – Joni Mitchell
- 2004: Footprints: The Life and Music of Wayne Shorter – Wayne Shorter
- 2004: Play the Videos – Peter Gabriel
- 2004: That's Life – Julia Fordham
- 2004: The Beginning of Survival – Joni Mitchell
- 2004: The Essential Rodney Crowell – Rodney Crowell
- 2003: Hit – Peter Gabriel
- 2003: The Complete Geffen Recordings – Joni Mitchell
- 2003: Tranquil Moods [Delta Box]
- 2003: Tranquil Moods: Forever Friends – Justo Almario
- 2003: Tranquil Moods: Prelude – Justo Almario
- 2003: The Velvet Hour – Bird York
- 2002: Anything Anytime Anywhere (Singles 1979–2002) – Bruce Cockburn
- 2002: Concrete Love – Julia Fordham
- 2002: Genius: The Best of Warren Zevon – Warren Zevon
- 2002: Small Worlds: The Crowell Collection 1978–1995 – Rodney Crowell
- 2002: Sweet Is the Melody – Aselin Debison
- 2002: The Essential Kenny Loggins – Kenny Loggins
- 2001: Collection – Tracy Chapman
- 2001: Greatest Hurts: The Best of Jann Arden – Jann Arden
- 2001: Sweet November [Original Soundtrack]
- 2001: The Best of Mary Black, Vol. 2 – Mary Black
- 2001: The Best of Sessions at West 54th, Vol. 1
- 2000: More Songs from Pooh Corner – Kenny Loggins
- 2000: Red Room – Christopher Cross
- 2000: Telling Stories – Tracy Chapman

=== 1990s ===
- 1999: Felicity
- 1999: Grass Roots: Musical Influences & Inspiration – Ashley Beedle
- 1999: Hurlyburly – David Baerwald
- 1999: Painting with Words and Music – Joni Mitchell
- 1999: Slowing Down the World – Chris Botti
- 1998: Adam Cohen – Adam Cohen
- 1998: Blender – Murmurs
- 1998: Taming the Tiger – Joni Mitchell
- 1998: Touched by an Angel: The Album
- 1997: Behind the Eyes – Amy Grant
- 1997: Monterey Jazz Festival: 40 Legendary Years
- 1997: One and Only – Mary Black
- 1997: Pristine Smut – Murmurs
- 1997: Shine – Mary Black
- 1996: Breathe – Midge Ure
- 1996: Hits – Joni Mitchell
- 1996: I'll Sleep When I'm Dead (An Anthology) – Warren Zevon
- 1996: Keystone Bop Vol. 2: Friday & Saturday – Freddie Hubbard
- 1996: Misses – Joni Mitchell
- 1996: Susanna Hoffs – Susanna Hoffs
- 1996: Tender City – Joy Askew
- 1995: Heart of Us All – Karen Lehner
- 1995: Mutineer – Warren Zevon
- 1995: Randy Newman's Faust – Randy Newman
- 1995: Rare on Air, Vol. 2
- 1995: Refuge of the Roads [Pioneer] – Joni Mitchell
- 1995: Till the Night is Gone: A Tribute to Doc Pomus
- 1995: Tower of Song: The Songs of Leonard Cohen
- 1994: Cover Girl – Shawn Colvin
- 1994: Falling Forward – Julia Fordham
- 1994: The Divine Comedy – Milla
- 1994: Turbulent Indigo – Joni Mitchell
- 1993: Greatest Hits – Rodney Crowell
- 1993: Made in America [Original Soundtrack]
- 1993: River of Souls – Dan Fogelberg
- 1993: Up on the Roof: Songs from the Brill Building – Neil Diamond
- 1992: Fat City – Shawn Colvin
- 1992: Rendezvous – Christopher Cross
- 1992: King of Hearts – Roy Orbison
- 1992: Life Is Messy – Rodney Crowell
- 1992: Matters of the Heart – Tracy Chapman
- 1992: Out of the Cradle – Lindsey Buckingham
- 1992: The Best of Freddie Hubbard [Pablo] – Freddie Hubbard
- 1991: Love Hurts – Cher
- 1991: Night Ride Home – Joni Mitchell
- 1991: Nothing But a Burning Light – Bruce Cockburn
- 1991: Robin Hood: Prince of Thieves – Michael Kamen
- 1991: Swept – Julia Fordham
- 1991: The Force Behind the Power – Diana Ross
- 1991: Warm Your Heart – Aaron Neville
- 1990: Laura Branigan – Laura Branigan
- 1990: Shaking the Tree: Sixteen Golden Greats – Peter Gabriel
- 1990: Shortstop – Sara Hickman

=== 1980s ===
- 1989: Big Harvest – Indio
- 1989: Crossroads – Tracy Chapman
- 1989: Double Dose – The Heart of Gold Band
- 1989: March – Michael Penn
- 1989: Rock, Rhythm & Blues
- 1989: The End of the Innocence – Don Henley
- 1988: Chalk Mark in a Rain Storm – Joni Mitchell
- 1988: Down in the Groove – Bob Dylan
- 1988: Tracy Chapman – Tracy Chapman
- 1987: All Systems Go – Donna Summer
- 1987: Cher [1987] – Cher
- 1987: Exiles – Dan Fogelberg
- 1987: Plumbline – Justo Almario
- 1987: Robbie Robertson – Robbie Robertson
- 1987: What If – What If
- 1986: So – Peter Gabriel
- 1985: Dog Eat Dog – Joni Mitchell
- 1985: Forever Friends – Justo Almario
- 1984: Building the Perfect Beast – Don Henley
- 1984: Read My Lips – Fee Waybill
- 1983: Best of Live and in Studio – Freddie Hubbard
- 1982: Bobby McFerrin – Bobby McFerrin
- 1982: Born to Be Blue – Freddie Hubbard
- 1982: Keystone Bop – Freddie Hubbard
- 1982: Promontory Rider: A Retrospective Collection – Robert Hunter
- 1982: Wild Things Run Fast – Joni Mitchell
- 1981: A Little Night Music – Freddie Hubbard
- 1981: Keystone Bop: Sunday Night – Freddie Hubbard
- 1981: Rollin' – Freddie Hubbard
- 1980: Live at the North Sea Jazz Festival – Freddie Hubbard

=== 1970s ===
- 1979: City Dreams – David Pritchard
- 1979: Skagly – Freddie Hubbard
- 1978: Light–Year – David Pritchard
- 1976: Kellee – Kellee Patterson

== Production discography ==
As record producer:

=== 2020s ===
- 2021: The Fool & the Scorpion - Sharon Corr
- 2020: Music... The Air That I Breathe - Cliff Richard
- 2020: Lang Lang at the Movies - Lang Lang
- 2020: C'est Magnifique - Melody Gardot
- 2020: Sunset in the Blue - Melody Gardot
- 2020: The Woman Who Raised Me - Kandace Springs

=== 2010s ===
- 2018: Junk - Hailey Tuck
- 2018: The Capitol Studios Sessions - Jeff Goldblum & Mildred Snitzer Orchestra
- 2018: The Book Of Longing - Luciana Souza
- 2016: Soul Eyes - Kandace Springs
- 2020: Currency of Man - Melody Gardot
- 2015: Moura - Ana Moura
- 2015: Freedom & Surrender - Lizz Wright
- 2015: Tenderness - JD Souther
- 2014: Map to the Treasure: Reimagining Laura Nyro - Billy Childs
- 2013: The Blue Room - Madeleine Peyroux
- 2012: Desfado - Ana Moura
- 2012: Duos III - Luciana Souza
- 2012: Let's Go Out Tonight - Curtis Stigers
- 2012: Playlist: The Very Best of Rodney Crowell
- 2012: Playlist: The Very Best of Starship - Starship
- 2012: Slingshot - Rebecca Pidgeon
- 2012: The Book of Chet - Luciana Souza
- 2012: The Essential - Starship
- 2010: ...Featuring Norah Jones - Norah Jones
- 2010: Crazy
- 2010: Synthesis - Raul Midón
- 2010: The Rounder Records Story

=== 2000s ===
- 2009: Bare Bones - Madeleine Peyroux
- 2009: Last Kiss - Zachary Richard
- 2009: My One and Only Thrill - Melody Gardot
- 2009: My One and Only Thrill / Live in Paris EP - Melody Gardot
- 2009: The Queer as Folk: Ultimate Threesome
- 2008: Behind the Velvet Curtain - Rebecca Pidgeon
- 2008: Circus Money - Walter Becker
- 2008: Our Bright Future - Tracy Chapman
- 2008: Rio - Till Brönner
- 2008: The Women [Original Soundtrack]
- 2008: Then and Now: The Definitive Herbie Hancock - Herbie Hancock
- 2007: Close to Dark - Brandi Shearer
- 2007: Give US Your Poor
- 2007: River: The Joni Letters - Herbie Hancock
- 2007: The New Bossa Nova - Luciana Souza
- 2006: Dreaming Through the Noise - Vienna Teng
- 2006: Eclectic Café: The Complete Coffee House Collection
- 2006: Greatest Hits - Huey Lewis and the News
- 2006: Half the Perfect World - Madeleine Peyroux
- 2006: Lucky You
- 2006: Oceana - Till Brönner
- 2006: Wicked Little High - Bird York
- 2005: Brokeback Mountain [Original Motion Picture Soundtrack] - Gustavo Santaolalla
- 2005: Crash: Music from and Inspired by Crash
- 2005: Dance Me to the End of Love - Madeleine Peyroux
- 2005: Kiss Me Goodbye - Johnathan Rice
- 2005: Must Love Dogs
- 2005: Queer as Folk: The Final Season
- 2005: Songs Chosen by Her Friends & Fellow Musicians - Joni Mitchell
- 2005: Songs of a Prairie Girl - Joni Mitchell
- 2005: Sweetheart: Love Songs [2005]
- 2005: That's Live - Julia Fordham
- 2005: Tough on Crime - Rebecca Pidgeon
- 2004: Careless Love - Madeleine Peyroux
- 2004: Dreamland - Joni Mitchell
- 2004: Platinum & Gold Collection - Starship
- 2004: Polaroids: A Greatest Hits Collection - Shawn Colvin
- 2004: That's Life - Julia Fordham
- 2004: The Beginning of Survival - Joni Mitchell
- 2004: The Essential Rodney Crowell - Rodney Crowell
- 2004: Then: Totally Oldies '80s Again, Vol. 7
- 2003: Love Actually
- 2003: The Best of Mary Black: 1991-2001 - Mary Black
- 2003: The Complete Geffen Recordings - Joni Mitchell
- 2003: The Velvet Hour - Bird York
- 2002: Concrete Love - Julia Fordham
- 2002: Small Worlds: The Crowell Collection 1978-1995 - Rodney Crowell
- 2002: Travelogue - Joni Mitchell
- 2002: Wake up with You (The I Wanna Song) [Remixes] - Julia Fordham
- 2001: Sweet November [Original Soundtrack]
- 2001: The Best of Mary Black, Vol. 2 - Mary Black
- 2000: Both Sides Now - Joni Mitchell
- 2000: Duets [Original Soundtrack]
- 2000: The Best of Holly Cole - Holly Cole
- 2000: VH1 Behind the Music: The Jefferson Airplane Collection - Jefferson Airplane

=== 1990s ===
- 1999: Collection - Julia Fordham
- 1999: Felicity
- 1999: Night in a Strange Town - Lynn Miles
- 1999: Slowing Down the World - Chris Botti
- 1999: Torture Garden: Bizarre & Eccentric Music Compilation
- 1998: Blender - Murmurs
- 1998: From There to Here - Kyle Eastwood
- 1998: Touched by an Angel: The Album
- 1997: All Over Me
- 1997: Dear Dark Heart - Holly Cole
- 1997: One and Only - Mary Black
- 1997: Pristine Smut - Murmurs
- 1997: Shine - Mary Black
- 1997: Take a Run at the Sun - Dinosaur Jr.
- 1996: Grace of My Heart
- 1996: Party of Five [Original TV Soundtrack]
- 1996: Hits – Joni Mitchell
- 1996: Misses – Joni Mitchell
- 1995: Super Hits - Rodney Crowell
- 1995: White Rabbit - Murmurs
- 1994: Falling Forward - Julia Fordham
- 1994: It Could Happen to You
- 1994: Murmurs - Murmurs
- 1994: Turbulent Indigo - Joni Mitchell
- 1993: Greatest Hits - Rodney Crowell
- 1993: The Best of Starship [RCA/BMG Special Products] - Starship
- 1992: Fat City - Shawn Colvin
- 1992: Life Is Messy - Rodney Crowell
- 1991: Greatest Hits (Ten Years and Change 1979-1991) - Starship
- 1991: Night Ride Home - Joni Mitchell
- 1991: Umbrella - The Innocence Mission
- 1990: Bedtime Stories - David Baerwald

=== 1980s ===
- 1989: Big Harvest - Indio
- 1989: The Innocence Mission - The Innocence Mission
- 1988: Chalk Mark in a Rain Storm - Joni Mitchell
- 1988: Out of the Silence - Dare
- 1987: No Protection / Love Among the Cannibals - Starship
- 1986: The Lace - Benjamin Orr
- 1985: Dog Eat Dog - Joni Mitchell

== Film and TV ==
=== 2000s ===
- 2009: Being Erica: "What Goes Up Must Come Down" - TV Episode Soundtrack
- 2009: Just Like Me - Film Soundtrack
- 2009: The Answer Man - Film Soundtrack
- 2008: The Women – Film Soundtrack
- 2008: Crazy – Film Soundtrack
- 2007: Lucky You – Film Soundtrack
- 2006: Last Holiday – Film Soundtrack
- 2005: Monster-in-Law – Film Soundtrack
- 2001: Heartbreakers – Film Soundtrack
- 2001: Sweet November (2001 film) – Film Soundtrack
- 2000: Duets – Film Soundtrack
- 2000: An All-Star Tribute to Joni Mitchell - TV
- 2000: Felicity: "Things Change (#2.15)" - TV Episode
- 2000: Felicity: "True Colors (#2.14)" - TV Episode
- 2000: Felicity: "Truth or Consequences (#2.13)" - TV Episode

=== 1990s ===
- 1999: Felicity: "Portraits (#2.9)" - TV Episode
- 1999: Felicity: "Family Affairs (#2.8)"- TV Episode
- 1999: Felicity: "Getting Lucky (#2.7)" - TV Episode
- 1999: Felicity: "The Love Bug (#2.6)" - TV Episode
- 1999: Felicity: "Crash (#2.5)" - TV Episode
- 1999: Felicity: "Ancient History (#2.3)" - TV Episode
- 1999: Felicity: "The List (#2.2)" - TV Episode
- 1999: Felicity: "Sophomoric (#2.1)" - TV Episode
- 1999: Felicity: "Felicity Was Here (#1.22)" - TV Episode
- 1999: Felicity: "The Force (#1.21)" - TV Episode
- 1999: Sugar Town - Soundtrack
- 1999: Felicity: "Gimme an O! (#1.11)" - TV Episode
- 1998: Felicity: "Finally (#1.10)" - TV Episode
- 1998: Felicity: "Thanksgiving (#1.9)" - TV Episode
- 1998: Felicity: "Drawing the Line: Part 2 (#1.8)" - TV Episode
- 1998: Felicity: "Cheating (#1.6)" - TV Episode
- 1998: Felicity: "Spooked (#1.5)" - TV Episode
- 1998: Felicity: "Boggled (#1.4)" - TV Episode
- 1998: Felicity: "The Last Stand (#1.2)" - TV Episode
- 1998: Felicity: - TV series soundtrack
- 1998: Hurlyburly – Film Soundtrack
- 1996: Grace of My Heart – Film Soundtrack
- 1995: Clockwork Mice – Film Soundtrack
- 1994: It Could Happen to You - Film Soundtrack
- 1991: Highlander II: The Quickening - Film Soundtrack
- 1990: 3 Men and a Little Lady – Film Soundtrack

=== 1980s ===
- 1980: Raging Bull - Film Soundtrack

== Songwriter discography ==
=== 2010s ===
- 2018: Anthem - Madeleine Peyroux
- 2018: All These Things - Thomas Dybdahl
- 2015: Tenderness - JD Souther
- 2015: Freedom & Surrender - Lizz Wright
- 2014: No Small Thing - J-Mood
- 2013: What's Left Is Forever - Thomas Dybdahl
- 2012: Something To Believe In - Anna Bergendahl
- 2012: Slingshot – Rebecca Pidgeon

=== 2000s ===
- 2009: Last Kiss - Zachary Richard
- 2009: Tide - Luciana Souza
- 2009: Bare Bones - Madeleine Peyroux
- 2008: Circus Money - Walter Becker
- 2007: The New Bossa Nova – Luciana Souza
- 2006: Half the Perfect World - Madeleine Peyroux
- 2006: Oceana - Till Brönner
- 2004: Careless Love - Madeleine Peyroux
- 2002: I Just Want To Feel Love – Jackie Bristow
- 2002: That's Life – Julia Fordham
- 2002: Roadside Angel – Julia Fordham

=== 1990s ===
- 1999: Slowing Down the World (2 songs) – Chris Botti
- 1998: Fundamental Things (1 Song) – Bonnie Raitt
- 1992: Fat City – Shawn Colvin
- 1991: Night Ride Home - Joni Mitchell
- 1990: Bedtime Stories - David Baerwald

=== 1980s ===
- 1988: Chalk Mark in a Rain Storm - Joni Mitchell
- 1985: Dog Eat Dog - Joni Mitchell
