= Joni's Jazz =

Box set by Joni Mitchell
- Released: September 5, 2025
- Genre: Jazz
- Label: Rhino

Joni Mitchell chronology
Joni Mitchell Archives – Vol. 4: The Asylum Years (1976–1980) (2024)	Joni's Jazz (2025)

Singles from Joni's Jazz
- 1. "Be Cool (demo)" Released: June 25, 2025; 2. "Moon at the Window (demo)" Released: July 25, 2025

Joni's Jazz is a box set by Canadian musician Joni Mitchell. It was released on September 5, 2025, through Rhino Entertainment. The collection contains 61 tracks with an emphasis on Mitchell's material in the jazz genre, including her collaborations with Wayne Shorter (to whom the set is dedicated), Jaco Pastorius, Herbie Hancock, and Charles Mingus. The set spans Mitchell's debut album Song to a Seagull (1968) to her 2022 live performance at the Newport Folk Festival. A previously unreleased demo of "Be Cool" was released alongside the announcement of the collection on June 25, 2025.

== Track listing ==
All tracks are written by Joni Mitchell, except where noted.

Disc one
No.	Title	Writer(s)	Original release	Length
1.	"Blue"		Blue, 1971
2.	"Trouble Man" (with Kyle Eastwood)	Marvin Gaye	From There to Here by Kyle Eastwood, 1998
3.	"Moon at the Window" (demo)		previously unreleased	3:26
4.	"Be Cool" (demo)		previously unreleased	3:36
5.	"Harlem in Havana"		Taming the Tiger, 1998
6.	"Cherokee Louise"		Night Ride Home, 1991
7.	"Come in from the Cold"		Night Ride Home
8.	"In France They Kiss on Main Street"		The Hissing of Summer Lawns, 1975
9.	"Nothing Can Be Done"	Mitchell; Larry Klein	Night Ride Home
10.	"Sex Kills"		Turbulent Indigo, 1994
11.	"Edith and the Kingpin"		The Hissing of Summer Lawns
12.	"Cold Blue Steel and Sweet Fire"		For the Roses, 1972
13.	"The Jungle Line"		The Hissing of Summer Lawns
14.	"Shades of Scarlett Conquering"		The Hissing of Summer Lawns
15.	"Yvette in English"	Mitchell; David Crosby	Turbulent Indigo
16.	"Marcie"		Song to a Seagull, 1968
17.	"A Bird That Whistles"		Chalk Mark in a Rain Storm, 1988

Disc two
No.	Title	Writer(s)	Original release	Length
1.	"Love"		Wild Things Run Fast, 1982
2.	"Comes Love"	Lew Brown; Sam H. Stept; Charles Tobias	Both Sides Now, 2000
3.	"The Man I Love" (with Herbie Hancock)	George Gershwin; Ira Gershwin	Gershwin's World by Herbie Hancock, 1998
4.	"At Last"	Mack Gordon; Harry Warren	Both Sides Now
5.	"You're My Thrill"	Sidney Clare; Jay Gorney	Both Sides Now
6.	"Sometimes I'm Happy"	Irving Caesar; Clifford Grey; Vincent Youmans	Both Sides Now
7.	"Stay in Touch"		Taming the Tiger
8.	"The Crazy Cries of Love"		Taming the Tiger
9.	"Face Lift"		Taming the Tiger
10.	"Sweet Sucker Dance" (early alternate version)	Mitchell; Charles Mingus	Joni Mitchell Archives – Vol. 4: The Asylum Years (1976–1980), 2024
11.	"You Dream Flat Tires"		Travelogue, 2002
12.	"Answer Me, My Love"	Fred Rauch; Gerhard Winkler; Carl Sigman	Both Sides Now
13.	"Love Puts on a New Face"		Taming the Tiger
14.	"Both Sides Now"		Both Sides Now

Disc three
No.	Title	Writer(s)	Original release	Length
1.	"Harry's House/Centerpiece"	Mitchell; Jon Hendricks; Harry Edison	The Hissing of Summer Lawns
2.	"Sunny Sunday"		Turbulent Indigo
3.	"Hana"		Shine
4.	"Last Chance Lost"		Turbulent Indigo
5.	"Smokin' (Empty, Try Another)"		Dog Eat Dog, 1985
6.	"Hejira" (live at the Santa Barbara County Bowl, September 9, 1979)		Shadows and Light, 1980
7.	"Refuge of the Roads"		Hejira, 1976
8.	"Paprika Plains"		Don Juan's Reckless Daughter, 1977
9.	"Blue Motel Room"		Hejira
10.	"Black Crow"		Hejira
11.	"Off Night Backstreet"		Don Juan's Reckless Daughter
12.	"Just Like This Train"		Court and Spark, 1974
13.	"No Apologies"		Taming the Tiger
14.	"Not to Blame"		Turbulent Indigo
15.	"The Magdalene Laundries"		Turbulent Indigo

Disc four
No.	Title	Writer(s)	Original release	Length
1.	"The Sire of Sorrow (Job's Sad Song)"		Turbulent Indigo
2.	"God Must Be a Boogie Man"		Mingus
3.	"A Chair in the Sky"	Mitchell; Mingus	Mingus
4.	"Goodbye Pork Pie Hat" (live at the Santa Barbara County Bowl, September 9, 1979)	Mitchell; Mingus	Shadows and Light
5.	"The Tea Leaf Prophecy (Lay Down Your Arms)" (with Herbie Hancock)	Mitchell; Klein	River: The Joni Letters by Herbie Hancock, 2007
6.	"Shine"		Shine
7.	"If I Had a Heart"		Shine
8.	"Impossible Dreamer"		Dog Eat Dog
9.	"One Week Last Summer"		Shine
10.	"Summertime" (live at Newport Folk Festival, July 24, 2022)	G. Gershwin; I. Gershwin; DuBose Heyward	Joni Mitchell at Newport, 2023
11.	"Stormy Weather"	Harold Arlen; Ted Koehler	Both Sides Now
12.	"Two Grey Rooms" (demo)		Wild Things Run Fast reissue, 2003
13.	"The Dry Cleaner from Des Moines"	Mitchell; Mingus	Mingus
14.	"Twisted"	Annie Ross; Wardell Gray	Court and Spark
15.	"If"	Mitchell, lyrics adapted from "If—" by Rudyard Kipling	Shine

== Charts ==
=== Weekly charts ===
Weekly chart performance for Joni's Jazz
Chart (2025)	Peak position
Croatian International Albums (HDU)	16
Japanese Top Albums Sales (Billboard Japan)	96
Scottish Albums (Official Charts)	93
UK Albums Sales (OCC)	63
UK Jazz & Blues Albums (Official Charts)	2
US Top Current Album Sales (Billboard)	44
US Top Jazz Albums (Billboard)	9

=== Monthly charts ===
Monthly chart performance for Joni's Jazz
Chart (2025)	Peak position
German Jazz Albums (Offizielle Top 100)	6
