= The Beginning of Survival =

Compilation album by Joni Mitchell
- Released: July 27, 2004
- Recorded: 1985–1998
- Genre: Pop, folk
- Label: Geffen
- Producer: Larry Klein, Joni Mitchell, Mike Ragogna

Joni Mitchell chronology
Travelogue (2002)	The Beginning of Survival (2004)	Dreamland (2004)

Professional ratings
Review scores
Source	Rating
AllMusic	4/5 stars
Encyclopedia of Popular Music	3/5 stars
Rolling Stone	3/5 stars

The Beginning of Survival is the first in a series of compilation albums by Canadian singer-songwriter Joni Mitchell, released by Geffen Records in 2004. The songs were taken from her albums Dog Eat Dog (6 tracks), Chalk Mark in a Rainstorm (4), Night Ride Home (3), Turbulent Indigo (2), and Taming the Tiger (1).

== Track listing ==
All songs by Joni Mitchell unless otherwise noted

1. "The Reoccurring Dream" – 3:03
2. "The Windfall (Everything for Nothing)" – 5:09
3. "Slouching Towards Bethlehem" – 6:49
4. "Dog Eat Dog" – 4:27
5. "Fiction" (Mitchell, Larry Klein) – 4:10
6. "The Beat of Black Wings" – 5:22
7. "No Apologies" – 4:17
8. "Sex Kills" – 3:56
9. "The Three Great Stimulants" – 6:06
10. "Lakota" (Mitchell, Klein) – 6:25
11. "Ethiopia" – 5:38
12. "Cool Water" (Bob Nolan) – 5:25
13. "Tax Free" (Mitchell, Klein) – 4:17
14. "The Magdalene Laundries" – 4:01
15. "Passion Play" – 5:19
16. "Impossible Dreamer" – 4:30
