= Misses (Joni Mitchell album) =

Compilation album by Joni Mitchell
- Released: October 29, 1996
- Recorded: 1969–1994
- Genre: Folk, folk jazz, electronica
- Length: 67:00
- Label: Reprise
- Producer: Joni Mitchell, Larry Klein, Mike Shipley

Joni Mitchell chronology
Hits (1996)	Misses (1996)	Taming the Tiger (1998)

Professional ratings
Review scores
Source	Rating
AllMusic	3/5 stars
Encyclopedia of Popular Music	3/5 stars

Misses is a 1996 compilation album by Canadian singer-songwriter Joni Mitchell. The selections, chosen by Mitchell herself, concentrate on her lesser known, more experimental work, including jazz influenced recordings from the late 1970s and electronic music from the 1980s. Mitchell also designed the album cover, which features her bending down in front of the camera. The album is a companion to Hits, issued on the same day. Mitchell agreed to a request from her record company to release a greatest hits album on the condition that she also be allowed to release Misses. There was also a plan to release a Misses 2, but the label rejected it when suggested by Mitchell.

Cyndi Lauper nominated Misses as one of her all-time favourite albums, singling out "A Case of You". The best known song on Misses, "A Case of You" has been covered by Tori Amos, k.d. lang and Prince, among others.

== Background ==
Reprise Records had approached Mitchell in plans to release a compilation album of her material, but she initially rejected the idea as she believed the compilation would damage her sales of future releases. In 1996, she however agreed to this plan if she was able to release Hits alongside an album of lesser-known songs, which became Misses.

Julie Larson, Reprise director of A&R, concurs. "Initially, Geffen and Elektra were a little hesitant, but they came to an agreement . . . It was challenging getting the deals finalized and locating the masters. This was time consuming." Liner notes for the two compilations were being developed, but were shelved because Mitchell found there was "too much pain involved" whilst writing them.

A sequel album to Misses was conceptualized by Mitchell but it was rejected by the label for unknown reasons.

== Track listing ==
All songs were written by Joni Mitchell, except where indicated.

1. "Passion Play (When All the Slaves Are Free)" – 5:25
  - From Night Ride Home, released in 1991
2. "Nothing Can Be Done" – 4:53
  - From Night Ride Home; music by Larry Klein
3. "A Case of You" – 4:20
  - From Blue, 1971
4. "The Beat of Black Wings" – 5:19
  - From Chalk Mark in a Rain Storm, 1988
5. "Dog Eat Dog" – 4:41
  - From Dog Eat Dog, 1985
  - Features background vocals from James Taylor
6. "The Wolf That Lives in Lindsey" – 6:35
  - From Mingus, 1979
7. "The Magdalene Laundries" – 4:02
  - From Turbulent Indigo, 1994
8. "Impossible Dreamer" – 4:30
  - From Dog Eat Dog
9. "Sex Kills" – 3:56
  - From Turbulent Indigo
10. "The Reoccurring Dream" – 3:02
  - From Chalk Mark in a Rain Storm; co-written by Larry Klein
11. "Harry's House/Centerpiece" – 6:48
  - From The Hissing of Summer Lawns, 1975
  - "Centerpiece" was originally written by Harry Edison and Jon Hendricks in 1958. The liner notes credit Johnny Mandel and Hendricks.
12. "The Arrangement" – 3:32
  - From Ladies of the Canyon, 1970
13. "For the Roses" – 3:48
  - From For the Roses, 1972
14. "Hejira" – 6:42
  - From Hejira, 1976
