= Joni Mitchell blackface controversy =

Joni Mitchell in blackface while performing "Furry Sings the Blues" during her 1980 concert film Shadows and Light.

Canadian-American singer-songwriter Joni Mitchell has used blackface throughout her lifetime. She developed a black male alter ego named "Art Nouveau" at parties in the mid-1970s before appearing as him on the cover of her 1977 album Don Juan's Reckless Daughter. Mitchell continued to use blackface in music videos, films and photo shoots throughout the 1980s. This element of her life has been the subject of much controversy and has drawn a range of responses from Black commentators.

== Background ==
As early as 1974, Mitchell described an apparently imaginary "male muse named Art" in an interview with Time Magazine, who noted that she "deeply (believed)" in him. Mitchell was quoted as saying: "I feel like I'm married to this guy named Art. I'm responsible to my Art above all else." At this stage, she did not refer to Art as being any particular race or having a physical form.

In 1975, Mitchell was first inspired to experiment with blackface during the Rolling Thunder Revue tour, which was in support of Hurricane Carter. Mitchell was asked to introduce Muhammad Ali at Madison Square Garden by Joan Baez. She later recalled the following:

I had talked to Hurricane on the phone several times and I was alone in perceiving that he was a violent person and an opportunist. I thought, "Oh my God, we're a bunch of white patsy liberals. This is a bad person. He's fakin' it." So when we got to the last show, which was at Madison Square Garden, Joan Baez asked me to introduce Muhammad Ali. I was in a particularly cynical mood — it had been a difficult excursion. I said, "Fine, what I'll say is" — and I never would've — I'll say, "We're here tonight on behalf of one jive-ass nigger who could have been champion of the world and I'd like to introduce you to another one who is." She stared at me, and immediately removed me from this introductory role. I thought then, "I should go on in blackface tonight." Anyway, Hurricane was released and the next day he brutally beat up this woman...

Mitchell also claimed her dentist told her she had "teeth like a Negro male." After seeing a black man in the street, she then went to a 1976 Halloween party in blackface as a character she named first "Claude", then "Art Nouveau":

I was walking down Hollywood Boulevard, in search of a costume for a Halloween party when I saw this black guy with a beautiful spirit walking with a bop... As he went by me he turned around and said, "Ummmm, mmm... looking good sister, lookin' good!" Well I just felt so good after he said that. It was as if this spirit went into me. So I started walking like him. I bought a black wig, I bought sideburns, a moustache. I bought some pancake makeup. It was like 'I'm goin' as him!'

Mitchell later claimed she had successfully passed as a man on that night, and had even been asked if she was at the right party.

== Don Juan's Reckless Daughter ==
Original album cover for Don Juan's Reckless Daughter (1977). This album cover was used until 2024, when it was replaced by a new album cover featuring different artwork.

Mitchell's 1977 album cover for Don Juan's Reckless Daughter featured her as Art Nouveau in blackface with a pimp outfit and afro wig. Other visual elements included Mitchell in a black dress with top hat and a photo of Mitchell as a child in Native American garb with Mickey Mouse balloons. In the inner sleeve, she appears in blackface again with a speech bubble reading "Mooslems, Mooooslems! Heh, Heh, Heh." This reference to Muslims echoes the line "While Muslims stick up Washington" in the song "Otis and Marlena", which itself refers to the 1977 Washington, D.C., attack and hostage taking that involved the Black Muslim Hanafi Movement.

The photos were taken by Norman Seeff. Outtakes from the shoot were published in 2018 in the hardcover coffee table book Joni: The Joni Mitchell Sessions. Seeff said that her decision "caused a lot of consternation." "It was great revenge", said Mitchell. "That was all to get (Seeff's) ass. To freak him out." She later claimed she was not recognised by several people on the shoot, who came up to her and asked "Can I help you?"

== 1980s use of blackface in subsequent projects ==
The 1980 concert film Shadows and Light cuts to footage of Mitchell in blackface during the last verse of "Furry Sings the Blues", a song about her meeting with Furry Lewis.

The 1982 film Love consisted of six short vignettes written and directed by women, including "The Cat in the Black Mouse Socks", a story in which Mitchell wears blackface to a party.

In 1988, Mitchell released the song "The Beat of Black Wings" on her album Chalk Mark in a Rain Storm. The song tells the story of "Killer Kyle", a traumatised soldier she once met in a bar who had just returned from the Vietnam War. In the song's music video, Joni played the soldier herself and once again wore blackface.

== Criticism and commentary ==
Mitchell's use of blackface has been criticised as racist.

Charles Mingus reportedly became "curious" about Mitchell after seeing the cover, leading to their collaboration on her subsequent 1979 album Mingus. Chaka Khan, who sang backing vocals on Don Juan's Reckless Daughter, would later say that she "loved" the album cover: "(Mitchell's) into color. She’s a world of person, and she lived that, she sang that, she is that. I am, too. It’s a beautiful thing. It’s a way to go."

Eric Lott stated that Mitchell "thought she inhabited blackness... That's why she didn't see a problem with her wearing blackface or using the N-word."

In 2004, Greg Tate gave a speech titled "How Black is Joni Mitchell?" at a symposium dedicated to Mitchell's work. Amongst many references to her esteemed status in Black culture, he referred to her blackface persona as "brujo" - Spanish for "wizard" - "not minstrel show."

Scholar Miles Parks Grier criticised Mitchell biographers for their inadequate handling of the topic, writing that:

Mitchell in blackface drag acquires a reputation for artistic daring and psychological complexity by impersonating a black pimp figure who accrues neither.... If race and gender cannot be discussed apart, neither can they be rendered equivalent or parallel. Gender may not always be the fundamental problem or prison. Indeed, the experience of gender confinement as an isolated force may be a mixed blessing of membership in a superior racial caste.

In poet and essayist Gustav Parker Hibbett's collection High Jump As Icarus Story, two poems explore the topic, 'Joni Mitchell dresses up as me (I)' and 'Joni Mitchell dresses up as me (II)'.

In 2026, African-American singer-songwriter Sofia D'Angelo dressed up as Art Nouveau for Halloween. Posts of her in costume were widely shared and discussed on Instagram.

== Response from Mitchell ==
Mitchell has consistently defended her use of blackface. For many years, she insisted that the opening line of her autobiography would one day be "I was the only black man at the party."

In 1988, she referred to "(her) blackness" in an interview with Mojo.

In 1994, she told the LA Weekly "I write like a black poet. I frequently write from a black perspective."

In 2015, she told The Cut that she tended to "nod like a brother" when she saw black men in the street, adding "I really feel an affinity because I have experienced being a black guy on several occasions."

In 2017, when interviewed by biographer David Yaffe, Mitchell again defended her use of blackface and also that of Al Jolson, calling him "a Jew in blackface (who's) always getting the better end of the deal... I got away with it … I got the greatest reviews for that record in black magazines. They saw the brother, they reviewed it, and they got it." Yaffe added that it was unclear which "black magazines" Mitchell was referring to.

== 2024 revised artwork for Don Juan's Reckless Daughter ==
On 29 April 2024, Don Juan's Reckless Daughter was given a new album cover on music streaming services. The new cover features a photo of Mitchell's face inside the open mouth of a wolf, an outtake from the 1985 photo sessions for the later album Dog Eat Dog. A subsequent box set, The Asylum Albums, and standalone physical reissue also use the new cover. No announcement was made about the change nor any official reason given, and Mitchell has not commented on the matter.
