= Crash (soundtrack) =

Film soundtrack

Crash: Original Motion Picture Soundtrack is the soundtrack to the 2004 film of the same name. It was released by Superb Records on June 7, 2005, in a double-disc edition The album features 13 tracks from the original score composed by Mark Isham and two tracks—Kathleen York's "In the Deep" and Stereophonics' "Maybe Tomorrow", which appear in the film. The complete score was released on iTunes which had been arranged in the order of its appearance in the film, compared to the commercial CD release, which was edited, incomplete and in suite form. Crash: Music from and Inspired by the Film is the soundtrack containing the songs as heard in the film, (Note: Note: The country song playing during the carjacking scene is "Whiskey Town" by Moot Davis. The song playing on the car radio when Ludacris's character starts ranting about hip hop music being regressive is "Str8UpNDown" by Move.meant. The song playing on the car radio when the hitchhiker is picked up is "Swinging Doors" by Merle Haggard.) released on the second volume of the same disc as the score.

== Crash: Original Motion Picture Soundtrack ==
Crash: Original Motion Picture Soundtrack

Soundtrack album by Mark Isham
- Released: June 7, 2005
- Genre: Instrumental, classical
- Length: 58:34
- Label: Superb Records

=== Background ===
Isham was a friend of Paul Haggis who was eventually hired to score the film, before the production began. Haggis insisted him on the moments where the score was prominent—the fire at the car wreck, and the locksmith's daughter, with the gun—which were the brave moments, where the director has to believe in music. Isham said that in independent filmmaking, the most successful thing is finding fresh approach where due to minimal budget, he has to come up with "a clever idea to get a certain emotional impact, without all of the access to the tried-and-true" and create much as any film that costs a billion times more, comparing his film to that of Star Wars which had a huge budget.

Paul used the film with temp scores, one from The Prayer Cycle (1999) by Jonathan Elias, which was decent from "ambient sounds". He wanted to use a female voice in the score as Isham liked it and thought it would resemble to Hans Zimmer's score for Gladiator (2000). Haggis had previously licensed five songs from Loreena McKennitt's library and went back and forth between her songs, where he could write around and completely design it that way. But it did not suit his plan. Later, he wrote four and five pieces of music which hit the emotional tones and two and three being a vocal track. He hired Carol Ensley to perform Welsh language and Catherine Grant in Latin and Persian, as she was a former ethnomusicologist and professional singer, she could sing various languages so that it sounded different.

=== Reception ===
Music critic Jonathan Broxton commented "Crash will not appeal to a large audience as its sluggish pace and ambient approach provides few, if any, memorable moments. For this willing to take the plunge and dive into Isham’s ocean of synth pads, an almost Zen-like experience lies ahead." He concluded the review, calling it as "an expertly crafted and beautiful score that works both as a dramatic film score and as a meditative experience". Reviewing it as a "sculpted and personal affair", critic Thom Jurek writing for AllMusic commented:

"Inside the context of the film the score helps to shift and move scenes, underscores the subtleties in characters, hovers about dialogue, and adds to both the human and dramatic tension in the complex narrative. As a piece of music, it's moody, often somber; it meanders, floats, stirs, and quietly and thoughtfully suggests rather than insists."

Christian Clemmensen of Filmtracks.com reviewed it as "a morbid listening experience for all but the most somber, melodramatic of types". James Southall of Movie Wave called it as an "exceptionally moving score" that features the "attractive synth score" referencing Angelo Badalamenti's work for The Straight Story (1999) and concluded it as the "strongest score of the year to date". Thomas Glorieux of Maintitles called the score as "moody" and "atmosphere". James Barry of Soundtrack.Net complimented it as "challenging, surprising, moving, and ultimately cathartic and uplifting."

=== Track listing ===
CD version
No.	Title	Writer(s)	Artist(s)	Length
1.	"Crash"			3:21
2.	"Go Forth My Son"			0:57
3.	"Hands in Plain Sight"			3:48
4.	"...Safe Now"			1:03
5.	"No Such Things as Monsters"			3:59
6.	"Find My Baby"			4:23
7.	"Negligence"			2:56
8.	"Flames"			7:59
9.	"Siren"			4:41
10.	"A Really Good Cloak"			3:28
11.	"A Harsh Warning"			2:51
12.	"Saint Christopher"			1:55
13.	"Sense of Touch"			6:44
14.	"In the Deep"	Kathleen York and Michael Becker	Kathleen York	5:55
15.	"Maybe Tomorrow"	Kelly Jones	Stereophonics	4:34

iTunes version (complete score)
No.	Title	Length
1.	"Main Title"	5:14
2.	"'We've Got Guns'"	1:00
3.	"Black Navigator / The Grope"	5:05
4.	"A Warning"	1:18
5.	"Magic Cloak"	4:00
6.	"Back to the Toilet"	1:34
7.	"'Your Father Sounds Like a Good Man'"	4:22
8.	"Negligencia"	1:39
9.	"Cameron – Receipt"	2:23
10.	"The Rescue"	5:57
11.	"News Conference"	2:35
12.	"Car Jack II"	1:46
13.	"'I Didn't Ask for Your Help'"	2:51
14.	"'You Embarrass Me'"	1:24
15.	"The Shooting"	3:29
16.	"Jean's Fall"	1:55
17.	"Illegals / Morgue"	6:43

== Crash: Music from and Inspired by the Film ==
Crash: Music from and Inspired by the Film

Soundtrack album by Various
- Released: June 7, 2005
- Genre: Alternative, pop, rock
- Length: 50:13
- Label: Superb Records

=== Reception ===
Jurek also reviewed the accompanying soundtrack in his website, calling "a bit heavy handed in places and the music can be uneven, but it's nonetheless pleasant and a seamless listen".

=== Track listing ===
No.	Title	Artist	Length
1.	"If I..."	KansasCali	4:18
2.	"Plastic Jesus"	Billy Idol	4:49
3.	"Are You Beautiful"	Chris Pierce	2:52
4.	"Free"	Civilization	3:43
5.	"Hey God"	Randy Coleman	4:04
6.	"Take the Pain Away"	Al Berry	4:19
7.	"Problems"	Move.meant	3:49
8.	"Arrival"	Pale 3/Beth Hirsch	5:08
9.	"Acedia (The Noonday Demon)"	Quinn	3:00
10.	"In the Deep"	Bird York	3:48
11.	"Afraid"	Quincy	5:08
12.	"Maybe Tomorrow"	Stereophonics	4:37
