= Hits and Misses =

Hits and Misses may refer to:

== Literature ==
- Hits and Misses (The Hardy Boys), a 1993 Nancy Drew and Hardy Boys Supermystery crossover novel
- Hits and Misses, a 2018 short story collection by Simon Rich

== Music ==
- Greatest Hits... and Misses a 1989 compilation album by American actor, singer and songwriter Paul Jabara
- Hits (Joni Mitchell album) and Misses (Joni Mitchell album), companion albums released by Joni Mitchell in 1996

== Other uses ==
- "Hits and Misses", a song by Stiff Little Fingers from Go for It
- "Hits and Misses", a season 2 episode of Romeo!

== See also ==
- Hit and miss (disambiguation)
