= Flip Scipio =

American guitar maker and repairman

Flip van Domburg Scipio, known as, Flip Scipio, is an American luthier, owner-operator of Scipio Guitars.

== Career ==
Scipio is a guitar maker and repairman, based in New York and Massachusetts.

=== Early life and education ===
Born in 1959, Scipio grew up outside of Amsterdam in the town of Heiloo. Scipio received his first guitar as a young teen as a gift from his parents.

In 1979, Scipio left his birth country, Holland, with the goal of studying with Paulino Bernabe in Madrid, Spain. Scipio took a job with person who promised him a job working for Bernabe. The promise turned out to be a scam. Scipio was able to briefly meet and speak with Bernabe, but not study with him.

In 1980, Scipio took a basic guitar making course from Božo Podunavac. After taking this class, Scipio, returned to Holland and opened up a small guitar building and repair shop. After operating his small shop in Holland, Scipio left to England to study at the London College of Furniture, enrolling in their fretted instrument technology program. Spending three years at the London College of Furniture, Scipio learned to build classical, flamenco, and electric guitars. While studying in London, Scipio worked for an antique hand-tool dealer. Scipio continues to use some of the antique hand-tools he acquired while working for the dealer.

In 2012, Scipio made a guitar while attending the last summer seminar given by José Luis Romanillos, the famed Spanish luthier.

=== Guitar building ===
In 1986, Scipio was able to move to the United States after he was offered a job running the repair department at Guild Guitar Company in Westerly, Rhode Island. When the Guild Guitar Company factory in Westerly closed, Scipio moved to New York. From 1991 to 1997, Scipio ran the repair department for the Mandolin Brothers on Staten Island. In 1997, Scipio started Scipio Guitars on Staten Island, a repair shop and guitar-build shop. The shop was located at 629 Forest Ave, Staten Island, NY 10310. During his time working on Staten Island, Scipio painted guitars for the FDNY.

In 2007, a 72 minute Dutch-English documentary featuring Scipio tilted "Talking Guitars" was released.

In 2018, the Dedee Shattuck Gallery in Westport, Massachusetts, held an exhibit featuring Scipio's guitar work. The exhibit, "Flip Scipio: Talking Guitars," featured drawings and guitars made by Scipio.

Scipio is a 15+ year member of the Guild of American Luthiers.

As of 2021, Scipio's brace wood of choice is sitka spruce.

==== Clientele ====
Scipio's clientele include: Paul McCartney, Jackson Browne, Ry Cooder, Paul Simon, and Rosanne Cash.

== Personal life ==
Scipio is married to bookbinder Mary Elizabeth Pratt.
