= Wicked Little High =

Studio album by Bird York
- Released: February 21, 2006
- Label: EMI

Wicked Little High (2006 EMI Records) is the third studio album by artist, actor and screenwriter Bird York.

== Background ==
Wicked Little High is a re-recording of Bird York's previous album, The Velvet Hour. York said her voice changed in the interim, and aimed to sing on Wicked Little High with what she called "the kind of voice that comes out of the speakers and wraps around the room a bit."

Single "In the Deep" was written for the 2004 film Crash; York later said the full album "fits everything that's going on with [the film's] character. The single debuted at #64 on the Billboard chart. "In the Deep" was later nominated for an Academy Award for Best Song, and York performed the song live at the 78th Academy Awards in 2006.

"Have No Fear" was the theme song of the 2008 film Seven Pounds.

== Critical reception ==
The album received generally positive reviews from critics. The Advocate's Peter Galvin praised the album, particularly its "intense" lyrics. Chuck Campbell of Scripps Howard praised the album's atmosphere, comparing it to the work of Dido and Sarah McLachlan. The album was also praised by outlets including Billboard, Newsweek, NPR, Paste Magazine, and The Boston Herald. Richard Cromelin of the Los Angeles Times called the album's trip-hop and electronic elements "familiar and generic."

== Track listing ==
1. Come Be With Me (3:48)
2. Had A Dream (5:12)
3. Haunting You (4:25)
4. Have No Fear (2:25)
5. In The Deep (3:34)
6. Lovely Thing (3:59)
7. Never Gonna Find Us (3:15)
8. Open Wider (4:49)
9. Remedy (4:44)
10. Save Me (4:32)
11. Up In Flames (4:15)
12. Wicked Little High (4:33)

== Personnel ==
All tracks were written by York and:

- Michael Becker (Tracks 1, 3, 4, 5, 7)
- Rik Musallam (Track 2)
- Peter Fox (Track 6)
- Larry Klein (Tracks 9 & 11)
