= Hit and miss =

Hit and miss may refer to:

- Hit & Miss, a 2012 British television series starring Chloë Sevigny
- Hit-and-miss engine, a type of internal combustion engine
- "Hit and Miss", a 1960 song by The John Barry Seven plus Four, used as the theme to the TV series Juke Box Jury

== See also ==
- Hits and Misses (disambiguation)
- Hit or Miss (disambiguation)
