= Bird York (album) =

Studio album by Bird York
- Released: 1999
- Genre: Modern rock
- Length: 43:00
- Label: Blissed Out
- Producer: Bird York, Jamie Muhoberac, Thom Russo, Larry Klein

Bird York chronology
Bird York (1999)	The Velvet Hour (2003)

Bird York is the debut album by Bird York. It includes collaborations with Grammy Award-winning producer Larry Klein, and Grammy Award-winning engineer mixer, Thom Russo and includes songs heard on Nip Tuck and CBS's Family Law. Musicians include Tori Amos guitarist Steve Caton, Shawn Colvin producer/bassist Larry Klein, and Seal's keyboardist-programmer, Jamie Muhoberac.

== Track listing ==
1. "Come Home"
2. "What Are You Running After"
3. "Open Wider"
4. "Bought A Gun"
5. "Save Me"
6. "Prozac Day"
7. "Punish Me With Kisses"
8. "Strange Chemistry"
9. "I'm Not Laughing Anymore"
10. "Breathe Deeply"
