= Don Juan's Reckless Daughter =

Studio album by Joni Mitchell
- Released: December 13, 1977
- Recorded: 1977
- Studios: A&M, Hollywood; Columbia Studio C, New York City; Basing Street, London
- Genres: Folk-jazz; jazz fusion; jazz-rock; experimental jazz
- Length: 59:28
- Label: Asylum
- Producers: Joni Mitchell; Henry Lewy; Steve Katz

Joni Mitchell chronology
Hejira (1976)	Don Juan's Reckless Daughter (1977)	Mingus (1979)

Alternative cover
- Alternative cover used for all physical releases and streaming services after April 29, 2024.

Singles from Don Juan's Reckless Daughter
- 1. "Jericho" Released: February 1978

Don Juan's Reckless Daughter is the ninth studio album by Canadian singer-songwriter Joni Mitchell, released on December 13, 1977, through Asylum Records. A double album, it is unusual for its experimental style, expanding even further on the jazz-influenced sound of Mitchell's previous recordings. Mitchell has stated that, close to completing her contract with Asylum Records, she allowed this album to be looser than anything she had done previously.

Don Juan's Reckless Daughter was released in December 1977 to mixed reviews. It reached No. 25 on the Billboard charts and attained gold record status within three months.

The album is also notable for Mitchell's controversial use of blackface on the cover.

== Background and content ==
Much of the album is experimental: "Overture" is played with six simultaneous guitars, some in different tunings from others, with vocal echo effects; "The Tenth World" is an extended-length instrumental of Latin percussion; "Dreamland" features only percussion and voices (including that of Chaka Khan).

"Paprika Plains" is a 16-minute song played on improvised piano and arranged with a full orchestra; it takes up all of Side 2. In it, Mitchell narrates a first-person description of a late-night gathering in a bar frequented by Indigenous peoples of Canada, touching on themes of hopelessness and alcoholism. At one point in the narrative, the narrator leaves the setting to watch the rain and enters into a dreamstate, and the lyrics – printed in the liner notes but not sung – become a mixture of references to innocent childhood memories, a nuclear explosion and an expressionless tribe gazing upon the dreamer. The narrator returns inside after the rain passes. In speaking to Anthony Fawcett about working on "Paprika Plains", Mitchell said:

The Improvisational, the spontaneous aspect of this creative process – still as a poet – is to set words to the music, which is a hammer and chisel process. Sometimes it flows, but a lot of times it's blocked by concept. And if you're writing free consciousness – which I do once in a while just to remind myself that I can, you know, because I'm fitting little pieces of this puzzle together – the end result must flow as if it was spoken for the first time.

"Off Night Backstreet" was released as a single backed with "Jericho", but did not chart. "The Tenth World" was also released as a single in France.

Two of the album's songs had previously been released: "Jericho" by Mitchell on her 1974 live album Miles of Aisles and "Dreamland" by Roger McGuinn on his 1976 album Cardiff Rose.

Don Juan's Reckless Daughter featured contributions from prominent jazz musicians, including four members of Weather Report – Jaco Pastorius, Wayne Shorter, Manolo Badrena, and Alex Acuña.

== Artwork ==
The original album artwork depicted a photomontage of shots taken by Norman Seeff, later arranged by Mitchell with a camera lucida and set on an orange-and-blue colour backdrop selected by Glen Christensen. Most prominently, Mitchell is featured in blackface with a pimp outfit and afro wig. In the inner sleeve, she appears in blackface again with a speech bubble reading "Mooslems, Mooooslems! Heh, Heh, Heh." This reference to Muslims echoes the line "While Muslims stick up Washington" in the song "Otis and Marlena", which itself refers to the 1977 Washington, D.C., attack and hostage taking that involved the Black Muslim Hanafi Movement.

Mitchell's use of blackface became one of the most controversial moments of her career, widely criticised as racist in subsequent years.

On 29 April 2024, Don Juan's Reckless Daughter was given a new album cover on music streaming services. The new cover features a photo of Mitchell with a dog, an outtake from the 1985 photo sessions for the later album Dog Eat Dog. A subsequent box set, The Asylum Albums, and standalone physical reissue also use the new cover. No announcement was made about the change nor any official reason given, and Mitchell has not commented on the matter.

== Critical reception ==
Professional ratings
Review scores
Source	Rating
AllMusic	2/5 stars
Christgau's Record Guide	B−
DownBeat	4.5/5 stars
The Encyclopedia of Popular Music	2/5 stars
The Great Rock Discography	5/10
MusicHound Rock	3/5 stars
Pitchfork	6.1/10
The Rolling Stone Album Guide	3/5 stars

Rolling Stone opined that "the best that can be said for Don Juan's Reckless Daughter is that it is an instructive failure," writing that "it's sapped of emotion and full of ideas that should have remained whims, melodies that should have been riffs, songs that should have been fragments." The Globe and Mail concluded that "many of the novel sounds that marked her shift to the fully electric, pop-oriented sound have gone bland for lack of detailed attention."

== Track listing ==
All tracks are written by Joni Mitchell, except "The Tenth World" by Mitchell, Don Alias, Manolo Badrena, Alex Acuña, Airto Moreira, and Jaco Pastorius.

Side one
No.	Title	Length
1.	"Overture – Cotton Avenue"	6:35
2.	"Talk to Me"	3:40
3.	"Jericho"	3:25
Total length:		13:40

Side two
No.	Title	Length
1.	"Paprika Plains"	16:19
Total length:		16:19

Side three
No.	Title	Length
1.	"Otis and Marlena"	4:09
2.	"The Tenth World"	6:45
3.	"Dreamland"	4:38
Total length:		15:32

Side four
No.	Title	Length
1.	"Don Juan's Reckless Daughter"	6:36
2.	"Off Night Backstreet"	3:20
3.	"The Silky Veils of Ardor"	4:01
Total length:		13:57

== Personnel ==
Musicians

- Joni Mitchell – vocals, guitars; piano on "Paprika Plains"
- Jaco Pastorius – bass guitar; bongos on "The Tenth World"; cowbells on "Dreamland"
- John Guerin – drums
- Wayne Shorter – soprano saxophone on "Jericho" and "Paprika Plains"
- Alex Acuña – congas, cowbell & backing vocals on "The Tenth World"; shakers on "Dreamland"; ankle bells on "Don Juan's Reckless Daughter"
- Don Alias – bongos on "Jericho"; congas, claves & backing vocals on "The Tenth World"; snare drum & sandpaper blocks on "Dreamland"; shakers on "Don Juan's Reckless Daughter"
- Manolo Badrena – congas, coffee cans & lead vocal on "The Tenth World"; congas on "Dreamland"; credited "in spirit" on "Don Juan's Reckless Daughter"
- Airto Moreira – surdo on "The Tenth World" and "Dreamland"
- Larry Carlton – electric guitar on "Otis And Marlena"
- Michel Colombier – piano on "Otis And Marlena"
- Chaka Khan – backing vocals on "The Tenth World" and "Dreamland"
- Glenn Frey, JD Souther – backing vocals on "Off Night Backstreet"
- Michael Gibbs – orchestral arrangements and conductor on "Paprika Plains" and "Off Night Backstreet"
- Bobbye Hall – credited "in spirit" on "Don Juan's Reckless Daughter"
- El Bwyd – "the split-tongued spirit" vocals on "Don Juan's Reckless Daughter"

Production

- Henry Lewy, Steve Katz – production, mixing
- Robert Ash – assistant engineer
- Frank Laico – orchestra recording
- Glen Christensen – art direction
- Les Krims – artwork on Ms. Mitchell's dress
- Norman Seeff – photography
- Keith Williamson – photoprints

== Charts ==
Chart performance for Don Juan's Reckless Daughter
Chart (1977–1978)	Peak position
Australian Albums (Kent Music Report)	39
Canada Top Albums/CDs (RPM)	28
UK Albums (Official Charts)	20
US Billboard 200	25
US Cash Box Top 100 Albums	23

Chart (2024)	Peak position
Hungarian Physical Albums (MAHASZ)	24
