= My Secret Place =

Single by Joni Mitchell

from the album Chalk Mark in a Rain Storm
- B-side: "Number One" (Europe and Australia) / "Lakota" (North America)
- Released: May 23, 1988
- Recorded: 1986
- Studio: Ashcombe House, Somerset
- Length: 5:01
- Label: Geffen
- Songwriter: Joni Mitchell
- Producer: Joni Mitchell

Joni Mitchell singles chronology
"Shiny Toys" (1986)	"My Secret Place" (1988)	"Cool Water" (1988)

"My Secret Place" is a song written by Joni Mitchell that first appeared on her 1988 album Chalk Mark in a Rain Storm. Recorded as a duet with Peter Gabriel, the song was released as the first single from the album and reached number 41 on the Canadian singles chart, becoming her first song to reach the Canadian Top 100 since "Coyote" eleven years prior.

== Recording ==
"My Secret Place" and "Number One" were the first two songs Mitchell wrote for Chalk Mark in A Rainstorm. When Mitchell was working on new material in Britain, Robert Plant visited the house she was staying at with the intention of finding potential songs to record. During his stay, Mitchell sang him stripped–down renditions of "My Secret Place" and "Number One" with an acoustic guitar. Plant was impressed with both songs, but was particularly interested in recording "Number One". Mitchell ultimately opted not to collaborate with Plant and instead elected to record "My Secret Place" with Peter Gabriel.

Mitchell's husband, Larry Klein, had played on Gabriel's So album in 1986, which prompted Gabriel to invite Mitchell and Klein to his Ashcombe House studio, where the duet between Gabriel and Mitchell on "My Secret Place" was recorded. Mitchell recalled that she originally intended for Gabriel to record background vocals on "My Secret Place", but later decided to give him a more prominent role on the song after experimenting with some vocal ideas.

When we started messing around with the vocals, it came to me that rather than doing a traditional duet, it would be interesting to let our voices keep dissolving into each other, where the gender keeps changing. Instead of singing at each other, it's like people thinking the same thing – a kind of one-mindedness.

— Joni Mitchell

Manu Katché, who drums and percussion on "My Secret Place", said in a 1987 interview with Modern Drummer that he became involved with the recording sessions for "My Secret Place" around the time of the Amnesty International tour. Mitchell had been looking for a drummer for her Chalk Mark in a Rainstorm album and selected him after listening to his playing on Gabriel's So album.

On "My Secret Place", Mitchell expended an entire reel of tape by layering the same guitar part 24 times. She thought that these guitar overdubs would render her guitar more prominent in the mix and "beef up" certain sections, thus making the chord changes more noticeable. Mitchell executed these guitar parts on a Martin D-28 acoustic guitar and utilized a guitar tuning of C# G# D# F# G# C#.

== Lyrics and release ==
Lyrically, the song details a story about moving from New York City to the Colorado mountains with a loved one. Mitchell described "My Secret Place" as the only love song on Chalk Mark in a Rain Storm and said that she wanted it to resemble "Song of Solomon, where you can't tell what gender it is." She said that the song was about "the threshold of intimacy" and "the uniting spirit of two people at the beginning of a relationship."

On May 23, 1988, "My Secret Place" was issued as a single in the UK by Geffen Records with the song "Number One" included as the B-side. That same month, the song was serviced to adult contemporary radio stations in the United States; according to Radio & Records, it was among the most added songs in that format during the week of May 27, 1988.

== Music video ==
In the May 7, 1988 edition of Billboard, Steve Gett wrote that Mitchell was slated to meet with Peter Gabriel in Britain to film a music video for "My Secret Place". Later that month, "My Secret Place" was launched on VH1. Anton Corbijn directed the song's music video, which was shot in black-and-white and includes scenes of Gabriel and Mitchell walking across a desert and chatting at a dinner table.

== Critical reception ==
"My Secret Place" generally received positive reviews from music critics. Ken Tucker of The Village Voice thought that the song's lyrics evoked the "confessional mode that made Mitchell the most admired '70's singer-songwriter" and deemed the song as a strong album opener. Greg Quill of the Toronto Star was more critical, saying that "My Secret Place" was "arguably the least appealing song on the album", although he praised Gabriel's "strong counterpoint" vocals.

Billboard labeled "My Secret Place" as one of the best candidates for radio acceptance" from Chalk Mark in a Rainstorm. Writing for Music Week, Jerry Smith praised "My Secret Place" as a "superb track" with a mesmerising, atmospheric rhythm and a soaring chorus featuring Peter Gabriel that could prove surprisingly successful."

Uncut commended the drumming of Manu Katché and also praised the song's vocals, saying that "Gabriel and Mitchell's voices tie together to the point of being inseparable. They finish each other's sentences and sing in unison, an aural equivalent of a couple who've accidentally started to dress the same." J.D. Considine of Rolling Stone thought that the song showcased "the similarities between her [Mitchell's] voice and Peter Gabriel's", saying that they "illustrate[d] the shifting confidences of shared intimacy". He highlighted moments in the song where the two swapped lines within a stanza, which he thought was an effective means of demonstrating the fluctuations in balance within a relationship. The publication also listed "My Secret Place" as one of Mitchell's 50 greatest songs.

== Track listing ==
- UK 7" single (Geffen GEF 37)
1. "My Secret Place" (edit) – 3:17
2. "Number One" – 3:46
- US 7" single (Geffen 7-27887)
1. "My Secret Place" (edit) – 3:17
2. "Lakota" – 6:25

== Personnel ==
- Joni Mitchell – lead and backing vocals, guitars, keyboards
- Peter Gabriel – lead and backing vocals
- Larry Klein – bass guitar, keyboards
- Manu Katché – drums, talking drum

== Chart performance ==
Chart (1988)	Peak position
Canada Top Singles (RPM)	41
