= Don Freed =

Canadian singer-songwriter

- Born: Donald Freed; 1949 (age 76–77); New Westminster, British Columbia, Canada
- Genres: Folk
- Occupation: Singer-songwriter
- Instruments: Guitar, vocal, harmonica
- Years active: 1966-present

Donald Freed (born 1949 in New Westminster) is a Canadian singer-songwriter best known for his works about life on the prairies of western-Canada and the province of Saskatchewan in particular.

== Life and career ==
Don Freed was born of Métis descent in New Westminster, British Columbia, and raised in Saskatoon.

Beginning his musical career in 1966, he appeared with Johnny Cash in the 1969 documentary Johnny Cash! The Man, His World, His Music. In the film, Freed is shown visiting Cash backstage where he performs two songs, after which Cash promised to get the singer an audition with Columbia Records. He was subsequently signed by Capitol and recorded an album for them in 1972, which was never released.

In 1975 Freed toured in western Canada as the opening act for Lightnin' Hopkins.

Freed went on to record a number of albums in the early 1980s which were regionally popular in western Canada including Off in All Directions and Pith and Pathos. Many of Freed's songs about prairie life have been incorporated into high school curricula throughout Saskatchewan.

Among performers who have collaborated with Freed on his recordings have been Colin James (who made some of his earliest recordings with Freed), Jane Siberry and actress Linda Griffiths. He also collaborated with Joni Mitchell on her album Taming the Tiger, co-writing the song "Crazy Cries of Love". Mitchell and Freed were romantically linked in the mid-1990s.

Beginning in the early 1990s, Freed began to shift his musical focus from that of being a solo performer to being a promoter of Métis and First Nations culture, particularly involving children. His work in teaching songwriting to children in northern Saskatchewan was covered nationally by CBC Newsworld and even earned an article in the American Billboard magazine. Several albums have been released of Freed's collaborations with children, as well as an album of songs called Mystery Boyz created in collaboration with young offenders incarcerated at the North Battleford Youth Centre in North Battleford, Saskatchewan.

In 1999, Freed co-wrote Sasquatch Exterminator, a book (with accompanying CD) aimed at teaching Aboriginal language to children. It was produced in conjunction with the Gabriel Dumont Institute.

In recent years, Freed has brought his songwriting workshops to the Edmonton Folk Music Festival and to venues throughout the Northwest Territories and Yukon. Freed's most recent CD release is 2005's The Valley of Green and Blue, which celebrates his Métis heritage.

== Album discography ==
- 1972 - unreleased album for Capitol Records
- 1981 - Off in All Directions
- 1982 - Pith and Pathos
- 1989 - On the Plains (audio cassette release only)
- 1992 - Live ARR! (audio cassette release only)
- 1993 - Young Northern Voices
- 1996 - Singing About the Métis
- 1998 - Inner City Harmony: A Class Act
- 1999 - Borderlands
- 1999 - Sasquatch Exterminator (CD and book)
- 2000 - Mystery Boyz
- 2001 - Our Very Own Songs (2-CD set, credited to Don Freed and the Kids of Northern Saskatchewan)
- 2005 - The Valley of Green and Blue

Early pressings of Off in All Directions included a comic book entitled Scratchatune Comics, featuring illustrated adaptations of Freed's songs. The title of the comic is taken from Freed's music publishing company, which in turn is a play on the name Saskatoon.

In addition, Freed released a cassette single, "Saskatchewan" in 1988. (The song was originally to have been released on a 45 rpm vinyl single a year earlier, however a production problem resulted in its release being cancelled at the last minute.)
