= Hit or Miss =

Hit or Miss may refer to:

== Music ==
- "Hit or Miss" (New Found Glory song), 1999
- "Mia Khalifa" (song), a 2018 song by iLoveFriday also known as "Hit or Miss"
- "Hit or Miss", a song by The Damned from their 1980 album The Black Album
- "Hit or Miss", a song by Jacob Sartorius from his 2017 EP The Last Text EP
- "Hit or Miss", a 1970 song by Odetta from Odetta Sings

== Other uses ==
- Hit or Miss (card game)
- Hit-or-miss transform, a mathematical operation

== See also ==
- Hit and miss (disambiguation)
