= Shine (Joni Mitchell album) =

Studio album by Joni Mitchell
- Released: September 25, 2007
- Recorded: 2006–2007
- Studio: Castle Oaks (Calabasas, California)
- Genres: Pop; rock
- Length: 46:57
- Labels: Hear Music; Universal
- Producer: Joni Mitchell

Joni Mitchell chronology
| Songs of a Prairie Girl (2005) | Shine (2007) | Amchitka (2009) |

Shine is the nineteenth and final studio album by Canadian singer-songwriter Joni Mitchell, released on September 25, 2007, by Hear Music. It is Mitchell's first album of new material since Taming the Tiger (1998).

In the US, the album sold 40,000 copies in its first week, debuting at No. 14 on the Billboard 200 chart; this was Mitchell's best peak position in America since Hejira (1976). Shine peaked at No. 36 on the UK chart, making it Mitchell's first Top 40 album there since Night Ride Home (1991). In its first week on sale, Shine sold around 60,000 copies worldwide. As of February 2008, the album has sold 372,000 copies in the United States.

== Background ==
In 2002, Joni Mitchell famously left the music business. The public first learned that she had returned to writing and recording in October 2006, when she spoke to The Ottawa Citizen. In an interview with the newspaper, Mitchell "revealed she's recording her first collection of new songs in nearly a decade" but gave few other details.

Four months later, in an interview with The New York Times, Mitchell said that the album was inspired by the war in Iraq and "something her grandson had said while listening to family fighting: 'Bad dreams are good—in the great plan.'"

The Sunday Times wrote in February 2007 that the album has "a minimal feel, a sparseness that harks back to her early work," adding that "rest and some good healers" had restored much of the singer's vocal power. Mitchell herself described Shine as "as serious a work as I've ever done". In March 2007, The Guardian reported that Shine will feature a "new version" of Mitchell's 1970 environmentally-themed hit single.

The album was launched at the Sunshine Theater on Houston Street, New York City, on September 25, 2007, with a film of the Alberta Ballet performing The Fiddle and the Drum, a ballet devised by choreographer Jean Grand-Maître in collaboration with Mitchell that had premiered in Calgary on February 8 that year. The ballet uses a selection of Mitchell's songs, including "If I Had a Heart" and "If" from Shine, along with images from her art installation Flag Dance, which are projected as a backdrop. The album cover features a scene from The Fiddle and the Drum. The CD was distributed with a matching blue band around it, not glued on, which obscured the bodies of the male dancers in tights from the general public.

Shine is only the second Joni Mitchell album never to have been distributed by Warner Music Group, the first being Night Ride Home, which was released by Geffen Records after the company was sold to MCA.

== Music and lyrics ==
In an interview, Mitchell referred to "This Place" as a "second guitar song [inspired when] they decided to whittle down this mountain behind my sanctuary and sell it to California as gravel for McMansions." "If I Had a Heart" is a reaction to the state of the environment and what Mitchell called the current "holy war". In February 2007, The New York Times described the song as "one of the most haunting melodies she has ever written". Of the impetus that inspired her to write the song, Mitchell explained, "My heart is broken in the face of the stupidity of my species. I can't cry about it. In a way I'm inoculated. I've suffered this pain for so long. ...The West has packed the whole world on a runaway train. We are on the road to extincting ourselves as a species." "Hana" is based on the main character in the film White Banners (1937).

"Bad Dreams" was inspired by a comment Mitchell's grandson made at the age of three: "Bad dreams are good, in the great plan." In a March 2007 BBC Radio 2 interview with Amanda Ghost, the singer jokingly said she'd promised to "cut him in" on the song's profits. The lyrics appeared as a poem in The New Yorker on September 17, 2007. "Night of the Iguana" is based upon the play The Night of the Iguana by Tennessee Williams. The Globe and Mail described the title track as "a lush lullaby for the soul." "If" is a jazz-inflected composition based on the 19th-century poem If— by Rudyard Kipling.

== Reception ==
Professional ratings
Review scores
| Source | Rating |
|---|---|
| AllMusic | 4/5 stars |
| The Encyclopedia of Popular Music | 3/5 stars |
| Entertainment Weekly | A− |
| The Guardian | 4/5 stars |
| Los Angeles Times | 3.5/4 stars |
| Mojo | 5/5 stars |
| Pitchfork | 8.0/10 |
| PopMatters | 8/10 |
| Q | 3/5 stars |
| Rolling Stone | 3/5 stars |

Shine has a 77/100 on Metacritic. "One Week Last Summer" won the 2008 Grammy Award for Best Pop Instrumental Performance.

== Track listing ==
All tracks are written by Joni Mitchell. Lyrics for "If" are adapted from "If—" by Rudyard Kipling.

1. "One Week Last Summer" – 4:58
2. "This Place" – 3:54
3. "If I Had a Heart" – 4:03
4. "Hana" – 3:42
5. "Bad Dreams" – 5:40
6. "Big Yellow Taxi (2007)" – 2:46
7. "Night of the Iguana" – 4:36
8. "Strong and Wrong" – 4:02
9. "Shine" – 7:28
10. "If" – 5:32

== Personnel ==
- Joni Mitchell – vocals, guitar, piano, keyboards
- Greg Leisz – pedal steel guitar
- Larry Klein – bass guitar, double bass
- Brian Blade – drums
- Bob Sheppard – alto and soprano saxophone
- Paulinho Da Costa – percussion on "Hana"
- James Taylor – acoustic guitar on "Shine"

== Charts ==
Chart performance for Shine
| Chart (2007) | Peak position |
|---|---|
| Australian Albums (ARIA) | 71 |
| Belgian Albums (Ultratop Flanders) | 19 |
| Dutch Albums (Album Top 100) | 44 |
| French Albums (SNEP) | 103 |
| Irish Albums (IRMA) | 59 |
| Italian Albums (FIMI) | 30 |
| Norwegian Albums (VG-lista) | 10 |
| Swedish Albums (Sverigetopplistan) | 25 |
| Swiss Albums (Schweizer Hitparade) | 100 |
| UK Albums (Official Charts) | 36 |
| US Billboard 200 | 14 |
| US Top Rock Albums (Billboard) | 3 |
| US Indie Store Album Sales (Billboard) | 12 |
| Scottish Albums (Official Charts) | 44 |
