= Dreamland (Joni Mitchell album) =

Compilation album by Joni Mitchell
- Released: September 24, 2004
- Genre: Folk; pop
- Length: 77:15
- Label: Rhino
- Producer: Joni Mitchell

Joni Mitchell chronology
The Beginning of Survival (2004)	Dreamland (2004)	Songs of a Prairie Girl (2005)

Professional ratings
Review scores
Source	Rating
AllMusic	3.5/5 stars
Encyclopedia of Popular Music	4/5 stars

Dreamland is a compilation album by Canadian singer-songwriter Joni Mitchell, released in 2004 by Rhino. The songs for the album were selected by the singer herself. The booklet contains an essay by Cameron Crowe on Mitchell's career and several paintings by Joni Mitchell. As of December 2007, the album has sold 78,000 copies in the US.

== Track listing ==
All tracks composed by Joni Mitchell; except where indicated

1. "Free Man in Paris" – 3:03
2. "In France They Kiss on Main Street" – 3:19
3. "Dreamland" – 4:38
4. "The Jungle Line" – 4:24
5. "Furry Sings the Blues" – 5:06
6. "You Turn Me On, I'm a Radio" – 2:39
7. "Carey" – 3:04
8. "Big Yellow Taxi" – 2:17
9. "California" – 3:51
10. "Help Me" – 3:24
11. "Nothing Can Be Done" – 4:51 (Mitchell, Larry Klein)
12. "Dancin' Clown" – 3:51
13. "Come in from the Cold" – 7:30
14. "Amelia" (2002 orchestral version) – 6:46
15. "For the Roses" (2002 orchestral version) – 7:29
16. "Both Sides Now" (2000 orchestral version) – 5:46
17. "The Circle Game" – 4:51

== Charts ==
Chart performance for Dreamland
Chart (2004)	Peak position
UK Albums (OCC)	43
US Billboard 200	177
Scottish Albums (OCC)	39
Norwegian Albums (VG-lista)	21
