= Songs of a Prairie Girl =

Compilation album by Joni Mitchell
- Released: April 26, 2005
- Genre: Folk rock
- Length: 76:41
- Label: Asylum; Reprise; Nonesuch; Rhino
- Producer: Joni Mitchell

Joni Mitchell chronology
Dreamland (2004)	Songs of a Prairie Girl (2005)	Shine (2007)

Professional ratings
Review scores
Source	Rating
AllMusic	4.5/5 stars
Encyclopedia of Popular Music	4/5 stars

Songs of a Prairie Girl is the third (and last) in Canadian singer-songwriter Joni Mitchell's series of compilations. Mitchell writes in the liner notes to the CD that the compilation is her contribution to Saskatchewan's Centennial Celebration and that the songs of the album reference Saskatchewan. Although Mitchell was born in neighboring Alberta, when she was eleven years old her family settled in Saskatoon, Saskatchewan, which Mitchell considers her hometown.

== Track listing ==
All songs written by Joni Mitchell, except "Unchained Melody" written by Hy Zaret and Alex North.

1. "Urge for Going" – 5:08
2. "The Tea Leaf Prophecy (Lay Down Your Arms)" – 4:54
3. "Cherokee Louise" (orchestral version) – 6:01
4. "Ray's Dad's Cadillac" – 4:33
5. "Let the Wind Carry Me" – 3:56
6. "Don Juan's Reckless Daughter" – 6:38
7. "Raised on Robbery" – 3:07
8. "Paprika Plains" (Remix) – 16:19
9. "Song for Sharon" – 8:37
10. "River" – 4:05
11. "Chinese Café/Unchained Melody" – 5:18
12. "Harlem in Havana" – 4:27
13. "Come In from the Cold" (edit) – 3:38
