= Brandi Shearer =

American singer and songwriter (born 1980)

- Born: June 5, 1980 (age 44); Oregon, United States.
- Genres: Acoustic, Alternative, Rock
- Occupation(s): Musician, songwriter
- Years active: 1998–present
- Labels: Amoeba Records, Vinyl Tiger Music
- Website: www.brandishearer.com

Brandi Shearer (born June 5, 1980) is an American singer-songwriter.

== Early life ==
Brandi Shearer was raised on a farm in rural Oregon where she was encouraged by her grandmother to sing and play music. Shearer traveled to Hungary as part of a student exchange program. In Hungary, she was exposed to blues artists. She subsequently dropped out of college and began performing in clubs and bars in Hungary and France.

== Career ==
In 1998, Shearer moved to San Francisco and released her debut album, which featured jazz guitarist Ted Savarese. She also played rhythm guitar in Savarese's jazz ensemble Drizzoletto. Shearer released the albums Music of a Saturday Night and Sycamore in 2003 and 2004 respectively. Following their release, Amoeba Records owner David Prinz booked Shearer for a live recording with the jazz group the Robin Nolan Trio in 2005. Various tours and performances followed, including an appearance with Robin Nolan at Austin's SXSW festival. In 2005, Shearer released Rendezvous at the Nightery, her debut recording for Amoeba, backed by the Robin Nolan Trio and David Grisman on mandolin, followed by the release of Close to Dark in 2007. After the Amoeba folded in 2008, Shearer formed Vinyl Tiger Music. Shearer released Love Don't Make You Juliet in 2009.

Her music has been used for film and television, including the television series Dexter, Weeds, True Blood, and Prime Suspect.

== Discography ==
Studio albums

- Museum (1999)
- Music of a Saturday Night (2003)
- Sycamore (2004)
- Rendezvous at the Nightery (2005)
- Close to Dark (2007)
- Love Don't Make You Juliet (2009)
