= Hits (Joni Mitchell album) =

Greatest hits album by Joni Mitchell
- Released: October 29, 1996
- Recorded: 1969–1991
- Genre: Folk
- Length: 60:34
- Label: Reprise
- Producer: Joni Mitchell

Joni Mitchell chronology
Turbulent Indigo (1994)	Hits (1996)	Misses (1996)

Professional ratings
Review scores
Source	Rating
AllMusic	4.5/5 stars
Encyclopedia of Popular Music	3/5 stars
Rolling Stone	(mixed)

Hits is a 1996 greatest hits compilation by Canadian singer-songwriter Joni Mitchell. As of December 2007, it has sold 488,000 copies in the United States, and was certified Gold in the United Kingdom in 2013 for 100,000 copies sold. A counterpart album, Misses, was released on the same day as Hits. It consists of Mitchell's lesser known songs that she considers her most overlooked material.

== Track listing ==
All tracks are written by Joni Mitchell, except "Unchained Melody" by Alex North and Hy Zaret.

Hits
No.	Title	Original release	Length
1.	"Urge for Going"	"You Turn Me On, I'm a Radio", 1972	5:05
2.	"Chelsea Morning"	Clouds, 1969	2:31
3.	"Big Yellow Taxi"	Ladies of the Canyon, 1970	2:14
4.	"Woodstock"	Ladies of the Canyon	5:27
5.	"The Circle Game"	Ladies of the Canyon	4:51
6.	"Carey"	Blue, 1971	3:02
7.	"California"	Blue	3:50
8.	"You Turn Me On, I'm a Radio"	For the Roses, 1972	2:39
9.	"Raised on Robbery"	Court and Spark, 1974	3:05
10.	"Help Me"	Court and Spark	3:22
11.	"Free Man in Paris"	Court and Spark	3:02
12.	"River"	Blue	4:04
13.	"Chinese Café/Unchained Melody"	Wild Things Run Fast, 1982	5:18
14.	"Come in from the Cold"	Night Ride Home, 1991	7:30
15.	"Both Sides, Now"	Clouds	4:34
Total length:			60:34

== Charts ==
Chart performance for Hits
Chart (1996)	Peak position
US Billboard 200	161
US Cash Box Top 200 Albums	66

== Certifications ==
Region	Certification	Certified units/sales
Australia (ARIA)	Platinum	70,000^{^}
United Kingdom (BPI)	Gold	100,000^{^}
^{^} Shipments figures based on certification alone.
