= Taming the Tiger =

Studio album by Joni Mitchell
- Released: September 29, 1998
- Genres: Adult alternative; jazz
- Length: 43:17
- Label: Reprise
- Producer: Joni Mitchell

Joni Mitchell chronology
Misses (1996)	Taming the Tiger (1998)	Both Sides Now (2000)

Professional ratings
Review scores
Source	Rating
AllMusic	3/5 stars
Encyclopedia of Popular Music	3/5 stars
Entertainment Weekly	A−
Q	4/5 stars
Robert Christgau	(choice cut)
The Rolling Stone Album Guide	3/5 stars

Taming the Tiger is the sixteenth studio album by the Canadian musician Joni Mitchell. Released on September 29, 1998, through Reprise Records, it is the follow-up to the successful Turbulent Indigo (1994). The album was, at the time, widely believed to be her last of completely original material; this would be disproved with the release of Shine in 2007.

Contributors to Taming the Tiger include Larry Klein on bass and Wayne Shorter on saxophone. The album combines the jazz stylings of much of her work with a textured, ambient-esque sound, indebted to her use of the Roland VG-8 virtual guitar system.

Taming the Tiger did not achieve the same level of success as its predecessor, peaking at number 86 in Mitchell's native Canada and number 75 in the US. The album's highest chart entry, however, was in Norway, where it peaked at number 25. However, it received positive reviews from critics and was considered a continuation of a return to form which started with Night Ride Home (1991).

== Background ==
Taming the Tiger features prominent use of the Roland VG-8 virtual guitar system. This setup allowed Mitchell to switch between different alternate tunings with the press of a button rather than having to retune the guitar between each song – the frustration of which was a main factor in her decision to give up touring after 1983. While the guitar remained in standard tuning, its sound would be processed to create the sound of the alternative tuning she had chosen. The unique sound of the guitar, described by David Yaffe in Reckless Daughter: A Portrait of Joni Mitchell as "a computerized approximation of a guitar with a head cold", created a more atmospheric, ambient sound which is prevalent throughout the album.

== Notable covers ==
"Man from Mars" was covered by Kristen Vigard in the 1996 film, Grace of My Heart. "Man from Mars" was also covered by Chaka Khan in 2000 for her live concert DVD The Jazz Channel Presents Chaka Khan.

== Track listing ==
All tracks composed and arranged by Joni Mitchell; except where indicated

1. "Harlem in Havana" – 4:25
2. "Man from Mars" – 4:09
3. "Love Puts on a New Face" – 3:46
4. "Lead Balloon" – 3:38
5. "No Apologies" – 4:17
6. "Taming the Tiger" – 4:18
7. "The Crazy Cries of Love" (music: Joni Mitchell; lyrics: Don Freed) – 3:54
8. "Stay in Touch" – 2:59
9. "Face Lift" – 4:41
10. "My Best to You" (Gene Willadsen, Isham Jones) – 2:52
11. "Tiger Bones" – 4:18

== Personnel ==
Musicians

- Joni Mitchell – vocals, backing vocals, guitar, keyboards, percussion; bass (tracks 2, 5, 10)
- Femi Jiya – spoken vocals (barker) on "Harlem in Havana"
- Michael Landau – low lead guitar on "Lead Balloon"
- Greg Leisz – pedal steel guitar
- Wayne Shorter – saxophone
- Larry Klein – bass
- Brian Blade – drums
- Mark Isham – trumpet (track 8)

Production

- Dan Marnien, Tony Phillips, Femi Jiya – engineer
- Joni Mitchell, Dan Marnien – mixing
- Joni Mitchell, Robbie Cavolina – art direction

== Charts ==
Chart performance for Taming the Tiger
Chart (1998)	Peak position
Canada Top Albums/CDs (RPM)	86
German Albums (Offizielle Top 100)	79
Norwegian Albums (VG-lista)	25
UK Albums (Official Charts)	57
US Billboard 200	75
Scottish Albums (Official Charts)	90
