= Jose Luis Romanillos Vega =

Spanish luthier

José Luis Romanillos Vega (17 June 1932 – 11 February 2022) was a Spanish luthier, historian, and author.

== Biography ==
Romanillos was born in Madrid in 1932 to a family from the Guadalajara towns of Madrigal and Tordelrábano. At the age of thirteen, he became an apprentice at the Madrid cabinetmaking firm Muebles Caballero, where he learned basic woodworking techniques and gained experience working with different types of wood.

In 1956, when he was 24, Romanillos moved to England to learn English. He worked as a nurse in a psychiatric center and, later, for a cabinet-making business. In 1959, Romanillos married Marian Harris Winspear. The couple had three children: José Luis, Ignacio and Liam.

In 1961, Romanillos built his first guitar for playing flamenco. He called the guitar Toribia, in memory of his mother. Shortly after building his first guitar, Romanillos continued to build more guitars by hand, which he sold at a local market. In 1970, he met the lutenist and guitarist Julian Bream, who offered him the opportunity to set up a workshop on his farm in the English town of Semley. The workshop became well known with its instruments valued for their beauty and acoustic quality.

In 1995, Romanillos retired as a guitar maker, leaving his English workshop in the hands of his son Liam, who continued the family guitar tradition.

== Contributions ==
Romanillos gave lectures and seminars on organology, the history and development of the vihuela and the Spanish guitar. Romanillos was a member of the Crafts Council of Great Britain.

=== Research and publications ===
Romanillos combined his work as a luthier with instrumental research, through which he contributed to the dissemination and recognition of the work of Spanish violin makers. He published three books, in collaboration with his wife Marian Harris Winspear.

- Antonio de Torres: His Life and Work, Institute of Almeria Studies (Almeria, 1983). Foreword by Julian Bream. Translated into six languages: English, Italian, Japanese, German, Spanish and Chinese.
- The Vihuela de mano and the Spanish guitar: A Dictionary of the Makers of Plucked and Bowed Musical Instruments of Spain (1200-2002), The Sanguino Press, (Guijosa, 2002).
- Making a Spanish Guitar, Romanillos, 2013.

== Awards ==
- Honorary Doctorate from the University of Alicante (June 30, 2014)
- Favorite Son of Almeria (June 13, 2017)
- Plaque for regional merit of Castilla-La Mancha (May 31, 2019)
- Adopted Son of the city of Sigüenza (August 8, 2020)

== Bibliography ==
- Antoni Mir and Trinidad Solascasas: José Luis Romanillos, Marian Harris Winspear & the Spanish Guitar, 2008.
