= The Velvet Hour =

Studio album by Bird York
- Released: 2003
- Genre: Trip hop
- Length: 50:00
- Label: Blissed Out Record
- Producer: Larry Klein

Bird York chronology
Bird York (2000)	The Velvet Hour (2003)	Wicked Little High (2006)

The Velvet Hour is a 2003 album by Bird York. It features the song "In the Deep" from the film Crash. Producers on this record include Michael Becker, Bird York, Thom Russo and Larry Klein. It also includes songs heard on CSI: NY, House, Everwood, Jake 2.0, in Seven Pounds and the John Cusack-produced feature Never Get Outta the Boat among others. This record was licensed by EMI from York's label Blissed Out Records in 2006 and rereleased with minor changes as Wicked Little High. York was nominated for an Oscar in 2006 for her song "In the Deep" (which was commissioned by director Paul Haggis for Crash) and performed the song at that year's Oscar ceremony.

== Track listing ==
1. "Haunting You" – 4:25
2. "Open Wider" – 4:39
3. "Wicked Little High (Drawn to You)" – 4:32
4. "Had a Dream" – 5:17
5. "Save Me" – 4:51
6. "Remedy" – 4:44
7. "Lovely Thing" – 4:13
8. "Come Be with Me" – 3:48
9. "Up in Flames" – 4:35
10. "In the Deep" – 3:35
11. "Never Gonna Find Us" – 3:23
12. "Have No Fear" – 2:25
