= Mandolin Brothers =

American musical instrument retailer

Coordinates: 40°37′48.3″N 74°6′36.3″W

Mandolin Brothers was a musical instrument shop in New York City. It was founded in 1971 and was located in Staten Island, New York. It closed the doors of its physical shop in 2017 and was sold to a California buyer who continues the brand online.

== Overview ==
Mandolin Brothers was located on Staten Island, New York. Its clients included Bob Dylan, Joni Mitchell, Paul Simon and Paul McCartney. Bruce Springsteen and George Harrison also visited the store and Joni Mitchell is said to have purchased an antique mandolin at the store. She later wrote about it in "Song for Sharon."

Mandolin Brothers is listed on The New York Music Trail a map of the "Sites of Sound" established by the City of New York and The Host Committee for the Grammy Awards, as a destination for visitors.

== History ==
Mandolin Brothers was established in 1971 by Stan Jay and Harold "Hap" Kuffner. Kuffner left Mandolin Brothers in 1982. The name was chosen by the store's founders as they thought that the mandolin was not getting due recognition in the community.

From 1991 to 1997, Flip Scipio ran the repair department for the Mandolin Brothers.
