= Kathleen York =

American actress and singer-songwriter

Kathleen Marie York
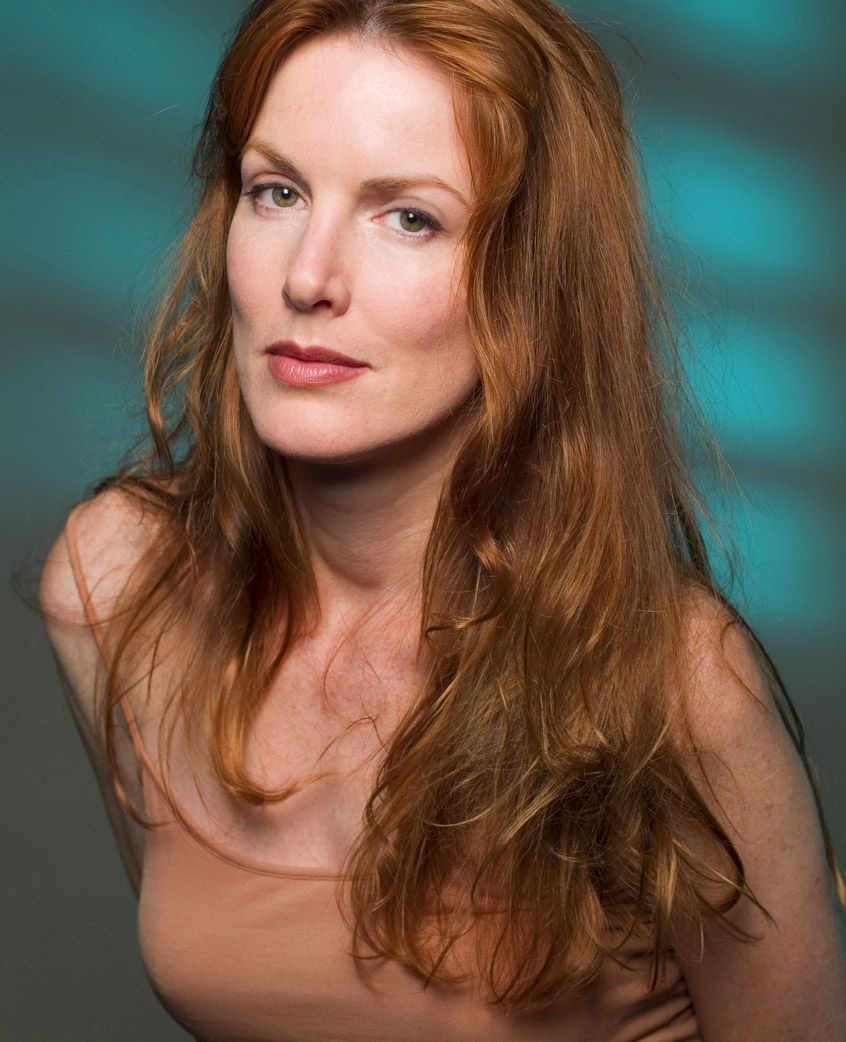
- Born: Chicago, Illinois, U.S.
- Other name: Bird York
- Occupations: Actress; screenwriter; singer-songwriter
- Years active: 1984–present
- Website: www.birdyork.com

Kathleen "Bird" York is an American actress, screenwriter, and Oscar-nominated singer-songwriter recording artist. She was nominated for an Academy Award for Best Original Song for "In the Deep" from the 2004 film Crash.

== Life and career ==
=== Early years ===
York left home when she was 15 years old, following her parents' deaths. After completing high school she attended Columbia College.

=== Actress ===
Acting since her teens, York is most known for her work recurring as Andrea Wyatt in NBC's The West Wing, the Dominick Dunne miniseries A Season in Purgatory, and received critical acclaim for her starring role as Naomi Judd in the NBC miniseries, Naomi & Wynonna: Love Can Build a Bridge. Her film credits include Nightcrawler, Crash, Cries of Silence, The Big Day, I Love You to Death, Flashback, and Cold Feet.

Series regular roles include In the Dark, Vengeance Unlimited, Aaron's Way and The Client List and recurring roles in How to Get Away with Murder, Jane the Virgin, Outcast, Murder One, The O.C. and Desperate Housewives. Guest star appearances include True Blood, Curb Your Enthusiasm, All Rise, Longmire, House, and Revenge.

=== Screenwriter ===
As a screenwriter, York has developed television projects for Sony, Warner Brothers, Fox Television Studios and Fox Broadcasting Network and is an alumnus of The Showrunners Training Program.

=== Singer ===
York uses the name Bird York for her recorded music. She has rejected long-term roles on television, giving priority to her musical work. Her recordings include Wicked Little High, on which she sings and plays acoustic and electric guitars and other instruments. That album includes her song "In the Deep", which was nominated for an Academy Award.

== Filmography ==
Year	Title	Role	Notes
1984	Protocol	Charmaine	
1985	Not My Kid	Linda	
1984–1985	Dallas	Betty	Recurring role, 10 episodes
1985	This Child Is Mine	Janet Rasnick	
1985	Chase	Darlene	
1986	Simon & Simon	Alison Baker	Episode: "A Significant Obsession"
1986	Thompson's Last Run	Louise	
1987	The Alamo: 13 Days to Glory	Mrs. Susannah Dickinson	
1987	Winners Take All	Judy McCormick	
1988	Aaron's Way: The Harvest	Susannah Lo Verde	
1988	Aaron's Way	Susannah Lo Verde	Series regular, 14 episodes
1989	Checking Out	Diana	
1989	Cold Feet	Laura Latham	
1989	Tales from the Crypt	Coralee	Episode: "Dig That Cat... He's Real Gone"
1990	Flashback	Sparkle	
1990	I Love You to Death	Dewey Brown	
1991	Wild Hearts Can't Be Broken	Marie	
1993	Gregory K	Rachel Kingsley	
1993	Love, Lies & Lullabies	Terry	
1993	Dream Lover	Martha	
1994	Sweet Justice	Beth	Episode: "Pilot"
1995	Love Can Build a Bridge	Naomi Judd (impersonation performance)	
1995–1996	Murder One	D.D.A. Cheryl Dreyfuss	3 episodes
1996	A Season in Purgatory	Claire Rafferty	
1996	Cries of Silence	Dorrie Walsh	
1997	To Dance with Olivia	Aurora Watling	
1997	Dead Men Can't Dance	Victoria Elliot	
1997	Northern Lights	Daphne	
1998	The Practice	Sharon	Episode: "The Pursuit of Dignity"
1998–1999	Vengeance Unlimited	KC Griffin	Series regular, 16 episodes
2001	The Big Day	Pam	
2001	Curb Your Enthusiasm	Masseuse	Episode: "The Massage"
2002	The Guardian	Janine Crane	Episode: "Assuming the Position"
2004	Crash	Officer Johnson	
2004–2005	The O.C.	Renee Wheeler	Recurring role, 4 episodes
2006	A House Divided	First Lady Susan Russell	TV Pilot
2006	Malcolm in the Middle	Ellie	Episode: "Mono"
2000–2006	The West Wing	Congresswoman Andrea "Andy" Wyatt	Recurring role, 15 episodes
2006–2007	Desperate Housewives	Monique Polier	3 episodes
2007	Sublime	Jenny	
2007	NCIS	Stephanie Flynn	Episode: "Ex-File"
2007	House, M.D.	Dr. Schaffer	Episode: "97 Seconds"
2007	Ghost Whisperer	Vivian Sembrook	Episode: "Bad Blood"
2008	Ball Don't Lie	Mrs. Smith	
2008	Front of the Class	Diane	
2009	CSI: Crime Scene Investigation	A.D.A. Hardt	Episode: "Miscarriage of Justice"
2009	CSI: Miami	Paula Olsen	Episode: "Count Me Out"
2010	The Glades	Dr. Britney Newhall	Episode: "Cassadaga"
2010	Chase	Ellen Mays	Episode: "The Comeback Kida"
2010	Footsteps	Megan	
2011	Body of Proof	Councilwoman Jill Bennett	Episode: "Lazarus Man"
2012	The Client List	Jolene	Series regular, 10 episodes
2012	CSI: NY	Krista DiBello	Episode: "The Lady in the Lake"
2013	Bones	Marianne Thorn	Episode: "The Secret in the Proposal"
2013	Revenge	Sheila Lurie	Episode: "Mercy"
2014	Nightcrawler	Jackie	
2014	True Blood	Madeline Kapneck	Episode: "Karma"
2014	Castle	Kat Kingsley	Episode: "Last Action Hero"
2014	Longmire	Penny VanBlarcom	Episode: Reports of My Death
2015	Major Crimes	Janice Clark	Episode: "Hostage of Fortune"
2015–2016	Jane the Virgin	Angelique Harper	2 Episodes
2017	Outcast	Jeanne	2 Episodes
2018	Code Black	Vicky Markwith	Episode #3.12
2019–2022	In the Dark	Joy Mason	Series regular
2020	How to Get Away with Murder	Martha Vitkay	5 episodes

== Discography ==
- Bird York (1999, Blissed Out Records)
- The Velvet Hour (2005, Blissed Out Records)
- Wicked Little High (2006, EMI) licensed only
- Wicked Little High (2012, re-released Bird In The Hand Music)
- Have No Fear EP (2008, Blissed Out Records)
