= In the Deep =

Song by Bird York

from the album The Velvet Hour
- Length: 3:33
- Producer: Larry Klein

"In the Deep" is a 2003 song written by Michael Becker and Kathleen York, performed by York under her stage name Bird York. The song gained fame from its use in the 2004 critically acclaimed film Crash; it also appeared on York's album The Velvet Hour. In 2006, the song was nominated for the Academy Award for Best Original Song. York performed the song at the 78th Academy Awards ceremony on March 5, 2006.

There was some controversy and question as to the song's eligibility, as it had appeared in the film The Civilization of Maxwell Bright as well as The Velvet Hour, both of which were released before Crash. However, the Academy of Motion Picture Arts and Sciences determined that the song had been commissioned in 2001 or 2002 by Crash director Paul Haggis for use in the film, prior to its other uses; thus it was eligible.

In March 2003, Bird York managed to chart in the U.S., with "In the Deep" peaking at number 64 on the Billboard Hot 100 and number 29 on the digital downloads chart. The song fell from the chart in its second week of resurgence.

The song was featured in an episode of House, M.D., entitled "Autopsy", an episode of CSI: NY, entitled "Stealing Home", and an episode of Warehouse 13, entitled "No Pain, No Gain". It was used as the background music in the trailer for the programme Ocean Giants, the first episode of which screened on BBC One in the UK on Sunday, August 14, 2011.
