= Travelogue (Joni Mitchell album) =

2002 studio album by Joni Mitchell

Studio album by Joni Mitchell
- Released: 19 November 2002
- Studio: Ocean Way (Hollywood); AIR Lyndhurst (London); Record One (Los Angeles); Market Street (Santa Monica)
- Genre: Orchestral
- Length: 126:23
- Label: Nonesuch
- Producer: Larry Klein; Joni Mitchell

Joni Mitchell chronology
Both Sides Now (2000)	Travelogue (2002)	The Beginning of Survival (2004)

Professional ratings
Review scores
Source	Rating
Allmusic	4.5/5 stars
Encyclopedia of Popular Music	3/5 stars
Entertainment Weekly	A−
Robert Christgau	(dud)
Rolling Stone	2/5 stars
DownBeat	3.5/5 stars

Travelogue is the eighteenth studio album by Canadian musician Joni Mitchell. It was released on November 19, 2002, through Nonesuch Records. A double album, it was co-produced by Mitchell and Larry Klein, and consists of re-recordings of songs from Mitchell's back catalogue with orchestral arrangements by Vince Mendoza. At the time of its release, Mitchell announced it would be her last album, though it was later succeeded by Shine in 2007.

The album was not commercially successful and failed to chart, as well as receiving mixed reviews from critics. However, Mendoza won a 2004 Grammy award for Best Instrumental Arrangement Accompanying Vocalist(s) for his arrangement of "Woodstock". As of 2007, the two-disc set had sold 72,000 copies in the US.

== Reception ==
JazzTimes reviewer Christopher Louden wrote, "Tough as it is to rationalize, Joni Mitchell’s pack-a-day habit seems only to have enriched that exquisite voice of hers . . . Mitchell’s nicotine-stained throatiness shapes a vaguely melancholy sagacity that is stunningly beautiful".

Thom Jurek gave the album 4.5 stars for AllMusic and called it "a textured and poetic reminiscence, not a reappraisal, of her work ".

DownBeat gave the release 3.5 stars. The review said the album "is like eating high-grade, unsweetened dark chocolate. It's a rich, deep and powerful experience that demands an acquired taste . . . The lady's voice has changed (deepened mostly) but is still a compelling instrument and her deliberate vocal approach yields many fine rewards. Still, this collection is often weighed down by the seriousness of the project and feels mannered when it should be free".

== Track listing ==
All tracks are written by Joni Mitchell, except "Unchained Melody" by Alex North and Hy Zaret.

Disc one
No.	Title	Length
1.	"Otis and Marlena"	3:52
2.	"Amelia"	6:46
3.	"You Dream Flat Tires"	3:46
4.	"Love"	5:38
5.	"Woodstock"	5:54
6.	"Slouching Towards Bethlehem" (based on a poem by W. B. Yeats)	7:09
7.	"Judgement of the Moon and Stars (Ludwig's Tune)"	5:20
8.	"The Sire of Sorrow (Job's Sad Song)"	7:09
9.	"For the Roses"	7:28
10.	"Trouble Child"	5:02
11.	"God Must Be a Boogie Man"	3:56
Total length:		62:00

Disc two
No.	Title	Length
1.	"Be Cool"	5:09
2.	"Just Like This Train"	5:04
3.	"Sex Kills"	3:57
4.	"Refuge of the Roads"	7:56
5.	"Hejira"	6:47
6.	"Chinese Café/Unchained Melody"	5:41
7.	"Cherokee Louise"	6:00
8.	"The Dawntreader"	5:38
9.	"The Last Time I Saw Richard"	4:58
10.	"Borderline"	6:23
11.	"The Circle Game"	6:50
Total length:		64:23

== Personnel ==
- Joni Mitchell – vocals, art direction, photography, painting
- Larry Klein – bass, musical direction
- Herbie Hancock, John Lenehan – piano
- Billy Preston – Hammond B3 organ
- Chuck Berghofer – acoustic double bass
- Paulinho da Costa – percussion
- Brian Blade – drums
- Wayne Shorter, Phil Todd – soprano saxophone
- Plas Johnson – tenor saxophone
- Kenny Wheeler – flugelhorn
- Gavyn Wright – orchestra leader
- Vince Mendoza – conductor, arrangement
- Kris Johnson – background vocals
- Chris Laurence, David Ayre, Leon Bosch, Mary Scully, Patrick Lannigan, Simon Benson – bass
- Dave Stewart – bass trombone
- Gavin McNaughton, Julie Andrews, Robin O'Neill – bassoon
- Anthony Pleeth, David Bucknall, David Daniels, Frank Schaefer, Helen Liebmann, Jonathan Tunnell, Martin Loveday, Paul Kegg, Robin Firman, Stephen Orton, Tony Lewis – cello
- Andrew Busher, David Porter-Thomas, Donald Greig, Gerard O'Beirne, Graham Godfrey, Jeremy Birchall, Jeremy Rose, John Bowley, John Kingsley-Smith, Jonathan Arnold, Jonathan Rathbone, Lindsay Benson, Matthew Brook, Metro Voices, Michael Dore, Michael Pearn, Robert Evans, Robert Johnston, Robert Kearley, Simon Grant, Stephen Charlesworth – choir
- Jenny O'Grady – choir conductor
- David Fuest, Heather Nicholl, Nicholas Bucknall – clarinet
- Richard Skinner – contrabassoon
- Isobel Griffiths – orchestra contractor
- Sue Bohling – cornet
- Andrew Findon, Anna Noakes, Helen Keen – flute
- Helen Tunstall, Hugh Webb, Skaila Kanga – harp
- David Pyatt, John Pigneguy, Michael Thompson, Philip Eastop, Richard Berry, Richard Bissill, Richard Watkins, Simon Rayner – horn
- Jacob Heringman – lute
- Chris Cowie, John Anderson, Sue Bohling – oboe
- Chris Baron, Frank Ricotti, Glyn Matthews, Steve Henderson, William Lockhart – percussion
- Mike Hext, Pete Beachill, Peter Davies, Richard Edwards, Roger Harvey – trombone
- Andy Crowley, Derek Watkins, John Barclay, Kenny Wheeler, Paul Archibald, Simon Gardner, Stuart Brooks – trumpet
- Andy Crowley – c-trumpet
- Owen Slade – tuba
- Bob Smissem, Bruce White, Catherine Bradshaw, Donald McVay, Garfield Jackson, Gustav Clarkson, Justin Ward, Peter Lale, Philip Dukes, Rachel Bolt, Tim Grant, Zoe Lake – viola
- Antonia Fuchs, Ben Cruft, Boguslaw Kostecki, Cathy Thompson, Chris Tombling, David Emanuel, David Woodcock, Dermot Crehan, Douglas Mackie, Elizabeth Edwards, Everton Nelson, Helen Hathorn, Jackie Shave, Jim McLeod, Jonathan Evans-Jones, Jonathan Rees, Jonathan Strange, Julian Leaper, Katherine Shave, Mark Berrow, Michael McMenemy, Patrick Kiernan, Paul Willey, Perry Montague-Mason, Peter Hanson, Rebecca Hirsch, Rita Manning, Simon Fischer, Warren Zielinski – violin

Technical

- Geoff Foster, Helix Hadar – recording
- Allen Sides – mixing
- Cindi Peters, Dana Pilson – production coordination

== Charts ==
Weekly chart performance for Travelogue
Chart (2002)	Peak position
Finnish Albums (Suomen virallinen lista)	28
UK Jazz & Blues Albums (OCC)	6
