= Hejira (album) =

Studio album by Joni Mitchell
- Released: November 21, 1976
- Recorded: 1976
- Studio: A&M (Hollywood)
- Genres: Folk rock; folk jazz
- Length: 51:54
- Label: Asylum
- Producers: Joni Mitchell; Henry Lewy

Joni Mitchell chronology
The Hissing of Summer Lawns (1975)	Hejira (1976)	Don Juan's Reckless Daughter (1977)

Singles from Hejira
- 1. "Coyote" Released: January 1977

Hejira is the eighth studio album by Canadian singer-songwriter Joni Mitchell, released in 1976 on Asylum Records. Its material was written during a period of ongoing travel in late 1975 and early 1976, and reflects Mitchell's experiences on the road during that time. It is characterized by lyrically dense, sprawling songs and musical backing by several jazz-oriented instrumentalists, most prominently fretless bass player Jaco Pastorius, guitarist Larry Carlton, and drummer John Guerin.

The album did not sell as well as its predecessors, peaking at No. 22 in Mitchell's native Canada. It reached No. 13 on the Billboard 200 pop album chart in the United States, where it was certified gold by the RIAA, and No. 11 in the UK, where it attained a silver certification. Critically, the album was generally well received, and in the years since its release, Hejira has been considered one of the high marks of her career. The lead track "Coyote" was released as a single.

== Background ==
According to Mitchell, the album was written during or after three journeys she took in late 1975 and the first half of 1976. The first was a stint as a member of Bob Dylan's Rolling Thunder Revue in late 1975. During this time, she became a frequent cocaine user. Then, in February 1976, Mitchell was scheduled to play about six weeks of concert dates across the US promoting The Hissing of Summer Lawns. However, the relationship between Mitchell and her boyfriend John Guerin (who was her drummer on the string of dates) had soured. Tensions became so fraught that the tour was abandoned about halfway through.

The third trip came soon after when Mitchell traveled across America with two men, one of them a former lover from Australia. This trip inspired six of the songs on the album. She drove with her two friends from Los Angeles to Maine, and then went back to California alone via Florida and the Gulf of Mexico. On her way back home, Mitchell met with the Tibetan Buddhist master Chogyam Trungpa in Colorado, an event she credited with curing her cocaine addiction and leaving her in a selfless "awakened state" that lasted three days.

During some of her solo journeys, Mitchell donned a red wig and sunglasses, and told the various strangers she met that her name was either "Charlene Latimer" or "Joan Black". Despite the disguise, Mitchell was still sometimes recognized. She traveled without a driver's licence and stayed behind truckers, relying on their habit of signaling when the police were ahead of them; consequently, she only drove in daylight hours.

== Recording ==
During the recording of her albums Court and Spark and The Hissing of Summer Lawns, Mitchell had grown increasingly frustrated by the rock session musicians who had been hired to perform her music. "There were grace notes and subtleties and things that I thought were getting kind of buried." The session musicians in turn recommended that Mitchell start looking for jazz instrumentalists to perform on her records. In addition, her relationship with the drummer John Guerin, which lasted through a significant portion of the mid-1970s, influenced her decision to move more towards experimental jazz music and further away from her folk and pop roots.

After recording the basic tracks that would become Hejira, Mitchell met the bassist Jaco Pastorius and they formed an immediate musical connection. Mitchell was dissatisfied with what she called the "dead, distant bass sound" of the 1960s and early 1970s, and was beginning to wonder why the bass always had to play the root of a chord. She overdubbed Pastorius's bass parts on four of the tracks on Hejira and released the album on November 21, 1976.

Dominated by Mitchell's guitar and Pastorius's fretless bass, the album drew on a range of influences but was more cohesive and accessible than some of her later, more jazz-oriented work. "Coyote", "Amelia", and "Hejira" became concert staples, especially after being featured on the live album Shadows and Light, alongside "Furry Sings the Blues" and "Black Crow".

== Album title ==
The album title is an unusual transliteration of the Arabic word more commonly rendered as Hijrah or Hegira, which means "departure" or "exodus", usually referring to the migration of the Islamic prophet Muhammad and his companions from Mecca to Medina in 622. Mitchell later stated that when she chose the title, she was looking for a word that meant "running away with honor". She found the word "hejira" while reading the dictionary, and was drawn to the "dangling j, like in Aja ... it's leaving the dream, no blame".

== Cover art ==
The portrait of Mitchell on the front cover was taken by Norman Seeff and the other photographs were taken by Joel Bernstein at Lake Mendota in Madison, Wisconsin, after an ice storm. The figure skater Toller Cranston appears on the back cover. During a 1994 interview with Rolling Stone, Mitchell cited the cover of Hejira as one of which she was particularly proud: "A lot of work went into that."

== Songs ==
Mitchell has described the album as "really inspired ... there is this restless feeling throughout it ... The sweet loneliness of solitary travel", and has said that "I suppose a lot of people could have written a lot of my other songs, but I feel the songs on Hejira could only have come from me."

Hejira opens with "Coyote", about a one-night stand with a ladies' man, who has been speculated to be the playwright and actor Sam Shepard. Mitchell would later perform the song with The Band at their 1976 farewell concert, the recording of which was eventually released under the title The Last Waltz (1978).

The second track on Hejira, "Amelia", was inspired by Mitchell's breakup with John Guerin, and described by her as almost an exact account of her experience in the desert. The song interweaves a story of a desert journey (the "hejira within the hejira") with the famous aviator Amelia Earhart who mysteriously vanished during a flight over the Pacific Ocean. Mitchell has commented on the origins of the song: "I was thinking of Amelia Earhart and addressing it from one solo pilot to another ... sort of reflecting on the cost of being a woman and having something you must do." The song, each verse of which ends with the refrain "Amelia, it was just a false alarm", repeatedly shifts between two keys, giving it a constant unsettled feeling.

"Furry Sings the Blues", with Neil Young on harmonica, is an account of Mitchell meeting the blues guitarist and singer Furry Lewis in Beale Street, Memphis, during a period when the surrounding area was being demolished. Lewis was displeased with Mitchell's use of his name. Mitchell would return to the song live in concert throughout the years. Like "Coyote", "Furry Sings the Blues" was sung by Mitchell at The Band's farewell concert. This version of the song was not included on the 1978 version of The Last Waltz, but was included on the 2002 re-release.

"A Strange Boy" recounts the affair Mitchell had with one of the men she was traveling with from Los Angeles to Maine, a flight attendant in his thirties who lived with his parents.

"Hejira" is about Mitchell's reasons for leaving Guerin, and Mitchell described it as "probably the toughest tune on the album to write". It features the bass work of Pastorius, who was inspired by Mitchell's use of multi-tracking with her guitar to mix four separate tracks of his carefully arranged bass parts, having them all play together at certain points of the tune.

Side two of Hejira begins with the epic "Song for Sharon", which at eight minutes and 40 seconds is the longest track on the album. The lyrics deal with the conflict faced by a woman who is deciding between freedom and marriage. The song refers to places Mitchell went during her trip to New York City in Spring 1976, including scenes at the Mandolin Brothers guitar store in Staten Island (Note: Mitchell bought a 1915 Gibson Mandocello and a Martin herringbone guitar. She began writing the song on the ferry back to Manhattan.) and a visit to a fortune teller on Bleecker Street. The song was allegedly written while Mitchell was high on cocaine at the end of her visit to the city. The namesake of the song was her childhood friend Sharon Bell, who studied voice and wanted to be a singer when she was young but married a farmer; Mitchell wanted to be a farmer's wife, but ended up becoming a singer. The song also mentions the blowout fight and abandoned midwestern tour that marked the end of Mitchell's relationship with Guerin: "I left my man at a North Dakota junction, and I came out to the Big Apple here to face the dream's malfunction." According to Mitchell's biographer Sheila Weller, "Song For Sharon" also makes a coded reference to the March 1976 suicide of Jackson Browne's wife, the fashion model Phyllis Major. Browne and Mitchell had a brief, "high-strung" affair in 1972; on at least one occasion, Browne allegedly physically abused Mitchell. After their relationship dissolved, Browne quickly married Major. Although Major had died from a barbiturate overdose, Mitchell sang "A woman I knew just drowned herself", and questioned if her suicide was a means of "punishing somebody".

The lyrics of "Black Crow" deal with the practical difficulty for Mitchell of traveling from her second home on British Columbia's Sunshine Coast.

"Blue Motel Room" was written at the DeSoto Beach Motel in Savannah, Georgia. The song was inspired by the first breakup of the on-again-off-again relationship between Mitchell and Guerin. The lyrics express Mitchell's hopes of rekindling their relationship, and she tells her love interest to rebuff any other suitors: "Tell those girls that you've got German measles, honey tell 'em you've got germs."

"Refuge of the Roads" was written about a three-day visit that Mitchell had made to the controversial Buddhist meditation master Chögyam Trungpa in Colorado on her way back to Los Angeles. According to Mitchell, it was during this visit in early 1976 that Trungpa cured her of her cocaine addiction. She described herself as subsequently falling into an "awakened" state for three days, characterized by "no sense of self, no self-consciousness; my mind was back in Eden, the mind before the Fall. It was simple-minded, blessedly simple-minded." She would later say that this track was one of her favorite songs of those she had written, and would rerecord the tune, along with "Amelia" and "Hejira", with a full orchestra for her 2002 album Travelogue. The song also alludes to the Apollo 8 astronaut William Anders's celebrated photograph of the Earth rising over the Moon, Earthrise.

== Release ==
The album was released on November 21, 1976, by Asylum Records. Despite reaching number 13 on the Billboard 200 pop album chart and attaining a RIAA gold certification, it did not garner significant radio airplay.

== Reception ==
Professional ratings
Review scores
Source	Rating
AllMusic	3.5/5 stars
Christgau's Record Guide	B+
Encyclopedia of Popular Music	4/5 stars
The Great Rock Discography	9/10 stars
Le Guide du CD	4/5 stars
MusicHound Rock	3/5
Pitchfork	10/10
The Rolling Stone Album Guide	3.5/5 stars
Polari Magazine	5/5 stars

Reviewing for Rolling Stone, Ariel Swartley observed that Mitchell had abandoned memorable tunes in favor of "new, seductive rhythms", "lush guitars", and "spare instrumentation", with the resulting sound "as sophisticated and arresting as anything she's done... as unceasing and hypnotic as the freeways Mitchell describes in her songs". Swartley also praised the lyrics as "some of her most incisive and humorous", and credited her voice with a "new warmth". The Village Voice critic Robert Christgau was impressed with the way that "Mitchell subjugates melody to the natural music of language itself", but wondered whether "the reflections of a rich, faithless, compulsively mobile, and compulsively romantic female" were substantially more interesting than those of her male counterparts, "especially the third or fourth time around".

In his five star review for Sounds magazine, British music journalist Tim Lott wrote: "On a commercial level, this is manifestly the most non-instant album she has ever produced. Her unique style of using instrumentation as punctuation rather than as overblown soundtracking reaches full conclusion here". British rock critic Nick Kent wrote in the New Musical Express that Hejira is Mitchell's "soul-to-soul statement circa 1976", and "her melodies are inevitably both utterly relaxing and stimulating, and the Pastorius/Carlton duo are just stunning in these spartan settings". He also noted that "this is no worthy successor to Summer Lawns ... because most of the sentiments here have been presented before".

In a 2022 review for Pitchfork, Jenn Pelly described the album as "restless music of road and sky [in which] narratives unfurl with driving forward motion", adding that "the fretless bass, spare percussion, and unusual harmonics depict [Mitchell's] wintry lucidity."

Musicians such as Björk, Danielle Haim, Weyes Blood, and St. Vincent have named the album as a favorite.

== Accolades ==
In 1991, Rolling Stone placed the cover at No. 11 on its list of best album covers.

The record was voted number 776 in the third edition of Colin Larkin's All Time Top 1000 Albums (2000). In the 2020 edition of Rolling Stone's 500 Greatest Albums of All Time, it was ranked No. 133.

== Track listing ==
All tracks are written by Joni Mitchell.

Side one
No.	Title	Length
1.	"Coyote"	5:01
2.	"Amelia"	6:01
3.	"Furry Sings the Blues"	5:07
4.	"A Strange Boy"	4:15
5.	"Hejira"	6:42
Total length:		27:06

Side two
No.	Title	Length
6.	"Song for Sharon"	8:40
7.	"Black Crow"	4:22
8.	"Blue Motel Room"	5:04
9.	"Refuge of the Roads"	6:42
Total length:		24:48

== Personnel ==
Taken from liner notes of original US vinyl pressing

=== Musicians ===
- Joni Mitchell – vocals (all tracks), rhythm guitar (1–7, 9), electric guitar (8)
- Larry Carlton – lead guitar (1, 2, 4, 7), acoustic guitar (8)
- Bobbye Hall – percussion (1, 4, 5)
- Jaco Pastorius – fretless bass (1, 5, 7, 9)
- Victor Feldman – vibes (2)
- Max Bennett – bass guitar (3, 6)
- John Guerin – drums (3, 6, 8, 9)
- Neil Young – harmonica (3)
- Abe Most – clarinet (5)
- Chuck Domanico – double bass (8)
- Chuck Findley, Tom Scott – horns (9)

=== Technical ===
- Henry Lewy – production, recording, mixing
- Steve Katz – assistant production, mixing
- Keith Williamson – art director
- Joel Bernstein, Norman Seeff – photography

== Charts ==
=== Weekly charts ===
Weekly chart performance for Hejira
Chart (1976–1977)	Peak position
Australian Albums (Kent Music Report)	38
Canada Top Albums/CDs (RPM)	22
UK Albums (Official Charts)	11
US Billboard 200	13
US Cash Box Top 100 Albums	12

Chart (2024)	Peak position
Hungarian Physical Albums (MAHASZ)	25

=== Year-end charts ===
Chart (1977)	Position
Canada (RPM)	94

== Certifications ==
Region	Certification	Certified units/sales
Australia (ARIA)	Gold	35,000^{^}
United Kingdom (BPI)	Silver	60,000^{^}
United States (RIAA)	Gold	500,000^{^}
^{^} Shipments figures based on certification alone.
