= Turbulent Indigo =

Studio album by Joni Mitchell
- Released: October 25, 1994
- Recorded: 1993
- Studios: The Kiva (Los Angeles, California)
- Genre: Adult alternative
- Length: 43:06
- Label: Reprise
- Producers: Joni Mitchell, Larry Klein

Joni Mitchell chronology
Night Ride Home (1991)	Turbulent Indigo (1994)	Hits (1996)

Singles from Turbulent Indigo
- 1. "How Do You Stop" Released: 1994 (Europe and Australia)

Professional ratings
Review scores
Source	Rating
AllMusic	3/5 stars
The Encyclopedia of Popular Music	3/5 stars
Entertainment Weekly	B+
Los Angeles Times	4/4 stars
NME	5/10
Q	4/5 stars
Rolling Stone	4/5 stars

Turbulent Indigo is the fifteenth album by Canadian singer-songwriter Joni Mitchell, released in 1994.

The album won a Grammy Award for Best Pop Album. John Milward, writing for Rolling Stone, wrote that it was Mitchell's "best album since the mid-'70s".

As of December 2007, the album has sold 311,000 copies in the US.

== Background ==
The album marked her return to Warner Music (formerly WEA) distribution after her previous album, Night Ride Home, was distributed by MCA for its then-newly purchased subsidiary Geffen Records (which, prior to the sale to MCA, had distributed through WEA).

== Music ==
The song "Turbulent Indigo" refers to van Gogh, while describing the mental turmoil both he and Mitchell face in the creative process. The song "Not to Blame" was rumored to be about Mitchell's fellow singer-songwriter and former lover Jackson Browne, who was alleged to have beaten his girlfriend, actress Daryl Hannah.

Mitchell also takes in non-personal issues, notably in the song "Magdalene Laundries", which recounts the sufferings of Irish women once consigned to Magdalen Asylums run by the Roman Catholic Church and made to work in the asylums' laundries. Similarly, the song "Sex Kills" referenced a number of late 20th century topical issues, including violence, AIDS, global warming and consumerism.

== Artwork ==
According to Matt Mitchell of Paste Magazine, the album's cover artwork features a self portrait of Mitchell "styl[ing] herself as a Vincent Van Gogh type."

== Critical reception ==
Turbulent Indigo received critical acclaim. Q's Tom Doyle called the album a "welcome return to the atmospherics and acoustic terrain she's best known for", further writing that "The majority of the tracks here recall the wafting soundscapes of 1976's Hejira, with gentle, controlled feedback, Pastorius-styled bass, Wayne Shorter's tumbling saxophone patterns and walls of acoustic guitars providing a dramatic backdrop for Mitchell's bold lyrical imagery."

== Track listing ==
All tracks composed by Joni Mitchell; except where indicated

1. "Sunny Sunday" – 2:21
2. "Sex Kills" – 3:56
3. "How Do You Stop" (Charlie Midnight, Dan Hartman) – 4:09
4. "Turbulent Indigo" – 3:34
5. "Last Chance Lost" – 3:14
6. "The Magdalene Laundries" – 4:02
7. "Not to Blame" – 4:18
8. "Borderline" – 4:48
9. "Yvette in English" (Mitchell, David Crosby) – 5:16
10. "The Sire of Sorrow (Job's Sad Song)" – 7:08

== Personnel ==
- Joni Mitchell – vocals, guitar, keyboards
- Larry Klein – organ, bass
- Wayne Shorter – soprano saxophone on tracks: 1, 4, 7, 9, 10
- Jim Keltner – drums on "Sunny Sunday"
- Carlos Vega – drums on tracks: 3, 4, 7
- Michael Landau – electric guitar on tracks: 2, 3
- Greg Leisz – pedal steel guitar on tracks: 7, 8
- Steuart Smith – guitar on "How Do You Stop"
- Seal – vocals on "How Do You Stop"
- Bill Dillon – synthesizer on "Yvette in English"
- Charles Valentino – backing vocals on "Yvette in English"
- Kris Kello – backing vocals on "Yvette in English"

== Charts ==
Chart performance for Turbulent Indigo
Chart (1994)	Peak position
Canada Top Albums/CDs (RPM)	24
UK Albums (Official Charts)	53
US Billboard 200	47
Scottish Albums (Official Charts)	60
US Cash Box Top 100 Albums	42

== Certifications ==
Certifications for Turbulent Indigo
Region	Certification	Certified units/sales
Canada (Music Canada)	Gold	50,000^{^}
^{^} Shipments figures based on certification alone.
