= Chalk Mark in a Rain Storm =

Studio album by Joni Mitchell
- Released: March 23, 1988
- Recorded: 1986–1987
- Studios: Ashcombe House (Somerset); The Wool Hall (Bath); Artisan Sound (Hollywood); A&M (Hollywood); Village Recorders (Los Angeles); Ocean Way (Los Angeles); Galaxy (Los Angeles); Ground Control (Los Angeles); Soundcastle (Hollywood)
- Genres: New-age; easy listening
- Length: 46:25
- Label: Geffen
- Producers: Joni Mitchell; Larry Klein

Joni Mitchell chronology
Dog Eat Dog (1985)	Chalk Mark in a Rain Storm (1988)	Night Ride Home (1991)

Singles from Chalk Mark in a Rain Storm
- 1. "My Secret Place" Released: May 23, 1988

Chalk Mark in a Rain Storm is the thirteenth studio album by Canadian singer-songwriter Joni Mitchell, released on March 23, 1988, by Geffen Records. Her third release on the label, the album features duets with a number of artists such as Peter Gabriel on "My Secret Place", Willie Nelson on "Cool Water", Don Henley on "Snakes and Ladders", and Billy Idol and Tom Petty on the track "Dancin' Clown". Henley also performs backing vocals on "Lakota", and Wendy and Lisa perform backing vocals on "The Tea Leaf Prophecy (Lay Down Your Arms)".

== Background and recording ==
In early 1986, Mitchell and Larry Klein visited Peter Gabriel's Ashcombe House recording studio near Bath, England. Since Gabriel had mostly finished his album So by that time, he offered Mitchell and Klein the use of his studio if they wanted to record. They did, and the result was the track "My Secret Place", a duet between Mitchell and Gabriel. Mitchell told Musician magazine about this song: "It's a love beginning song. The song's about the threshold of intimacy. It's a shared thing so I wanted it to be like the Song of Solomon, where you can't tell what gender it is. It's the uniting spirit of two people at the beginning of a relationship".

The album features several guest collaborators, including Ben Orr, who Mitchell met while Orr was working with Klein. Mitchell had first seen Billy Idol perform at the Grammy Awards and decided to contact him during the recording sessions of Chalk Mark in a Rain Storm. Idol recorded his parts the following day, with Mitchell later calling him "a delight to work with". Mitchell was introduced to Wendy & Lisa through Prince. At the time of the Chalk Mark in a Rain Storm recording sessions, Wendy & Lisa were working at the same studio as Mitchell, so the duo agreed to provide backing vocals after a discussion at a coffee machine. Mitchell had met Willie Nelson at Farm Aid and invited him to participate on the album.

Similar to her previous album, Dog Eat Dog, Mitchell used drum machines on Chalk Mark in a Rain Storm. Manu Katché, who had played on Peter Gabriel's So along with Klein, was brought in to play drums on Chalk Mark in a Rainstorm. During the sessions with Katché, Mitchell would share the lyrics with him, explain their meaning, and provide him with an overview of the musical ideas she had in mind for each song. Katché said that "with Joni, we used drum machines, but in a lot of different ways—a lot of programming of percussion and drums, more like what Peter does."

While reminiscing about her friendship with saxophonist Wayne Shorter, Mitchell recalled their unusual style of collaboration, explaining that since both she and he were painters, they possessed a "visual" understanding of music, where she could abstractly describe an emotion or a scene for him that he would translate in to his playing, an attribute she claimed was unique to him as a saxophone player. Before recording "A Bird That Whistles (Corrina, Corrina)", Mitchell gave Shorter the simple direction that he was "the bird on [the song]", and from there, "the first lick he made was so bird-like, it was perfect". He immediately requested the opportunity to record a second take after finishing his first, but Joni refused, being happy with what she just heard him play. She later said that in that moment Shorter had "slept through his own magic".

== Themes ==
Contemporary commercialism is addressed in the songs "Number One", "Lakota" which deals with the destruction of Native American culture and the unusual "The Reoccurring Dream" was constructed from samples Mitchell collected by recording TV commercials on her VCR for 2 weeks. "Cool Water" (a Mitchell rewrite of the Bob Nolan original) also discusses water pollution.

War is explored in two very different stories: "The Tea Leaf Prophecy (Lay Down Your Arms)" tells the tale of Mitchell's parents meeting during World War II after a prophetic tea-leaf reading, while "The Beat of Black Wings" is about an embittered Vietnam vet named Killer Kyle, who found it difficult to get the sound of helicopter blades out of his head.

== Release ==
Professional ratings
Review scores
Source	Rating
AllMusic	3/5 stars
Robert Christgau	C
The Encyclopedia of Popular Music	3/5 stars
Hi-Fi News & Record Review	A*:1
Rolling Stone	3/5 stars

Chalk Mark in a Rain Storm was released in March 1988, and the song "Snakes and Ladders" (featuring Don Henley) was issued as a pre-release single to radio stations in January 1988. The first official single from the album was "My Secret Place". The video was shot on grainy, atmospheric black-and-white film featuring Mitchell and Peter Gabriel, and got some airplay on VH-1, where it premiered in May 1988. The video was directed by Dutch photographer and film director Anton Corbijn, perhaps known best for his many music videos for Depeche Mode.

Billboard magazine called Chalk Mark in a Rain Storm Mitchell's "most commercial sounding effort in years" and was complimentary of the album's "cerebral lyrics" and "shimmering pop hooks". Other reviews were mostly very favorable, with publications such as Music Week noting the cameo appearances of musicians such as Thomas Dolby and Don Henley. It also called it"another superbly innovative, ecoogically sound, if ultimately pessimistic LP." Fred Dellar of Hi-Fi News & Record Review believed that the strongest material on the album was on side two, where they highlighted her cover of "Cool Water", saying that it was "so immaculately re-shaped it sounds like next year's thing."

The album improved on the chart position of her previous album, 1985's Dog Eat Dog, peaking at number 23 in Canada, 45 on the US Billboard 200, and number 26 in the UK.

To promote the album, Mitchell also travelled to the UK in May and appeared on the Channel 4 music show Wired where she performed "Number One" and gave an exclusive world premiere of the song "Fourth of July", which would later be retitled "Night Ride Home" and be recorded as the title track for her next album. She also visited Australia and appeared on several television shows including The Midday Show with Ray Martin, Rock Arena, and the morning show Sunday where she again performed "Number One" and "Fourth of July".

Chalk Mark in a Rain Storm was nominated for Best Pop Vocal Performance, Female at the 1989 Grammy Awards, but lost to Tracy Chapman's "Fast Car".

== Track listing ==
All lyrics are written by Joni Mitchell except "Cool Water" (lyrics by Bob Nolan with revised lyrics by Mitchell).

Side one
No.	Title	Music	Length
1.	"My Secret Place"	Joni Mitchell	5:01
2.	"Number One"	Mitchell	3:46
3.	"Lakota"	Mitchell; Larry Klein	6:25
4.	"The Tea Leaf Prophecy (Lay Down Your Arms)"	Mitchell; Klein	4:49
5.	"Dancin' Clown"	Mitchell	4:09

Side two
No.	Title	Music	Length
1.	"Cool Water"	Bob Nolan	5:25
2.	"The Beat of Black Wings"	Mitchell	5:19
3.	"Snakes and Ladders"	Mitchell; Klein	5:37
4.	"The Reoccurring Dream"	Mitchell	3:02
5.	"A Bird That Whistles" (arrangement of the traditional work "Corrina, Corrina")	Mitchell	2:38

== Personnel ==
Track numbering does not match the LP listing (above); it refers to CD and digital releases of the album.

- Joni Mitchell – vocals, guitar on 1, 2, 5, 6, 10; keyboards on 1, 2, 5, 6, 7, 8, 9; drum programming on 2, 7, 8; collage on 9
- Manu Katché – drums on 1, 3, 4, 5, 6, 9; percussion on 3, 4, 5, 6, 7, talking drum on 1, 7; snare drum on 2; background vocals on 5
- Steve Lindsey – organ on 2
- Larry Klein – bass; keyboards on 1, 3, 4, 8; 808 congas on 6; background vocals on 5
- Michael Landau – guitar on 3, 4, 5, 6, 8, 9; background vocals on 5
- Steve Stevens – lead guitar on 5
- Wayne Shorter – saxophones on 10
- Thomas Dolby – marimba on 5
- Peter Gabriel – guest vocalist on 1
- Benjamin Orr – background vocals on 2, 7
- Don Henley – background vocals on 3, 8
- Iron Eyes Cody – guest vocalist on 3
- Wendy Melvoin – background vocals on 4
- Lisa Coleman – background vocals on 4
- Billy Idol – guest vocalist on 5
- Tom Petty – guest vocalist on 5
- Julie Last – background vocals on 5
- Willie Nelson – guest vocalist on 6

== Charts ==
Chart performance for Chalk Mark in a Rain Storm
Chart (1988)	Peak position
Australian Albums (Australian Music Report)	44
Canada Top Albums/CDs (RPM)	23
Dutch Albums (Album Top 100)	71
European Albums (Eurotipsheet)	73
Finnish Albums (Suomen virallinen lista)	19
New Zealand Albums (RMNZ)	18
Swedish Albums (Sverigetopplistan)	37
UK Albums (Official Charts)	26
US Billboard 200	45
US Cash Box Top 100 Albums	28

== Certifications ==
Certifications for Chalk Mark in a Rain Storm
Region	Certification	Certified units/sales
Canada (Music Canada)	Gold	50,000^{^}
^{^} Shipments figures based on certification alone.
