= Dog Eat Dog (Joni Mitchell album) =

Studio album by Joni Mitchell
- Released: October 1985
- Recorded: 1984–1985
- Studio: A&M Studios (Hollywood)
- Genres: Synth-pop; experimental pop
- Length: 43:30
- Label: Geffen
- Producers: Joni Mitchell; Larry Klein; Thomas Dolby; Mike Shipley

Joni Mitchell chronology
Wild Things Run Fast (1982)	Dog Eat Dog (1985)	Chalk Mark in a Rain Storm (1988)

Singles from Dog Eat Dog
- 1. "Good Friends" Released: November 1985; 2. "Shiny Toys" Released: April 1986

Professional ratings
Review scores
Source	Rating
AllMusic	2/5 stars
Encyclopedia of Popular Music	3/5 stars
Rolling Stone	(not rated)
The Village Voice	B+

Dog Eat Dog is the twelfth studio album by the Canadian singer-songwriter Joni Mitchell, released in 1985. It was her second album for Geffen Records.

As with its predecessor Wild Things Run Fast, Dog Eat Dog moves away from Mitchell's previous folk and jazz influences in favour of 1980s studio pop. The album was a particular departure for Mitchell due to its highly synthetic sound – it was the first (and one of the few albums) on which she plays no guitar and on which she focuses entirely on keyboards (mostly synthesizers and the Fairlight CMI sampler).

Dog Eat Dog also featured an expanded role for Mitchell's bass-playing husband Larry Klein, who not only co-produced and played keyboards, but played a significant part in shaping the album's technological pop sound and also wrote the music for two of the songs. All guitars were played by session musician Michael Landau, using an electric/textural approach very different from Mitchell's own. On later albums, Mitchell gradually returned to a more organic approach similar to her mid-'70s sound.

== Recording ==
The British electronic musician Thomas Dolby co-produced Dog Eat Dog. He and Mitchell clashed in the studio, with Dolby's precise working methods proving incompatible with Mitchell's more freeform approach. Mitchell said: "He'd get excited with some idea and I couldn't get him off the keyboards. Then I'd feel bad. I'd think, oh God, I understand. He's on a creative roll. But he can't because if he does that he'll decorate me right off my own project. He may be able to do it faster. He may even be able to do it better, but the fact is it won't really be my music." Dolby wrote in his memoir that he was "probably too much of a brat, with my own blinkered way of working". On the original issue of the album, Dolby was credited as a co-producer, but on the version released as part of the 2003 Mitchell box set The Complete Geffen Recordings albums he is only credited with "sound file assistance".

Mitchell was enthusiastic about the potential of sampling and played a proactive role in incorporating it. She recorded the sound of a burglar alarm and a guy hammering, which according to her resulted in "a forboding" sound due to the resonance from the concrete. Mitchell insisted on its inclusion despite some disagreements with Klein and Dolby, who both believed that the sample was too low-fidelity. The sound effect was ultimately used on "The Three Great Stimulants" after the "deep in the night" lyric. She also based "Smokin' (Empty, Try Another)" around the sound of the cigarette machine in the parking lot of A&M. According to her notes about The Complete Geffen Recordings, the machine was played live, not sampled.

== Music ==
Dog Eat Dog was described as "synth-fueled pop" by Paste's Ellen Johnson. Reviewer William Ruhlmann wrote that Mitchell was “continuing to straddle the worlds of California folk/pop and jazz fusion". Lyrically, the album dealt with prominent issues in mid-1980s society, such as Reaganism, televangelists, consumerism and famine in Ethiopia. "Good Friends" was recorded as a duet with Michael McDonald, Rod Steiger made a voiceover appearance on "Tax Free" as a televangelist, while Thomas Dolby and Bob "Zyg" Winard added humorous character vocal interjections to "Shiny Toys". Some connections to Mitchell's past work are evident in the use of horns, and by appearances from James Taylor and saxophonist Wayne Shorter.

== Reception ==
Dog Eat Dog is generally considered one of Mitchell's weakest releases, typically being placed near or at the bottom in rankings of her discography. The Guardian ranked the album last in her catalog, stating that Mitchell is "virtually unrecognisable here" and criticizing the album's "homogenised 80s sound". Paste also ranked Dog Eat Dog as her weakest, saying that while the album "isn't unlistenable", "Joni's own hand is practically unrecognizable in the music". They also criticized Landau's playing, calling it "a copycat of the popular heartland rock artists of the day". Far Out echoed these sentiments, referring to Mitchell as a "disguised artist" on the album, which is "full of homogenised eighties sounds that can make a purist baulk".

== Release ==
"Shiny Toys" and "Good Friends" were both released as singles. A video was produced for "Good Friends" using film animation by Jim Blashfield. "Shiny Toys" was also released in a 12" extended dance single format, remix by François Kevorkian, and had a more complete lyric than the album version, featuring additional spoken character voices by Thomas Dolby ("I LOVE being out on the golf course!").

== Track listing ==
Credits taken from Mitchell's official website.

All lyrics are written by Mitchell; all music is composed by Mitchell, except "Fiction" and "Tax Free", composed by Larry Klein.

Side one
No.	Title	Length
1.	"Good Friends"	4:25
2.	"Fiction"	4:14
3.	"The Three Great Stimulants"	6:11
4.	"Tax Free"	4:19
5.	"Smokin' (Empty, Try Another)"	1:43

Side two
No.	Title	Length
1.	"Dog Eat Dog"	4:41
2.	"Shiny Toys"	3:27
3.	"Ethiopia"	5:53
4.	"Impossible Dreamer"	4:30
5.	"Lucky Girl"	4:02

== Personnel ==
- Joni Mitchell – vocals, piano, keyboards, synthesizers, sound effects, cover painting
- Larry Klein – keyboards, synthesizers, bass, programming; spoken vocals on "Fiction"
- Thomas Dolby – keyboards, synthesizers, programming; spoken vocals on "Fiction" and "Shiny Toys"
- Joe Smith – spoken vocals on "Fiction"
- Rod Steiger – spoken vocals (evangelist speech) on "Tax Free"
- Bob "Zyg" Winard – spoken vocals on "Shiny Toys"
- Michael Landau – guitar
- Steve Lukather – guitar on "Smokin' (Empty, Try Another)"
- Larry Williams – flute, tenor saxophone on "Shiny Toys"
- Kazu Matsui – shakuhachi [sic] on "Ethiopia"
- Wayne Shorter – soprano saxophone on "Impossible Dreamer", tenor saxophone on "Lucky Girl"
- Jerry Hey – trumpet, flugelhorn, horn arrangement on "Shiny Toys"
- Gary Grant – trumpet, flugelhorn on "Shiny Toys"
- Vinnie Colaiuta – drums, samples
- Alex Acuña – bata drum on "Impossible Dreamer"
- Michael Fisher – percussion samples
- Michael McDonald – vocals on "Good Friends", background vocals on "Tax Free"
- Don Henley – background vocals on "Tax Free", "Dog Eat Dog" and "Shiny Toys"
- James Taylor – background vocals on "Tax Free", "Dog Eat Dog" and "Shiny Toys"
- Amy Holland – background vocals on "Tax Free"

Technical

- Mike Shipley – engineer, mixing
- Bob "Zyg" Winard, Dan Marien – assistant engineers
- Glen Christensen – art direction

== Charts ==
Chart performance for Dog Eat Dog
Chart (1985)	Peak position
Australian Albums (Kent Music Report)	86
Canada Top Albums/CDs (RPM)	44
New Zealand Albums (RMNZ)	30
Swedish Albums (Sverigetopplistan)	27
UK Albums (Official Charts)	57
US Billboard 200	63
US Cash Box Top 100 Albums	50

== See also ==
- Ronald Reagan in music
