= Night Ride Home =

Studio album by Joni Mitchell
- Released: February 18, 1991
- Recorded: 1989–1990
- Studios: A&M (Hollywood, California); One on One (North Hollywood, California); The Kiva (Encino, California)
- Genres: Adult alternative; folk; contemporary folk
- Length: 51:43
- Label: Geffen
- Producers: Joni Mitchell, Larry Klein

Joni Mitchell chronology
Chalk Mark in a Rain Storm (1988)	Night Ride Home (1991)	Turbulent Indigo (1994)

Singles from Night Ride Home
- 1. "Night Ride Home" Released: February 1991 (UK); 2. "Come In from the Cold" Released: June 1991

Professional ratings
Review scores
Source	Rating
AllMusic	3/5 stars
The Encyclopedia of Popular Music	4/5 stars
Entertainment Weekly	5/5 stars
Los Angeles Times	4/5 stars
Rolling Stone	4/5 stars

Night Ride Home is the fourteenth album by Canadian singer-songwriter Joni Mitchell, released in the UK on February 18, 1991, and in the US on March 5, 1991. It was the last of four albums she recorded for Geffen Records.

Songs on the album include "Cherokee Louise" about a childhood friend who suffered sexual abuse, "The Windfall (Everything for Nothing)" about a maid who tried to sue Mitchell, and the retrospective single release "Come In from the Cold" about childhood and middle age. The title song "Night Ride Home" (originally titled "Fourth of July" and first performed during promotion for her previous album in 1988) was inspired by a moonlit night in Hawaii. Though the album contained no charting singles, it received critical acclaim, and the track "Come In from the Cold" received airplay on AOR stations.

This was Mitchell's first album not to be distributed by the WEA family of labels. She had been signed to WEA's Asylum and Reprise labels in the past, and Warner Bros. Records had been the distributor for Geffen Records from 1980 to 1990. That year, Geffen was sold to MCA Music (now Universal Music Group); as a result, the album was distributed by Uni Distribution Corp. (the distribution arm of MCA Music), which also took over the rest of the Geffen catalogue.

A home video release, Come In from the Cold, was released the same year and features promo videos for five tracks from the album along with an interview with Mitchell discussing the inspiration behind them.

As of December 2007, the album had sold 238,000 copies in the US.

== Track listing ==
All music written by Joni Mitchell except "Nothing Can Be Done" by Larry Klein; all lyrics written by Mitchell except "Slouching Towards Bethlehem", based on "The Second Coming" by W. B. Yeats.

1. "Night Ride Home" – 3:22
2. "Passion Play (When All the Slaves Are Free)" – 5:25
3. "Cherokee Louise" – 4:32
4. "The Windfall (Everything for Nothing)" – 5:16
5. "Slouching Towards Bethlehem" (based on a poem by W.B. Yeats) – 6:55
6. "Come In from the Cold" – 7:31
7. "Nothing Can Be Done" – 4:54
8. "The Only Joy in Town" – 5:12
9. "Ray's Dad's Cadillac" – 4:33
10. "Two Grey Rooms" – 3:58

== Personnel ==
- Joni Mitchell – vocals, guitar, keyboards, percussion, Birotron on 6, oboe on 8, Omnichord on 8
- Wayne Shorter – soprano saxophone on 3, 9
- Bill Dillon – guitar on 2, 7; pedal steel guitar on 1
- Michael Landau – guitar on 10
- Larry Klein – bass; percussion on 1, 2, 3, 5, 6; guitar on 6; keyboards on 7
- Vinnie Colaiuta – drums on 4, 5, 6, 7, 10; snare drum on 3
- Alex Acuña – percussion on 1, 2, 5, 6, 7, 8
- Karen Peris – backing vocals on 3
- Brenda Russell – backing vocals on 9
- David Baerwald – backing vocals on 7
- Jeremy Lubbock – conductor, arranger, string arrangement on 10

== Charts ==
Chart performance for Night Ride Home
Chart (1991)	Peak position
Australian Albums (Kent Music Report)	55
Canada Top Albums/CDs (RPM)	30
Dutch Albums (Album Top 100)	75
New Zealand Albums (RMNZ)	40
Swedish Albums (Sverigetopplistan)	43
UK Albums (Official Charts)	25
US Billboard 200	41
US Cash Box Top 100 Albums	29
European Albums (Eurotipsheet)	69
