= Tracy Chapman discography =

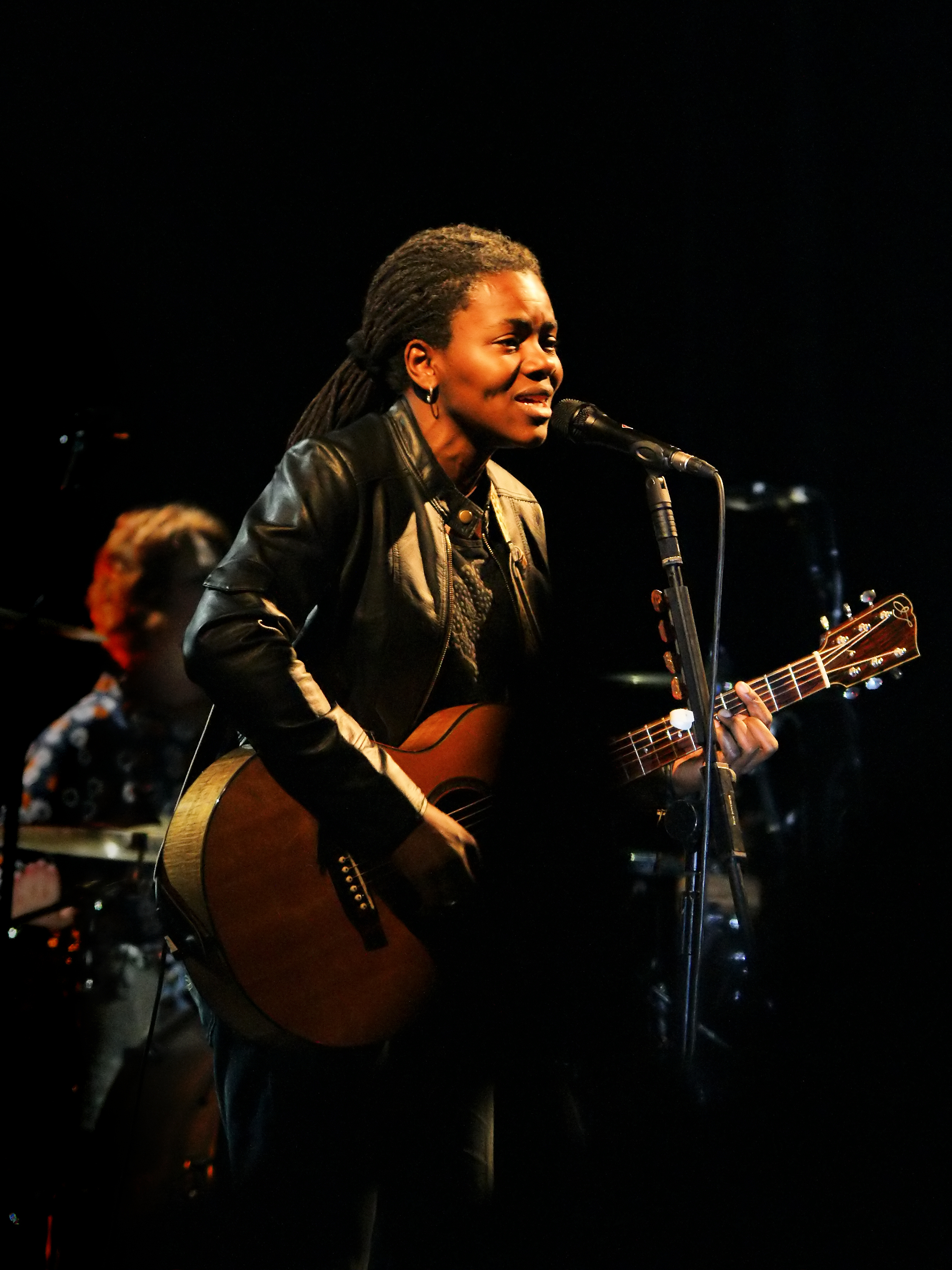
- Chapman performing in 2009
- Studio albums: 8
- Compilation albums: 2
- Singles: 22

The discography of Tracy Chapman, an American singer-songwriter, consists of eight studio albums, two compilation albums, and 22 singles on Elektra Records. In the United States, Chapman has four Platinum albums, two of which are multi-platinum, and two Gold albums. All of her studio albums have charted on the U.S. Billboard 200, with five charting in the Top 40, and three in the Top 10. Five of Chapman's singles have charted on both the Billboard Hot 100 and Billboard Adult Contemporary chart, with "Fast Car" and "Give Me One Reason" reaching the Top 10 on both charts. The latter was also certified Gold by the Recording Industry Association of America (RIAA). Both singles also hit No. 1 in Canada.

Chapman released her self-titled debut album in 1988 and it became a worldwide commercial success. The album went to No. 1 on the Billboard 200 and received six Grammy Award nominations, including Album of the Year and Best Contemporary Folk Album, which she won. She also won Best New Artist and Best Female Pop Vocal Performance for her single "Fast Car". Crossroads appeared the following year and earned Chapman an additional Grammy nomination for Best Contemporary Folk Album, while it went to No. 9 on the Billboard 200. Her third album, Matters of the Heart, followed in 1992. Chapman's fourth album, New Beginning, was released in 1995 and became another worldwide success. It was certified 5× platinum by the RIAA and earned Chapman five Grammy nominations. It also yielded the hit single "Give Me One Reason", which earned Chapman the Grammy Award for Best Rock Song. Five years would pass before the release of her fifth album, Telling Stories (2000). Let It Rain and Where You Live followed in 2002 and 2005, respectively. Chapman's most recent studio album is Our Bright Future, released in 2008. It earned her another Grammy nomination for Best Contemporary Folk Album.

== Albums ==
=== Studio albums ===
Title	Details	Peak chart positions										Certifications (sales threshold)
Title	Details	US	AUS	AUT	CAN	GER	NED	NZ	SWE	SWI	UK	Certifications (sales threshold)
Tracy Chapman	Released: April 5, 1988; Label: Elektra; Format: LP, CD	1	2	1	1	1	1	1	2	1	1	RIAA: 6× Platinum; ARIA: 7× Platinum; BPI: 9× Platinum; BVMI: 9× Gold; GLF: Gold; IFPI AUT: 2× Platinum; IFPI SWI: 4× Platinum; MC: 3× Platinum; NVPI: Platinum; RMNZ: 2× Platinum
Crossroads	Released: October 3, 1989; Label: Elektra; Format: LP, CD	9	4	3	12	1	5	1	8	2	1	RIAA: Platinum; ARIA: 2× Platinum; BPI: Platinum; BVMI: 2× Platinum; GLF: Gold; IFPI AUT: Platinum; IFPI SWI: 2× Platinum; MC: Platinum; NVPI: Gold; RMNZ: Platinum
Matters of the Heart	Released: April 28, 1992; Label: Elektra; Format: CD	53	23	11	55	13	33	23	37	10	19	RIAA: Gold; ARIA: Gold; IFPI SWI: Gold
New Beginning	Released: November 14, 1995; Label: Elektra; Format: CD	4	6	9	1	60	—	8	46	22	—	RIAA: 5× Platinum; ARIA: 3× Platinum; BPI: Silver; BVMI: Gold; IFPI AUT: Gold; MC: 7× Platinum; RMNZ: Platinum
Telling Stories	Released: February 15, 2000; Label: Elektra; Format: CD	33	33	5	15	5	—	10	16	2	85	RIAA: Gold; BVMI: Gold; IFPI SWI: Gold; RMNZ: Gold
Let It Rain	Released: October 15, 2002; Label: Elektra; Format: CD	25	25	6	—	15	75	45	27	4	36	BPI: Silver; IFPI AUT: Gold; IFPI SWI: Gold
Where You Live	Released: September 13, 2005; Label: Elektra, Atlantic; Format: CD, digital download	49	77	7	—	12	38	—	28	4	43	IFPI SWI: Gold
Our Bright Future	Released: November 11, 2008; Label: Elektra, Atlantic; Format: CD, digital download	57	81	23	—	28	56	—	35	9	75	IFPI SWI: Gold
"—" denotes a recording that did not chart or was not released in that territory.

=== Compilation albums ===
Title	Details	Peak chart positions											Certifications (sales threshold)
Title	Details	US	AUS	AUT	BEL	NED	NZ	NOR	POR	SWE	SWI	UK	Certifications (sales threshold)
Collection	Released: October 30, 2001; Label: Elektra, WEA International; Format: CD	—	10	1	6	3	9	6	24	9	4	3	ARIA: 3× Platinum; BPI: Platinum; BVMI: Gold; GLF: Gold; IFPI AUT: Gold; IFPI SWI: Gold; NVPI: Platinum; RMNZ: Platinum
Greatest Hits	Released: November 20, 2015; Label: Elektra; Format: CD, digital download	105	14	—	51	79	3	—	—	—	64	30	BPI: Gold
"—" denotes a recording that did not chart or was not released in that territory.

== Singles ==
=== As lead artist ===
Year	Title	Peak chart positions										Certifications	Album
Year	Title	US	US Main. Rock	US Mod. Rock	US AC	US R&B	AUS	CAN	NZ	SWI	UK	Certifications	Album
1988	"Fast Car"	6	19	—	7	—	4	1	21	—	4	BPI: 5× Platinum; MC: 8× Platinum; RMNZ: 8× Platinum	Tracy Chapman
1988	"Talkin' 'bout a Revolution"	75	22	24	45	78	66	42	32	—	85	BPI: Gold; RMNZ: Platinum	Tracy Chapman
1988	"Baby Can I Hold You"	48	—	—	19	—	68	27	16	—	94	BPI: Platinum; RMNZ: 2× Platinum	Tracy Chapman
1989	"Crossroads"	90	26	7	41	—	58	32	21	18	61		Crossroads
1989	"All That You Have Is Your Soul"	—	—	—	—	—	119	—	—	—	—		Crossroads
1990	"Subcity"	—	—	—	—	—	—	—	—	—	—		Crossroads
1992	"Bang Bang Bang"	—	—	—	—	—	84	—	—	—	—		Matters of the Heart
1992	"Dreaming on a World"	—	—	—	—	—	—	—	—	—	—		Matters of the Heart
1995	"Give Me One Reason"	3	—	—	3	35	3	1	16	—	95	RIAA: Platinum; ARIA: Platinum; BPI: Silver; RMNZ: 4× Platinum	New Beginning
1996	"New Beginning"	— (Note: "New Beginning" did not enter the Billboard Hot 100, but peaked at number six on the Bubbling Under Hot 100 chart.)	—	—	—	—	114	—	—	—	—		New Beginning
1996	"The Promise"	—	—	—	—	—	—	—	—	—	—		New Beginning
1996	"Smoke and Ashes"	— (Note: "Smoke and Ashes" did not enter the Billboard Hot 100, but peaked at number 19 on the Bubbling Under Hot 100 chart.)	—	—	—	—	57	—	—	—	—		New Beginning
2000	"Telling Stories"	— (Note: "Telling Stories" did not enter the Billboard Hot 100, but peaked at number eight on the Bubbling Under Hot 100 chart.)	—	—	—	—	180	—	22	76	—		Telling Stories
2000	"It's OK"	—	—	—	—	—	—	—	—	—	—		Telling Stories
2000	"Wedding Song"	—	—	—	—	—	—	—	—	—	—		Telling Stories
2001	"Baby Can I Hold You" (re-release)	—	—	—	—	—	—	—	—	—	—		The Collection
2002	"You're the One"	—	—	—	—	—	—	—	—	—	146		Let It Rain
2003	"Another Sun"	—	—	—	—	—	—	—	—	—	—		Let It Rain
2005	"Change"	—	—	—	—	—	—	—	—	—	191		Where You Live
2006	"America"	—	—	—	—	—	—	—	—	—	—		Where You Live
2008	"Sing for You"	—	—	—	—	—	83	—	—	48	—		Our Bright Future
2009	"Thinking of You"	—	—	—	—	—	—	—	—	—	—		Our Bright Future
"—" denotes a recording that did not chart or was not released in that territory.

=== Contributions ===
Duet songs:

- 1997: "The Thrill Is Gone" with B.B. King from his album Deuces Wild
- 1999: "Give Me One Reason" with Eric Clapton from the album A Very Special Christmas Live
- 1999: "Trench Town Rock" with Stephen and Ziggy Marley at the One Love The Bob Marley All-Star Tribute
- 2000: "Baby Can I Hold You" with Luciano Pavarotti from the DVD/Album Pavarotti and Friends for Cambodia and Tibet
- 2001: "The Maker" with Dave Matthews on October 21, 2001, at the Bridge School Benefit
- 2005: "Ain't No Sunshine" with Buddy Guy from his album Bring 'Em In

Covered songs:

- 1990: "The House of the Rising Sun" – Rubáiyát (LP)
- 1993: "The Times They Are A Changin" – Bob Dylan 30th Anniversary Celebration (LP)
- 1997 and 1999: "O Holy Night" – A Very Special Christmas 3 (LP) and A Very Special Christmas Live (LP)
- 2000: "Three Little Birds" – Live at the One Love The Bob Marley All-Star Tribute
- 2003: "Get Up Stand Up" – by Bob Marley featured on the Let It Rain tour edition (CD2 & LP)
- 2005: "Stand By Me" – by Ben E. King on the XM Hear Music Radio Sessions Volume 1 (LP)

== Music videos ==
Year	Title	Ref.
1988	"Fast Car"	
1988	"Talkin' 'bout a Revolution"	
1988	"Baby Can I Hold You"	
1989	"Crossroads"	
1989	"Born to Fight"	
1992	"Bang Bang Bang"	
1995	"Give Me One Reason"	
1996	"New Beginning"	
1997	"The Thrill Is Gone" (B.B. King featuring Tracy Chapman)	
2000	"Telling Stories"	
2005	"Change"	
2008	"Sing for You"	
