= Greatest Hits (Tracy Chapman album) =

2015 compilation

Greatest hits album by Tracy Chapman
- Released: November 20, 2015
- Recorded: 1988–2008
- Studio: Various
- Genre: Contemporary folk, folk rock
- Length: 77:28
- Label: Elektra; Rhino
- Producer: Tchad Blake; Tracy Chapman; Don Gehman; Jimmy Iovine; David Kershenbaum; Larry Klein; John Parish
- Compiler: Tracy Chapman

Tracy Chapman chronology
Our Bright Future (2008)	Greatest Hits (2015)

Greatest Hits is a greatest hits album by American singer-songwriter Tracy Chapman, released on November 20, 2015, by Elektra and Rhino.

It is the second compilation of her career, following Collection from 2001, and the first available in the United States. All tracks were chosen by Chapman herself. The collection received positive reviews.

== Reception ==
Professional ratings
Review scores
Source	Rating
AllMusic	4/5 stars
American Songwriter	4/5 stars
PopMatters	7/10 stars

James Christopher Monger of AllMusic gave the album four out of five stars, calling it "a nice mix of hits and deep cuts". He also singled out Chapman's "emotionally pitch-perfect, spotlight-stealing rendition" of "Stand by Me": "Performed live on the Late Show with David Letterman in the waning days of the program's final season. With just her voice and an electric guitar, she managed to simultaneously bring the house down and build it back up again, which is no small feat, even for an artist who has proven herself time and again to be a powerful yet always benevolent force of nature."

In American Songwriter, Hal Horowitz awarded the same score, praising her songwriting and performance but noting, "If there is a downside to Chapman’s music, it’s production that is so consistently clean, if not quite slick, most of the edges are sanded off. It makes this collection flow smoothly, perhaps too much so since a rawer approach would help some of the material connect with more immediacy. Still, for those unfamiliar with her career, this is a top notch, well-chosen summation of Chapman’s classy, emotionally moving catalog." In PopMatters, Chris Gerard's review was seven out of 10 stars, using the opportunity to cover the artist's career and summing up, "This collection is an excellent starting point to discovering that she’s put out a ton of great work."

== Track listing ==
All songs written by Tracy Chapman, except where noted.

1. "Telling Stories" (from Telling Stories, 2000) – 3:57
2. "Baby Can I Hold You" (from Tracy Chapman, 1988) – 3:12
3. "Change" (from Where You Live, 2005) – 5:05
4. "The Promise" (from New Beginning, 1995) – 5:25
5. "Open Arms" (from Matters of the Heart, 1992) – 4:34
6. "Subcity" (from Crossroads, 1989) – 5:10
7. "Fast Car" (from Tracy Chapman, 1988) – 4:57
8. "Bang Bang Bang (Song for Little Man)" (from Matters of the Heart, 1992) – 4:22
9. "Crossroads" (from Crossroads, 1989) – 4:12
10. "Speak the Word" (from Telling Stories, 2000) – 4:11
11. "Smoke and Ashes" (from New Beginning, 1995) – 6:39
12. "Sing for You" (Single Edit, original version from Our Bright Future, 2008) – 3:43
13. "You're the One" (from Let It Rain, 2002) – 3:05
14. "Save Us All" (from Our Bright Future, 2008) – 3:45
15. "All That You Have Is Your Soul" (from Crossroads, 1989) – 5:14
16. "Talkin' 'Bout a Revolution" (from Tracy Chapman, 1988) – 2:39
17. "Give Me One Reason" (from New Beginning, 1995) – 4:29
18. "Stand by Me" (previously unreleased, recorded live at the Late Show with David Letterman, April 16, 2015) (Ben E. King, Jerry Leiber, and Mike Stoller) – 2:49

== Charts ==
2015 chart performance for Greatest Hits
Chart	Peak
Australian Albums (ARIA)	14
Belgian Albums (Ultratop Wallonia)	51
Dutch Albums (Album Top 100)	79
New Zealand Albums (RMNZ)	3
Swiss Albums (Schweizer Hitparade)	64
UK Albums (OCC)	30
US Billboard 200	105

== Certifications ==
Certifications for Greatest Hits
Region	Certification	Certified units/sales
United Kingdom (BPI)	Gold	100,000^{‡}
^{‡} Sales+streaming figures based on certification alone.
