= Collection (Tracy Chapman album) =

Greatest hits album by Tracy Chapman
- Released: October 30, 2001
- Genre: Folk rock, alternative rock, blues rock
- Length: 72:53
- Label: Elektra, WEA International

Tracy Chapman chronology
| Telling Stories (2000) | Collection (2001) | Let It Rain (2002) |

Professional ratings
Review scores
| Source | Rating |
|---|---|
| AllMusic | 4.5/5 stars |

Collection is a greatest hits album by American singer-songwriter Tracy Chapman, released on October 30, 2001, by Elektra Records and WEA International.

The album features tracks from Chapman's first five studio albums, including her two U.S. Top 10 hits "Fast Car" and "Give Me One Reason". Other charted singles on this album include "Talkin' 'bout a Revolution", "Baby Can I Hold You", and "Crossroads". It is the first compilation of her career, and the collection received positive reviews. It was followed by the remastered Greatest Hits in 2015 (which was curated by Chapman herself).

== Track listing ==
1. "Fast Car" – (Tracy Chapman, 1988) 4:58
2. "Subcity" – (Crossroads, 1989) 5:12
3. "Baby Can I Hold You" – (Tracy Chapman, 1988) 3:14
4. "The Promise" – (New Beginning, 1995) 5:28
5. "I'm Ready" – (New Beginning, 1995) 4:56
6. "Crossroads" – (Crossroads, 1989) 4:13
7. "Bang Bang Bang" – (Matters of the Heart, 1992) 4:22
8. "Telling Stories" – (Telling Stories, 2000) 3:58
9. "Smoke and Ashes" – (New Beginning, 1995) 6:39
10. "Speak the Word" – (Telling Stories, 2000) 4:13
11. "Wedding Song" – (Telling Stories, 2000) 4:36
12. "Open Arms" – (Matters of the Heart, 1992) 4:34
13. "Give Me One Reason" – (New Beginning, 1995) 4:29
14. "Talkin' 'bout a Revolution" – (Tracy Chapman, 1988) 2:40
15. "She's Got Her Ticket" – (Tracy Chapman, 1988) 3:56
16. "All That You Have Is Your Soul" – (Crossroads, 1989) 5:15

== Charts ==
=== Weekly charts ===
| Chart (2001–2002) | Peak position |
|---|---|
| Australian Albums (ARIA) | 10 |
| Austrian Albums (Ö3 Austria) | 1 |
| Belgian Albums (Ultratop Flanders) | 14 |
| Belgian Albums (Ultratop Wallonia) | 6 |
| Danish Albums (Hitlisten) | 3 |
| Dutch Albums (Album Top 100) | 24 |
| German Albums (Offizielle Top 100) | 3 |
| Irish Albums (IRMA) | 3 |
| Italian Albums (FIMI) | 6 |
| New Zealand Albums (RMNZ) | 9 |
| Norwegian Albums (VG-lista) | 3 |
| Scottish Albums (OCC) | 4 |
| Swedish Albums (Sverigetopplistan) | 2 |
| Swiss Albums (Schweizer Hitparade) | 4 |
| UK Albums (OCC) | 3 |

| Chart (2006–2007) | Peak position |
|---|---|
| Portuguese Albums (AFP) | 27 |
| Spanish Albums (PROMUSICAE) | 100 |

=== Year-end charts ===
| Chart (2001) | Position |
|---|---|
| Australian Albums (ARIA) | 61 |
| Austrian Albums (Ö3 Austria) | 17 |
| German Albums (Offizielle Top 100) | 59 |
| Swedish Albums (Sverigetopplistan) | 75 |
| Swiss Albums (Schweizer Hitparade) | 41 |
| UK Albums (OCC) | 60 |
| Chart (2002) | Position |
| Australian Albums (ARIA) | 100 |
| Belgian Albums (Ultratop Wallonia) | 76 |

== Certifications ==
| Region | Certification | Certified units/sales |
|---|---|---|
| Argentina (CAPIF) | Gold | 20,000^{^} |
| Australia (ARIA) | 3× Platinum | 210,000^{^} |
| Austria (IFPI Austria) | Gold | 20,000^{*} |
| France (SNEP) | Platinum | 300,000^{*} |
| Germany (BVMI) | Gold | 150,000^{^} |
| Netherlands (NVPI) | Platinum | 80,000^{^} |
| New Zealand (RMNZ) | Platinum | 15,000^{^} |
| Portugal (AFP) | Gold | 20,000^{^} |
| Spain (PROMUSICAE) | Gold | 50,000^{^} |
| Sweden (GLF) | Gold | 40,000^{^} |
| Switzerland (IFPI Switzerland) | Gold | 20,000^{^} |
| United Kingdom (BPI) | Platinum | 300,000^{^} |
Summaries
| Europe (IFPI) | Platinum | 1,000,000^{*} |
^{*} Sales figures based on certification alone.^{^} Shipments figures based on certification alone.
