= WMFO =

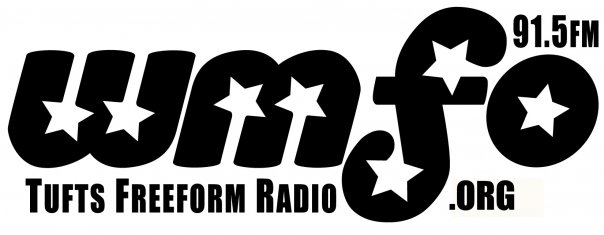

Medford, Massachusetts; United States
- Frequency: 91.5 MHz
- Branding: WMFO 91.5 FM

Programming
- Format: Freeform

Ownership
- Owner: Tufts University

History
- Founded: 1957 as carrier-current station "WTUR"
- First air date: February 1971
- Call sign meaning: Medford

Technical information
- Licensing authority: FCC
- Facility ID: 68320
- Class: A
- ERP: 125 watts
- HAAT: 41 meters (135 ft)
- Transmitter coordinates: 42°24′27.3″N 71°7′13.1″W

Links
- Public license information: Public file; LMS
- Webcast: Listen live
- Website: wmfo.org

WMFO (91.5 FM) is a freeform radio station licensed to Medford, Massachusetts, United States. The station is owned by Tufts University and is run by students and community members. WMFO is funded by the Tufts Student Activities Fee as allocated by the TCU Senate and through community donations.

WMFO occupies the entire third floor of Curtis Hall on the campus of Tufts University. Studio A houses the main broadcast studio. Studio Dee, named for late Boston music writer and WMFO DJ Mikey Dee, is used for live performances that undergo professional mixing, recording and effects processing in the adjacent Studio B. Studio C is a secondary broadcast and production studio. An extensive collection of vinyl records is housed throughout the station. Much of WMFO's vinyl collection was destroyed during the 1977 fire, but appeals to the Tufts community and local residents resulted in donations that replaced some of the lost albums.

WMFO is a freeform station that imposes no content restrictions on its air staff, apart from FCC requirements for content, station identification and public service announcements. Musical programming ranges from rock and roll; rock and all its subgenres including hard rock, punk, glam, garage, indie, goth, rock-a-billy, psycho-billy, metal; contemporary Jewish music; blues; reggae; folk; easy-listening; hip-hop; dance; jazz; & classical. Spoken word programming includes humorous shows, political talk, sports talk, and community issues.

As a condition of the station's FCC license, a portion of the weekly program schedule must be allotted to volunteer DJs from the local community. There are no financial requirements for community members, but they share the same on- and off-air responsibilities as student DJs and must volunteer additional hours each year for station maintenance and upkeep to remain in good standing with the station.

The transmitter is atop Ballou Hall, is directional to the east, and broadcasts with an effective radiated power of 125 watts. WMFO streams worldwide from wmfo.org as well as broadcast locally on FM radio on 91.5 MHz.

== History ==
=== WTCR ===
Prior to the licensing of WMFO, the station was home to the unlicensed AM radio station WTCR (Tufts College Radio.) In 1957, Tufts University students used WTCR's war surplus 20-watt transmitter (Tuned to 560 kHz on the AM dial) from the third floor of Curtis Hall, adjacent to the B&M Railroad line. Legend has it that in Powderhouse Square, you could get WTCR on your toaster; that in close proximity to Curtis Hall, you could receive nothing BUT WTCR on a car radio, and that the signal "skipped" to B&M telegraph lines running along the tracks and carried the signal as far north as Quebec. This stunt drew the attention of the Federal Communications Commission (FCC), which promptly shut the station down and forbade Tufts from having a station for 10 years. Less reliable is the legend that the chief engineer actually spent a night in jail.

=== WTUR ===
In the Fall of 1967, several students got together and created a closed circuit station under the call letters WTUR (Tufts U. Radio). The signal was spotty at best and often carried static, but Tufts had a radio station again. Among the founders were Tommy Hadges (later of WBCN, WCOZ and consultancy fame), J.J. Jackson (one of the first generation MTV video jocks) and Sam Kopper (later of WBCN and Starfleet Remote Studios.) Later that school year, work began, led by R.J. Trodella, to get Tufts a licensed FM station.

=== The move to FM ===
On August 10, 1970, an application for a construction permit was filed with the FCC, which issued a construction permit on October 23, 1970. WMFO went on the air in early February 1971 at 10 watts, and was first licensed March 5, 1971. The callsign WMFO was assigned by the FCC on December 23, 1970; which denied call letters WTUR, WTCR and WWFM. On April 18, 1980, WMFO applied to increase its effective radiated power to 125 watts, which was approved by the FCC on December 23, 1981.

On April 2, 1977, Curtis Hall, the building that WMFO resides in, had a major fire. The station was knocked off the air for a short time, but was up and running within a few hours when student DJs plugged a portable broadcasting board directly into the station's transmitter. Prior to this fire, WMFO was said to have the second most comprehensive rock vinyl collection in greater Boston, with only WBCN having a larger one. While she was studying at Tufts University, singer-songwriter Tracy Chapman recorded demos of songs on the station for copyright purposes, in exchange for the station's right to play her songs; fellow Tufts student Brian Koppelman showed his father Charles Koppelman, who ran SBK Publishing, a tape he had smuggled from the station of Chapman's song "Talkin' 'bout a Revolution", leading Chapman to sign with the record company and record her self-titled debut album containing that song.

In March 2009, the station left the airwaves for a week, replacing its aging analog equipment with an all-digital system including a Rivendell Radio Automation server that houses much of the station's rock and pop music collections in a lossless format.

== See also ==
- Campus radio
- List of college radio stations in the United States
