= Telling Stories (album) =

Studio album by Tracy Chapman
- Released: February 14, 2000
- Recorded: 1999
- Genre: Adult contemporary; folk; rock
- Length: 42:09
- Label: Elektra
- Producer: Tracy Chapman; David Kershenbaum

Tracy Chapman chronology
New Beginning (1995)	Telling Stories (2000)	Collection (2001)

Singles from Telling Stories
- 1. "Telling Stories" Released: December 22, 1999; 2. "It's OK" Released: 2000; 3. "Wedding Song" Released: 2000

Professional ratings
Review scores
Source	Rating
AllMusic	3/5 stars
Christgau’s Consumer Guide	(dud)
Now	2/5 stars
Q	2/5 stars
Rolling Stone	3/5 stars
The Rolling Stone Album Guide	3.5/5 stars

Telling Stories is the fifth album by American singer-songwriter Tracy Chapman, released on February 14, 2000, by Elektra Records.

A two-disc special edition was released in Europe in 2000. The album is composed of contemporary rock songs in the first half, and folk songs in the second half.

The record marked a return to shorter songs for Chapman; on New Beginning they had been somewhat longer.

== Background and writing ==
In 1999, Chapman began working on her first new record in four years, her longest ever hiatus at the time. For the record, she reunited with producer David Kershenbaum, the producer of her first album, Tracy Chapman (1988), and co-producer of her second album, Crossroads (1989). The song "Unsung Psalm" was originally written for her previous album, New Beginning (1995), but it didn't make it onto the album.

== Track listing ==
All songs written by Tracy Chapman.

No.	Title	Length
1.	"Telling Stories"	3:57
2.	"Less Than Strangers"	3:19
3.	"Speak the Word"	4:12
4.	"It's OK"	4:00
5.	"Wedding Song"	4:36
6.	"Unsung Psalm"	4:19
7.	"Nothing Yet"	3:21
8.	"Paper and Ink"	4:52
9.	"Devotion"	2:48
10.	"The Only One"	3:08
11.	"First Try"	3:31

Tour Edition Bonus CD
No.	Title	Length
1.	"Three Little Birds" (Live)	3:27
2.	"House of the Rising Sun" (Live)	2:02
3.	"Mountains O' Things" (Live)	5:06
4.	"Behind the Wall" (Live)	2:09
5.	"Baby Can I Hold You"	3:13

=== Cover versions ===
- "Three Little Birds" is a Bob Marley cover. The song was originally released on the album Exodus in 1977.
- "House of the Rising Sun" is a cover of a traditional folk song. It was firstly released by Ashley and Foster on the single Rising Sun Blues under the same title in 1933.

=== Trivia ===
- "Three Little Birds" was recorded at the TNT concert and television special One Love: An All Star Tribute to Bob Marley in Oracabessa on December 4, 1999.
- "House of the Rising Sun" was recorded at the Greek Theatre, Berkeley and the A&M Studios in Los Angeles in 1990. It seems, that it is actually more a live in the studio recording than a real live recording because you don't hear any crowd noise.
- "Mountains o' Things" was recorded at the Montreux Jazz Festival on July 4, 1988.
- "Behind the Wall" was recorded at The Donmar Warehouse in London on March 25, 1988.
- "Baby Can I Hold You" is the same version as the one that was originally released on the album Tracy Chapman in 1988.

== Personnel ==
=== Musicians ===
- Tracy Chapman – acoustic guitar, bouzouki, harp, vocals, background vocals, baritone guitar, record producer, mixing, art design
- Alex Acuña – percussion
- Rock Deadrick – vocals, background vocals
- Tommy Eyre – organ, keyboard
- Mike Finnigan – organ
- Denny Fongheiser – percussion, drums
- Emmylou Harris – vocals
- Howard Hersh – bass guitar
- Steve Hunter – dulcimer, lap steel guitar, baritone guitar
- Larry Klein – bass guitar
- JayDee Mannes – pedal steel guitar
- John Pierce – bass guitar
- Tim Pierce – acoustic guitar, dobro, mandolin, sitar, baritone guitar
- Eric Rigler – Uilleann pipes, low whistle
- Scarlet Rivera – violin
- Glenys Rogers – percussion, vocals, background vocals
- Andy Stoller – bass guitar
- Patrick Warren – keyboard, Chamberlin

=== Technical personnel ===
- Duane Baron – engineering, mixing
- Tim Hailand – artwork
- Jeri Heiden – design
- John Heiden – design
- Renata Kanclerz – production coordination
- David Kershenbaum – mixing, production
- Martie Kolbl – production coordination
- Curt Kroeger – assistant engineering
- Iki Levy – drum programming
- Bob Ludwig – mastering
- Herb Ritts – portraits
- Roger Sommers – assistant engineering

== Charts ==
=== Weekly charts ===
Chart (2000)	Peak position
Australian Albums (ARIA)	33
Austrian Albums (Ö3 Austria)	5
French Albums (SNEP)	9
German Albums (Offizielle Top 100)	5
Irish Albums (IRMA)	15
Italian Albums (FIMI)	14
New Zealand Albums (RMNZ)	10
Norwegian Albums (VG-lista)	17
Swedish Albums (Sverigetopplistan)	16
Swiss Albums (Schweizer Hitparade)	2
UK Albums (Official Charts)	85
US Billboard 200	33

=== Year-end charts ===
Chart (2000)	Position
Austrian Albums (Ö3 Austria)	35
French Albums (SNEP)	37
German Albums (Offizielle Top 100)	75
Swiss Albums (Schweizer Hitparade)	26

=== Singles ===
Billboard (United States)

Single	Chart	Position
"Telling Stories"	Adult Top 40	8
"Telling Stories"	Bubbling Under Hot 100 Singles	8
"Telling Stories"	Triple-A	1

== Certifications ==
Region	Certification	Certified units/sales
France (SNEP)	2× Gold	200,000^{*}
Germany (BVMI)	Gold	150,000^{^}
Italy (FIMI)	Gold	50,000^{*}
New Zealand (RMNZ)	Gold	7,500^{^}
Switzerland (IFPI Switzerland)	Gold	25,000^{^}
United States (RIAA)	Gold	500,000^{^}
^{*} Sales figures based on certification alone.^{^} Shipments figures based on certification alone.
