= Crossroads (Tracy Chapman song) =

Single by Tracy Chapman

from the album Crossroads
- B-side: "Born to Fight"
- Released: 18 September 1989 (UK)
- Studio: Powertrax Studios (Hollywood, CA)
- Genre: Folk rock; worldbeat
- Length: 4:11
- Label: Elektra
- Songwriter: Tracy Chapman
- Producers: David Kershenbaum; Tracy Chapman

Tracy Chapman singles chronology
"Baby Can I Hold You" (1988)	"Crossroads" (1989)	"All That You Have Is Your Soul" (1989)

"Crossroads" is a song by American singer Tracy Chapman. It was released in 1989 as the lead single from her second studio album Crossroads. The song was written by Chapman, and produced by David Kershenbaum and Chapman. "Crossroads" reached No. 90 on the Billboard Hot 100. The song's music video was directed by Matt Mahurin.

== Reception ==
On its release as a single, Tim Southwell of Record Mirror wrote, "'Crossroads' sees Tracy in familiar sombre mood, reflecting on life's struggles and the pain of it all. It may not be frothy but Chapman's cool vibes are always welcome." Sian Pattenden of Smash Hits described the song as "very much the kind of folksy, sombre song you'd expect from Tracy". She added, "If you liked "Fast Car" then you'll like this because it's jolly similar."

In a review of Crossroads, Fred Goodman of Rolling Stone noted the song's "rich arrangement and heartfelt delivery" and added, "'Crossroads' breaks little new ground for Chapman musically, but its subtly shaded percussion, pizzicato violin and lilting accordion give new muscle to Chapman's previously bareboned presentation." Steve Morse of The Boston Globe felt the song "opens the album in a startling confessional manner".

Parry Gettelman of the Orlando Sentinel considered the song to "proclaim [Chapman's] independence from materialism and money-changers who beset her." Brian Springer of The Daily Tar Heel wrote, "The title track adds the only new lyrical wrinkle [on the album], with Chapman making the usual star complaint of having to deal with all the attention. Accordion and violin pizzicato give this song a slightly different flavor than the previous album."

== Track listing ==
7" single

1. "Crossroads" - 4:11
2. "Born to Fight" - 2:46

12" single

1. "Crossroads" - 4:11
2. "Born to Fight" - 2:46
3. "Mountains O'Things" (Live) - 5:05

12" single (UK release)

1. "Crossroads" - 4:11
2. "Born to Fight" - 2:46
3. "Fast Car" - 4:57

Cassette single

1. "Crossroads" - 4:11
2. "Born to Fight" - 2:46

CD single (German release)

1. "Crossroads" - 4:11
2. "Born to Fight" - 2:46
3. "Mountains O'Things" (Live) - 5:05

CD single (US promo)

1. "Crossroads" - 4:11

== Personnel ==
Crossroads

- Tracy Chapman - vocals, acoustic guitar
- G. E. Smith - acoustic picking guitar
- Frank Marocco - accordion
- Charlie Bisharat - violin
- Bob Marlette - keyboards
- Larry Klein - bass
- Denny Fongheiser - drums
- Bobbye Hall - percussion

Born to Fight

- Tracy Chapman - vocals, acoustic guitar
- Jack Holder - acoustic piano
- Snooky Young - trumpet
- Tim Landers - bass
- Denny Fongheiser - drums
- Bobbye Hall - tambourine

Production

- David Kershenbaum, Tracy Chapman - producers
- Kevin W. Smith - engineer, mixing
- John X Volaitis - additional engineer
- Marty Lester - assistant engineer, assistant mixer
- Bob Ludwig - mastering
- Claude Nobs - producer on "Mountains O'Things"
- David Richards - engineer on "Mountains O'Things"

== Charts ==
Chart (1989)	Peak position
Australian Singles Chart	58
Austrian Singles Chart	21
Belgian Singles Chart (Ultratop 50 Flanders)	37
Canada (RPM 100)	32
Dutch Singles Chart	15
German Singles Chart	38
Irish Singles Chart	11
Italian Singles Chart (FIMI)	16
Italy Airplay (Music & Media)	4
New Zealand Singles Chart	21
Swiss Singles Chart	18
UK Singles Chart (Official Charts Company)	61
US Billboard Adult Contemporary	41
US Billboard Album Rock Tracks	26
US Billboard Hot 100	90
US Billboard Modern Rock Tracks	7
