= Give Me One Reason =

1995 single by Tracy Chapman

Single by Tracy Chapman

from the album New Beginning
- B-side: "The Rape of the World"
- Released: November 20, 1995
- Genre: Blues rock
- Length: 4:30
- Label: Elektra
- Songwriter: Tracy Chapman
- Producers: Don Gehman; Tracy Chapman

Tracy Chapman singles chronology
"Dreaming on a World" (1992)	"Give Me One Reason" (1995)	"New Beginning" (1996)

Audio sample
- "Give Me One Reason": file; help

"Give Me One Reason" is a song written and performed by American singer-songwriter Tracy Chapman. It was included on her fourth studio album, New Beginning (1995), and was released as a single in various territories between November 1995 and March 1997, her first since 1992's "Dreaming on a World". The song is Chapman's biggest US hit, reaching number three on the Billboard Hot 100. It is also her biggest hit in Australia, where it reached number three as well, and it topped the charts of Canada and Iceland. Elsewhere, the song reached number 16 in New Zealand, but it underperformed in the United Kingdom, peaking at number 95 in March 1997.

Chapman first performed "Give Me One Reason" during her 1988 tour, seven years before its release. She also performed the song on the December 16, 1989, episode of Saturday Night Live. Chapman earned the Grammy Award for Best Rock Song for the track, and it was also nominated for Record of the Year, Song of the Year, and Best Female Rock Vocal Performance at the Grammy Awards of 1997. A version of this song featuring Eric Clapton was included on the 1999 compilation album A Very Special Christmas Live. A music video was released to promote the single.

== Critical reception ==
Alan Jones from Music Week wrote, "Less intense and somewhat looser than her benchmark hit Fast Car, it perfectly mixes her folksy style with traditional R&B qualities, intelligent lyrics and that edgy distinctive voice. Compelling listening." Pitchfork said the song was, "strutting along a plucked, head-nodding guitar melody and Chapman’s grainy alto. Centering on an imbalanced relationship, each verse grows more frustrated from a lack of reciprocity; then the band kicks in and the pleading in her voice becomes cathartic, begging for a reason to stay while knowing it won’t come." In June 2026, CBS News included the song in its list of the 250 essential American songs of the past 250 years, one of two Chapman songs to make the list.

== Track listings ==
- US CD and cassette single
1. "Give Me One Reason" – 4:31
2. "The Rape of the World" – 7:07
- UK CD single
1. "Give Me One Reason" (radio edit) – 4:08
2. "Talkin' 'bout a Revolution" (LP version) – 2:38
3. "All That You Have Is Your Soul" (LP version) – 5:16
4. "Fast Car" (LP version) – 4:58
- European and Australian CD single
1. "Give Me One Reason" (single edit) – 3:59
2. "The Rape of the World" (LP version) – 7:07
3. "House of the Rising Sun" – 2:00
- Australian cassette single
1. "Give Me One Reason" (single edit) – 3:59
2. "House of the Rising Sun" – 2:00

== Charts ==
=== Weekly charts ===
Chart (1995–1997)	Peak position
Australia (ARIA)	3
Canada Top Singles (RPM)	1
Canada Adult Contemporary (RPM)	1
Iceland (Íslenski Listinn Topp 40)	1
New Zealand (Recorded Music NZ)	16
Scottish Singles Sales (Official Charts)	57
UK Singles (Official Charts)	95
US Billboard Hot 100	3
US Adult Alternative Airplay (Billboard)	3
US Adult Contemporary (Billboard)	3
US Adult Pop Airplay (Billboard)	1
US Hot R&B/Hip-Hop Songs (Billboard)	35
US Pop Airplay (Billboard)	2
US Cash Box Top 100	2

=== Year-end charts ===
Chart (1996)	Position
Australia (ARIA)	15
Canada Top Singles (RPM)	4
Canada Adult Contemporary (RPM)	4
Iceland (Íslenski Listinn Topp 40)	3
New Zealand (RIANZ)	35
US Billboard Hot 100	6
US Adult Contemporary (Billboard)	13
US Adult Top 40 (Billboard)	1
US Top 40/Mainstream (Billboard)	5
US Triple A (Billboard)	19

=== Decade-end charts ===
Chart (1990–1999)	Position
Canada (Nielsen SoundScan)	96

== Certifications ==
Region	Certification	Certified units/sales
Australia (ARIA)	Platinum	70,000^{^}
New Zealand (RMNZ) Physical sales	Gold	5,000^{*}
New Zealand (RMNZ) Digital sales + streaming	4× Platinum	120,000^{‡}
United Kingdom (BPI)	Silver	200,000^{‡}
United States (RIAA)	Platinum	1,100,000
^{*} Sales figures based on certification alone.^{^} Shipments figures based on certification alone.^{‡} Sales+streaming figures based on certification alone.

== Release history ==
Region	Date	Format(s)	Label(s)	Ref(s).
Australia	November 20, 1995	CD; cassette	Elektra	
United States	February 27, 1996	Contemporary hit radio	Elektra	
United States	March 19, 1996	CD; cassette	Elektra	
United Kingdom	March 10, 1997	CD; cassette	Elektra	

== Cover versions ==
In 2015, Kelly Clarkson covered the song for SiriusXM, garnering over 2.5 million views. She again covered the song for her talk show, The Kelly Clarkson Show, in 2021. The band Ruth covered the song on their 2009 digitally released The Covers EP. In 2021, Black Stone Cherry released two versions of the song on the deluxe edition of their album The Human Condition. Their versions peaked at number 25 on Billboard's Mainstream Rock Airplay chart.
