= Our Bright Future =

Studio album by Tracy Chapman
- Released: November 11, 2008
- Studios: Henson Recording Studios (Los Angeles, CA)
- Length: 42:20
- Label: Elektra
- Producers: Tracy Chapman; Larry Klein

Tracy Chapman chronology
Where You Live (2005)	Our Bright Future (2008)	Greatest Hits (2015)

Singles from Our Bright Future
- 1. "Sing for You" Released: 2008; 2. "Thinking of You" Released: 2009

Professional ratings
Aggregate scores
Source	Rating
Metacritic	65/100
Review scores
Source	Rating
AllMusic	3/5 stars
Evening Standard	3/5 stars
The Guardian	3/5 stars
Now	4/5 stars
Record Collector	4/5 stars
Slant Magazine	3/5 stars
Q	2/5 stars
Toronto Star	3.5/4 stars
Uncut	6/10

Our Bright Future is the eighth studio album by American singer-songwriter Tracy Chapman, released on November 11, 2008, via Elektra. The album was co-produced by Larry Klein, with the album's first single "Sing For You" being released digitally on October 31, 2008. In promotion for this album, Chapman appeared on radio stations across Europe with interviews and sessions. Chapman also performed "Sing for You" on The Tonight Show with Jay Leno. A European tour in support of the disc took place through November and December 2008. A US tour was planned for January 2009 but was postponed. Chapman toured Europe again in the Summer of 2009. Our Bright Future was certified Platinum in France, selling more than 200,000 copies there. It also was certified Gold in Switzerland, for sales in excess of 15,000. The album was nominated for the Grammy Award for Best Contemporary Folk Album. To date, it is Chapman's latest studio album.

== Track listing ==
All tracks are written by Tracy Chapman.

No.	Title	Length
1.	"Sing for You"	4:25
2.	"I Did It All"	3:10
3.	"Save Us All"	3:46
4.	"Our Bright Future"	4:13
5.	"For a Dream"	3:19
6.	"Thinking of You"	4:49
7.	"A Theory"	3:18
8.	"Conditional"	4:05
9.	"Something to See"	4:14
10.	"The First Person on Earth"	3:52
11.	"Spring"	3:07

== Personnel ==
- Tracy Chapman – acoustic and electric guitar, vocals
- Larry Goldings – keyboards
- Jared Faw – piano
- Steve Gadd – drums
- Joe Gore – acoustic and electric guitar, keyboards
- Larry Klein – bass guitar, organ
- Dean Parks – guitar, clarinet, mandolin, pedal steel guitar
- Joey Waronker – drums, percussion
- Rock Deadrick – background vocals
- Carla Kihlstedt – violin, nyckelharpa
- Michael Webster – keyboards
- Rob Burger – keyboards

== Charts ==
=== Weekly charts ===
Weekly chart performance for Our Bright Future
Chart (2008)	Peak position
Australian Albums (ARIA)	81
Austrian Albums (Ö3 Austria)	23
Belgian Albums (Ultratop Flanders)	39
Belgian Albums (Ultratop Wallonia)	22
Dutch Albums (Album Top 100)	56
French Albums (SNEP)	5
German Albums (Offizielle Top 100)	28
Irish Albums (IRMA)	82
Italian Albums (FIMI)	20
Norwegian Albums (VG-lista)	39
Spanish Albums (Promusicae)	42
Swedish Albums (Sverigetopplistan)	35
Swiss Albums (Schweizer Hitparade)	9
UK Albums (Official Charts)	75
US Billboard 200	57

=== Year-end charts ===
Year-end chart performance for Our Bright Future
Chart (2008)	Position
French Albums (SNEP)	41
Swiss Albums (Schweizer Hitparade)	85
Chart (2009)	Position
French Albums (SNEP)	78
Swiss Albums (Schweizer Hitparade)	97

== Certifications ==
Sales certifications for Our Bright Future
Region	Certification	Certified units/sales
France (SNEP)	Platinum	100,000^{*}
Switzerland (IFPI Switzerland)	Gold	15,000^{^}
^{*} Sales figures based on certification alone.^{^} Shipments figures based on certification alone.
