= Shmemel =

Shmemel (Hebrew: שמֶמֶל) is an Israeli funk rock band. The band was formed in 2007 and consists of ten members. Most of the lyrics are satirical and humorous and often controversial. The songs are in Hebrew and English. Some songs have controversial names and contents such as "Laughing at the Goyim" which deals with Israeli relations with other nations or "Berlin" which deals with emigration of Israelis to Berlin for a better financial life. The song featured lyrics such as "Even Jacob went to Egypt" and "where rents were half and salaries were double".
