= Matters of the Heart (Tracy Chapman album) =

Studio album by Tracy Chapman
- Released: April 28, 1992
- Studio: A&M Studios (Los Angeles, CA); The Complex Studios (Los Angeles, CA); The Hit Factory (New York, NY); Ocean Way Recording (Hollywood, CA)
- Genre: Indie rock; alternative pop
- Length: 43:34
- Label: Elektra
- Producer: Tracy Chapman; Jimmy Iovine

Tracy Chapman chronology
| Crossroads (1989) | Matters of the Heart (1992) | New Beginning (1995) |

Singles from Matters of the Heart
- 1. "Bang Bang Bang"; 2. "Dreaming on a World"

Matters of the Heart is the third studio album by American singer-songwriter Tracy Chapman, released on April 28, 1992, by Elektra Records. It was her first not to be produced or co-produced by David Kershenbaum.

== Track listing ==
All songs written by Tracy Chapman.

1. "Bang Bang Bang" – 4:21
2. "So" – 3:26
3. "I Used to Be a Sailor" – 3:56
4. "The Love That You Had" – 4:11
5. "Woman's Work" – 2:01
6. "If These Are the Things" – 4:40
7. "Short Supply" (Jigten; For Richmond) – 4:23
8. "Dreaming on a World" – 5:03
9. "Open Arms" – 4:34
10. "Matters of the Heart" – 6:59

== Overview ==
Professional ratings
Review scores
| Source | Rating |
|---|---|
| AllMusic | 2/5 stars |
| Calgary Herald | C |
| Entertainment Weekly | A− |
| NME | 3/10 |
| Orlando Sentinel | 2/3 stars |
| Rolling Stone | 2/5 stars |
| The Village Voice | (choice cut) |

=== Musical style ===
The record marked a notable switch in sound from Chapman's earlier works. AllMusic labeled it as "less bold and angry" than her preceding record, and Israbox took note of the "subtle elements of world music, blues, and jazz" included in the record.

== Personnel ==
=== Musicians ===
- Tracy Chapman – acoustic guitar, vocals
- Manu Katché – drums (tracks: 1 to 4, 7 to 10)
- Omar Hakim – drums (tracks: 6)
- Alex Acuña – percussion (tracks: 8, 9)
- Mino Cinelu and Steve Thornton – percussion (tracks: 1 to 4, 7 to 10)
- Michael Fisher – percussion (tracks: 5, 6, 9)
- Nellee Hooper – percussion (tracks: 9)
- Tony Levin – bass guitar (tracks: 2, 3, 7, 10)
- Randy "The Emperor" Jackson – bass guitar (tracks: 1, 8, 9)
- Larry Klein – bass guitar (tracks: 6)
- Bob Glaub – bass guitar (tracks: 4)
- Roy Bittan – accordion (tracks: 5), keyboard
- Charles Judge & Larry Williams – keyboard (tracks: 9)
- Mike Campbell – bouzouki (tracks: 2), mandolin (tracks: 3, 5), electric guitar (tracks: 1, 2, 6, 7)
- Vernon Reid – electric guitar (tracks: 1, 7, 8)
- Waddy Wachtel – electric guitar (tracks: 1, 6)
- Bobby Womack – acoustic Guitar (tracks: 9)

=== Production ===
- Producers: Tracy Chapman, Jimmy Iovine
- Engineers: David Bianco, Niko Bolas, Nellee Hooper, Femi Jiya, Bradshaw Leigh, Thom Panunzio, Mark "Spike" Stent
- Assistant engineers: Chad Blinman, Greg Goldman, Ed Korengo, Chad Munsey, Joe Pirrera, Rick Plank
- Mixing: Bob Clearmountain, Femi Jiya
- Mastering: Bob Ludwig
- Coordination: Susie Tallman
- Art direction: Tracy Chapman
- Photography: Herb Ritts

== Charts ==
=== Weekly charts ===
| Chart (1992) | Peak position |
|---|---|
| Australian Albums (ARIA) | 23 |
| Austrian Albums (Ö3 Austria) | 11 |
| Canadian Albums (RPM) | 55 |
| Dutch Albums (Album Top 100) | 33 |
| German Albums (Offizielle Top 100) | 13 |
| New Zealand Albums (RMNZ) | 23 |
| Swedish Albums (Sverigetopplistan) | 37 |
| Swiss Albums (Schweizer Hitparade) | 10 |
| UK Albums (Official Charts) | 19 |
| US Billboard 200 | 53 |

=== Year-end charts ===
| Chart (1992) | Position |
|---|---|
| German Albums (Offizielle Top 100) | 69 |

== Certifications ==
| Region | Certification | Certified units/sales |
|---|---|---|
| Australia (ARIA) | Gold | 35,000^{^} |
| Switzerland (IFPI Switzerland) | Gold | 25,000^{^} |
| United States (RIAA) | Gold | 500,000^{^} |
^{^} Shipments figures based on certification alone.
