= Tracy Chapman =

American singer-songwriter (born 1964)

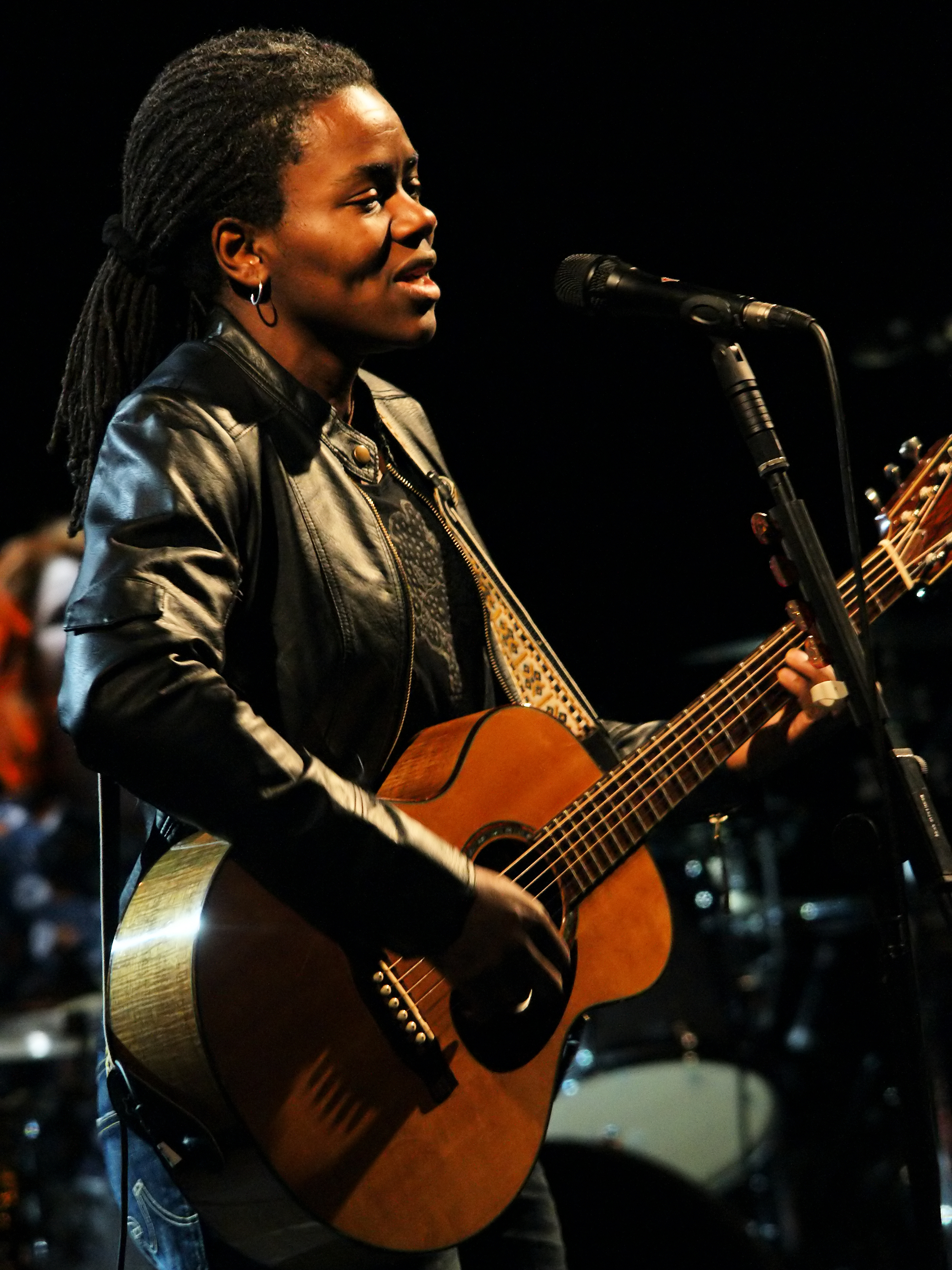
- Chapman performing in 2009

Background information
- Born: March 30, 1964 (age 62); Cleveland, Ohio, U.S.
- Genres: Folk; rock
- Occupation: Singer-songwriter
- Instruments: Vocals; guitar
- Works: Tracy Chapman discography
- Years active: 1986–present
- Label: Elektra

Tracy Chapman (born March 30, 1964) is an American singer-songwriter. She was signed to Elektra Records by Bob Krasnow in 1987. The following year she released her self-titled debut album, which became a commercial success, boosted by her appearance at the Nelson Mandela 70th Birthday Tribute concert, and was certified 6× platinum by the Recording Industry Association of America. The album received six Grammy Award nominations, including one for Album of the Year, three of which she won: Best New Artist, Best Female Pop Vocal Performance for her single "Fast Car", and Best Contemporary Folk Album. In 2025, the album was preserved in the National Recording Registry by the Library of Congress.

In 1989, she released her second album, Crossroads, which earned her an additional Grammy Award nomination for Best Contemporary Folk Album. Her third album, Matters of the Heart, followed in 1992. Her fourth album, New Beginning, was released in 1995 and became another worldwide success. It was certified 5× platinum by the RIAA and yielded the hit single "Give Me One Reason", which earned her the Grammy Award for Best Rock Song.

Five years would pass before the release of her fifth album, Telling Stories (2000). Let It Rain and Where You Live followed in 2002 and 2005, respectively. Her most recent studio album, Our Bright Future, was released in 2008. The remastered compilation album Greatest Hits, which she curated, was released in 2015. In 2023, Chapman became the first black person to score a country number one with a solo composition, and to win the Country Music Association Award for Song of the Year, when Luke Combs covered her song "Fast Car".

== Early life and education ==
Chapman was born in Cleveland and was raised by her mother, who bought her a ukulele at age three. Her parents divorced when she was four years old. She began playing guitar and writing songs at age eight. She says that she may have been first inspired to play the guitar by the television show Hee Haw. In her native Cleveland, she experienced frequent bullying and racially motivated assaults as a child.

Raised a Baptist, she attended an Episcopal high school and was accepted into the program A Better Chance, which sponsors students at college preparatory high schools away from their home communities. She graduated from Wooster School in Connecticut then attended Tufts University, majoring in anthropology. While a student at Tufts, she busked in nearby spots, including Harvard Square and on MBTA Red Line platforms. Chapman recorded demos of songs at the Tufts University radio station, WMFO, for copyright purposes while she was a student at Tufts, in exchange for the station's right to play her songs.

== Career ==
Chapman made her major-stage debut as an opening act for women's music pioneer Linda Tillery at Boston's Strand Theatre on May 3, 1985. Another Tufts student, Brian Koppelman, heard her playing and brought her to the attention of his father, Charles Koppelman, showing him a demo tape he had smuggled from her college radio station containing the song "Talkin' 'bout a Revolution". Charles Koppelman, who ran SBK Publishing, signed her in 1986. After she graduated from Tufts in 1987, he helped her to sign a contract with Elektra Records.

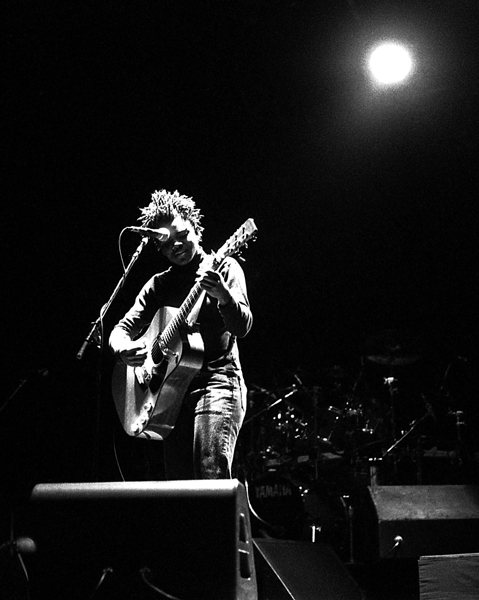
Chapman in Budapest, Hungary, 1988

At Elektra, she released Tracy Chapman (1988). The album was critically acclaimed, and she began touring and building a fanbase. "Fast Car" began its rise on the U.S. charts soon after she performed it at the televised Nelson Mandela 70th Birthday Tribute concert at Wembley Stadium in London in June 1988. At the concert, she initially performed a short set in the afternoon, but reached a larger audience when she was a last-minute stand in for Stevie Wonder, who had technical difficulties. This appearance is credited with greatly accelerating sales of the single and album. "Fast Car" became a No. 6 pop hit on the Billboard Hot 100 for the week ending August 27, 1988. Rolling Stone ranked the song at number 167 on their 2010 list of "The 500 Greatest Songs of All Time". "Talkin' 'bout a Revolution", the follow-up to "Fast Car", charted at No. 75 and was followed by "Baby Can I Hold You", which peaked at No. 48. The album sold well, going multi-platinum and winning three Grammy Awards, including an honor for her as Best New Artist. Later in 1988 she was a featured performer on the worldwide Amnesty International Human Rights Now! Tour.

Her follow-up album, Crossroads (1989), was less commercially successful than her debut had been, but it still achieved platinum status in the U.S. In 1992, she released Matters of the Heart. Her fourth album, New Beginning (1995), proved successful, selling over five million copies in the U.S. alone. The album included the hit single "Give Me One Reason", which won the 1997 Grammy for Best Rock Song and became her most successful single in the U.S. to date, peaking at No. 3 on the Billboard Hot 100, and going Platinum. Her fifth album, Telling Stories, was released in 2000, and later went gold. She released her sixth album, Let It Rain, in 2002.

She was commissioned by the American Conservatory Theater to compose music for its production of Athol Fugard's Blood Knot, a play about apartheid in South Africa, staged in early 2008. Atlantic Records released her eighth studio album, Our Bright Future (2008). The album earned her a Grammy nomination for Best Contemporary Folk Album the following year.

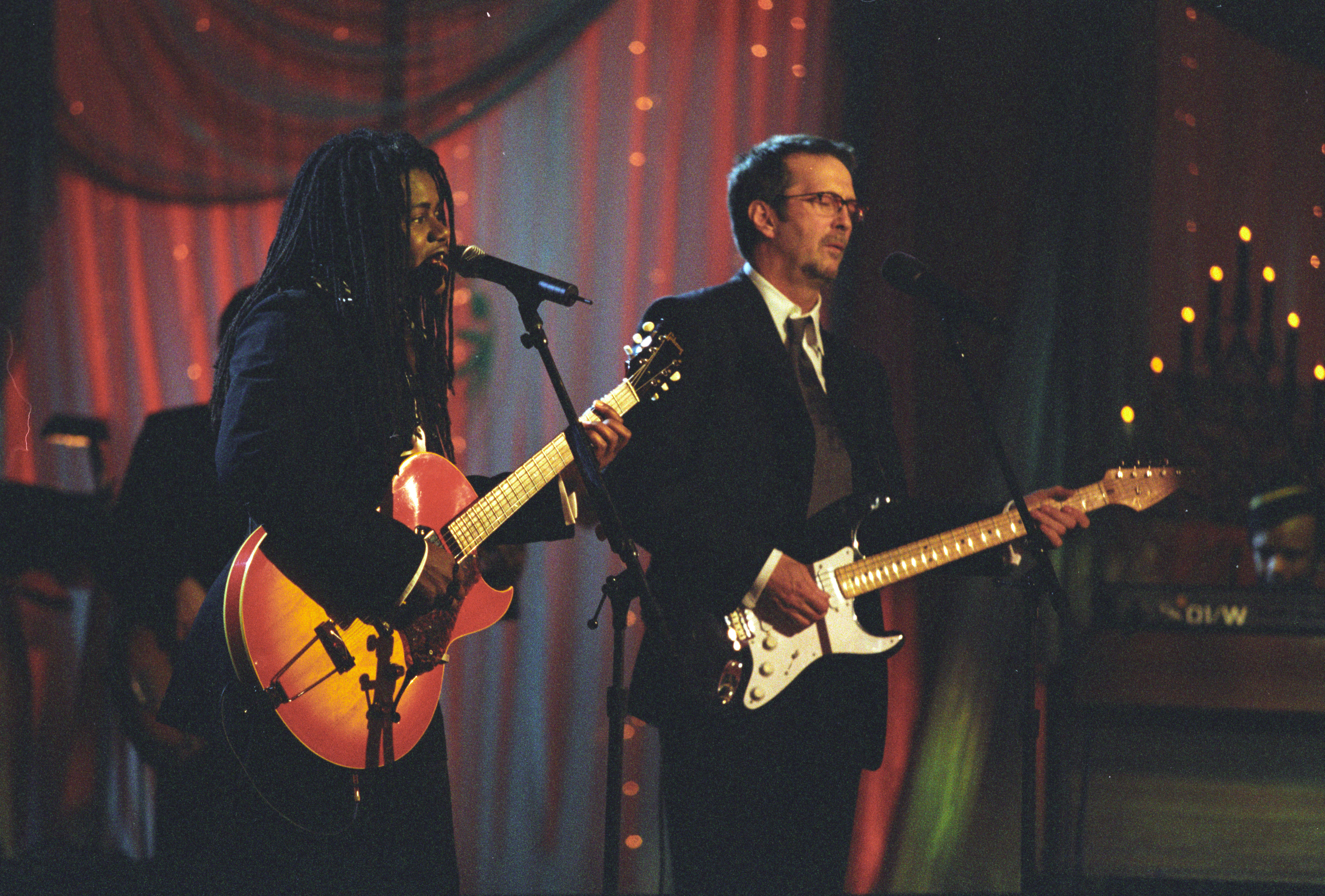
Chapman and Eric Clapton on stage at a White House Special Olympics dinner, December 1998

She was appointed a member of the 2014 Sundance Film Festival U.S. Documentary jury. She performed Ben E. King's "Stand By Me" on one of the final episodes of the Late Show with David Letterman in April 2015. The performance became a viral hit and was the focus of various news articles including some by Billboard and The Huffington Post.

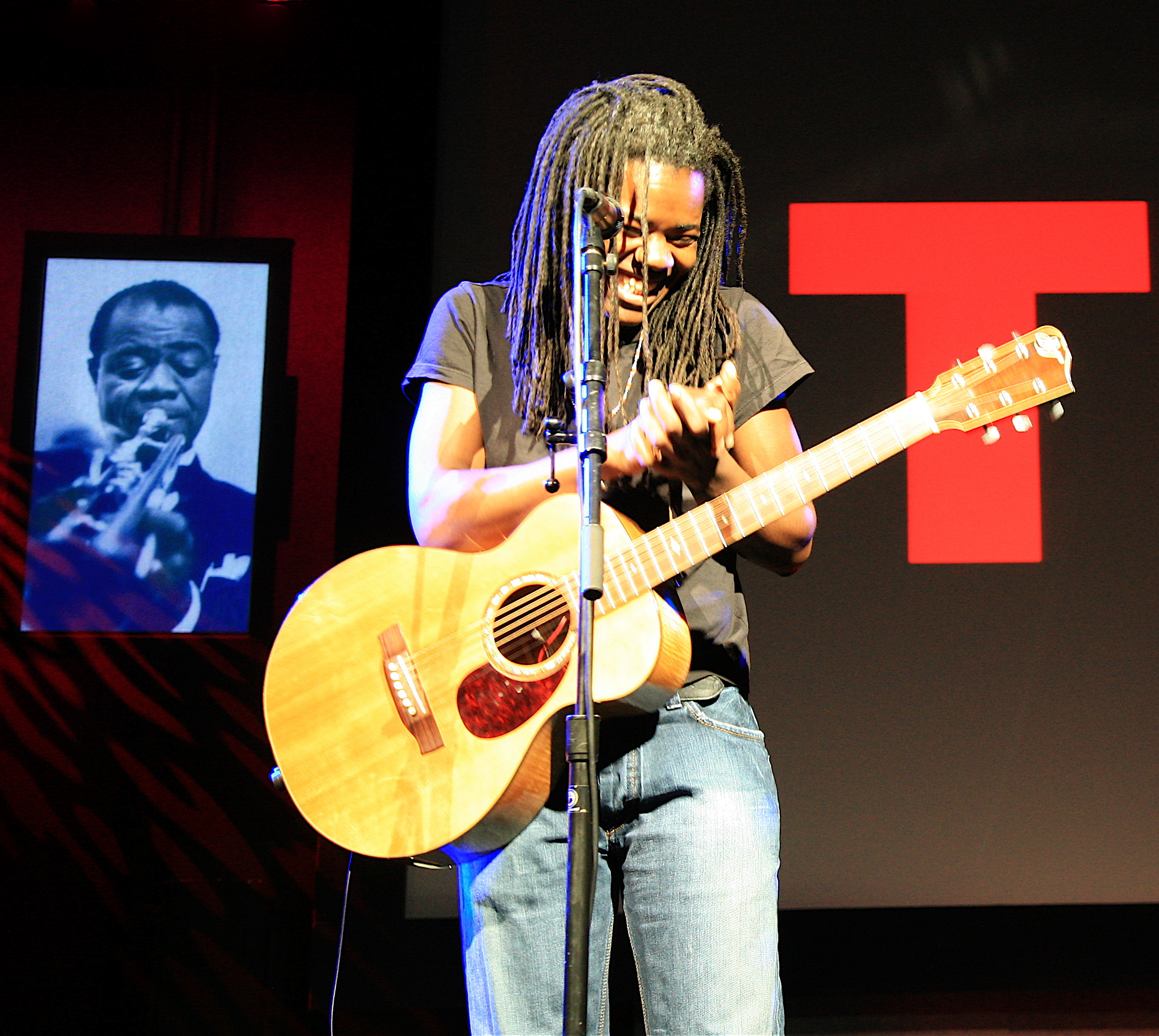
Chapman at a 2007 performance

On November 20, 2015, she released Greatest Hits, consisting of 18 tracks including the live version of "Stand by Me". The album is her first global compilation release.

In October 2018, she sued the rapper Nicki Minaj over copyright infringement, alleging that Minaj had sampled her song "Baby Can I Hold You" without permission. Chapman stated that she had "repeatedly denied" permission for "Baby Can I Hold You" to be sampled. The lawsuit alleged that Minaj had engaged in copyright infringement (a) by creating the song "Sorry" and (b) by distributing it; she requested an injunction to prevent Minaj from releasing the song. According to the lawsuit, Chapman has a policy of declining all requests for permission to sample her songs. In September 2020, District Court Judge Virginia A. Phillips granted summary judgment in favor of Minaj on the first count of her complaint, stating that Minaj's experimentation with Chapman's song constituted fair use rather than copyright infringement. However, the judge ruled that the second count of the complaint should go to trial. In January 2021, the dispute was settled when Minaj paid Chapman $450,000.

On the eve of the 2020 United States presidential election she performed "Talkin' 'bout a Revolution" on Late Night with Seth Meyers, encouraging people to vote.

When Luke Combs' version of her song "Fast Car" hit number one on the Country Airplay chart in July 2023, Chapman became the first Black woman to score a country number one with a solo composition. At the 57th Annual Country Music Association Awards in November 2023, she became the first Black woman to ever take home a CMA Award, winning Song of the Year for "Fast Car", which also made her the first Black songwriter to win that award. During the 66th Grammy Awards on February 4, 2024, she joined Combs onstage to sing "Fast Car".

== Social activism ==
Chapman is politically and socially active. In a 2009 interview with National Public Radio, she said, "I'm approached by lots of organizations and lots of people who want me to support their various charitable efforts in some way. And I look at those requests and I basically try to do what I can. And I have certain interests of my own, generally an interest in human rights." In 1988 she performed in London as part of a worldwide concert tour to commemorate the 40th anniversary of the Universal Declaration of Human Rights with Amnesty International. That same year she performed at a tribute concert in honor of South African activist and leader Nelson Mandela's 70th birthday, an event which raised money for South Africa's Anti-Apartheid Movement and several children's charities. She also performed at the event to commemorate the 50th anniversary of Amnesty International held in Paris on December 10, 1998, known as "The Struggle Continues...". She was one of the guest artists at Pavarotti & Friends for Cambodia and Tibet on June 6, 2000, at which she performed a critically acclaimed duet with Luciano Pavarotti of "Baby Can I Hold You Tonight". In 2004, she performed and rode in the AIDS/LifeCycle event.

She has been involved with Cleveland's elementary schools, producing an educational music video highlighting achievements in African-American history. She sponsored "Crossroads in Black History", an essay contest for high school students in Cleveland and other cities.

She received an honorary doctorate from Saint Xavier University in Chicago in 1997. In 2004 she was given an honorary doctorate in Fine Arts by her alma mater, Tufts University, recognizing her commitment to social activism.

I'm fortunate that I've been able to do my work and be involved in certain organizations, certain endeavors, and offered some assistance in some way. Whether that is about raising money or helping to raise awareness, just being another body to show some force and conviction for a particular idea. Finding out where the need is – and if someone thinks you're going to be helpful, then helping.

— Tracy Chapman

On April 16, 2023, the South African Presidency announced that Chapman along with others would be bestowed with a National Order – The Order of the Companions of O. R. Tambo which "recognizes eminent foreign nationals for friendship shown to South Africa. It is therefore an Order of peace, cooperation and active expression of solidarity and support." The Order was bestowed in Silver on her "for her contribution to the fight for freedom by participating in efforts to free Nelson Mandela and raising awareness of human rights violations globally." An investiture ceremony for the bestowment was held on April 28, 2023.

Chapman often performs at charity events such as Make Poverty History, amfAR, and AIDS/LifeCycle. She is a feminist.

== Personal life ==
Although Chapman has never publicly discussed her sexual orientation, writer Alice Walker has said she and Chapman were in a romantic relationship during the mid-1990s. Chapman maintains a strong separation between her personal and professional life. "I have a public life that's my work life and I have my personal life", she said. "In some ways, the decision to keep the two things separate relates to the work I do."

Chapman lives in San Francisco.

== Legacy ==
A street has been named after Tracy Chapman in Saint-Jean-d'Heurs, a rural commune of France.

== Discography ==
=== Studio albums ===
- Tracy Chapman (1988)
- Crossroads (1989)
- Matters of the Heart (1992)
- New Beginning (1995)
- Telling Stories (2000)
- Let It Rain (2002)
- Where You Live (2005)
- Our Bright Future (2008)

== Awards and nominations ==
=== Grammy Awards ===
Grammy Awards
Year	Work	Award	Result	Ref
1989	Herself	Best New Artist	Won	
1989	Tracy Chapman	Album of the Year	Nominated	
1989	Tracy Chapman	Best Contemporary Folk Album	Won	
1989	"Fast Car"	Record of the Year	Nominated	
1989	"Fast Car"	Song of the Year	Nominated	
1989	"Fast Car"	Best Female Pop Vocal Performance	Won	
1990	Crossroads	Best Contemporary Folk Album	Nominated	
1997	New Beginning	Best Pop Album	Nominated	
1997	"Give Me One Reason"	Record of the Year	Nominated	
1997	"Give Me One Reason"	Song of the Year	Nominated	
1997	"Give Me One Reason"	Best Female Rock Vocal Performance	Nominated	
1997	"Give Me One Reason"	Best Rock Song	Won	
2010	Our Bright Future	Best Contemporary Folk Album	Nominated	

=== Other awards and nominations ===
Year	Ceremony	Award	Nominated work	Result	Ref
1988	Billboard Music Awards	Best Female Video	"Fast Car"	Won	
1989	Soul Train Music Awards	Best R&B/Urban Contemporary Album of the Year, Female	Tracy Chapman	Nominated	
1989	Danish Music Awards	Best International Album	Tracy Chapman	Won	
1989	BRIT Awards	Best International Breakthrough Act	Herself	Won	
1989	BRIT Awards	Best International Solo Female	Herself	Won	
1989	Edison Awards	Best Singer/Songwriter	Herself	Won	
1989	MTV Video Music Awards	Best Female Video	"Fast Car"	Nominated	
1989	American Music Awards	Favorite Pop/Rock New Artist	Herself	Won	
1989	American Music Awards	Favorite Pop/Rock Female Artist	Herself	Nominated	
1993	ECHO Awards	Best International Female	Herself	Nominated	
1996	MTV Video Music Awards	Best Female Video	"Give Me One Reason"	Nominated	
1996	APRA Music Awards	Most Performed Foreign Work	"Give Me One Reason"	Nominated	
2001	California Music Awards	Outstanding Female Vocalist	Herself	Nominated	
2002	IFPI Platinum Europe Music Awards	Album title	Collection	Won	
2006	Meteor Ireland Music Awards	Best International Female	Herself	Nominated	
2009	SXSWi: Web Awards Honor	Pop Music	Herself	Nominated	
2023	Country Music Association Awards	Song of the Year	"Fast Car"	Won	
2024	Academy of Country Music Awards	Song of the Year	"Fast Car"	Nominated	
2024	Induction and Awards Gala	Songwriters Hall Of Fame	Herself	Nominated	

Awards and achievements
Preceded by Jody Watley	Grammy Award for Best New Artist; 1989	Succeeded by Milli Vanilli (Award later revoked)
Preceded by Whitney Houston for "I Wanna Dance with Somebody (Who Loves Me)"	Grammy Award for Best Female Pop Vocal Performance; 1989 for "Fast Car"	Succeeded by Bonnie Raitt for "Nick of Time"
Preceded by Steve Goodman for Unfinished Business	Grammy Award for Best Contemporary Folk Album; 1989 for Tracy Chapman	Succeeded by Indigo Girls for Indigo Girls
Preceded by Glen Ballard and Alanis Morissette for "You Oughta Know"	Grammy Award for Best Rock Song; 1997 for "Give Me One Reason"	Succeeded by The Wallflowers for "One Headlight"
