= Let It Rain (Tracy Chapman album) =

Studio album by Tracy Chapman
- Released: October 15, 2002
- Recorded: March – August 2002
- Studios: Plant Studios, Sausalito, California
- Label: Elektra
- Producers: Tracy Chapman, John Parish

Tracy Chapman chronology
Collection (2001)	Let It Rain (2002)	Where You Live (2005)

Singles from Let It Rain
- 1. "You're The One" Released: 2002; 2. "Another Sun" Released: 2003

Professional ratings
Aggregate scores
Source	Rating
Metacritic	63/100
Review scores
Source	Rating
AllMusic	3/5 stars
Blender	2/5 stars
E!	B+
Entertainment Weekly	B
The Guardian	4/5 stars
Mojo	3.5/5 stars
Q	3/5 stars
Rolling Stone	2/5 stars
Uncut	7/10

Let It Rain is the sixth studio album by American singer-songwriter Tracy Chapman, released on October 15, 2002, by Elektra Records. The album was co-produced by John Parish. It produced two singles: "You're the One" and "Another Sun".

== Track listing ==
All songs written by Tracy Chapman.

No.	Title	Length
1.	"Let it Rain"	3:40
2.	"Another Sun"	3:11
3.	"You're the One"	3:07
4.	"In the Dark"	5:02
5.	"Almost"	3:52
6.	"Hard Wired"	3:37
7.	"Say Hallelujah"	2:11
8.	"Broken"	4:25
9.	"Happy"	4:00
10.	"Goodbye"	2:28
11.	"Over in Love (Instrumental)"	1:47
12.	"I Am Yours"	3:36

International edition
No.	Title	Length
11.	"I Am Yours"	3:36
12.	"Over in Love"	2:49

Tour Edition Bonus Live CD
No.	Title	Length
1.	"You're the One" (Live)	3:36
2.	"Give Me One Reason" (Live)	4:49
3.	"Talkin' 'bout a Revolution" (Live)	3:32
4.	"I Am Yours" (Live)	3:40
5.	"Get up, Stand up" (Live)	4:58

=== Cover version ===
- "Get up, Stand up" (on this release written without the comma) is a The Wailers cover. The song was originally released on the album Burnin' in 1973.

=== Trivia ===
- All songs of the bonus live CD were recorded at the Tränenpalast, Berlin on December 2nd, 2002.

== Personnel ==
- Tracy Chapman – acoustic guitar, bass guitar (2), clarinet (1), electric guitar, lead vocals, handclapping (3, 7), electric banjo (2)
- Bill Bennet – oboe
- Matthew Brubeck – cello
- Jeremy Cohen – violin
- Linda Ghidossi de Luca – viola
- Joe Gore – acoustic guitar, piano, electric guitar, keyboard, ukulele, bazouki, gourd, lap steel guitar
- Steve Hunter – electric guitar
- Carla Kihlstedt – violin
- Greg Leisz – dobro, pedal steel, electric guitar, lap steel guitar, mando-guitar, baritone guitar
- John Parish – acoustic guitar, bass guitar, percussion, background vocals
- Andy Stoller – bass guitar
- Larry Taylor – upright bass
- Jeanie Tracy – background vocals
- Joey Waronker – percussion, drums, tambourine, handclapping, cajon, shaker
- Patrick Warren – organ, piano, accordion, keyboard, bells, tack piano

== Production ==
- Producers: Tracy Chapman, John Parish
- Engineer: Paul DuGre
- Mixing: Paul DuGre
- Mastering: John Cuniberti
- Photography: Jay Blakesberg
- Cover photo: Jim Herrington

== Charts ==
=== Weekly charts ===
Chart (2002)	Peak position
Australian Albums (ARIA)	25
Austrian Albums (Ö3 Austria)	6
Belgian Albums (Ultratop Flanders)	43
Belgian Albums (Ultratop Wallonia)	32
Dutch Albums (Album Top 100)	75
French Albums (SNEP)	3
German Albums (Offizielle Top 100)	15
Irish Albums (IRMA)	47
Italian Albums (FIMI)	18
New Zealand Albums (RMNZ)	45
Norwegian Albums (VG-lista)	24
Scottish Albums (Official Charts)	31
Swedish Albums (Sverigetopplistan)	27
Swiss Albums (Schweizer Hitparade)	4
UK Albums (Official Charts)	36
US Billboard 200	25

=== Year-end charts ===
Chart (2002)	Position
French Albums (SNEP)	61
Swiss Albums (Schweizer Hitparade)	73

== Certifications ==
Region	Certification	Certified units/sales
Austria (IFPI Austria)	Gold	15,000^{*}
France (SNEP)	2× Gold	200,000^{*}
Switzerland (IFPI Switzerland)	Gold	20,000^{^}
United Kingdom (BPI)	Silver	60,000^{*}
^{*} Sales figures based on certification alone.^{^} Shipments figures based on certification alone.
