= Where You Live =

Studio album by Tracy Chapman
- Released: September 13, 2005
- Studio: The Sound Factory (San Francisco, CA); Sunset Sound (Hollywood, CA)
- Length: 46:54
- Label: Elektra
- Producer: Tracy Chapman, Tchad Blake

Tracy Chapman chronology
Let It Rain (2002)	Where You Live (2005)	Our Bright Future (2008)

Singles from Where You Live
- 1. "Change" Released: 2005; 2. "America" Released: 2006

Professional ratings
Aggregate scores
Source	Rating
Metacritic	71/100
Review scores
Source	Rating
AllMusic	4/5 stars
Blender	3.5/5 stars
The Guardian	3/5 stars
Mojo	3.5/5 stars
Now	4/5 stars
The Observer	3/5 stars
Q	2/5 stars
Uncut	8/10

Where You Live is the seventh studio album by American singer-songwriter Tracy Chapman, released on September 13, 2005, by Elektra Records. The album was co-produced by Tchad Blake. It produced two singles: "Change" and "America".

Its name comes from the line 'home is where you live/home is where you die', from the fourth song in this album, Going Back.

== Track listing ==
All songs are written by Tracy Chapman.

1. "Change" – 5:06
2. "Talk to You" – 4:27
3. "3,000 Miles" – 5:58
4. "Going Back" – 5:22
5. "Don't Dwell" – 3:22
6. "Never Yours" – 3:37
7. "America" – 3:43
8. "Love's Proof" – 3:44
9. "Before Easter" – 3:03
10. "Taken" – 3:42
11. "Be and Be Not Afraid" – 4:44
12. "Lose Your Love" – 6:27 (Japanese bonus track)

== Personnel ==
- Tracy Chapman – vocals, acoustic & electric guitar, keyboards (2, 4), clarinet (3), harmonica (11), electric mandolin (11), percussion (7), glockenspiel (3), keyboard bass (8), hand drums (7)
- Paul Bushnell – bass
- Flea – bass (1, 2, 7)
- Mitchell Froom – organ, celeste, harpsichord, Fender Rhodes, Wurlitzer
- Joe Gore – acoustic & electric guitar, dobro, percussion, bass, lap steel guitar, keyboard bass
- David Piltch – upright bass
- Michael Webster – keyboards
- Quinn Smith – percussion, piano, drums, glockenspiel

== Charts ==
=== Weekly charts ===
Chart (2005)	Peak position
Austrian Albums (Ö3 Austria)	7
Belgian Albums (Ultratop Flanders)	23
Belgian Albums (Ultratop Wallonia)	20
Dutch Albums (Album Top 100)	38
French Albums (SNEP)	7
German Albums (Offizielle Top 100)	12
Italian Albums (FIMI)	9
Scottish Albums (Official Charts)	46
Spanish Albums (Promusicae)	23
Swedish Albums (Sverigetopplistan)	28
Swiss Albums (Schweizer Hitparade)	4
UK Albums (Official Charts)	43
US Billboard 200	49

=== Year-end charts ===
Chart (2005)	Position
French Albums (SNEP)	120
Swiss Albums (Schweizer Hitparade)	82

== Certifications ==
Region	Certification	Certified units/sales
France (SNEP)	Gold	100,000^{*}
Switzerland (IFPI Switzerland)	Gold	20,000^{^}
^{*} Sales figures based on certification alone.^{^} Shipments figures based on certification alone.
