= Talkin' 'bout a Revolution =

1988 single by Tracy Chapman

Single by Tracy Chapman

from the album Tracy Chapman
- B-side: "If Not Now..."; "Behind the Wall" (live); "She's Got Her Ticket"
- Released: July 1988
- Studio: Powertrax Studios (Hollywood, CA)
- Genre: Folk; folk rock
- Length: 2:39
- Label: Elektra
- Songwriter: Tracy Chapman
- Producer: David Kershenbaum

Tracy Chapman singles chronology
"Fast Car" (1988)	"Talkin' 'bout a Revolution" (1988)	"Baby Can I Hold You" (1988)

Official audio
- "Talkin' 'bout a Revolution" on YouTube

"Talkin' 'bout a Revolution" is a single from American singer-songwriter Tracy Chapman's self-titled debut album. Written while Chapman was in high school and released in 1988 by Elektra Records after she was discovered at Tufts University, the politically aware song spent four weeks on the Billboard Hot 100 in the United States, peaking at No. 75. It reached the top 40 in Austria, Belgium, France, the Netherlands, and New Zealand.

Lyrically, the song is regarded as a tone-setter on the album, providing political and social discourse and influenced by her own life experiences. The musical style of the song is thought to be in tune with others on Tracy Chapman, with an emphasis on the guitar in the melody and her vocals. The song has been covered several times by various artists and bands over the years.

The song has also been used in political contexts since its release, such Bernie Sanders' campaign in the 2016 United States presidential election and the 2020 presidential election.

== Background and release ==
Tracy Chapman went to a preparatory high school in Connecticut, where she felt outcast economically as a student receiving financial aid. She wrote "Talkin' 'bout a Revolution", which includes lyrics about economic differences, as a result of this experience. Some of Chapman's classmates from the time recall the song.

Later on, when she was studying at Tufts University in Massachusetts, another student, Brian Koppelman, witnessed her perform some of her songs. He smuggled a tape from WMFO, the university's radio station, and played it for his father Charles Koppelman, who ran SBK Publishing. This led to Chapman's signing with Elektra Records in 1987. Her debut album Tracy Chapman was then recorded with producer David Kershenbaum, before being released in 1988 with "Talkin' bout a Revolution" as the opening track. The song then became a single, in addition to "Fast Car".

== Music and lyrics ==
According to author and musicologist Sheila Whiteley, "Talkin' 'bout a Revolution" sets a tone for the album as the opening song and references political and social context. A lyrical interpretation is that the song is about an aspiration for activism, specifically related to economic inequalities in the United States at the time. It is thought that Tracy Chapman provides conscious commentary through the lyrics about wanting future change and action. Phrases in the song are frequently repeated.

The style of the guitar use on the song is thought to be cohesive with the first single "Fast Car". There is a repetition in the melody that includes the guitar style, aligning the song with others in the folk genre. A low register of Chapman's voice is used in much of the song, helping to emphasize what she is saying. A higher voice is used in some parts of the song as well, namely its chorus.

== Charts ==
Chart (1988)	Peak position
Australia (ARIA)	66
Austria (Ö3 Austria Top 40)	29
Belgium (Ultratop 50 Flanders)	36
Canada Top Singles (RPM)	42
Europe (Eurochart Hot 100)	78
France (SNEP)	22
Italy Airplay (Music & Media)	12
Netherlands (Dutch Top 40)	21
Netherlands (Single Top 100)	18
New Zealand (Recorded Music NZ)	32
UK Singles (Official Charts)	85
US Billboard Hot 100	75
US Adult Contemporary (Billboard)	45
US Alternative Airplay (Billboard)	24
US Hot R&B/Hip-Hop Songs (Billboard)	78
US Mainstream Rock (Billboard)	22

== Certifications ==
Region	Certification	Certified units/sales
Denmark (IFPI Danmark)	Gold	45,000^{‡}
Italy (FIMI)	Gold	50,000^{‡}
New Zealand (RMNZ)	Platinum	30,000^{‡}
United Kingdom (BPI)	Gold	400,000^{‡}
^{‡} Sales+streaming figures based on certification alone.

== Cover versions ==
The song was covered by the rock group Living Colour during multiple live performances in 1989. Their version of the song was released with the 1989 single "Open Letter (To a Landlord)".

Pliers of Chaka Demus & Pliers and the Firehouse Crew released a cover version that was later re-released as "Revolution Sounds".

German punk band Ausbruch recorded a cover version for their 1994 album Auf Alte Zeiten.

English punk band Leatherface released a cover version on their EP "Compact and Bijou" in 1992.

Reel Big Fish covered the song on their 2005 album titled We're Not Happy 'Til You're Not Happy.

The song was also covered by Afro Fiesta as part of a 2009 Playing for Change album titled Songs Around the World.

In 2010, this song was translated into Cree and covered by Art Napoleon on his album Creeland Covers.

In February 2011, Israeli band Shmemel covered the song and added a verse inspired by the Arab Spring revolutions, with the new song being given the title "Talking About an Arab Revolution".

Clarence Bekker, of Playing for Change, sang a cover version to commemorate Martin Luther King Jr. Day, 2017.

== Legacy ==
"Talkin' 'bout a Revolution" has been used in political contexts since its release, including when Chapman herself recorded a performance of the song to air on Late Night with Seth Meyers on the eve of the 2020 United States presidential election. In this case, she encouraged people to vote the following day. The song was also used during Vermont Senator Bernie Sanders' 2016 presidential campaign, specifically as it was played at his campaign rallies. It has been well-regarded as a social justice song, with it being named to Rolling Stone's "The 100 Best Protest Songs of All Time" list in 2025, coming in at No. 83.
