= New Beginning (Tracy Chapman album) =

Studio album by Tracy Chapman
- Released: November 14, 1995
- Studios: The Site (San Rafael, CA); NRG Recording Studios (North Hollywood, CA); Scream Studios (Studio City, CA)
- Genres: Folk rock, blues
- Length: 62:19
- Label: Elektra
- Producers: Tracy Chapman, Don Gehman

Tracy Chapman chronology
Matters of the Heart (1992)	New Beginning (1995)	Telling Stories (2000)

Singles from New Beginning
- 1. "Give Me One Reason" Released: 1995; 2. "New Beginning" Released: 1996; 3. "The Promise" Released: 1996; 4. "Smoke and Ashes" Released: 1996

Professional ratings
Review scores
Source	Rating
AllMusic	3/5 stars
Cash Box	favorable
Christgau’s Consumer Guide	B−
Entertainment Weekly	B
The Guardian	3/5 stars
Rolling Stone	2/5 stars
The Rolling Stone Album Guide	3.5/5 stars

New Beginning is the fourth album by singer-songwriter Tracy Chapman, released in 1995. According to Nielsen Soundscan, it is her biggest-selling recording since 1991, with 3.8 million copies sold, and according to the RIAA, it has shipped five million copies in the United States.

The album's sound consists of Chapman's trademark acoustic folk-rock sound and is mainly made up of slow low-key tunes and a few upbeat tracks. One notable exception is the hit "Give Me One Reason", which is a blues piece. Chapman earned the Grammy Award for Best Rock Song for the track, and it was also nominated for Record of the Year, Song of the Year, and Best Female Rock Vocal Performance at the Grammy Awards of 1997.

Aside from the single “Give Me One Reason”, all of the songs are at least 4:56. The song "Unsung Psalm" was originally written and recorded for this album, but was cut. It was later included on her 2000 album Telling Stories. According to Billboard magazine, the "New Beginning" single was the first disc to have a sticker printed on the back of the packaging detailing system requirements to play the multi-media footage.

The use of a didgeridoo in the "New Beginning" track was a source of controversy. Chapman was taught to play at the Didgeridoo University in Alice Springs; however, the use of a didgeridoo by women is taboo in many aboriginal nations. The album also featured an extensive use of backup singers, which was very rare in Chapman's earlier works.

== Track listing ==
All songs written by Tracy Chapman.

1. "Heaven's Here on Earth" – 5:23
2. "New Beginning" – 5:33
3. "Smoke and Ashes" – 6:39
4. "Cold Feet" – 5:40
5. "At This Point in My Life" – 5:09
6. "The Promise" – 5:28
7. "The Rape of the World" – 7:07
8. "Tell It Like It Is" – 6:08
9. "Give Me One Reason" – 4:31
10. "Remember the Tinman" – 5:45
11. "I'm Ready" – 4:56
12. "Save a Place for Me" (hidden track)

== Personnel ==
=== Musicians ===
- Tracy Chapman – organ, acoustic guitar, electric guitar, lead vocals, background vocals
- Rock Deadrick – percussion, drums, background vocals
- Lili Haydn – violin
- Steve Ferrone – drums
- Adam Levy – electric guitar, background vocals
- Eric Rigler – tin whistle, Uilleann pipes
- Scott Roewe – didgeridoo
- Glenys Rogers – percussion, background vocals
- John Philip Shenale – keyboards
- Andy Stoller – bass guitar, background vocals, tamboura
- Cameron Stone – cello
- John Thomas – piano

=== Production ===
- Producers: Tracy Chapman, Don Gehman
- Engineer: Don Gehman
- Assistant engineers: John Ewing, Jr., Kevin Scott, Doug Trantow
- Mixing: Don Gehman
- Mastering: Eddy Schreyer
- Production coordination: Diane Medak
- Art direction: Lee Cantelon
- Design: Lee Cantelon
- Graphic layout: Lavonne Murlowski
- Photography: Christine Alicino

== Charts ==
=== Weekly charts ===
Chart (1995–96)	Peak position
Australian Albums (ARIA)	6
Austrian Albums (Ö3 Austria)	9
French Albums (SNEP)	44
German Albums (Offizielle Top 100)	60
New Zealand Albums (RMNZ)	8
Swiss Albums (Schweizer Hitparade)	22
US Billboard 200	4

=== Year-end charts ===
Chart (1996)	Position
Australian Albums (ARIA)	17
New Zealand Albums (RMNZ)	11
US Billboard 200	18

Chart (1997)	Position
US Billboard 200	119

== Certifications ==
Region	Certification	Certified units/sales
Australia (ARIA)	3× Platinum	210,000^{^}
Austria (IFPI Austria)	Gold	25,000^{*}
Canada (Music Canada)	7× Platinum	700,000^{^}
Denmark (IFPI Danmark)	Gold	10,000^{‡}
Germany (BVMI)	Gold	250,000^{^}
New Zealand (RMNZ)	Platinum	15,000^{^}
United Kingdom (BPI)	Silver	60,000^{^}
United States (RIAA)	5× Platinum	5,000,000^{^}
^{*} Sales figures based on certification alone.^{^} Shipments figures based on certification alone.^{‡} Sales+streaming figures based on certification alone.

== Awards ==
39th Annual Grammy Awards

Grammy Awards
Year	Work	Award	Result	Ref
1997	New Beginning	Best Pop Album	Nominated	
1997	"Give Me One Reason"	Song of the Year	Nominated	
1997	"Give Me One Reason"	Record of the Year	Nominated	
1997	"Give Me One Reason"	Best Female Rock Vocal Performance	Nominated	
1997	"Give Me One Reason"	Best Rock Song	Won	
