= David Kershenbaum =

American record producer

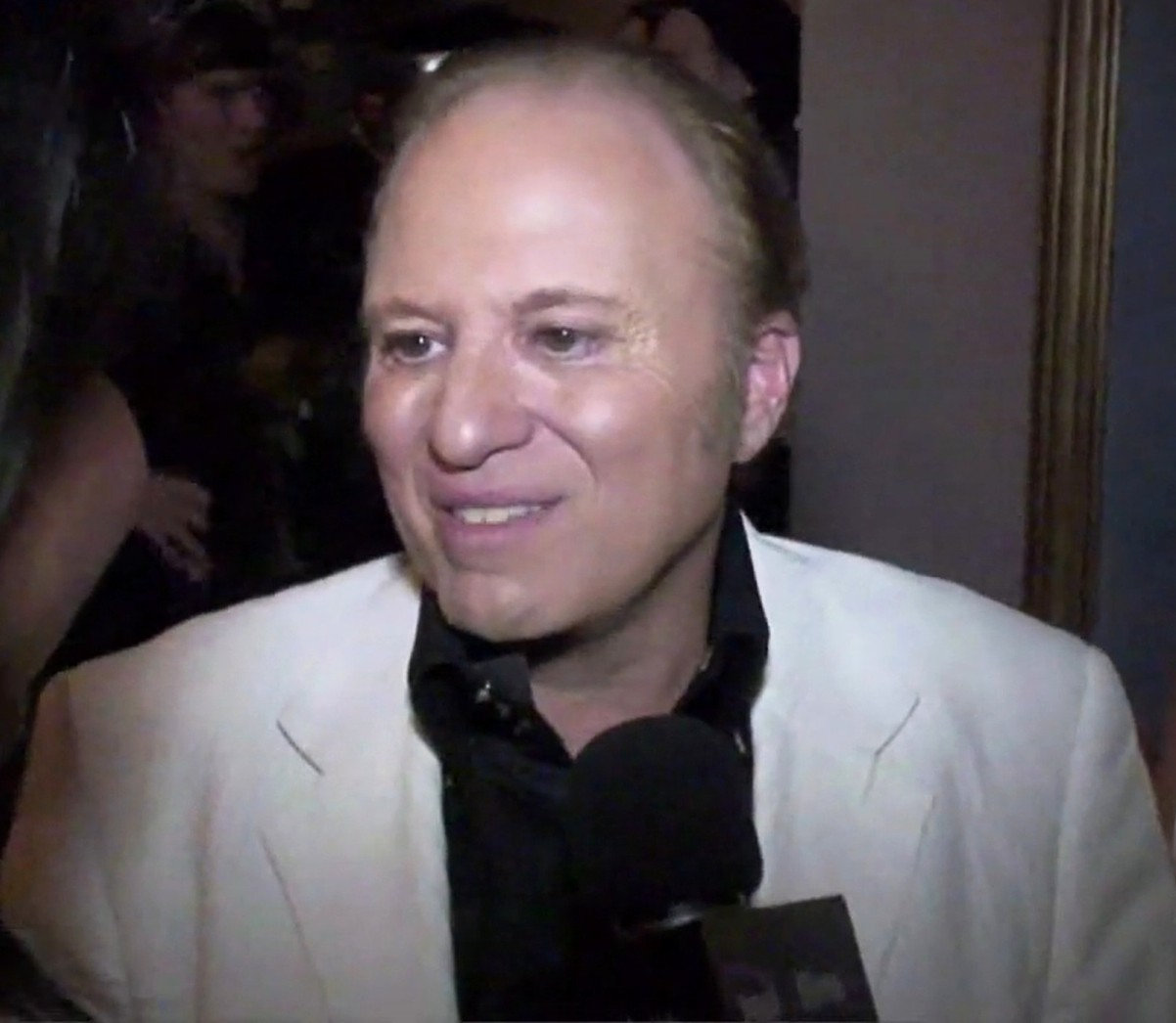
- Kershenbaum in 2008
- Born: Springfield, Missouri, U.S.
- Occupations: Record producer; executive; entrepreneur
- Website: David Kershenbaum's website

David Kershenbaum is an American record producer and entrepreneur, born in Springfield, Missouri. He has worked with many artists including Duran Duran, Tracy Chapman, Joe Jackson, Laura Branigan, Bryan Adams, Supertramp, Cat Stevens, Elkie Brooks, and Tori Amos. As a producer he has earned 75 international gold and platinum albums. His work has yielded multiple Grammys and an Oscar nomination.

== At A&M Records ==
Kershenbaum has been an executive at three major record companies. Kershenbaum's first albums at A&M Records included Joan Baez's Diamonds & Rust and the Elkie Brooks album Shooting Star. Kershenbaum signed the British musician Joe Jackson and was responsible for the production of four of his albums, including Night and Day (1982), which became the artist's most successful album, earning two Grammy nominations and a worldwide top 5 single, "Steppin' Out." Produced by Kershenbaum, Jackson's debut album Look Sharp! helped establish Jackson as a cornerstone of new wave music.

== At Elektra Records ==
Kershenbaum produced Tracy Chapman's first two albums, Tracy Chapman (1988) and Crossroads (1989), plus her fifth album, Telling Stories (2000). Chapman's debut album sold over 17 million copies and earned three Grammy awards and six nominations including "Best Producer of the Year", "Best Song of the Year", "Best New Artist", and "Best Album of the Year".

== At Capitol Records ==
Kershenbaum worked with Duran Duran on their album Rio (1982) at Capitol Records. Duran Duran had released the album on EMI in the United Kingdom and quickly attained four UK top 20 singles. Before Kershenbaum's involvement, the sales of Rio were not particularly strong in the United States, and Capitol Records (EMI's American branch) was at a loss about how to sell the band. However, after an EP of Kershenbaum's dance remixes of songs from Rio (released as Carnival) became popular with DJs during the autumn of 1982, the band arranged to have most of the album remixed by Kershenbaum. After it was re-released in the U.S. in November, with heavy promotion as a dance album, Rio begin to climb the American charts. Following the success of the Kershenbaum remixes, Capitol changed its marketing strategy on Duran Duran from New Romantic to dance band. This resulted in multi-platinum sales and the hit song "Hungry Like the Wolf". The album went gold in the US on March 1, 1983, and platinum on April 26, eventually reaching double platinum status. It peaked at number 5 on the Billboard Hot 100 in the US (on June 5, 1983), and remained on the charts for 129 weeks.

== Career as an entrepreneur ==
Kershenbaum established his own group of companies encompassing five recording studios, a film music supervision division, and a music publishing company. Under this banner, he produced and recorded many projects including a Kenny Loggins album for Sony and a platinum LP by Joshua Kadison.

As a partner and co-president of Morgan Creek Music Group, Kershenbaum acted as executive producer for the song "(Everything I Do) I Do It for You" by Bryan Adams, from the film Robin Hood: Prince of Thieves.

As a music supervisor, Kershenbaum has worked on many films. At Morgan Creek Pictures, he supervised music for many movies, including The Last of the Mohicans soundtrack, which has sold 1,800,000 copies. Other films he worked on include Bill and Ted's Excellent Adventure, Road House, Navy SEALs, White Sands, and 200 Cigarettes.
