= Crossroads (Tracy Chapman album) =

Studio album by Tracy Chapman
- Released: October 3, 1989
- Studios: Powertrax Studio, Hollywood, California
- Genres: Contemporary folk; folk rock
- Length: 42:32
- Label: Elektra
- Producers: Tracy Chapman; David Kershenbaum

Tracy Chapman chronology
Tracy Chapman (1988)	Crossroads (1989)	Matters of the Heart (1992)

Singles from Crossroads
- 1. "Crossroads" Released: 1989; 2. "All That You Have Is Your Soul" Released: 1989; 3. "Subcity" Released: 1990

Crossroads is the second studio album by American singer-songwriter Tracy Chapman, released in 1989. Chapman was also a producer on this album, the first time she had taken on such a role. The song "Freedom Now" is dedicated to Nelson Mandela.

== Track listing ==
All songs written by Tracy Chapman.

1. "Crossroads" – 4:11
2. "Bridges" – 5:24
3. "Freedom Now" – 4:02
4. "Material World" – 3:02
5. "Be Careful of My Heart" – 4:39
6. "Subcity" – 5:09
7. "Born to Fight" – 2:46
8. "A Hundred Years" – 4:20
9. "This Time" – 3:43
10. "All That You Have Is Your Soul" – 5:16

Professional ratings
Review scores
Source	Rating
AllMusic	3/5 stars
Christgau’s Consumer Guide	B
Hi-Fi News & Record Review	A*:1
NME	8/10
Rolling Stone	4/5 stars
Tom Hull	B

== Personnel ==
=== Musicians ===
- Tracy Chapman – acoustic guitar, harmonica (tracks 6, 10), electric guitar (tracks 3, 8), vocals, background vocals (track 3), 12 string guitar (tracks 6, 9), stagecoach guitar (track 10)
- Charlie Bisharat – viola (track 6), electric violin (track 6), violin pizzicato (track 1)
- Peggie Blu – background vocals (track 3)
- Marc Cohn – piano (track 2)
- Paulinho da Costa – tambourine (track 3), conga (track 8)
- Carolyn Dennis – background vocals (track 3)
- Denny Fongheiser – drums (tracks 1, 3, 4, 6, 7, 8)
- Bobbye Hall – percussion (tracks 1, 4, 5), conga (tracks 3, 6), tambourine (track 7)
- Jack Holder – banjo (track 3), piano (tracks 2, 7), acoustic stagecoach guitar (track 9), organ (track 9)
- Larry Klein – bass guitar (tracks 1, 2, 3, 4, 5, 6, 8, 9)
- Danny Kortchmar – electric guitar (track 8)
- Russ Kunkel – drums (tracks 2, 6, 9)
- Jim Lacefield – cello (track 10)
- Tim Landers – bass guitar (tracks 3, 7)
- Steve Lindley – electric piano (track 8)
- Bob Marlette – keyboards (tracks 1, 2)
- Frank Marocco – accordion (track 1)
- Sheila Minard – background vocals (track 3)
- Scarlet Rivera – violin (track 9)
- Roz Seay – background vocals (track 3)
- G.E. Smith – acoustic picking guitar (track 1), mandolin (track 5), electric guitar (track 4)
- William D. "Smitty" Smith – organ (tracks 4, 6, 8)
- John X. Volaitis – piano (track 9)
- Elesecia Wright – background vocals (track 3)
- Snooky Young – trumpet (track 7)
- Neil Young – acoustic guitar (track 10), piano (track 10)

=== Production ===
- Producers: Tracy Chapman, David Kershenbaum
- Kevin W. Smith – engineer, mixing
- Herb Ritts – cover photography

== Charts ==
=== Weekly charts ===
Chart (1989)	Peak position
Australian Albums (ARIA)	4
Austrian Albums (Ö3 Austria)	3
Dutch Albums (Album Top 100)	5
German Albums (Offizielle Top 100)	1
New Zealand Albums (RMNZ)	1
Norwegian Albums (VG-lista)	3
Spanish Albums (AFYVE)	3
Swedish Albums (Sverigetopplistan)	8
Swiss Albums (Schweizer Hitparade)	2
UK Albums (Official Charts)	1
US Billboard 200	9
US Top R&B/Hip-Hop Albums (Billboard)	72

=== Year-end charts ===
Chart (1989)	Position
Dutch Albums (Album Top 100)	40
German Albums (Offizielle Top 100)	58
New Zealand Albums (RMNZ)	1
Portugal Albums (AFP)	10
UK Albums (OCC)	53

Chart (1990)	Position
Austrian Albums (Ö3 Austria)	27
German Albums (Offizielle Top 100)	16
New Zealand Albums (RMNZ)	30
Swiss Albums (Schweizer Hitparade)	30
US Billboard 200	73

=== Singles ===
Year	Single	Chart	Position
1989	"Crossroads"	Mainstream Rock Tracks	26
1989	"Crossroads"	Modern Rock Tracks	7
1989	"Crossroads"	The Billboard Hot 100	90

== Certifications and sales ==
Region	Certification	Certified units/sales
Argentina (CAPIF)	Gold	30,000^{^}
Australia (ARIA)	2× Platinum	140,000^{^}
Austria (IFPI Austria)	Platinum	50,000^{*}
Canada (Music Canada)	Platinum	100,000^{^}
Finland (Musiikkituottajat)	Gold	30,906
France (SNEP)	Platinum	300,000^{*}
Germany (BVMI)	2× Platinum	1,000,000^{^}
Hong Kong (IFPI Hong Kong)	Gold	10,000^{*}
Italy sales in 1989	—	300,000
Netherlands (NVPI)	Gold	50,000^{^}
New Zealand (RMNZ)	Platinum	15,000^{^}
Portugal (AFP)	Gold	20,000^{^}
Spain (Promusicae)	2× Platinum	200,000^{^}
Sweden (GLF)	Gold	50,000^{^}
Switzerland (IFPI Switzerland)	2× Platinum	100,000^{^}
United Kingdom (BPI)	Platinum	300,000^{^}
United States (RIAA)	Platinum	1,000,000^{^}
^{*} Sales figures based on certification alone.^{^} Shipments figures based on certification alone.

== Awards ==
32nd Annual Grammy Awards

Grammy Awards
Year	Work	Award	Result	Ref
1990	Crossroads	Best Contemporary Folk Album	Nominated	
