= Tracy Chapman (album) =

Studio album by Tracy Chapman
- Released: April 5, 1988
- Recorded: 1987–88
- Studios: Powertrax, Hollywood, California
- Genres: Contemporary folk; folk rock; roots rock; heartland rock
- Length: 36:11
- Label: Elektra
- Producer: David Kershenbaum

Tracy Chapman chronology
Tracy Chapman (1988)	Crossroads (1989)

Singles from Tracy Chapman
- 1. "Fast Car" Released: April 6, 1988; 2. "Talkin' 'bout a Revolution" Released: July 1988; 3. "Baby Can I Hold You" Released: October 1988

Tracy Chapman is the debut album by the American singer-songwriter Tracy Chapman, released on April 5, 1988, by Elektra Records. The album was recorded at the Powertrax studio in Hollywood, California. In 1987, Chapman was discovered by fellow Tufts University student Brian Koppelman. He offered to show her work to his father, who owned a successful publishing company; however, she did not consider the offer to be serious. After multiple performances, however, Koppelman found a demo tape of her singing "Talkin' 'bout a Revolution", which he promoted to radio stations, and she was eventually signed to Elektra.

In early attempts to produce the first album, many producers turned down Chapman as they did not favor her musical direction. David Kershenbaum, however, decided to produce it as he wanted to record an acoustic music album. It was recorded in Hollywood, California, in eight weeks. Most of the writing is based on political and social causes.

Tracy Chapman quickly gained critical acclaim from a wide majority of music critics, praising the album's simplicity, Chapman's vocal ability and her political and social lyrical content. The album achieved commercial success in most of the countries it was released, making it to the top of the charts in many countries, including Austria, Canada, New Zealand, Switzerland, Denmark and the United Kingdom. It peaked at No. 1 on the US Billboard 200 and was certified six-times platinum by the Recording Industry Association of America (RIAA), with sales exceeding over six million copies in the United States alone.

Three singles were released from the album, with the most successful single being "Fast Car". The song was performed at the Nelson Mandela 70th Birthday Tribute. It rose to the top ten on the US Billboard Hot 100 and also did well in Australia, New Zealand, Ireland, the United Kingdom, and other European countries. Tracy Chapman is one of the best-selling albums of all time, with sales of over 20 million units worldwide.

In April 2025, it was inducted into National Recording Registry by the Library of Congress.

== Background ==
In 1987, Chapman was discovered by fellow Tufts University student Brian Koppelman. In an interview, Koppelman said, "I was helping organize a boycott protest against apartheid at school, and [someone] told me there was this great protest singer I should get to play at the rally." He went to see Chapman perform at a coffeehouse called Cappuccino, adding, "Tracy walked onstage, and it was like an epiphany. Her presence, her voice, her songs, her sincerity—it all came across."

After this, Koppelman told Chapman that his father, Charles Koppelman, was at the time a co-owner of SBK Publishing and that he could help her make a record. She did not consider the offer seriously.

Koppelman was still very interested in Chapman, and he attended most of her shows. Chapman finally agreed to talk to him, but she did not record any demos for him. He later discovered that she had recorded demos at the Tufts' radio station WMFO for copyright purposes in exchange for the station's right to play her music. Koppelman smuggled a demo tape of her song "Talkin' 'bout a Revolution" from the station, which he showed to his father.

According to the interview, "He immediately got the picture and flew up to see her". Her demo led to her signing a contract with Elektra Records. Chapman said, "I have to say that I never thought I would get a contract with a major record label [...] All the time since I was a kid listening to records and the radio, I didn't think there was any indication that record people would find the kind of music that I did marketable. Especially when I was singing songs like 'Talkin' 'bout a Revolution' during the Seventies [...] I didn't see a place for me there."

Producer David Kershenbaum said that the album was "made for the right reasons," adding, "There was a set of ideas that we wanted to communicate, and we felt if we were truthful and loyal to those ideas, then people would pick up on the emotion and the lyrical content that was there."

== Recording ==
Chapman immediately started writing songs when she was signed to Elektra. Koppelman started finding producers for the album with the demo tape of her single "Talkin' 'bout a Revolution". However, she was turned down, due to the popularity of dance-pop and synthpop at the time. In an interview with The Guardian in 2008, Chapman stated, "My first record was almost not my first record." After the originally chosen producer was killed in a car accident, Elektra initially selected a producer with less experience to replace him, and the recording sessions were, according to Chapman, "horrible" and "bombastic".

They then found Kershenbaum, who later recalled, "I'd been looking for something acoustic to do for some time," adding, "There was a sense in the industry of a slight boredom with everything out there and that people might be willing to listen again to lyrics and to someone who made statements." Chapman's greatest concern during her meetings with Kershenbaum was that the integrity of her songs remain intact, because she wanted to record "real simple". Kershenbaum said, "I wanted to make sure that she was in front, vocally and thematically, and that everything was built around her." Every song that was featured on the resultant studio album had been featured on her demo tape, except for "Fast Car", which was one of the last songs recorded for the album. Kershenbaum recalled that the first time she sang and performed it for him, he "loved it the minute I heard it."

The album was, in total, recorded in eight weeks at Powertrax, Kershenbaum's Hollywood studio. Interviewed in 2002 by The Guardian, Kershenbaum stated that a lot of the public wanted "what she had", adding, "And they weren't getting it. She got there at the right moment with stuff that was good." Chapman was also interviewed and talked about the background of the album, stating, "The first record [Tracy Chapman] is seen as being more social commentary... more political. But I think that's just all about perspective."

== Reception ==
Professional ratings
Review scores
Source	Rating
AllMusic	5/5 stars
Los Angeles Times	4/4 stars
NME	8/10
Orlando Sentinel	5/5 stars
The Philadelphia Inquirer	3/4 stars
Pitchfork	9.4/10
Q	4/5 stars
Rolling Stone	4/5 stars
The Rolling Stone Album Guide	4.5/5 stars
The Village Voice	B+

=== Critical ===
According to Rolling Stone, Chapman "caught everyone's ear in the hair-metal late Eighties" with the album. Robert Christgau of The Village Voice found "Fast Car" and "Mountains o' Things" very perceptive and Chapman an innately gifted singer but was disappointed by the presence of "begged questions" and "naive left-folkie truisms", such as "Talkin' 'bout a Revolution" and "Why": "She's too good for such condescension ... Get real, girl."

In a retrospective review for AllMusic, Stephen Thomas Erlewine wrote, "Arriving with little fanfare in the spring of 1988, Tracy Chapman's eponymous debut album became one of the key records of the Bush era, providing a touchstone for the entire PC movement while reviving the singer-songwriter tradition." According to Erlewine, "the juxtaposition of contemporary themes and classic production precisely is what makes the album distinctive – it brings the traditions into the present." He highlighted the album as being the best in her entire discography.

=== Commercial ===
Over three weeks after its release, the album first reached the Billboard charts for the week of April 30 at No. 122. The following week, it reached No. 77 and continued to slowly climb the charts until it reached No. 1 in the week of August 27. Her live televised performance at Wembley Stadium in June marked a shift in album sales. Prior to that performance, 250,000 copies had been sold. By June 22, it was awarded gold record status by the RIAA. By July 27, it was awarded platinum status, having sold 1,000,000 copies. Ultimately, it sold over 20 million copies worldwide and is one of the first albums by a female artist to have more than 10 million copies sold worldwide.

=== Awards ===
31st Annual Grammy Awards

Grammy Awards
Year	Work	Award	Result	Ref
1989	Tracy Chapman	Album of the Year	Nominated	
1989	Tracy Chapman	Best Contemporary Folk Album	Won	
1989	"Fast Car"	Song of the Year	Nominated	
1989	"Fast Car"	Record of the Year	Nominated	
1989	"Fast Car"	Best Female Pop Vocal Performance	Won	
1989	Tracy Chapman	Best New Artist	Won	
1989	David Kershenbaum	Producer of the Year	Nominated	

== Legacy ==
In 1989, the album was rated No. 10 on Rolling Stone magazine's list of the "100 Greatest Albums of the 80s". In 2003, the album was ranked No. 261 on Rolling Stone's list of "The 500 Greatest Albums of All Time", No. 263 in a 2012 revised list, and No. 256 in a 2020 revised list.

Slant Magazine listed the album at No. 49 on its list of "Best Albums of the 1980s".

The album was critically acclaimed and helped to revive the singer-songwriter tradition.

"Fast Car" was later recorded by country music singer Luke Combs for his 2023 album Gettin' Old, from which it was released as the second single. Combs' rendition of the song reached number one on the Billboard Country Airplay chart, making Chapman the first African-American woman to solely write a country number one. Additionally, it reached number two on the Billboard Hot 100, higher than Chapman's original version. Chapman and Combs subsequently performed the song together live at the 66th Annual Grammy Awards in Los Angeles on February 4, 2024.

In 2025, the album was inducted into National Recording Registry by the Library of Congress for being "culturally, historically, and/or aesthetically significant".

== Track listing ==
All songs written by Tracy Chapman.

No.	Title	Length
1.	"Talkin' 'bout a Revolution"	2:40
2.	"Fast Car"	4:57
3.	"Across the Lines"	3:25
4.	"Behind the Wall"	1:50
5.	"Baby Can I Hold You"	3:14
6.	"Mountains o' Things"	4:39
7.	"She's Got Her Ticket"	3:57
8.	"Why?"	2:06
9.	"For My Lover"	3:12
10.	"If Not Now…"	3:01
11.	"For You"	3:10

== Personnel ==
Credits adapted from the album's booklet.

Musicians

- Tracy Chapman – all vocals; acoustic guitar (1–3, 8–10), electric guitar (1–2, 6–7), percussion (1–2, 10), rhythm guitar (5)
- Denny Fongheiser – drums (1–3, 5, 7–10), percussion (1, 5, 8, 10)
- Larry Klein – bass guitar (1–3, 5, 7–10)
- Jack Holder – Hammond organ (1, 5, 7–8), electric guitar (1, 7–8), hammer dulcimer (3), electric sitar (5), dobro (9), acoustic piano (10)
- Ed Black – steel guitar (2, 9)
- Bob Marlette – keyboards (5–6)
- David LaFlamme – electric violin (5)
- Steve Kaplan – keyboards (6–7), synth harmonica (9)
- Paulinho da Costa – percussion (6–8)

Technical

- David Kershenbaum – producer
- Don Rubin – executive producer
- Brian Koppelman – executive producer
- Kevin W. Smith – engineer, mixing
- Carol Bobolts – art direction
- Matt Mahurin – photography

== Charts ==
=== Weekly charts ===
Chart (1988–2025)	Peak position
Argentina (CAPIF)	1
Australian Albums (ARIA)	2
Austrian Albums (Ö3 Austria)	1
Belgian Albums (Ultratop Flanders)	23
Belgian Albums (Ultratop Wallonia)	65
Canadian Albums (RPM)	1
Croatian International Albums (HDU)	5
Danish Albums (Hitlisten)	17
Dutch Albums (Album Top 100)	1
French Albums (SNEP)	27
German Albums (Offizielle Top 100)	1
Hungarian Albums (MAHASZ)	3
Italian Albums (FIMI)	55
New Zealand Albums (RMNZ)	1
Norwegian Albums (VG-lista)	2
Spanish Albums (AFYVE)	2
Swedish Albums (Sverigetopplistan)	2
Swiss Albums (Schweizer Hitparade)	1
UK Albums (Official Charts)	1
US Billboard 200	1
US Top R&B/Hip-Hop Albums (Billboard)	24

=== Year-end charts ===
Chart (1988)	Position
Australian Albums (ARIA)	7
Austrian Albums (Ö3 Austria)	13
Dutch Albums (Album Top 100)	5
German Albums (Offizielle Top 100)	6
New Zealand Albums (RMNZ)	11
Swiss Albums (Schweizer Hitparade)	6
US Billboard 200	21
US Top R&B/Hip-Hop Albums (Billboard)	100

Chart (1989)	Position
Australian Albums (ARIA)	46
Austrian Albums (Ö3 Austria)	1
Dutch Albums (Album Top 100)	91
German Albums (Offizielle Top 100)	3
New Zealand Albums (RMNZ)	27
Portugal Albums (AFP)	3
Swiss Albums (Schweizer Hitparade)	10
UK Albums (OCC)	90
US Billboard 200	41

Chart (1999)	Position
UK Albums (OCC)	66

Chart (2001)	Position
UK Albums (OCC)	169

Chart (2002)	Position
UK Albums (OCC)	173

Chart (2003)	Position
UK Albums (OCC)	199

=== All-time charts ===
Chart	Position
Irish Female Albums (IRMA)	5

== Sales and certifications ==
Region	Certification	Certified units/sales
Argentina (CAPIF)	2× Platinum	120,000^{^}
Australia (ARIA)	7× Platinum	490,000^{^}
Austria (IFPI Austria)	2× Platinum	100,000^{*}
Belgium (BRMA)	Platinum	50,000^{*}
Brazil (Pro-Música Brasil)	Platinum	250,000^{*}
Canada (Music Canada)	3× Platinum	300,000^{^}
Denmark (IFPI Danmark) sales since 2011	7× Platinum	140,000^{‡}
France (SNEP)	Diamond	1,000,000^{*}
Germany (BVMI)	9× Gold	2,250,000^{^}
Hong Kong (IFPI Hong Kong)	Platinum	20,000^{*}
India (IMI)	—	6,500
Ireland (IRMA)	9× Platinum	145,000
Italy sales 1988-1989	—	700,000
Italy (FIMI) sales since 2009	Platinum	50,000^{‡}
Netherlands (NVPI)	Platinum	100,000^{^}
New Zealand (RMNZ)	2× Platinum	30,000^{‡}
Portugal (AFP)	Platinum	40,000^{^}
Singapore	—	10,000
Spain (Promusicae)	3× Platinum	350,000
Sweden (GLF)	Gold	50,000^{^}
Switzerland (IFPI Switzerland)	4× Platinum	200,000^{^}
United Kingdom (BPI)	9× Platinum	2,668,869
United States (RIAA)	6× Platinum	6,000,000^{^}
Summaries
Worldwide	—	20,000,000
^{*} Sales figures based on certification alone.^{^} Shipments figures based on certification alone.^{‡} Sales+streaming figures based on certification alone.

== See also ==
- List of best-selling albums by women
- List of best-selling albums in Europe
- List of best-selling albums in France
- List of best-selling albums in Germany
- List of number-one albums of 1988 (U.S.)
- List of UK Albums Chart number ones of the 1980s
