= Fast Car =

1988 single by Tracy Chapman

Single by Tracy Chapman

from the album Tracy Chapman
- B-side: "For You"
- Released: April 6, 1988
- Recorded: 1987
- Genre: Folk rock; folk-pop; soft rock
- Length: 4:57 (album version); 4:26 (single version)
- Label: Elektra
- Songwriter: Tracy Chapman
- Producer: David Kershenbaum

Tracy Chapman singles chronology
"Fast Car" (1988)	"Talkin' 'bout a Revolution" (1988)

Music video
- "Fast Car" on YouTube

Audio sample
- "Fast Car": file; help

"Fast Car" is a song by American singer-songwriter Tracy Chapman, released as her debut single on April 6, 1988, by Elektra Records. It served as the lead single from her 1988 self-titled debut studio album. Chapman's appearance at the Nelson Mandela 70th Birthday Tribute concert in June 1988 helped the song become a top-ten hit in the United States, reaching number six on the Billboard Hot 100 and led the album to top the Billboard 200. The single also reached number five on the UK Singles Chart and topped the charts of five other countries.

"Fast Car" received three nominations at the 31st Annual Grammy Awards in 1989: Record of the Year, Song of the Year, and Best Female Pop Vocal Performance, the last of which it won. It also received an MTV Video Music Award nomination for Best Female Video.

Since the release of Chapman's original, the song has had success in two electronic dance versions by Swedish DJ Tobtok and British DJ Jonas Blue, as well as a country cover by American singer Luke Combs. Combs's version was a number-one single on the Billboard Hot Country Songs and Country Airplay charts in 2023, and won Chapman the Country Music Association Award for Song of the Year, making her the first black person to win the award.

== Music and lyrics ==
According to Metro Weekly critic Chris Gerard, "Fast Car" tells the story of a working woman trying to escape the cycle of poverty, set to "glowing folk rock". In a 2010 interview, Chapman explained that the song wasn't "directly autobiographical," but rather "very generally represents the world that I saw it when I was growing up in Cleveland, Ohio, coming from a working class background."

I’ve been raised by a single mom, I was just watching people, being in a community of people who were struggling. So everyone was really just, one, working hard, two, hoping that things would get better. In part everything that a person writes is autobiographical but the songs are directly so, and most of them were not and Fast Car wasn't one that was directly autobiographical. I never had a Fast Car, it’s just a story about a couple, how they are trying to make a life together and they face challenges.

The song's arrangement was described by Orlando Sentinel writer Thom Duffy as "subtle folk-rock", while Billboard magazine's Gary Trust deemed the record a "folk/pop" song. Critic Dave Marsh called it an "optimistic folk-rock narrative" about characters living in a homeless shelter.

== Release and promotion ==
Elektra Records released "Fast Car" as a single on April 6, 1988, one day after the album Tracy Chapman. That June, Chapman appeared at the Nelson Mandela 70th Birthday Tribute concert, where she was scheduled to sing three songs. Just before surprise guest Stevie Wonder walked onstage, he learned that his keyboard's floppy disk had gone missing. He left in a panic, forcing the event organizers to usher Chapman back to the stage with nothing but a microphone and her guitar. As the organizers readied the stage for the following act, Chapman performed "Fast Car" and "Across the Lines". This performance brought widespread attention to her music, with sales for Tracy Chapman increasing enough for it to top the Billboard 200 chart on August 27, 1988. "Fast Car" itself would reach number six on the Billboard Hot 100 the same week.

A remastered recording of "Fast Car" was issued by Elektra in 2015. The song reached one billion streams on Spotify on January 17, 2025.

== Critical reception ==
John Tague from NME wrote, "'Fast Car' is a typically well expressed lament, not for those who have suffered extraordinary circumstances, but for those who escape one form of dead end existence only to fall into another, relative material success without the consolation of dreams for the future. It's a keenly felt depiction of the impossibility of escape, rendered tastefully and gracefully, charming in its simplicity." Rolling Stone ranked "Fast Car" number 167 on their 2004 list of the 500 Greatest Songs of All Time. It was Chapman's only song on the list, and the highest-ranking song performed and written solely by a female artist. When Rolling Stone updated the list in 2021, "Fast Car" was promoted to number 71. Pitchfork named it the 86th-best song of the 1980s in 2015. Billboard magazine ranked "Fast Car" number 15 in their list of "The 100 Greatest LGBTQ+ Anthems of All Time" in 2025. In June 2026, CBS News included the song in its list of the 250 essential American songs of the past 250 years, one of two Chapman songs to make the list.

== Renewed British success ==
In April 2011, "Fast Car" entered the UK top ten for the second time at number four after Michael Collings performed it on Britain's Got Talent, one position higher than its initial chart success in 1988. The single was certified quintuple platinum in the United Kingdom by the British Phonographic Industry (BPI) in 2026, based on downloads and streaming. By 2016, it had sold 661,500 copies in the United Kingdom.

== Personnel ==
- Tracy Chapman – vocals, acoustic guitar, electric guitar, percussion
- Denny Fongheiser – drums
- Larry Klein – bass guitar
- Ed Black – pedal steel guitar

== Charts ==
=== Weekly charts ===
1988 weekly chart performance for "Fast Car" by Tracy Chapman
Chart (1988)	Peak position
Australia (ARIA)	4
Belgium (Ultratop 50 Flanders)	1
Canada Top Singles (RPM)	1
Canada Adult Contemporary (RPM)	5
Europe (Eurochart Hot 100)	13
Ireland (IRMA)	1
Italy Airplay (Music & Media)	5
Netherlands (Dutch Top 40)	1
Netherlands (Single Top 100)	2
New Zealand (Recorded Music NZ)	21
Portugal (AFP)	1
Sweden (Sverigetopplistan)	9
UK Singles (Official Charts)	5
Uruguay (UPI)	4
US Billboard Hot 100	6
US Adult Contemporary (Billboard)	7
US Mainstream Rock (Billboard)	19
US Cash Box Top 100	4

2011 weekly chart performance for "Fast Car" by Tracy Chapman
Chart (2011)	Peak position
UK Singles (OCC)	4

2013 weekly chart performance for "Fast Car" by Tracy Chapman
Chart (2013)	Peak position
Denmark (Tracklisten)	29
Germany (GfK)	81

2022 weekly chart performance for "Fast Car" by Tracy Chapman
Chart (2022)	Peak position
South Africa Radio (RISA)	40

2023 weekly chart performance for "Fast Car" by Tracy Chapman
Chart (2023)	Peak position
US Hot Rock & Alternative Songs (Billboard)	16

2024 weekly chart performance for "Fast Car" by Tracy Chapman
Chart (2024)	Peak position
Canada Hot 100 (Billboard)	37
Global 200 (Billboard)	44
US Digital Song Sales (Billboard)	1
US Billboard Hot 100	42
US Hot Rock & Alternative Songs (Billboard)	5

=== Year-end charts ===
1988 year-end chart performance for "Fast Car" by Tracy Chapman
Chart (1988)	Position
Australia (ARIA)	44
Belgium (Ultratop 50 Flanders)	15
Canada Top Singles (RPM)	18
Netherlands (Dutch Top 40)	9
Netherlands (Single Top 100)	17
UK Singles (OCC)	87
US Billboard Hot 100	76

2011 year-end chart performance for "Fast Car" by Tracy Chapman
Chart (2011)	Position
UK Singles (OCC)	78

== Certifications ==
Certifications for "Fast Car" by Tracy Chapman
Region	Certification	Certified units/sales
Canada (Music Canada)	8× Platinum	640,000^{‡}
Denmark (IFPI Danmark)	3× Platinum	270,000^{‡}
Italy (FIMI)	Platinum	50,000^{‡}
New Zealand (RMNZ)	8× Platinum	240,000^{‡}
Spain (Promusicae)	Platinum	60,000^{‡}
United Kingdom (BPI)	5× Platinum	3,000,000^{‡}
^{‡} Sales+streaming figures based on certification alone.

== Tobtok version ==
"Fast Car"

Single by Tobtok featuring River
- Released: October 30, 2015
- Genre: Tropical house
- Length: 3:27
- Label: Good Soldier
- Songwriter: Tracy Chapman
- Producer: Tobtok

In 2015, a tropical house version was released by Swedish record producer Tobtok, featuring vocals from British singer River. Tobtok's version was published on SoundCloud on October 30, 2015, and released commercially on November 27, 2015, through Good Soldier Records, and subsequently licensed to Neon Records in Australia and Disco:wax in the United States. Tobtok also released an accompanying music video. Although the Jonas Blue version released shortly after was far more successful, Tobtok's version also charted in a number of charts, notably Australia, where it received significant airplay (some stations like 2Day FM played it over the Jonas Blue version) and reached number 19 on the ARIA Singles Chart in January 2016, while Jonas Blue's version was at number two. The Tobtok version also charted in the Norwegian VG-lista, Irish IRMA, and Danish Tracklisten charts.

Track listing

1. "Fast Car" – 3:27
2. "Fast Car" (L'Tric remix radio edit) – 2:57

=== Charts ===
Chart performance for "Fast Car" by Tobtok
Chart (2016)	Peak position
Australia (ARIA)	19
Denmark (Tracklisten)	29
Ireland (IRMA)	25
Norway (VG-lista)	32
Poland Airplay (ZPAV)	15
Poland (Video Chart)	3

=== Certifications ===
Certifications for "Fast Car" by Tobtok
Region	Certification	Certified units/sales
Australia (ARIA)	Platinum	70,000^{‡}
Denmark (IFPI Danmark)	Gold	45,000^{‡}
^{‡} Sales+streaming figures based on certification alone.

== Jonas Blue version ==
"Fast Car"

Single by Jonas Blue featuring Dakota

from the album Blue
- Released: December 4, 2015
- Recorded: 2015
- Genre: Tropical house; EDM
- Length: 3:32
- Label: Capitol; Positiva; Virgin EMI
- Songwriter: Tracy Chapman
- Producer: Jonas Blue

Jonas Blue singles chronology
"Fast Car" (2015)	"Perfect Strangers" (2016)

Dakota singles chronology
"Fast Car" (2015)	"Dreams" (2017)

Music video
- "Fast Car" on YouTube

In 2015, a tropical house cover of "Fast Car" was released by British DJ and record producer Jonas Blue. It is Blue's debut single and features the vocals from British singer Dakota; it is also her debut single. It is the lead single of Blue's debut album Blue (2018). The Club Mix was included on Blue's compilation, Jonas Blue: Electronic Nature – The Mix 2017.

=== Background and inspiration ===
In an interview with iHeartRadio, Blue stated Chapman's original 1988 hit is a favorite of his mother, who would often play it in the car. "It was a good song in London [during] that time when I was growing up, so it was always on the radio," he went on to say. "And it just kind of stuck with me. It was that song on the long journeys, and I loved it."

Regarding Dakota, who provides vocals on the song, Blue said, "... she [said], 'Oh, I've never done dance music before or anything like that so, I'm not kind of sure.' And I was like, 'Listen, you'd be great.' And she came the next day to record it, and what you hear on the radio is her coming in the next day after her show to record it." Blue also admitted that he wanted to create a Swedish-esque sound on the record: "I think with things like the synth lead lines in it, giving it that second hook, I was kind of going for a very kind of Swedish-y kind of sound. That's kind of the influence behind that kind of lead synth line, and that was something which I don't think people have picked up on yet, but they just like the song because of what it is."

=== Composition ===
Jonas Blue's version of "Fast Car" is performed in the key of A major with a tempo of 114 beats per minute in common time, with Dakota's vocals ranging from E_{3} to F♯_{4}.

=== Chart performance ===
The Jonas Blue version peaked at number two on the UK Singles Chart, behind Zayn Malik's "Pillowtalk". Its UK peak meant it charted higher than Chapman's original, which peaked at number five on the chart in May 1988 and a position higher upon a re-release in April 2011.

Outside the United Kingdom, the Jonas Blue version reached number one in Australia and Hungary, while peaking within the top ten in Germany, Ireland, Italy, the Netherlands, Belgium, New Zealand, and Sweden. In the United States, the Jonas Blue version went to number one on Dance Club Songs.

It reached one billion streams on Spotify in late February 2023.

=== Track listing ===
Digital download – radio edit
No.	Title	Length
1.	"Fast Car" (featuring Dakota; radio edit)	3:32

Digital download – remixes
No.	Title	Length
1.	"Fast Car" (featuring Dakota; Club mix)	5:30
2.	"Fast Car" (featuring Dakota; Grant Nelson remix)	6:02
3.	"Fast Car" (featuring Dakota; Rare Candy remix)	5:42
4.	"Fast Car" (featuring Dakota; Daddy's Groove remix)	5:23
5.	"Fast Car" (featuring Dakota; Steve Smart remix)	4:58

Digital download – acoustic version
No.	Title	Length
1.	"Fast Car" (featuring Dakota; acoustic)	3:37

=== Charts ===
==== Weekly charts ====
Weekly chart performance for "Fast Car" by Jonas Blue
Chart (2015–2016)	Peak position
Australia (ARIA)	1
Austria (Ö3 Austria Top 40)	3
Belgium (Ultratop 50 Flanders)	3
Belgium (Ultratop 50 Wallonia)	7
Canada Hot 100 (Billboard)	27
CIS Airplay (TopHit)	180
Czech Republic Airplay (ČNS IFPI)	3
Czech Republic Singles Digital (ČNS IFPI)	4
Denmark (Tracklisten)	6
Finland (Suomen virallinen lista)	10
France (SNEP)	14
Germany (GfK)	2
Hungary (Dance Top 40)	10
Hungary (Rádiós Top 40)	1
Hungary (Single Top 40)	1
Hungary (Stream Top 40)	1
Ireland (IRMA)	2
Italy (FIMI)	5
Latvia (Latvijas Top 40)	1
Lebanon (Lebanese Top 20)	11
Mexico Airplay (Billboard)	5
Netherlands (Dutch Top 40)	3
Netherlands (Single Top 100)	3
New Zealand (Recorded Music NZ)	2
Norway (VG-lista)	9
Poland Airplay (ZPAV)	30
Russia Airplay (TopHit)	171
Scottish Singles Sales (Official Charts)	1
Slovakia Airplay (ČNS IFPI)	6
Slovakia Singles Digital (ČNS IFPI)	3
Slovenia Airplay (SloTop50)	8
Spain (Promusicae)	18
Sweden (Sverigetopplistan)	2
Switzerland (Schweizer Hitparade)	4
Ukraine Airplay (TopHit)	115
UK Singles (Official Charts)	2
UK Dance (Official Charts)	1
US Billboard Hot 100	98
US Hot Dance/Electronic Songs (Billboard)	7
US Dance Club Songs (Billboard)	1

==== Year-end charts ====
Year-end chart performance for "Fast Car" by Jonas Blue
Chart (2016)	Position
Argentina (Monitor Latino)	71
Australia (ARIA)	12
Austria (Ö3 Austria Top 40)	15
Belgium (Ultratop Flanders)	14
Belgium (Ultratop Wallonia)	34
Canada (Canadian Hot 100)	84
Denmark (Tracklisten)	23
France (SNEP)	33
Germany (Official German Charts)	13
Hungary (Dance Top 40)	29
Hungary (Rádiós Top 40)	9
Hungary (Single Top 40)	10
Italy (FIMI)	14
Netherlands (Dutch Top 40)	15
Netherlands (Single Top 100)	6
New Zealand (Recorded Music NZ)	9
Spain (PROMUSICAE)	46
Sweden (Sverigetopplistan)	8
Switzerland (Schweizer Hitparade)	15
UK Singles (Official Charts Company)	13
US Dance Club Songs (Billboard)	42
US Hot Dance/Electronic Songs (Billboard)	18

=== Certifications ===
Certifications for "Fast Car" by Jonas Blue
Region	Certification	Certified units/sales
Australia (ARIA)	9× Platinum	630,000^{‡}
Austria (IFPI Austria)	Platinum	30,000^{‡}
Belgium (BRMA)	2× Platinum	40,000^{‡}
Brazil (Pro-Música Brasil)	Diamond	250,000^{‡}
Canada (Music Canada)	2× Platinum	160,000^{‡}
Denmark (IFPI Danmark)	3× Platinum	270,000^{‡}
Germany (BVMI)	3× Gold	600,000^{‡}
Italy (FIMI)	5× Platinum	250,000^{‡}
Mexico (AMPROFON)	2× Platinum+Gold	150,000^{‡}
Netherlands (NVPI)	5× Platinum	150,000^{‡}
New Zealand (RMNZ)	5× Platinum	150,000^{‡}
Poland (ZPAV)	4× Platinum	80,000^{‡}
Portugal (AFP)	Platinum	10,000^{‡}
Spain (Promusicae)	2× Platinum	120,000^{‡}
Sweden (GLF)	6× Platinum	240,000^{‡}
United Kingdom (BPI)	3× Platinum	1,800,000^{‡}
United States (RIAA)	Platinum	1,000,000^{‡}
^{‡} Sales+streaming figures based on certification alone.

== Luke Combs version ==
"Fast Car"

Single by Luke Combs

from the album Gettin' Old
- Released: April 18, 2023
- Genre: Country; country pop; folk rock
- Length: 4:25
- Label: Columbia Nashville
- Songwriter: Tracy Chapman
- Producers: Chip Matthews; Jonathan Singleton

Luke Combs singles chronology
"Love You Anyway" (2023)	"Fast Car" (2023)	"Different 'Round Here" (2023)

American country music artist Luke Combs released a version of the song on his 2023 album Gettin' Old. It was sent to American Top 40 and adult contemporary radio as the second single from the album, marking the first time that Combs has had a song sent to contemporary hit radio, as well as his first single that he did not write or co-write.

Combs stated "Fast Car" was a personal favorite which he admired from childhood, and called it "one of the best songs of all time". His version uses most of Chapman's original lyrics, including the line "I work in the market as a checkout girl". Combs' manager Chris Kappy told Billboard magazine, "Luke is a songwriter too and Tracy is one of his favorite artists. So his goal was to never change the song. His goal was to honor the perfection that it is, and changing the gender never crossed his mind."

In a July 2023 interview with Billboard, Chapman spoke favorably of Combs and his rendition of "Fast Car", stating: "I never expected to find myself on the country charts, but I'm honored to be there. I'm happy for Luke and his success and grateful that new fans have found and embraced 'Fast Car.'" According to Billboard, Chapman earned about $500,000 in publishing royalties in the first few months after the release of Combs' version.

When Combs' version of "Fast Car" hit number one on the Country Airplay chart in July 2023, Chapman became the first black woman to score a country number one with a solo composition. At the 57th Annual Country Music Association Awards in November 2023, Chapman notably became the first Black woman or Black songwriter to ever win a CMA Award, winning Song of the Year. In February 2024, Chapman performed the song with Combs at the 66th Annual Grammy Awards, in her first televised live performance in nine years.

=== Accolades ===
Awards and nominations for "Fast Car"
Year	Organization	Award	Result	Ref.
2023	MTV Video Music Awards	Song of Summer	Nominated	
2023	Country Music Association Awards	Single of the Year	Won	
2023	Country Music Association Awards	Song of the Year	Won	
2023	Grammy Awards	Best Country Solo Performance	Nominated	

=== Commercial performance ===
Combs' version of "Fast Car" became a smash hit on radio, reaching number two on the Billboard Hot 100, higher than Chapman's original version, and on the Canadian Hot 100, tying it with "Forever After All" as Combs' highest-charting single on the former. On the Billboard Hot 100 chart dated August 5, 2023, it sat at number three, behind Jason Aldean's "Try That in a Small Town" and Morgan Wallen's "Last Night" at one and two, making it the first time in that chart's history that the top three positions were all occupied by country artists.

The song reached number one on the Country Airplay chart in July 2023, making Chapman the first black woman to score a country number one with a solo composition. Additionally, it became the first cover of a pop single to top a Billboard chart based on country radio airplay since Blake Shelton's version of Michael Bublé's 2005 single "Home" reached number one in 2008. On the Country Airplay chart dated September 9, 2023, it held the number two position behind Combs' own "Love You Anyway" at the top, making it the first time in that chart's history that the top two positions were simultaneously occupied by the same artist with no accompanying performers, and only the second time that such a distinction has been achieved by any act overall (with or without accompanying performers).

=== Charts ===
==== Weekly charts ====
Chart performance for "Fast Car" by Luke Combs
Chart (2023–2024)	Peak position
Australia (ARIA)	2
Belgium (Ultratop 50 Flanders)	13
Belgium (Ultratop 50 Wallonia)	36
Canada Hot 100 (Billboard)	2
Canada AC (Billboard)	4
Canada CHR/Top 40 (Billboard)	14
Canada Country (Billboard)	1
Canada Hot AC (Billboard)	4
Global 200 (Billboard)	18
Ireland (IRMA)	16
Netherlands (Dutch Top 40)	13
Netherlands (Single Top 100)	38
New Zealand (Recorded Music NZ)	8
Sweden (Sverigetopplistan)	66
UK Singles (Official Charts)	30
US Billboard Hot 100	2
US Adult Contemporary (Billboard)	3
US Adult Pop Airplay (Billboard)	1
US Country Airplay (Billboard)	1
US Hot Country Songs (Billboard)	1
US Pop Airplay (Billboard)	7

==== Year-end charts ====
2023 year-end chart performance for "Fast Car"
Chart (2023)	Position
Australia (ARIA)	13
Belgium (Ultratop 50 Flanders)	93
Canada (Canadian Hot 100)	9
Global 200 (Billboard)	58
Netherlands (Dutch Top 40)	71
New Zealand (Recorded Music NZ)	38
US Billboard Hot 100	8
US Adult Contemporary (Billboard)	10
US Adult Top 40 (Billboard)	10
US Country Airplay (Billboard)	4
US Hot Country Songs (Billboard)	2
US Mainstream Top 40 (Billboard)	24

2024 year-end chart performance for "Fast Car"
Chart (2024)	Position
Australia (ARIA)	30
Canada (Canadian Hot 100)	37
Global 200 (Billboard)	69
New Zealand (Recorded Music NZ)	44
US Billboard Hot 100	23
US Adult Contemporary (Billboard)	3
US Adult Top 40 (Billboard)	26
US Hot Country Songs (Billboard)	6

2025 year-end chart performance for "Fast Car"
Chart (2025)	Position
Australia (ARIA)	84
US Adult Contemporary (Billboard)	33

=== Certifications ===
Certifications for "Fast Car" by Luke Combs
Region	Certification	Certified units/sales
Australia (ARIA)	6× Platinum	420,000^{‡}
Canada (Music Canada)	7× Platinum	560,000^{‡}
Denmark (IFPI Danmark)	Gold	45,000^{‡}
New Zealand (RMNZ)	3× Platinum	90,000^{‡}
United Kingdom (BPI)	Platinum	600,000^{‡}
United States (RIAA)	8× Platinum	8,000,000^{‡}
^{‡} Sales+streaming figures based on certification alone.

== Other notable versions ==
- The initial version of the song "Dreams" by Gabrielle was based around a sample of "Fast Car", but this was removed from the final version because the sample could not be cleared.
- American musician Jim O'Rourke performed a 33-minute long rendition of "Fast Car" in Tokyo in 2002.
- American experimental rock band Xiu Xiu performed a cover of "Fast Car" with some altered lyrics on their 2003 album A Promise, with singer Jamie Stewart calling it "hugely, hugely, tremendously influential on our songwriting".
- American band Boyce Avenue covered the song in 2010, with the YouTube video reaching over 86 million views.
- Several musicians have covered the song during performances on BBC Radio 1's In the Live Lounge: Canadian musician Justin Bieber, as well as British musician Sam Smith in 2016, and American singer Khalid in 2018.
- British musician Passenger covered the song in 2017.
- American band Black Pumas performed the song live on The Late Show with Stephen Colbert in 2020, and a studio version was included in the deluxe reissue of their self-titled debut album.
- American band !!! covered the song in 2021, speeding it up significantly, with frontman Nic Offer saying "The goal was to make ‘Fast Car’ sound even faster... Something you would play in a fast fucking car."

== See also ==
- List of number-one singles of 2016 (Australia)
- List of number-one dance singles of 2016 (U.S.)
