= The Innocence Mission discography =

- Studio albums: 13
- Extended plays: 6
- Soundtrack albums: 3
- Compilation albums: 2
- Tribute albums: 1
- Singles: 20
- B-sides: 13
- Music videos: 13

The discography of American alternative rock band The Innocence Mission consists of thirteen studio albums, two compilation album, two releases issued for free download, five EPs, seventeen singles, ten music videos, and numerous appearances on soundtrack, tribute and sampler albums. The band have had their songs included on over a hundred different compilations and soundtracks, with many of those including the same select few songs (namely "Bright as Yellow", "The Lakes of Canada", "Tomorrow on the Runway" and "What a Wonderful World"). Therefore, only compilations and soundtracks which featured exclusive or otherwise rare content have been included. Also included on this list are their various solo albums and collaborations with other recording artists.

== Albums ==
=== Studio albums ===
List of studio albums with selected chart positions
| Title | Details | Peak chart positions | | | | |
| Title | Details | US | US Indie | US Heat | UK Indie | UK Ameri. |
|---|---|---|---|---|---|---|
| The Innocence Mission | Released: August 29, 1989; Label: A&M Records; Formats: LP · Cassette · CD | 167 | — | — | — | — |
| Umbrella | Released: July 23, 1991; Label: A&M Records; Formats: CD · Cassette · LP | — | — | — | — | — |
| Glow | Released: June 6, 1995; Label: A&M Records; Formats: CD · Cassette | — | — | — | — | — |
| Birds of My Neighborhood | Released: August 10, 1999; Label: Kneeling Elephant · RCA; Formats: CD | — | — | — | — | — |
| Small Planes | Released: September 25, 2001; Label: What Are Records?; Formats: CD | — | — | — | — | — |
| Befriended | Released: September 2, 2003; Label: Badman Recording Co.; Formats: CD · LP · DL | — | — | — | — | — |
| Now the Day Is Over | Released: November 9, 2004; Label: Badman Recording Co.; Formats: CD · DL | — | — | — | — | — |
| We Walked in Song | Released: March 13, 2007; Label: Badman Recording Co.; Formats: CD · LP · DL | — | 177 | — | — | — |
| My Room in the Trees | Released: July 13, 2010; Label: Badman Recording Co.; Formats: CD · LP · DL | — | — | 42 | — | — |
| Hello I Feel the Same | Released: October 16, 2015; Label: Korda Records; Formats: CD · LP · DL | — | — | — | — | — |
| Sun on the Square | Released: June 29, 2018; Label: Badman Recording Co. · Bella Union; Formats: CD · LP · DL | — | — | — | 45 | 9 |
| See You Tomorrow | Released: January 17, 2020; Label: Bella Union · Thérèse Records; Formats: CD · LP · DL | — | — | — | — | 8 |
| Midwinter Swimmers | Released: November 29, 2024; Label: Bella Union · Thérèse Records; Formats: CD · LP · DL | — | — | — | — | — |
"—" denotes an album which did not chart or was ineligible to chart.

=== Compilations ===
List of compilations with additional information
| Title | Details | Further information |
|---|---|---|
| 為に・クワイエット・コーナ (For Quiet Corner) | Released: November 25, 2015; Label: P-Vine Records; Formats: CD; Japanese-only release; Compiled by Youki Yamamoto; Catalog #: PCD–93974 | Track listing: 1. "Gentle the Rain at Home"; 2. "Sunshine Roof"; 3. "Happy Birthday"; 4. "Glimmer"^{[a]}; 5. "The Leaves Lift High"; 6. "Brotherhood of Man"; 7. "Colors of the World"; 8. "Holiday Beach"^{[a]}; 9. "Over the Rainbow"; 10. "ElectroStar"^{[a]}; 11. "Edelweiss"; 12. "We Wake Up in the Earliest Blue of All"; 13. "Song for a New Day"^{[b]}; 14. "After the Fair"^{[a]}; 15. "No Storms Come"; 16. "Pascal's Evening Song"^{[b]}; 17. "Stay Awake"; 18. "PennyLand"^{[a]}; 19. "Moon River"; 20. "When Mac Was Swimming"; 21. "I Have Loved You"; 22. "Landscape with Birds"^{[b]}; 23. "What a Wonderful World"; 24. "It Is Well with My Soul" |
| Geranium Lake: Live Performances, Demos and Unreleased Songs from Glow | Released: October 22, 2022; Formats: CD · LP | Track listing: 1. "The Forests and the Seas" (Keppel Building 1997); 2. "Keeping Awake" (Demo); 3. "Speak Our Minds" (Demo); 4. "That Was Another Country" (Live from Cleveland OH); 5. "Day by Day" (Live from the Tin Angel, Philadelphia PA); 6. "Spinning" (Demo); 7. "I Hear You Say So" (Live from Troubadour, Los Angeles CA); 8. "Bright as Yellow" (Demo); 9. "Geranium Lake" (Alternate Version); 10. "Film for My Sister"; 11. "Our Harry" (Live from the Tin Angel, Philadelphia PA); 12. "Brave" (Live from Borders, San Francisco); 13. "Everything's Different Now" (Live from Borders, Los Angeles); 14. "Goodnight, Margaret Wissler" (New Orleans 1995) |

=== Solo albums ===
List of albums recorded by individual members of The Innocence Mission, with additional information
| Title | Details | Further information |
|---|---|---|
| Painting in the Rain | Artist: Super Genius; Released: 1995; Label: Independent; Formats: CD | An album independently released by former A Thousand Years guitarist Tim Kwiat, on which Mike Bitts and Steve Brown perform bass guitar and drums, respectively, on every track on the album.; Track listing: 1. "My Old Girlfriend"; 2. "Painting in the Rain"; 3. "Spending Time with You"; 4. "Save Me"; 5. "Let You Down"; 6. "Every Time I See Her"; 7. "Dark Days"; 8. "I Am Everywhere"; 9. "Sad Oak Trees"; 10. "My Back Yard"; 11. "Thousands and Millions" |
| Ten Silver Slide Trombones | Released: January 16, 2001; Label: Umbrella Day Music; Formats: CD; Catalog #: UD-CD-01 | Originally released via donperis.com; reissued in 2020.; Track listing: 1. "Spin"; 2. "Firefly"; 3. "Catherine-Anne"; 4. "Your Friend"; 5. "Butterfly"; 6. "Ten Silver Slide Trombones"; 7. "Anytime at All"; 8. "Help Me Out"; 9. "Banjos and Trampolines"; 10. "Pennsylvania"; 11. "Clement"; 12. "Far or Near" |
| Go When the Morning Shineth | Released: May 23, 2006; Label: Jemez Mountain; Formats: CD · DL; Catalog #: JMD–944 | An album of instrumental compositions, with the exception of "North Atlantic Sand" featuring Karen Peris, and "Young as You Feel" which features Denison Witmer.; Track listing: 1. "Day Trip"; 2. "Jubilee"; 3. "Delaware"; 4. "Glimmer"; 5. "Recital"; 6. "Ribbon of Highway"; 7. "Walnut Street Rectory"; 8. "North Atlantic Sand" (with Karen Peris); 9. "Ravel Pavane"; 10. "Flyer"; 11. "Darkness Cannot Overcome the Light"; 12. "Young as You Feel" (with Denison Witmer); 13. "Blink"; 14. "After the Fair" |
| Brighter Visions Beam Afar | Released: November 24, 2007; Label: Umbrella Day Music; Formats: CD · DL; Catalog #: LCD–003 | An album of instrumental Christmas carols and classical compositions; a portion of the proceeds raised from sales of this record were donated to hunger relief charities.; Track listing: 1. "Angels We Have Heard on High"; 2. "Lo, How a Rose"; 3. "What Child Is This?"; 4. "Für Elise"; 5. "Christmas Time Is Here"; 6. "Away in a Manger"; 7. "O Christmas Tree"; 8. "O Come, All Ye Faithful"; 9. "Jesu, Joy of Man's Desiring"; 10. "O Little Town of Bethlehem"; 11. "Little Drummer Boy"; 12. "O Sanctissima"; 13. "Going Home"; 14. "It Came Upon a Midnight Clear"; 15. "Silent Night" |
| Violet | Released: December 6, 2012; Label: Umbrella Day Music; Formats: CD · DL; Catalog #: LCD–005 | Track listing: 1. "Song for a New Day"; 2. "Pascal's Evening Song" (Instrumental); 3. "Wales Because the Sun Would Shine" (Instrumental); 4. "Violet"; 5. "Julie and the Universe" (Instrumental); 6. "Procession" (Instrumental); 7. "Sweet William"; 8. "The Blue Rooftops" (Instrumental); 9. "Rowing Across" (Instrumental); 10. "Landscape with Birds"; 11. "First Days in the City" (Instrumental) (Japanese bonus track); 12. "Getting Here" (Japanese bonus track) |
| The Old Century | Released: May 1, 2013; Label: Jemez Mountain; Formats: CD · DL; Catalog #: JMD–917 | An album of instrumental compositions; Track listing: 1. "ElectroStar"; 2. "The Old Century"; 3. "Pennyland"; 4. "Concertina"; 5. "Palos Verdes"; 6. "Catalonia"; 7. "Flight"; 8. "History in G Minor"; 9. "Holiday Beach"; 10. "Speedwell Forge"; 11. "Marisol"; 12. "Operadio"; 13. "Swansea"; 14. "Ranger"; 15. "Bicycling" |
| A Song Is Way Above the Lawn | Released: October 8, 2021; Label: Bella Union; Formats: CD · LP · DL; Catalog #: BELLA–1246 | Track listing: 1. "Superhero"; 2. "To the Library"; 3. "I Would Sing Along"; 4. "For a Giraffe"; 5. "This Is a Song in Wintertime"; 6. "Map for the Orange Daylight"; 7. "Sister Birds"; 8. "George in the Car"; 9. "A Song Is Way Above the Lawn"; 10. "Flowers" |

- = Mike Bitts and Steve Brown
- = Don Peris
- = Karen Peris

== EPs ==
List of EPs with additional information
| Title | Details | Further information |
|---|---|---|
| Tending the Rose Garden | Released: 1986; Label: LList Records; Formats: Cassette · LP; Catalog #: 602020X | Limited to 1,000 copies.; Track listing: 1. "Can't Anybody Stay Together"; 2. "Trust"; 3. "Do As the Living Do"; 4. "Shadows"; 5. "Small Town Blues" |
| The Lakes of Canada | Released: 1999; Label: Kneeling Elephant; Formats: CD; Catalog #: RDJ65808–2 | This release was mailed free of charge to anyone who requested a copy on Kneeling Elephant's website, in promotion of the Birds of My Neighborhood album. Limited quantities were reissued by the band's own Umbrella Day Music label in 2007 and given as a free gift with pre-orders of the We Walked In Song vinyl.; Track listing: 1. "The Lakes of Canada"; 2. "Snow"; 3. "Moon River"; 4. "Prayer of St. Francis"; 5. "Snow (GusGus Remix)" |
| Christ Is My Hope | Released: April 10, 2000; Label: Umbrella Day Music; Formats: CD; Catalog #: LCD–001 | A collection of traditional hymns and folk songs, as well as three original recordings. All proceeds from sales of this record are donated to local Lancaster-based food banks, and UNICEF's World Food Programme. |
| Street Map | Released: December 3, 2008; Label: Umbrella Day Music; Formats: CD · DL; Catalog #: LCD–004 | Contains seven previously unreleased recordings, and "A Thousand Miles" from the 2000 compilation Evensong.; Track listing: 1. "From a Homeland"; 2. "Sunshine Roof"; 3. "Pioneering"; 4. "We Wake Up in the Earliest Blue of All"; 5. "A Thousand Miles"; 6. "Fair Hill"; 7. "You Draw the Streets of Rome"; 8. "Suitcase Waltz" |
| The Snow on Pi Day | Released: November 14, 2017; Label: Umbrella Day Music; Formats: CD · Cassette · DL; Catalog #: LCD–006 | Four new recordings, including a new version of "Snow" from Birds of My Neighborhood.; Track listing: 1. "From the Trains"; 2. "Snow"; 3. "Montreal"; 4. "The Snow on Pi Day" |
| The Raindrop Cars | Released: July 9, 2025; Label: Thérèse Records; Formats: CD · DL; Catalog #: TR–08 2025 | An 8-song companion EP to Midwinter Swimmers, containing five outtakes from the album and three alternate versions.; Track listing: 1. "St. Paul"; 2. "A Different Day (Second Version)"; 3. "At Sea"; 4. "Lines"; 5. "Sisters and Brothers (Live Radio Broadcast)"; 6. "John Williams (Earliest Version)"; 7. "Moving Around"; 8. "The Raindrop Cars" |

== Singles ==
| Title | Year | Peak chart positions | | Album |
| Title | Year | US | US Alt. | Album |
|---|---|---|---|---|
| "Black Sheep Wall" | 1989 | — | 22 | The Innocence Mission |
| "Wonder of Birds" | 1989 | — | — | The Innocence Mission |
| "I Remember Me" | 1990 | — | — | The Innocence Mission |
| "Sorry and Glad Together" | 1991 | — | — | Umbrella |
| "Bright as Yellow" | 1995 | 117 | 33 | Glow |
| "One for Sorrow, Two for Joy" | 2003 | — | — | Befriended |
| "Song from Holland" | 2007 | — | — | Non-album singles |
| "Trip" | 2016 | — | — | Non-album singles |
| "The Lakes of Canada 2019" | 2019 | — | — | Non-album singles |
| "Radiant and Holy Night" | 2020 | — | — | Non-album singles |
| "This Thread Is a Green Street" | 2024 | — | — | Midwinter Swimmers |
| "Midwinter Swimmers" | 2024 | — | — | Midwinter Swimmers |
"—" denotes a release that did not chart.

=== Promotional singles ===
List of promotional singles, showing year released and album name
| Title | Year | Album |
|---|---|---|
| "Clear to You" | 1990 | The Innocence Mission |
| "Curious" | 1990 | The Innocence Mission |
| "And Hiding Away" | 1991 | Umbrella |
| "Keeping Awake" | 1995 | Glow |
| "Everything's Different Now" | 1995 | Glow |
| "Today" | 2001 | Small Planes |
| "The Happy Mondays" | 2010 | My Room in the Trees |
| "Green Bus" | 2018 | Sun on the Square |
| "Look Out from Your Window" | 2018 | Sun on the Square |
| "On Your Side" | 2019 | See You Tomorrow |
| "This Boat" | 2019 | See You Tomorrow |

=== B-sides ===
List of B-sides, showing year released and A-side name
| Title | Year | Single |
|---|---|---|
| "Broken Circle" (Acoustic) | 1989 | "Black Sheep Wall" |
| "Notebook" (Acoustic) | 1989 | "Black Sheep Wall" |
| "Your Advice" | 1989 | "Wonder of Birds" |
| "Curious" (Live) | 1989 | "Wonder of Birds" |
| "You Chase the Light" (Acoustic) | 1990 | "I Remember Me" |
| "Wonder of Birds" (Live) | 1990 | "Clear to You" |
| "An Old Sunday" | 1991 | "Sorry and Glad Together" |
| "Let's Talk About Something Else" | 1995 | "Bright as Yellow" |
| "Geranium Lake" | 1995 | "Bright as Yellow" |
| "Bright as Yellow" (Live) | 1995 | "Keeping Awake" |
| "Prayer of Saint Francis" | 1999 | "The Lakes of Canada" |
| "Snow" (GusGus Remix) | 1999 | "The Lakes of Canada" |
| "Peace Be with You" | 2003 | "One for Sorrow, Two for Joy" |

== Internet-only releases ==
List of albums which have been released exclusively for free download on the internet, and additional information
| Title | Details | Further information |
|---|---|---|
| Track of the Month | A series of individual songs, released one-at-a-time each month for free download through the band's official website. | Track listing (showing month released): 1. "No Storms Come" (Aug 2002); 2. "Moon River" (Sep 2002); 3. "A Thousand Miles" (Oct 2002); 4. "East Virginia"^{[c]} (Nov 2002); 5. "A Hymn for Christmas Day"^{[c]} (Dec 2002); 6. "The Way You Know" (Jan 2003); 7. "Rhode Island"^{[d]} (1996 Version) (Feb 2003); 8. "Happy, the End"^{[e]} (Live from the Troubadour on February 2, 1996) (Mar 2003); 9. "Only a Shadow"^{[c]} (Apr 2003); 10. "A Little Rain"^{[f]} (Live from the Troubadour on Feb 2, 1996) (May 2003); 11. "Do You See My Brothers Coming?"^{[g]} (Jun 2003) |
| Seven Christmas Songs | Released: December 14, 2011; Offered for free download through the band's official SoundCloud channel. | Track listing: 1. "See, amid the Winter's Snow"; 2. "O Come, O Come, Emmanuel"; 3. "O Little Town of Bethlehem"^{[h]}; 4. "In the Bleak Midwinter"; 5. "Away in a Manger"^{[h]}; 6. "O Lord of Light"^{[i]}; 7. "Joy to the World"^{[h]} |

== Soundtracks and miscellaneous ==
List of soundtrack and compilation albums which contain rare and/or exclusive material
| Title | Details | Song(s) featured |
|---|---|---|
| Preliminary Hearing | Released: 1986; Label: Creation Records; Type: Sampler album | 1. "Black Wall Sheep" – 4:55; 2. "Tiny Picture" – 4:19 |
| If We Give You This CD, Will You Be Our Best Friend? | Released: 1991; Label: A&M Records; Type: Sampler album | 1. "And Hiding Away" – 3:33; 2. "Now in This Hush" (Acoustic Version) – 3:38 |
| Empire Records OST | Released: August 22, 1995; Label: A&M Records; Type: Soundtrack album | 1. "Bright as Yellow" – 3:33 |
| Live from the Music Hall Vol.1 | Released: 1995; Label: KSCA FM; Type: Live compilation | 1. "Bright as Yellow" (Live) – 3:46 |
| Take Me Home: A Tribute to John Denver | Released: April 18, 2000; Label: Badman Recording Co.; Type: Tribute album | 1. "Follow Me" – 3:17 |
| Evensong | Released: 2000; Label: Evensong Recordings Ltd.; Type: Compilation | 1. "A Thousand Miles" – 3:51 |
| The Pet Series, Vol. 2 | Released: 2003; Label: Sally Forth Records; Type: Compilation | 1. "The Way You Know" – 3:53 |
| Hope Isn't a Word – Comes with a Smile, Vol.11 | Released: 2004; Label: Comes with a Smile; Type: Compilation | 1. "I Haven't Seen This Day Before" (Live) – 3:05 |
| Awake, My Soul / Help Me to Sing: Songs of the Sacred Harp | Released: October 14, 2008; Label: Awake Productions; Type: Compilation | 1. "Africa, 178" – 2:36 |
| The Perks of Being a Wallflower OST | Released: August 1, 2012; Label: Atlantic Records; Type: Soundtrack album | 1. "Evensong" – 3:40 |
| Korda 3 Komp | Released: March 18, 2016; Label: Korda Records; Type: Sampler album | 1. "At Sea" – 3:10 |

== Collaborations and guest appearances ==
The band have collaborated on numerous songs recorded by other artists throughout their career, including:

- "I Belong" on Crack the Sky (1987) by Mylon LeFevre & Broken Heart (song written by Karen and Don)
- "Shadows" on Lead Me On (1988) by Amy Grant (written by Karen and Don)
- "Hard Sun" on Big Harvest (1989) by Indio (background vocals from Karen)
- "Through Your Hands" on Stolen Moments (1990) by John Hiatt (duet with Karen)
- "Don't Face the World Alone" on Brave Heart (1991) by Kim Hill (written by Karen)
- "Cherokee Louise" on Night Ride Home (1991) by Joni Mitchell (background vocals from Karen)
- "Running Away" on From Strength to Strength (1991) by Peter Himmelman (duet with Karen; Don also performs guitar)
- "By Way of Sorrow" on Blue Pony (1997) by Julie Miller (duet with Karen)
- "Constance" and "Motorboat" on Illinois (1997) by Mila Drumke (guitar work by Don on both songs, and backgrounds vocals by Karen on "Motorboat")
- "Frozen Charlotte" and "When They Ring the Golden Bells" on Ophelia (1998) by Natalie Merchant (vocals by Karen and guitar by Don on both tracks)
- "Do You Still Remember" on Davy Jones' Locker (1999) by The Ocean Blue (song recorded by Don; entire album mastered by Don)
- "The Places We've Been" on Ojalá (2017) by Lost Horizons (lead vocals by Karen)
- "This Is the Weather" on In Quiet Moments (2020) by Lost Horizons (lead vocals by Karen)

Don has worked extensively with Lancaster-based singer-songwriter Denison Witmer, and was first credited as an engineer on his debut release, 1995's My Luck, My Love. He has gone on to produce several of Witmer's albums, including Safe Away (1998) and Are You a Dreamer? (2005), as well as the 1999 EP River Bends. He also engineered the LPs Of Sorrow and Joy (2001) and Recovered (2003), and mixed The '80s EP (2000) and Philadelphia Songs (2004). The latter album additionally features background vocals from Karen, on the song "Rock Run". Don also produced the 2003 charity album Poverty, Chastity, Obedience: Remembering Father Mychal F. Judge, O.F.M., and was credited as the mastering engineer for two EPs released by The Ocean Blue: Denmark (2000) and Ayn (2001). Mike Bitts and Steve Brown were both credited with performing bass guitar and drums, respectively, on several songs from Better Living Through Compression, a 2004 album by The Innocence Mission's former guitar technician Cliff Hillis.

== Music videos ==
List of music videos, showing year released and directors
| Title | Year | Director(s) |
|---|---|---|
| "Wonder of Birds" | 1989 | Erick Ifergan |
| "I Remember Me" | 1990 | —N/a |
| "And Hiding Away" | 1991 | —N/a |
| "Bright as Yellow" | 1995 | Dan Winters |
| "My Sisters Return from Ireland" | 2008 | The Innocence Mission |
| "North American Field Song" | 2011 | The Innocence Mission |
| "Hello I Feel the Same" | 2015 | The Innocence Mission |
| "Washington Field Trip" | 2015 | The Innocence Mission |
| "Green Bus" | 2018 | Karen Peris |
| "Look Out from Your Window" | 2018 | Karen Peris |
| "On Your Side" | 2019 | Karen Peris |
| "This Thread Is a Green Street" | 2024 | Karen Peris |
| "Midwinter Swimmers" | 2024 | Karen Peris |

== Notes ==
- ^{^[a]} signifies a track from a Don Peris solo album.
- ^{^[b]} signifies a track from a Karen Peris solo album.
- ^{^[c]} signifies a track that remains officially unreleased.
- ^{^[d]} "Rhode Island" was later re-recorded for My Room in the Trees, although the original 1996 recording remains unreleased.
- ^{^[e]} "Happy, the End" was originally released on Glow.
- ^{^[f]} "A Little Rain" is a Tom Waits cover; this is the only known performance of this song.
- ^{^[g]} "Do You See My Brothers Coming?" was later released as a bonus track on French editions of We Walked in Song.
- ^{^[h]} differs from the version which appeared on Brighter Visions Beam Afar.
- ^{^[i]} is identical to the version which previously appeared on Christ Is My Hope.
