= Small Planes =

Studio album by the Innocence Mission
- Released: September 25, 2001
- Recorded: 1996–2001
- Genre: Alternative pop
- Length: 34:29
- Label: What Are Records?
- Producer: The Innocence Mission

The Innocence Mission chronology
Christ Is My Hope (2000)	Small Planes (2001)	Befriended (2003)

Small Planes, subtitled Lost and Found Songs: 1996–2001, is the fifth studio album by American alternative rock band the Innocence Mission, released on September 25, 2001 by What Are Records?. It consists of new and previously unreleased songs recorded by the band following the release of their 1995 album Glow. The album was released to positive reviews, with several publications describing it as an "outtake" album that contains better material than the primary work of most other bands. Small Planes was issued on vinyl for the first time on November 3, 2021. The vinyl featured an alternate track listing and the song "A Thousand Miles", which had been excluded from the original release.

== Background and recording ==
The band signed to A&M Records in the late 1980s, releasing three studio albums with the label: The Innocence Mission in 1989, Umbrella in 1991, and Glow in 1995. In the late 1990s, A&M merged with other labels to form Interscope Geffen A&M Records. The band's lead guitarist Don Peris said they had mutually parted ways with A&M a few months prior to the merger, but said they had recorded a fourth studio album for the label which was ready to be released in 1996. Don elaborated: "We just weren't happy with the suggestions that A&M was making and by the time things spun out [with the label], we had moved on to newer songs and those songs felt old, or they just didn't feel representative of where we were as a band anymore." They retained the master tapes for the unreleased studio album, and Don noted their intention to release some of those songs at a later date.

== Release and promotion ==
Small Planes is an album of new recordings and other songs recorded by the band following the release of their 1995 album Glow. The record was released solely on CD on September 25, 2001 by What Are Records?, with the rear cover of the CD containing the subtitle Lost and Found Songs: 1996–2001. The album was issued on vinyl for the first time on November 3, 2021. This version features alternate mixes of several songs, and restores "A Thousand Miles" to the track listing; the band called Small Planes the song's "original home". The track had previously been released on the 2000 charitable compilation Evensong, as well as the band's 2008 EP Street Map.

== Critical reception ==
Professional ratings
Review scores
Source	Rating
AllMusic	3/5 stars
Audiogalaxy	4/5 stars

AllMusic said that although Small Planes consisted of outtakes, the album was "as good as many bands' major works", and that it was a "unique and special, gentle, pure, and precious" record. Similarly, a writer for Audiogalaxy said that even if the album was "cobbled together out of tracks left behind between sessions for 1995's Glow and the present, Small Planes largely displays the consistent wholeness of a new studio release." They went on to describe it as one of the most beautiful albums released in 2001, and that it was "an essential purchase for even casual fans of the Innocence Mission, it's the rare odds-and-ends disc that works as a perfect point of introduction to this ethereally beautiful band." This sentiment was echoed by Tangzine, who also praised the collaboration between Karen and Don Peris, saying they were "a match made in heaven". They elaborated that Karen had "the ability to take you to another place and make you – in the course of a three minute song at least – forget the things that drag you down and prevent you from experiencing happiness and joy", and praised Don's "signature guitar tones and occasional backing vocals", which they said helped "create near perfect melodies and songs that rival anything [the band] have done in the past." Their writer also alluded to the then-recent September 11 attacks, and said the album would leave "a listener of any faith with a message of peace and hope that speaks volumes, especially in light of everything happening in our world today."

In his review of the album, Jeffrey Overstreet described Small Planes as the "Pick of the Month" and said The Innocence Mission have "better 'leftover' songs than most bands' best work. Not only is this archival collection beautiful, but it's cohesive and thematic as well." He praised the inclusion of Mike Bitts and Steve Brown, band members who were largely absent from the 1999 album Birds of My Neighborhood, saying they bring "an energy and a vitality that varies the pace of [Small Planes] nicely." He summarized by rating the album four out of five, calling it "impressive". Jim Farber of the New York Daily News said that although Small Planes was not as strong as their "finest" record, Birds of My Neighborhood, the album "has its charms. As always, Peris' elliptical lyrics find great feeling in the ordinary scenes and tasks of the day. And her ascetic, acoustic-based tunes shine. You won't find a group with a wiser sense of wonder." In their review of the album, Paste said: "It takes a special band to evoke poetry out of a reviewer, but that's just what The Innocence Mission has done to our own Jason Killingsworth. His words convey the emotion that [the album] stirs in us better than any prose could". The remainder of the review consisted of a poem written by Killingsworth inspired by the album's content.

== Track listing ==
All tracks are written by Karen Peris, except where noted.

No.	Title	Writer(s)	Length
1.	"Rooftop"	Karen Peris; Don Peris	1:57
2.	"Too Early to Say"		3:20
3.	"Migration"		4:14
4.	"Today"		3:40
5.	"The Girl on My Left"		2:21
6.	"Song About Traveling"		3:44
7.	"Oh Do Not Fly Away"		2:48
8.	"I Left the Grounds"		1:15
9.	"Some Clear Joy Is Coming"	Karen Peris; Don Peris	3:31
10.	"Small Planes"		4:31
11.	"I Have Loved You"	Michael Joncas	3:09
Total length:			34:29

Small Planes – 2021 vinyl version
No.	Title	Writer(s)	Length
1.	"Oh Do Not Fly Away"		2:51
2.	"Today"		3:39
3.	"The Girl on My Left"		2:20
4.	"Song About Traveling"		3:43
5.	"Some Clear Joy Is Coming"	Karen Peris; Don Peris	3:30
6.	"Rooftop" (Alternate Mix)	Karen Peris; Don Peris	2:04
7.	"A Thousand Miles" (Alternate Mix)	Karen Peris; Don Peris	3:40
8.	"Too Early to Say"		3:19
9.	"Migration"		4:13
10.	"I Left the Grounds" (Alternate Mix)		1:16
11.	"Small Planes"		4:30
12.	"I Have Loved You" (Alternate Mix/Edit)	Joncas	2:19
Total length:			37:24

== Personnel ==
Credits adapted from the liner notes of the original CD.

- Karen Peris – vocals, guitar, piano, bass and organ
- Don Peris – backing vocals, guitars, organ and additional drums
- Mike Bitts – backing vocals and bass guitar
- Steve Brown – drums
