= Midwinter Swimmers =

2024 album by The Innocence Mission

Studio album by The Innocence Mission
- Released: November 29, 2024
- Genre: Dream pop; folk
- Length: 39:41
- Label: Bella Union; P-Vine Records; Thérèse Records
- Producer: The Innocence Mission

The Innocence Mission chronology
See You Tomorrow (2020)	Midwinter Swimmers (2024)

Singles from Midwinter Swimmers
- 1. "This Thread Is a Green Street" Released: September 3, 2024; 2. "Midwinter Swimmers" Released: October 16, 2024

Midwinter Swimmers is the thirteenth studio album by American band The Innocence Mission, released on November 25, 2024, by Bella Union in Europe, P-Vine Records in Japan, and Thérèse Records internationally. Lead vocalist Karen Peris composed every song on the album, with the exception of lead single "This Thread Is a Green Street", which was composed alongside her husband Don. The two produced the record and performed all of its instrumentation, alongside the band's bassist Mike Bitts.

A dream pop and folk album containing influences from bossa nova music, the record was described by music publications as a return to the sound of the band's 1990s and early 2000s material, specifically their albums Glow and Small Planes. The record foregoes much of the orchestration found on their later work to reintroduce a more rock-based, lo-fi sound. Lyrics on the album deal with themes of love, loss, and separation, with Karen's Catholic background noted as an influence on album's lyrical content.

"This Thread Is a Green Street" and the title track preceded the album's release as singles, with Karen Peris creating animated music videos for both songs. She also created a music video for the song "Your Saturday Picture". The album received positive reviews from music critics upon release, with numerous reviews praising the composition, vocals, instrumentation, and production. The record also appeared in several publication's year-end lists.

== Composition and style ==
Every song on the album was composed by Karen Peris, except "This Thread Is a Green Street", which was written by Karen alongside her husband Don. They began composing material during the early period of the COVID-19 pandemic, when their children were home from college. Karen wrote the album's songs in her bedroom, attic, and garage, so as to not interfere with their online classes. She said this reminded her of her experience writing songs when she was a teenager. Karen and Don performed all instrumentation on the record, with the exception of upright bass on "This Thread Is a Green Street" and "A Hundred Flowers" and electric bass guitar on "Cloud to Cloud" and "A Different Day", which were performed by the band's longtime bassist Mike Bitts.

Midwinter Swimmers is a dream pop and folk album, which also contains influences from bossa nova music. The Line of Best Fit called it a "spectacularly beautiful" record. Their writer said in contrast to their recent orchestral-based work, Midwinter Swimmers saw the band returning to the sound of previous records Glow and Small Planes, but with a "greater insight and deepened affection." It is a predominantly acoustic record, with a Mellotron used to create the strings. Silent Radio noted the intricate level of detail found within the album's production, which they said "mingles lo-fi charm with subtle shifts to create a cinematic palette."

Lyrically, the record deals with themes of love, loss, and separation. Pitchfork noted the impact Karen's Catholic upbringing has had on her lyricism throughout her career, describing how on Midwinter Swimmers, she uses that belief as a means to "better understand the world" and her "place within it." They clarified the influence of Christianity is subtle, describing Karen as "no preacher or proselytizer. She's instead like a solicitous follower who does her part by keeping the sacristy tidy or straightening bibles in hymnal racks: creating a welcoming space for those seeking comfort."

=== Songs ===
Karen said the lyric of "This Thread Is a Green Street" is inspired by the "transportive quality" of objects. She said the song was composed when her children were away at college, and was inspired by her memories of walking around her neighborhood with her children when they were young. She explained that, now her children have grown, her neighborhood can feel like a landscape "full of doorways to those memories, and like doorways to possibility and just the joy of being alive." She said the track is about "how love can transcend distance". She explained that when recording the song, the band were seeking to "find the half-remembered beauty of sing-alongs of our 1970s childhoods." The backing vocals were recorded using GarageBand. Backing vocals are an unusual trait in the band's discography, but Karen said they "gave the song an atmosphere that seemed to fit what we'd been thinking of". Numerous reviews compared it to the work of The Mamas & the Papas.

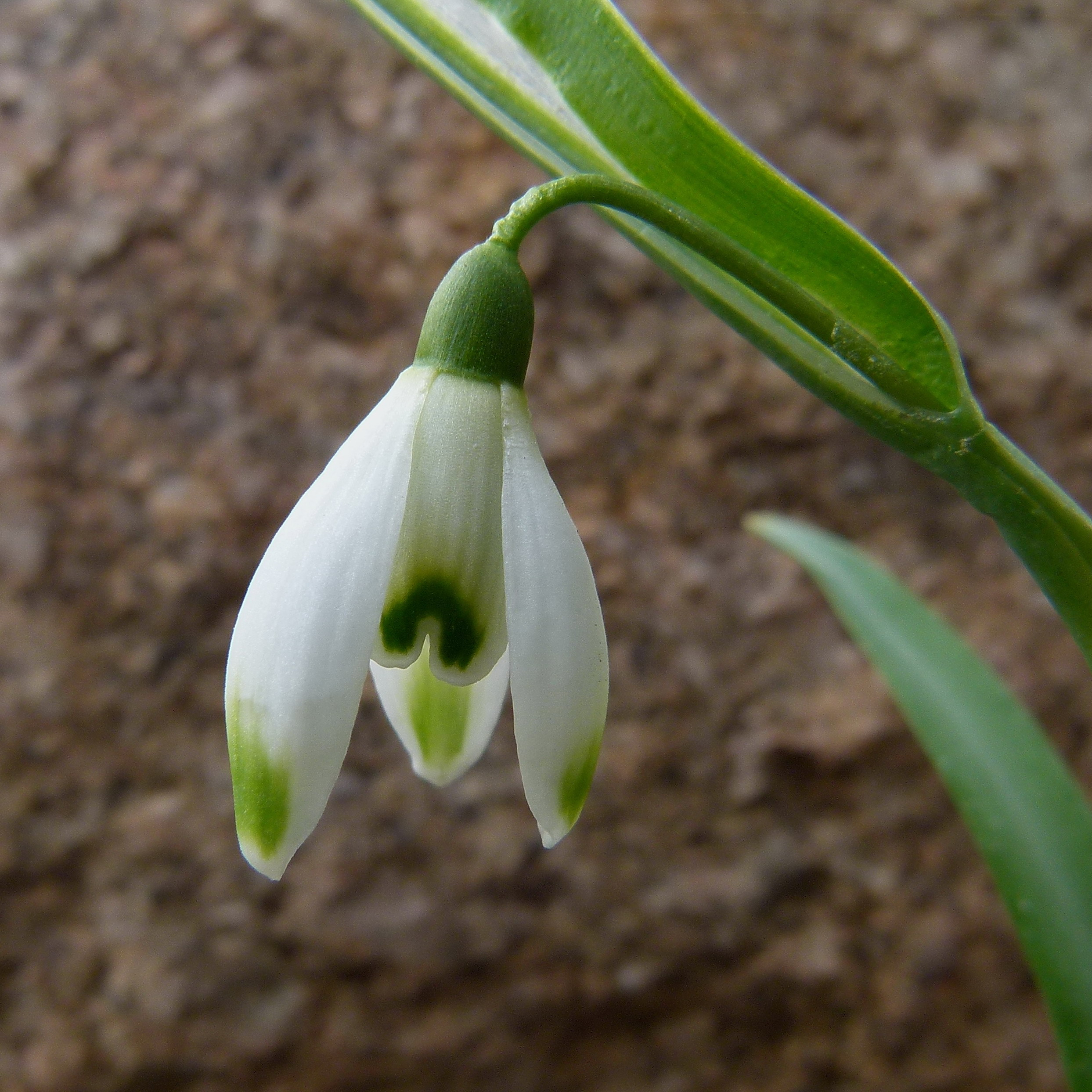
Snowdrop flowers inspired the creation of the song "Midwinter Swimmers".

According to Karen, the title track is about anticipating the arrival of a loved one. She said the contrast between the two words in the title reminded her of how "fragile-looking, small and pale winter flowers like snowdrops are actually so hardy and enduring that they can bloom in the snow. And this seemed to connect also with the bravery of the person who has been away." Uncut described it as an album highlight, comparing it to the work of Arthur Lee and Yo La Tengo. Silent Radio praised the song's "heartbreaking" lyricism, and commended the musical "shifts, pauses and changes". KLOF Magazine elaborated that "Occasionally, the music drops out entirely, and we are left with Karen's voice: at these points, the song crystallizes around a point of sadness or yearning or loss".

The lyric of "The Camera Divides the Coast of Maine" is inspired by the work of poet Ivan V. Lalić, specifically his poem "Places We Love" and its line "What is beneath the window: a street or years?" The lyric of the song references the existential link between memory, place and time, and its music features expansive instrumentation. Pitchfork said the song "cultivates a grand vision of romance", saying the song describes an "alternate dream life on the coast of Maine, living alongside sunlit moss and a picturesque striped lighthouse."

The title of "John Williams" is not a reference to the composer of the same name. Karen had used both names in previous songs titles, including "The Brothers Williams Said" and "John as Well" on the band's 2021 album See You Tomorrow. She said the use of those names was a stylistic choice, explaining she thought they sounded good when accompanied by melody. It is a rock-influenced song, featuring a percussive foundation. The Pinnacle Gazette described it as an album highlight, saying the band stepped outside of their comfort zone by creating a rock song, albeit one that still adheres to their folk influences. KLOF Magazine compared it to the work of Sibylle Baier, explaining that it "does an awful lot with the most minimal of ingredients".

"We Would Meet in Center City" is a piano-based ballad, and features Karen utilizing the highest vocal register of any song in the band's discography. No More Workhorse said it contains one of Karen's best vocal performances, describing her voice as "angelic" and "both strong and delicate". The Pinnacle Gazette said her voice provides "emotional weight and grace" to the track. Pitchfork said the song contains an "emotionally walloping chorus", and praised how the questions posed in the chorus are responded to "with a wordless, goosebump-inducing vocal refrain that, appropriately, feels like being brushed by a ghost." KLOF Magazine praised its composition, describing the lyric as both "meditative and hopeful", noting it juxtaposes influences from eastern philosophy and western songwriting. They compared it musically to the work of Yann Tiersen, saying the song "uses graceful piano and a flourish of vocal harmony to capture a fleeting, nostalgic feeling."

"Your Saturday Picture" contains influences from bossa nova music. KLOF Magazine also noted the influence of 1960s psychedelic folk on the song. "Cloud to Cloud" features a more expansive arrangement compared to the rest of the album. The song is a direct sequel to the lyric of "Your Saturday Picture", describing how the lovers reunited. The song opens with acoustic guitar, and gradually expands to a more orchestral arrangement. "A Hundred Flowers" is one of the more downbeat tracks on the album. Silent Radio said Karen's vocals and the melody of the song are "especially gorgeous", and described the lyric as a reflection on the unpredictability of life. The track contains upright bass performed by Mike Bitts. "Sisters and Brothers" also contains influences from bossa nova music. KLOF Magazine said it contains a "zen-like stillness ... with its gentle repetitions and message of gratitude." Silent Radio praised the descriptive lyric, saying it was "an example of how a song does not require volume to be vivid and alive."

"Orange of the Westering Sun" is inspired by Karen's memories of recording the band's first two albums at Joni Mitchell's home studio in Los Angeles, albums which were produced by Mitchell's then-husband Larry Klein. Karen recalled how their home "always smelled like lilies, so it became Easter-like, which may have been one of the reasons that there was the feeling of being at the start of something." Numerous reviews praised the lyricism of the track, with Silent Radio saying the lyric equally conveys both fear and gratitude. Pitchfork said the lyric of the song evokes Christian imagery, in its theme of hope overcoming sadness. The album closer, "A Different Day", is a subdued song. For Folk's Sake said it is "richly melodic" musically, and said its lyric equally depicts "yearning, optimism and goodness". KLOF Magazine said the track is about the "impossibility of experiencing time as it actually happens, and the paradoxical need to live in the moment."

== Release and promotion ==
"This Thread Is a Green Street" was released as a one-track digital download and streaming single on September 3, 2024. Karen directed a music video for the song, which was released the same day. The title track was issued as the album's second single on October 16. Karen also created a music video for that song. Midwinter Swimmers was released on November 29, 2024, by Bella Union in Europe, Thérèse Records in the United States and Canada, and P-Vine Records in Japan. The Japanese edition contains an exclusive bonus track titled "Moving Around". An animated music video for "Your Saturday Picture" was released on November 29.

An alternate version of "A Different Day" was released as a single on February 5, 2025. The band was inducted in the Central Pennsylvania Music Hall of Fame the following month, where two of the original band members – Mike Bitts and Steve Brown – performed alongside several local musicians. All four members of the band performed at the Ardmore Music Hall in Pennsylvania in May. An EP titled The Raindrop Cars was released on July 9. The EP contains five outtakes from Midwinter Swimmers, as well as three alternate versions of songs from the album.

== Critical reception ==
Professional ratings
Review scores
Source	Rating
The Arts Desk	4/5 stars
The Guardian	4/5 stars
KLOF Magazine	Positive
Mojo	4/5 stars
Pitchfork	8.0/10
Radio France	Positive

The album was released to positive reviews from music critics. BrooklynVegan dubbed it the album of the week, calling it an "achingly beautiful" record. Pitchfork listed it as one of the best albums released in November 2024. The following month, it appeared on NPR's list of featured albums. Silent Radio included it at number 36 on their list of the best albums of 2024. The album also appeared at number ten on BrooklynVegan's list of the best albums of 2024.

The Arts Desk commended Karen's lyricism, comparing Midwinter Swimmers to Claude Monet's Nymphéas paintings, saying both contain subtle imagery that can be overlooked at first before gradually being revealed on repeated observations. They said the record differs from the band's previous work in the "more assured rapport" between the style of composition and the "delicacy" of the production, saying: "So remarkable a balance is rarely struck." The Guardian called the album "exquisite", praising Karen's lyricism and the instrumentation, specifically Don's guitar and Mike Bitt's bass work, which they said gave the album "an affectingly ethereal, distant quality". Mojo also praised the songwriting, saying the album contained "songs of experience, beautifully realized." Pitchfork said the record was reminiscent of a 1960s or 1970s folk album, saying it contained "all the hope, promise, and desire records of that era tend to hold." Their writer likened Midwinter Swimmers to an imagined collaboration between Vashti Bunyan and Paul Simon.

The Pinnacle Gazette praised the album for balancing "rich emotional depth with subtle instrumentation", saying it expands upon their established sound without detracting from the aesthetic of their previous work. Silent Radio commended Karen's vocals and the "immaculate" instrumentation, calling the album "an intimate gem." Similarly, No More Workhorse said the record "aches with melancholy and quiet beauty", and said it "feels more expansive and richer than their previous work without forsaking their core sound." Their writer summarized by saying that although the album "might initially feel like comforting background music" to those unfamiliar with the band's work, it was a "rich, subtly textured record, created with exceptional finesse".

KLOF Magazine said the quality of the band's songwriting has "remained unfalteringly high throughout [their career], which is something that can't be said for many bands with upwards of a dozen albums". They praised them for constantly introducing new elements to their music, and said the album was ideal for first-time listeners of the band, but noted such listeners would "have a huge journey of discovery ahead [of them]". For Folk's Sake praised the album's lyricism, saying the lyrics create a world equally defined by both sadness and joy. Americana UK praised both the album's production and Karen's vocals, calling Midwinter Swimmers "fragile, tender and beautiful".

While noting the global political climate of 2024, German publication Platten Tests described the album as an "effective antidote to hatred, agitation and discord", saying the record is instead imbued with a sense of hope, contrary to the prevailing social sentiment of "everyone against everyone". They praised the album's composition, saying the songs "don't just flow quietly, there are always short pauses, spherical-elegiac instrumental bridges—which then lead into radiant choruses." They said the songs on Midwinter Swimmers are stronger overall than on previous albums Sun on the Square and See You Tomorrow. Their writer summarized by saying, through the album, the listener feels the "healing power of music, which truly and outstandingly confronts all the tumult and roar out there."

== Track listing ==
All tracks are written by Karen Peris except track 1, written by Karen and Don Peris.

Midwinter Swimmers track listing
No.	Title	Length
1.	"This Thread Is a Green Street"	3:46
2.	"Midwinter Swimmers"	2:56
3.	"The Camera Divides the Coast of Maine"	3:43
4.	"John Williams"	3:41
5.	"We Would Meet in Center City"	3:42
6.	"Your Saturday Picture"	2:58
7.	"Cloud to Cloud"	4:40
8.	"A Hundred Flowers"	3:04
9.	"Sisters and Brothers"	3:08
10.	"Orange of the Westering Sun"	4:24
11.	"A Different Day"	3:34
Total length:		39:41

Midwinter Swimmers – Japanese bonus track
No.	Title	Length
12.	"Moving Around"	3:46
Total length:		43:27

== Credits and personnel ==
Credits adapted from the liner notes of the vinyl edition of the album.

- Karen Peris – vocals, production, nylon-string guitar, baritone guitar, piano, pump organ, melodica, mirage and mellotron; electric bass guitar (tracks 2, 3, 4, 6 and 9); electric rhythm guitar (track 4); illustration and design
- Don Peris – harmony vocals, production, acoustic and electric guitars, drums
- Mike Bitts – upright bass (tracks 1 and 8), electric bass guitar (tracks 7 and 11)

== Charts ==
Chart (2024)	Peak position
UK Independent Albums Breakers (OCC)	20
