= One for Sorrow (nursery rhyme) =

Traditional English divination nursery rhyme about magpies

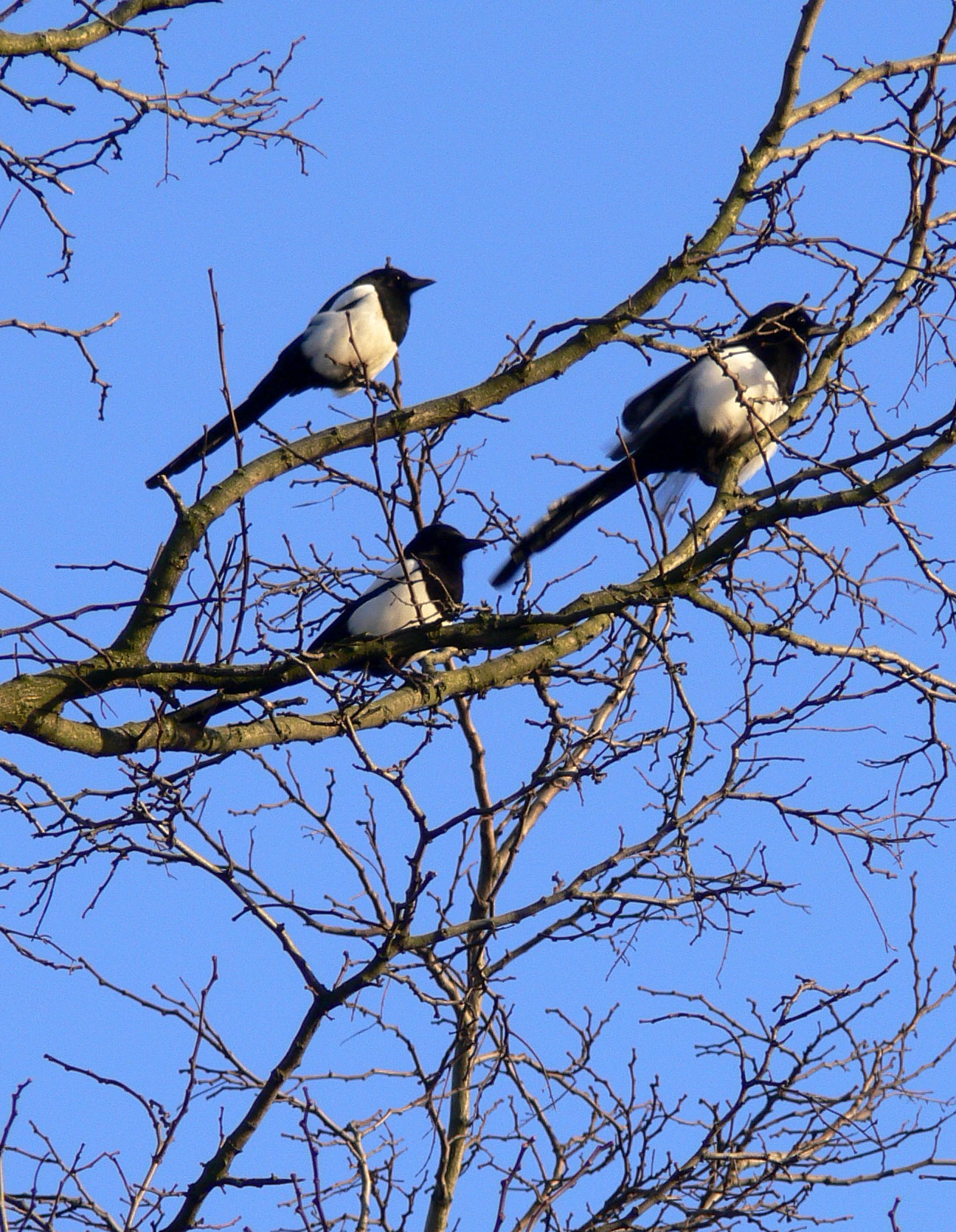
- Three magpies in a tree

Nursery rhyme
- Published: c. 1780

"One for Sorrow" is a traditional children's nursery rhyme about magpies. According to an old superstition, the number of magpies seen tells if one will have bad or good luck.

== Lyrics ==
There is considerable variation in the lyrics used. A common modern version is:

One for sorrow,
Two for joy,
Three for a girl,
Four for a boy,
Five for silver,
Six for gold,
Seven for a secret never to be told.

A longer version of the rhyme recorded in Lancashire continues:

Eight for a wish,
Nine for a kiss,
Ten a surprise you should be careful not to miss,
Eleven for health,
Twelve for wealth,
Thirteen beware it's the devil himself.

== Origins ==
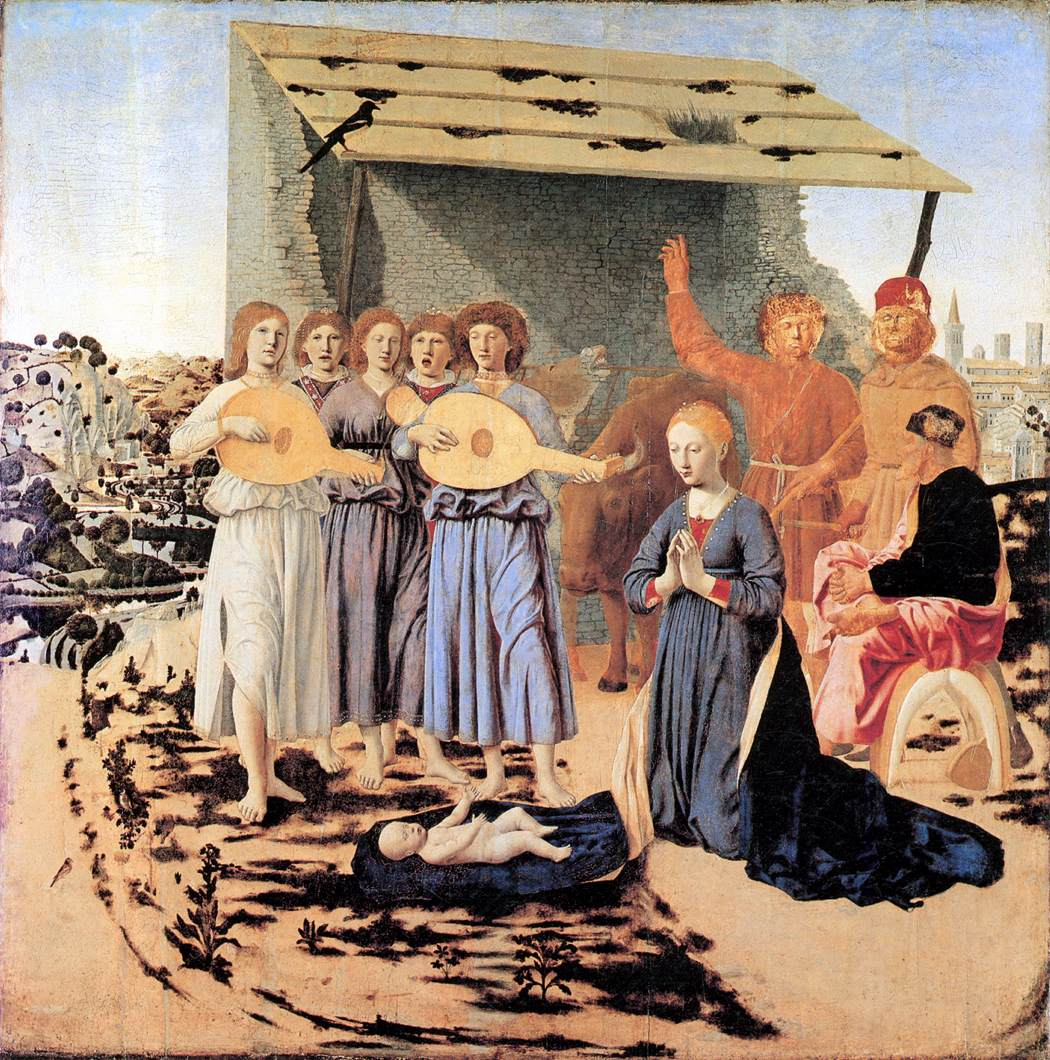
One magpie at the birth of Jesus, perhaps presaging sorrow for Mary: Piero della Francesca's The Nativity

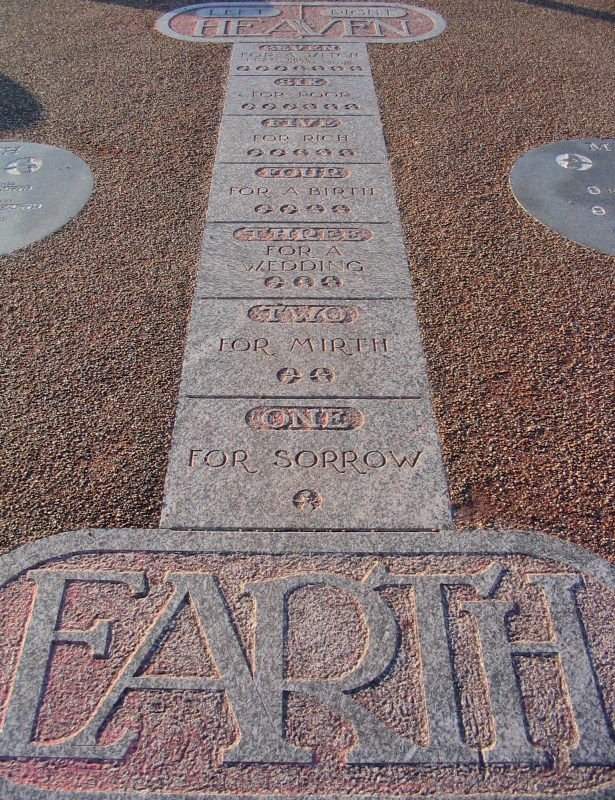
Children's game hopscotch played in Lancashire, England with lyric close to the 1846 version of the rhyme

The rhyme has its origins in ornithomancy superstitions connected with magpies, considered a bird of ill omen in some cultures, and in Britain, at least as far back as the early sixteenth century. The rhyme was first recorded in Samuel Johnson and George Steevens's 1780 supplement to their 1778 edition of The Plays of William Shakespeare with the lyric:

One for sorrow,
Two for mirth,
Three for a wedding,
Four for death.

One of the earliest versions to extend this was published, with variations, in Michael Aislabie Denham's Proverbs and Popular Sayings (London, 1846). The printed version censors the words "hell" and "devil" in the final lines:

One for sorrow,
Two for luck (varia. mirth);
Three for a wedding,
Four for death (varia. birth);
Five for silver,
Six for gold;
Seven for a secret never to be told,
Eight for heaven,
Nine for ––––,
And ten for the d–––l's own sell!

In the 19th century book, A Guide to the Scientific Knowledge of Things Familiar, a proverb concerning magpies is recited: "A single magpie in spring, foul weather will bring". The book further explains that this superstition arises from the habits of pairs of magpies to forage together only when the weather is fine.

An English tradition holds that a single magpie be greeted with a salutation in order to ward off the bad luck it may bring. A greeting might be something like "Good morning, Mr Magpie, how are Mrs Magpie and all the other little magpies?", and a 19th century version recorded in Shropshire is to say "Devil, Devil, I defy thee! Magpie, magpie, I go by thee!" and to spit on the ground three times.

On occasion, jackdaws, crows and other Corvidae are associated with the rhyme, particularly in America where magpies are less common. In eastern India, the erstwhile British colonial bastion, the common myna is the bird of association.

A version of the rhyme became familiar to many UK children when it became the theme tune of the children's TV show Magpie, which ran from 1968 to 1980. The popularity of this version, performed by The Spencer Davis Group, is thought to have displaced the many regional versions that had previously existed.

== Popular culture ==
The rhyme was used in the theme tune of the ITV children’s TV show Magpie (1968-80).

The name of the rock band Counting Crows derives from the rhyme, which is featured in the song "A Murder of One" on the band's debut album, August and Everything After.

The first track on Seanan McGuire's album Wicked Girls, also titled "Counting Crows", features a modified version of the rhyme.

The artist S. J. Tucker's song, "Ravens in the Library," from her album Mischief, utilises the modern version of the rhyme as a chorus, and the rest of the verses relate to the rhyme in various ways.

The English band The Unthanks recorded a version of this song on their 2015 album Mount the Air, and the song appeared in the BBC series Detectorists, in the 4th season of the HBO series True Detective, and in the 14th season of Vera. The American alternative rock band The Innocence Mission featured a song called "One for Sorrow, Two for Joy" on their 2003 album Befriended. "One For Sorrow" on Megan Washington's album There There also features the rhyme.

Anthony Horowitz used the rhyme as the organising scheme for the story-within-a-story in his 2016 novel Magpie Murders and in the subsequent television adaptation of the same name.

The nursery rhyme's name was used for a book written by Mary Downing Hahn, One for Sorrow: A Ghost Story. The book additionally contains references to the nursery rhyme.

Sir Humphry Davy attributed the connection to joy and sorrow in his Salmonia: or Days of Fly Fishing (1828), in which he wrote that 'For anglers in spring it has always been regarded as unlucky to see single magpies, but two may be always regarded as a favourable omen; [...] in cold and stormy weather one magpie alone leaves the nest in search of food; the other remaining sitting on the eggs [...] when two go out [...] the weather is warm [...] favourable for fishing'.

Daphne du Maurier's 1936 novel Jamaica Inn references the nursery rhyme in the scene at Launceston between Jem Merlyn and Mary Yellan. ‘He took her face in his hands. ‘“One for sorrow, two for joy”’ he said. “I’ll give you the rest when you’re in a more yielding frame of mind. It wouldn’t do to finish the rhyme tonight.”’

The MMO video game The Secret World released in 2012 (later remade as Secret World Legends) features a puzzle in which seven magpies are seen in a kind of afterlife, each speaking a line of the rhyme.

The finnish Death Metal band Insomnium named their fifth studio album One for Sorrow after this rhyme and going along with it they released clothing with the full poem of 1846 inprinted on the back.
