= My Room in the Trees =

Studio album by The Innocence Mission
- Released: July 13, 2010
- Recorded: 2008–2009
- Genres: Alternative rock, indie pop
- Length: 42:12
- Label: Badman
- Producer: The Innocence Mission

The Innocence Mission chronology
Street Map (2008)	My Room in the Trees (2010)	Hello I Feel the Same (2015)

My Room in the Trees is the ninth studio album by the Innocence Mission, released July 13, 2010 by Badman Recording Company.

The iTunes edition of the album contained an exclusive bonus track, "Greys and Blues". The song was a pre-order bonus track, meaning that it was only available to those who pre-ordered the entire album before July 13.

== Background and production ==
Intended for release in spring 2009, the album was preceded by the EP Street Map in December 2008. The EP – released independently by the Innocence Mission via their own LAMP label – was intended to preview several tracks that would appear on their upcoming studio album. However, an update to their website in September 2009 revealed that after further recording, the next LP had "turned out to be a mostly new group of songs, with maybe one song from Street Map". In March 2010, it was announced that no songs on Street Map would appear on My Room in the Trees.

The song "I'd Follow If I Could" was released as a bonus track under the title "Shooting Star (Sketch)" on international editions of their previous studio album, We Walked in Song. "Rhode Island" is a new version of a song from 1996. The band performed it on their tour for the album Glow tour and on the radio show Acoustic Café in February 1996. A demo of "Rhode Island" from 1997 was offered briefly at the band's web site as a free download in February 2003. The new recording of "Rhode Island" has double-tracked harmonies.

"Rain (Setting Out in the Leaf Boat)" features the return of founding member Steve Brown on drums. Brown left the group in 1997 to pursue a career as a chef. Two tracks ("Mile-Marker" and "The Melendys Go Abroad") are instrumentals, a staple of Don Peris's solo work.

== Track listing ==
All songs written and composed by Karen Peris, except where noted.

No.	Title	Writer(s)	Length
1.	"Rain (Setting Out in the Leaf Boat)"		4:13
2.	"The Happy Mondays"	Karen Peris, Don Peris	4:31
3.	"God Is Love"		3:37
4.	"Gentle the Rain at Home"		3:47
5.	"Spring"		3:57
6.	"All the Weather"	Karen Peris, Don Peris	2:58
7.	"Rhode Island"	Karen Peris, Don Peris	3:24
8.	"North American Field Song"		3:19
9.	"Mile-Marker"	Don Peris	2:02
10.	"The Leaves Lift High"		3:58
11.	"I'd Follow If I Could"		2:00
12.	"The Melendys Go Abroad"		1:31
13.	"Shout for Joy"		2:55
14.	"Greys and Blues" (iTunes Bonus Track)		3:24
Total length:			45:35

== Personnel ==
- Karen Peris: Vocals, Guitars, Piano, Pump Organ, Melodica, Artwork
- Don Peris: Electric and Acoustic Guitars, Drums, Cello, Background Vocals
- Mike Bitts: Upright and Electric Bass
- Steve Brown: Drums on "Rain (Setting Out in the Leaf Boat)"
- Gina Di Carlo: Violin on "Rain (Setting Out in the Leaf Boat)"
- Carl Saff: Mastering

== Charts ==
Chart (2010)	Peak position
U.S. Billboard Top Heatseekers	42
