= Denison Witmer =

American singer-songwriter

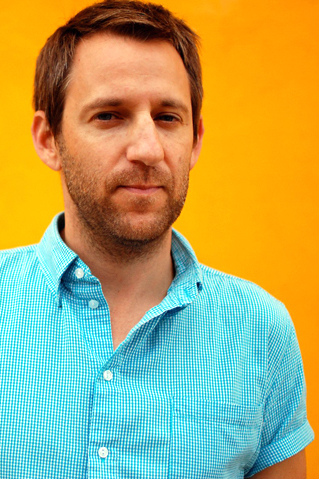
- Denison Witmer

Background information
- Born: Denison Stuart Witmer
- Origin: Lancaster, Pennsylvania, U.S.
- Genres: Acoustic, folk, folk rock, folk pop, alternative, singer–songwriter
- Occupations: Songwriter, musician
- Instrument: Guitar
- Years active: 1995–present
- Labels: The Militia Group; Burnt Toast Vinyl; Velvet Blue Music; Fugitive Recordings; Tooth & Nail Records; Bad Taste Music (Europe); SPUNK! (Australia); Ales Music (Korea); Asthmatic Kitty Records (2012–present)
- Website: Denisonwitmer.com

Denison Witmer is an American singer-songwriter from Lancaster, Pennsylvania, United States. His first release, in 1995, was a cassette titled My Luck, My Love. He has since released six studio LPs; two live albums, a cover album (Recovered); three EPs; and an LP with The River Bends—a side project consisting of members of the Philadelphia-based alt-country band One Star Hotel. Witmer's 2005 album, Are You a Dreamer?, produced by Don Peris of The Innocence Mission and featuring Sufjan Stevens, received acclaim, including positive reviews from Pitchfork Media and Entertainment Weekly. Witmer and Stevens appeared on Rosie Thomas's 2007 album These Friends of Mine, an album which included Rosie Thomas' version of Paper Doll, a track originally written and recorded by Witmer. Witmer toured with Rosie Thomas in support of that album in venues across the US and Europe.

Witmer's style has been described as "neo-folk." He has also been compared to 1970s-era singer-songerwriters, including Cat Stevens and Nick Drake. Witmer's lyrics are poetic and thoughtful; his guitar work, while simple-sounding, relies on complex fingerpicking.

== Early life ==
Denison Witmer was born and raised in Lancaster, Pennsylvania. He was raised Mennonite and attended Lancaster Mennonite School. His guitar teacher was Don Peris.

Before becoming a full-time musician, Witmer worked in the greenhouse which his family owned.

Witmer's and all of his brothers' full names have the initials "DSW."

== Career ==
=== My Luck, My Love ===
Witmer released a cassette tape titled My Luck, My Love in 1995. The album was recorded as a project for an English class during Witmer's senior year of high school. Only 250 copies were made, and the album was given to family and friends. Though My Luck, My Love is Witmer's first release, he does not view it as his true debut but as the extension of a hobby.

=== Safe Away ===
Witmer released his first album Safe Away in 1998. The album, produced by Don Peris, was first self-released by Witmer. He began playing shows in an effort to sell the one thousand copies produced. The album sold out, and indie label Burnt Toast Vinyl approached Witmer, asking to re-release it.

Safe Away received a positive review from Allmusic: "Witmer proceeds through the setlist with the confidence and generosity of a seasoned songwriter, despite the journal-like candor of his lyrics."

=== Of Joy and Sorrow ===
Of Joy & Sorrow was released in 2001. Witmer attempted to make the album more accessible and straightforward than his first: "I feel a little bit more tangible, I feel a little less obscure. It's not another record about breaking up with someone. It's not another record about losing that one particular person." Concerning the album's influences, he noted, "I was listening to a lot of ‘70s singer/songwriter stuff like Jackson Brown and Carol King and Neil Young and Van Morrison and I was going for a little bit of that style."

The title Of Joy & Sorrow comes from The Prophet by Khalil Gibran: "Then a woman said, Speak to us of Joy and Sorrow. And he answered: [...] Some of you say, 'Joy is greater than sorrow,' and others say, 'Nay, sorrow is the greater.' But I say unto you, they are inseparable. Together they come, and when one sits alone with you at your board, remember that the other is asleep upon your bed. Verily you are suspended like scales between your sorrow and your joy." Witmer stated, "I want to experience every emotion as fully as possible. [...] Sorrow has encouraged me to never take my joy for granted."

=== Philadelphia Songs ===
Witmer released his third album, Philadelphia Songs, in 2002. The album was influenced by Witmer's experience moving from a small town to a big city for the first time. Witmer had a difficult time adjusting to having most of his time taken up by an office job and losing inspiration, and the album was about the ups and downs of young adult life and.

Whereas Safe Away was guitar and vocals and Of Joy & Sorrow was more orchestrated, Witmer stated that Philadelphia Songs strikes a balance between his first two albums: “I just feel like I accomplished something that I’ve been trying to accomplish for a while.”

The album was produced by Blake Wescott and features instrumental work by The Six Parts Seven.

=== Recovered ===
Witmer released a covers album titled Recovered in 2003.

=== Are You a Dreamer? ===
Witmer's fifth album, Are You a Dreamer?, was released in 2005. It was produced by Don Peris who, along with Karen Peris, contributed instrumental and vocal work.

Are You a Dreamer? received a B+ review score from Entertainment Weekly: “His brand of happy anachronism is easy enough to fall into — if you can slow down long enough to enjoy it.”

In 2006, The Militia Group label re-issued his first album Safe Away as a special two-disc edition with new artwork and a bonus EP.

On his 30th birthday in November 2006, Witmer began offering 30 of his songs (and 3 "bonus" songs) for free on a website called Happy Birthday Denison. They were new acoustic renditions of previously released songs, covers, and new offerings. Witmer intended to offer a new free song every year on his birthday. However, the website (previously located at happybirthdaydenison.com) is now down. Happy Birthday Denison served as a fundraiser for Partners in Health and Musicians On Call, though no donations were required to download the songs.

=== Carry the Weight ===
Witmer released Carry the Weight in 2008. Produced at London Bridge Studios in Seattle, the album was Witmer's attempt at a "real studio album." Carry the Weight features James McAlister and Rosie Thomas on most songs, and Noah Harris.

=== The Ones Who Wait ===
The Ones Who Wait was first available in 2011 under the Mono Vs Stereo label. It received a wider release in 2012 after Witmer signed with Asthmatic Kitty Records.

In Witmer's own words, the album is about "patience and reverence. Being mindful and open to what you’re experiencing. A desire to take hold of what’s happening in your life, yet trusting the mystery of it enough to let go and participate rather than dictate."

The album grew from an EP to a full-length album, described by Witmer as an "accidental record." It was influenced by landmarks in Witmer's life, including his marriage, his father's death, and his first child's birth.

CJ Camerieri, Devin Greenwood, James McAlister, Charles Staub, and Rosie Thomas contributed to The Ones Who Wait.

== Discography ==
Date of Release	Title	Label
1998	Safe Away	Burnt Toast Vinyl, The Militia Group (2006 re-release)
1999	River Bends EP	Velvet Blue Music
2001	The '80s EP	Burnt Toast Vinyl
2001	Of Joy & Sorrow	Burnt Toast Vinyl
2002	Denison Witmer Live	Burnt Toast Vinyl
2002	Philadelphia Songs	Burnt Toast Vinyl, Bad Taste Records (2004 re-release)
2003	Recovered	Fugitive Recordings
2005	The River Bends ...And Flows into the Sea	Bad Taste Records
2005	Are You a Dreamer?	The Militia Group
2008	Carry the Weight	The Militia Group
2012	The Ones Who Wait	Asthmatic Kitty Records, Mono Vs Stereo (2011 limited release)
2013	Denison Witmer	Asthmatic Kitty Records
2020	American Foursquare	Asthmatic Kitty Records
2020	Lancaster County (Single)	Asthmatic Kitty Records
2025	Anything At All	Asthmatic Kitty Records
