= Safe Away =

Studio album by Denison Witmer
- Released: 1998
- Recorded: late 1997
- Genre: Indie pop
- Label: Independently released
- Producer: Don Peris

Denison Witmer chronology
My Luck, My Love (1995)	Safe Away (1998)	River Bends EP (1999)

Professional ratings
Review scores
Source	Rating
Allmusic	link

Safe Away is an album by Denison Witmer. It was self-released in 1998, and re-released on the Burnt Toast Vinyl label on January 16, 2002.

== Track listing ==
1. "Steven" - 2:28
2. "Breathe in This Life" - 3:09
3. "Over My Head" - 2:48
4. "This and That" - 1:57
5. "Closer to the Sun" - 3:15
6. "What Will Stay?" - 2:17
7. "Miles" - 2:26
8. "Dain" - 3:47
9. "Los Angeles" - 2:14
10. "Around Everything" - 3:20
11. "I Would Call You Now" -3:43
12. "Sarah's Bridge" - 0:58
13. "I Won't Leave" - 3:35

The re-release of Safe Away on Burnt Toast Vinyl includes three bonus tracks:

1. "Broken" - 3:20
2. "Say You'll Stick Around" - 4:46
3. "Meant to Be" - 6:36

== Personnel ==
- Denison Witmer - vocals, guitar
- Don Peris - producer, guitar
