= Philadelphia Songs =

Studio album by Denison Witmer
- Released: September 24, 2002
- Genre: Indie pop
- Label: Burnt Toast Vinyl
- Producer: Denison Witmer, The Six Parts Seven, Scott French

Denison Witmer chronology
Of Joy and Sorrow (2001)	Philadelphia Songs (2002)	Denison Witmer Live (2002)

Professional ratings
Review scores
Source	Rating
Allmusic	link

Philadelphia Songs is an album by Denison Witmer. It was recorded at his home in Philadelphia and at Soundgun Studios. It was released in the United States on Burnt Toast Vinyl on September 24, 2002, and in Europe on Bad Taste Records on April 19, 2004.

== Track listing ==
1. "Sets of Keys" - 3:27
2. "I Won't Let You Down" - 4:22
3. "24 Turned 25" - 2:06
4. "Leaving Philadelphia (Arriving in Seattle)" - 3:13
5. "Chestnut Hill" - 4:50
6. "Stations" - 4:14
7. "Do I Really Have To?" - 2:37
8. "Remember the Things You Have Seen" - 3:02
9. "Saint Cecilla (Ode to Music)" - 3:20

== Personnel ==
- Denison Witmer - vocals, guitar, producer, engineer
- The Six Parts Seven - producer, guest musicians
- Scott French - producer, engineer
- Edan Cohen - mixer, engineer
