= This Thread Is a Green Street =

2024 song by The Innocence Mission

Single by The Innocence Mission

from the album Midwinter Swimmers
- Released: September 3, 2024
- Length: 2:57
- Label: Bella Union; Thérèse Records
- Songwriters: Karen Peris; Don Peris
- Producer: The Innocence Mission

The Innocence Mission singles chronology
"The Brothers William Said" (2020)	"This Thread Is a Green Street" (2024)	"Midwinter Swimmers" (2024)

Music video
- "This Thread Is a Green Street" on YouTube

"This Thread Is a Green Street" is a single by American band The Innocence Mission, released on September 3, 2024, as the first single from their thirteenth studio album, Midwinter Swimmers. The song was written by Karen and Don Peris, and is the only song on the album co-written by Don. The track was composed while their children were studying at college, and was inspired by Karen's memories of walking down streets with her children when they were young. She said these memories were "like doorways to possibility and just the joy of being alive."

The song received positive reviews from music journalists upon release, with writers comparing it to the work of Galaxie 500, Mazzy Star, and The Mamas & the Papas. They also said Karen's voice was the most evocative aspect of the song. Karen also created an animated music video for the track.

== Composition and recording ==
The song was written by Karen Peris alongside her husband Don. It is the only track on Midwinter Swimmers to be co-written by Don, as Karen is the sole credited composer for every other song on the album. Karen included it on a list of the five best songs created by the band.

The track was composed while the couple's children were studying at college, with Karen saying the song is about "how love can transcend distance". Lyrically, it was inspired by the "transportive quality" evoked by objects and scenes found in everyday life. Karen elaborated that while walking in her neighborhood, she would walk along roads she traversed with her children when they were young, and said she felt as though the "landscape is full of doorways to those memories, and like doorways to possibility and just the joy of being alive." The lyric of the song describes our connection to one another in spite of the distance between us, with Karen noting the "different kinds of lines that run through the world", specifically street maps, subway lines, telephone lines and lines of music. She elaborated that "these different kinds of lines are really just visible and audible signals of our deeper connections with each other."

Karen related this lyrical concept of connectiveness to the recording of the song, saying the band were seeking to "find the half-remembered beauty of sing-alongs of our 1970s childhoods." The track took a relatively long time to record, in comparison to most other songs on the album. It features distinctive multi-tracked harmonies from Karen, an unusual trait in the band's discography. The backing vocals were recorded using GarageBand. Karen said the backing vocals "gave the song an atmosphere that seemed to fit what we'd been thinking of, so we just kept going forward with that until it was done." She said she enjoyed recording the song, because it felt "kind of elusive, in a good way", noting the band are "always searching for the right ingredients for a song to be able to have an atmosphere that one could enter into."

== Release and promotion ==
"This Thread Is a Green Street" was issued as the first single from Midwinter Swimmers, as a one-track digital download and streaming single on September 3, 2024. Karen directed an animated music video for the song, which was released that same day. BrooklynVegan described the video as Karen using "ideas of sewing, stitching together backgrounds from maps, cloth swatches as the world of doorways and a photo of the 1964 World's Fair taken by her father. There are people moving through them, along with lyrics that appear as diagrammed sentences. It's a video that is as evocative of that early-'70s feel Peris describes – not unlike what she imagined on 2021 solo album A Song Is Way Above the Lawn – and you could imagine this as part of a PBS children's series back then."

== Critical reception ==
The song received positive reviews from music critics upon release. Paste and Pitchfork both listed it as one of the best songs released that week. BrooklynVegan called the song "gorgeous", while Stereogum said it "casts a dreamy, pastoral spell". Goldflakepaint said the track was "subtly captivating", and praised Karen's vocals. They likened her voice to "a dewy fog on a bright morning, it feels both gleaming and like something unearthed, glitter in the soil." KLOF Magazine praised the band's performance and the production on the song, saying the track encompasses "all of their influences in one three-minute ball". Despite comparing it to the work of Galaxie 500, Mazzy Star, and The Mamas & the Papas, their writer went on to say that Karen's voice was the most evocative aspect of the song, describing her voice as "high and delicate and persuasive, always threatening to lose itself in the mix and always reappearing intact."

Silent Radio also highlighted Karen's voice as the most distinctive characteristic of the track, and said the song perfectly "sets the mood" for the album. They said that in the track's "final minute, there is a magical moment where the veil is lifted, piano comes in while the guitar and vocals soar, though not in a histrionic way. It is a much more understated change but it creates a spine-tingling effect." The Pinnacle Gazette called the song "enchanting", also noting influences from The Mamas & the Papas in the song's vocal harmonies. They went on to praise the band's songwriting, noting their "lyrical craftsmanship ... as they weave everyday observations with unexpected metaphors."

== Credits and personnel ==
Credits adapted from the description section of the song's official YouTube music video.

- Karen Peris – vocals, nylon string guitar, pump organ, Hammond organ
- Don Peris – harmony vocals, acoustic and electric guitars, drums
- Mike Bitts – upright bass
