= One Star Hotel =

One Star Hotel was a Philadelphia-based rock band fronted by singer-songwriter Steve Yutzy-Burkey. The band also included Daryl Hirsch, Alec Meltzer, and Rick Sieber. Steel guitarist Mike "Slo Mo" Brenner contributed to the band's recordings, an arrangement and sonic result similar to Bruce Kaphan's work with American Music Club. In a city best known for its soul and R & B artists, One Star Hotel stood out because of a sound more reminiscent of alternative country or Americana music.

Originally called Stereo Field, the band changed its name to One Star Hotel before the release of its first, self-titled album in 2003. They kept the name Stereo Field for their independent record label. A second disc, Good Morning, West Gordon was released in November 2004, garnering favorable reviews in a number of American newspapers, magazines, and web-based music sites. Tom Moon of The Philadelphia Inquirer characterized Yutzy-Burkey's musical style as "convey[ing] torn-apartnesss without even trying... transforming those overworked three chords into something almost magical again." Another reviewer, John Takiff described One Star Hotel as "the sonic equivalent of an Edward Hopper painting."

Comparisons to the Chicago-based Wilco (one of alt-country's most popular bands) often dogged One Star Hotel, although the comparisons owed less to derivativeness than to similar musical roots in the classic rock sound of The Band, Neil Young, and Big Star. One Star Hotel opened for Wilco on a tour of the Netherlands in the fall of 2005. Following the tour, a brief message announcing that One Star Hotel was "packing it in" appeared on the band's website.

== Discography ==
- One Star Hotel (Stereo Field Recordings, 2003)
- Good Morning, West Gordon (Stereo Field Recordings, 2005)
