= A Song Is Way Above the Lawn =

Studio album by Karen Peris
- Released: October 8, 2021
- Length: 28:48
- Label: Bella Union

Karen Peris chronology
Violet (2012)	A Song Is Way Above the Lawn (2021)

A Song Is Way Above the Lawn is the second solo album by Karen Peris, lead vocalist and songwriter of American alternative rock band the Innocence Mission. The album was released worldwide on October 8, 2021, via Bella Union.

== Composition and style ==
The album was written over a period of seven years, and is her first solo album since 2012's Violet. Peris described A Song Is Way Above the Lawn as "an illustrated album, for kids or for anyone who might like songs about walking under trees in a city, seeing dogs from a car window, reading, encountering gentle lions in the public library, listening to the first sounds of the morning, looking at stars, thinking about giraffes, and elephants, and the beauty of the world, the possibility contained in a tiny moment of a day."

The lyrics to "I Would Sing Along" are inspired by an interview Peris heard on NPR regarding the Elephant Listening Project, and their acoustic biologists who study the sub-sonic singing of African elephants. In the song, Peris sings: "In the low light, in the lowest notes/ I hear him singing sweetly" and "An elephant sings someone to sleep/ And I would sing with him." A writer for NPR complimented the song's production, saying the track "nestles into the corners of beauty, articulating images and ideas just out of view" before saying: "But then drums, upright bass and strings sweep the rhythm to a windy bluster, in a heart-swelling full-band arrangement that hasn't been heard on an Innocence Mission album in quite some time."

The album contains musical contributions from Peris's husband Don, as well as their two children, Drew and Anna. Elaborating on the album's content, Peris said:

I like that it's possible to re-travel some of the wide open expanse of childhood imagination and wonder. The thing is, I don't really feel that far away from those places even now, and I'm sure that's a universal thought. The moments I'm telling about in the songs, and the wonder and the curiosity – I still feel so much of it, just as anyone does. I didn't want to be an adult saying to a child, 'This is how you feel'. It's more like saying, just as a person talking with another person, 'Isn't this how we all feel', and isn't that a mystery of life, too, that we are all so connected? So, most of the songs are written in the first person.

— Karen Peris, via Stereogum.

== Release and promotion ==
"I Would Sing Along" was the first song released from the album. Its music video premiered on YouTube on July 19, 2021, and features hand-drawn animation created by Peris. The album was released worldwide on October 8 via Bella Union on CD, LP and digital download. LP editions of the record were pressed on green vinyl. A music video for "Superhero" was released on YouTube on September 6.

== Critical reception ==
Professional ratings
Review scores
Source	Rating
AllMusic	4/5 stars
Mojo	4/5 stars

The album received positive reviews upon release. AllMusic compared it to Now the Day Is Over, the Innocence Mission's 2004 studio record, saying the album "speaks to listeners of all ages, as it rarely if ever condescends while delving into relatable topics". Their writer went on to compliment the "deceptively efficient arrangements" before summarizing: "Almost like an antidote to programmed, singalong kidz pop, A Song Is Way Above the Lawn feels restorative and may even leave some misty-eyed."Brooklyn Vegan dubbed it the album of the week and complimented its lyricism, saying the lyrics are "full of wonder and small details, and are often about those details." They summarized by advising listeners to not be "put off by the 'kids' angle", saying the songs have "a childlike air but are imbued with such poetic grace that there is zero pandering, zero patronizing. Add to that the way Karen writes melodies, the way she plays the piano, and her gorgeous, fragile voice, and all the songs have a complex, satisfying happy-sad air to them. Even the ones about giraffes and elephants." Mojo also gave the album a positive review, complimenting the lyricism and musical performances and saying: "What could be a twee exploration of wonder is instead an intense reverie." Spectrum Culture said the album "feels like a gift to be cherished for years to come. Short and sweet – not even reaching the half hour mark – A Song Is Way Above the Lawn is beautiful, heartwarming and a joy to experience."

== Track listing ==
All songs written by Karen Peris.

A Song Is Way Above the Lawn – Vinyl edition
No.	Title	Length
1.	"Superhero"	3:05
2.	"To the Library"	2:51
3.	"I Would Sing Along"	3:27
4.	"For a Giraffe"	2:42
5.	"This Is a Song in Wintertime"	2:23
6.	"Map for the Orange Daylight"	3:48
7.	"Sister Birds"	2:18
8.	"George in the Car"	2:41
9.	"A Song Is Way Above the Lawn"	3:14
10.	"Flowers"	2:19
Total length:		28:48

Note

- Digital editions of the album switch the order of "For a Giraffe" and "George in the Car".

== Credits and personnel ==
Credits adapted from Bandcamp.

- Karen Peris – vocals, piano, electric guitar, bass guitar, nylon-string guitar, accordion, melodica, pump organ, recording, mixing, artwork and illustration
- Don Peris – high electric guitar ("Superhero" and "A Song Is Way Above the Lawn"), drums and upright bass, recording and mixing
- Drew Peris – violin ("Superhero", "I Would Sing Along" and "For a Giraffe")
- Anna Peris – viola ("Superhero", "I Would Sing Along" and "For a Giraffe")

== Charts ==
Chart (2021)	Peak position
UK Americana Albums (Official Charts)	31
