= Now the Day Is Over =

Now the Day is Over

Studio album by The Innocence Mission
- Released: November 9, 2004
- Recorded: August 2004
- Genre: Alternative rock; dream pop
- Length: 29:58
- Label: Badman Recording Co.
- Producer: The Innocence Mission

The Innocence Mission chronology
Befriended (2003)	Now the Day is Over (2004)	We Walked in Song (2007)

Now the Day Is Over is the seventh studio album by American alternative rock band The Innocence Mission, released by Badman Recording Co. on November 9, 2004. A collection of standards, traditional and classical works performed as lullabies, the album was recorded in August 2004 in the band's home studio. A portion of proceeds from sales of the album are donated to charitable organisations, including Catholic Relief Services.

== Composition and style ==
The album's track listing is derived from the songs Karen Peris sang to her young children. Among the covers featured from movies are "Stay Awake" from Mary Poppins, "Over the Rainbow" from The Wizard of Oz, "Moon River" from Breakfast at Tiffany's, and "Edelweiss" from The Sound of Music. The record features one original song, "My Love Goes With You", and two from previous releases: "Moon River" from The Lakes of Canada (1999) and "It Is Well with My Soul" from Christ Is My Hope (2000). South Korean editions of the album, released by Pastel Music, contain two bonus tracks from Christ Is My Hope: "500 Miles" and ""Beautiful Savior". All four songs were remastered for this album.

== Critical reception ==
Professional ratings
Review scores
Source	Rating
AllMusic	3.5/5 stars

Australian radio station Kinderling Kids Radio described the album as "delightful" and "full of sweet sounds to send you off to sleep." AllMusic called the record "an absolutely beguiling collection of standards", describing it as "a benefit collection of cover songs that are all centered reverie akin to dreaming. Calling them all lullabies would be stretching a little bit, but the presentations are such that they might as well be." They described "My Love Goes With You" as "perhaps the most beautiful and tender song on the outing", before summarizing that the album "could have been merely a curiosity piece, a curious addition to a mysterious catalog by a singular group. Instead, it is nothing less than a wondrous little gem."

Treble Zine rated it an 'Album of the Week' while also describing "My Love Goes With You" as "one of the best songs on the album", saying that it "fits in nicely with such great classic and traditional numbers. To be able to write a song that not only stands up to, but almost outshines these tracks is astounding." They went on to praise the quality of the band's performance and production, saying "They may be covers, but as 'Hallelujah' is now more associated with Jeff Buckley than almost everyone but Leonard Cohen, so most of these songs should now be associated with Innocence Mission."

== Track listing ==
No.	Title	Writer(s)	Length
1.	"Stay Awake"	Richard M. Sherman; Robert B. Sherman	3:24
2.	"Over the Rainbow"	Harold Arlen; Yip Harburg	2:55
3.	"What a Wonderful World"	George David Weiss; Bob Thiele	2:54
4.	"Moon River"	Henry Mancini; Johnny Mercer	2:48
5.	"Somewhere a Star Shines for Everyone"	Howard Blake	1:37
6.	"Prelude in A"	Frédéric Chopin	2:01
7.	"Once Upon a Summertime"	Eddy Marnay; Eddie Barclay; Michel LeGrand; Mercer	2:13
8.	"My Love Goes With You"	Karen Peris	2:52
9.	"Edelweiss"	Richard Rodgers; Oscar Hammerstein II	2:16
10.	"Sonata No. 8"	Ludwig van Beethoven	1:53
11.	"Bye-Lo"	Traditional	1:13
12.	"It Is Well with My Soul"	Horatio Spafford; Philip Bliss	1:19
13.	"Now the Day Is Over"	Sabine Baring-Gould; Joseph Barnby	2:39

Now the Day Is Over – South Korean bonus tracks
No.	Title	Writer(s)	Length
14.	"500 Miles"	Traditional	2:50
15.	"Beautiful Savior"	Traditional	3:01
Total length:			35:49

Notes

- The album's liner notes originally credited "Once Upon a Summertime" as being written by "Barclay/LeGrand/Mercer". Eddy Marnay has subsequently been identified as the song's original French lyricist, with his work then being translated into English by Johnny Mercer.
- "500 Miles" and "Beautiful Savior" are both listed as being 'Traditional'. This version of "500 Miles" has been credited as being written by Hedy West, with a 1961 copyright held by Atzal Music, Inc. "Beautiful Savior" is based on the traditional hymn "Fairest Lord Jesus", with various hymnals attributing the composition to either Richard Storrs Willis or Joseph Seiss.

== Personnel ==
Credits adapted from the album liner notes.

- Mike Bitts – background vocals and double bass
- Ken Heitmueller – mastering
- Don Peris – background vocals, acoustic, bass, electric and nylon-string guitars, recording, mixing and photography
- Karen Peris – lead and background vocals, piano, guitar, field pump organ, cover and interior artwork
- Donovan Witmer – photography
