= Hello I Feel the Same =

Studio album by The Innocence Mission
- Released: October 16, 2015
- Genres: Alternative rock, indie folk, indie pop
- Length: 33:47
- Label: Korda
- Producer: The Innocence Mission

The Innocence Mission chronology
My Room in the Trees (2010)	Hello I Feel the Same (2015)	Sun on the Square (2018)

Hello I Feel the Same is the tenth studio album by American alternative band The Innocence Mission. It was released on October 16, 2015, via Korda Records, a cooperative record label founded by The Ocean Blue, a band with whom the Innocence Mission formed a "long and deep friendship that goes back to some of each band's first shows in Pennsylvania and their major label debut records on Sire and A&M". An edition on translucent green vinyl was released from early January 2016. It is their first studio album since 2010's My Room in the Trees, making five years the longest gap between studio albums in their career.

== Release and promotion ==
To promote the album, The Innocence Mission embarked on their first live shows since 2004, performing as the opening act on select dates of a tour by The Ocean Blue. The band also performed a live session for WXPN's Key Studios. In February 2016, they performed a 40-minute set at the Roots & Blues music festival held at The Chameleon Club in Lancaster, Pennsylvania. An outtake from the My Room in the Trees sessions, "Trip", was released as a non-album single in July 2016, and features the band's original drummer, Steve Brown.

Professional ratings
Review scores
Source	Rating
AllMusic	3.5/5 stars
Knoxville News Sentinel	(positive)

== Track listing ==
All songs written by Karen Peris except "Barcelona", written by Don and Karen Peris

No.	Title	Length
1.	"Hello I Feel the Same"	2:12
2.	"Tom on the Boulevard"	3:44
3.	"Washington Field Trip"	2:58
4.	"When the One Flowered Suitcase"	3:22
5.	"Barcelona" (Instrumental)	2:30
6.	"State Park"	3:12
7.	"Fred Rogers"	3:14
8.	"Blue and Yellow"	3:02
9.	"Daily"	3:07
10.	"Spring Is Written on Your Door"	2:43
11.	"The Color Green"	3:41

Japanese edition
No.	Title	Length
12.	"At Sea"	3:10
Total length:		36:57

== Personnel ==
The Innocence Mission

- Karen Peris – vocals, guitars, piano, field organ, bass harmonica, tambourine, bass (1, 11), artwork, design
- Don Peris – guitars, drums, bass (3, 10), backing vocals
- Mike Bitts – upright bass (2, 4, 6, 9), electric bass (7)

Additional musicians

- Anna Peris – viola on "The Color Green"
- Drew Peris – violin on "The Color Green"

Technical

- Carl Saff – mastering

== Release history ==
Region	Date	Label	Format(s)	Catalog #
Worldwide	October 16, 2015	Korda Records	CD; Digital download	KORDA014
Japan	December 12, 2015	P-Vine Records	CD; Digital download	PCD-24455
Worldwide	January 15, 2016	Korda Records	LP vinyl	KORDA014
