= See You Tomorrow (album) =

Studio album by the Innocence Mission
- Released: January 17, 2020
- Length: 34:57
- Labels: Bella Union; Thérèse Records
- Producer: The Innocence Mission

The Innocence Mission chronology
Sun on the Square (2018)	See You Tomorrow (2020)	Midwinter Swimmers (2024)

See You Tomorrow is the twelfth studio album by American Alternative rock band the Innocence Mission, released on January 17, 2020, by Bella Union in Europe and Australia and by Thérèse Records in the United States and Canada.

== Recording and composition ==
See You Tomorrow was recorded in the Peris' home, namely their basement and dining room. Lead vocalist and composer Karen wrote and sang on ten of the album's eleven songs and played the majority of the instruments, while her husband Don sang lead on the song he composed, "Mary Margaret in Mid-Air". Bassist Mike Bitts performs upright bass on four tracks.

Stereogum said themes of "Love, connection, community, and understanding" are "at the core of the album, one that is steeped in awe and wonder, intense longing, sadness, and joy; a rich sequence of songs that attempt to describe the essence of what makes us human." Folk Radio UK said it sees the band thematically evolve from their preceding album, 2018's Sun on the Square, by "touching on the major changes that happen in the life of a family", with Karen elaborating: "Great love of course contains great anxiety, for the safety and health of the loved ones, for one's own ability to be a good enough helper and companion, for the future. And the intense desire to hold the present moment of togetherness, at the very least to store it up in vivid detail, so that it cannot be lost at all." She said the lyrics of the opening track, "The Brothers Williams Said," were inspired by the "sense of misunderstanding that can happen to people who have a quiet nature." She conceded: "I struggle with being able to find words in conversation, so I'm always grateful to have the opportunity to have a conversation with people in songs." Stereogum described "On Your Side" as a "lovely and understated track about how those who have passed on still live beside us," quoting the lyric "In my dream, I would be in Paris with my mom. In cafes, she would sip coffee; she would be smiling on/ She'd say, 'I have never let you out of my sight. I have not gone.'"

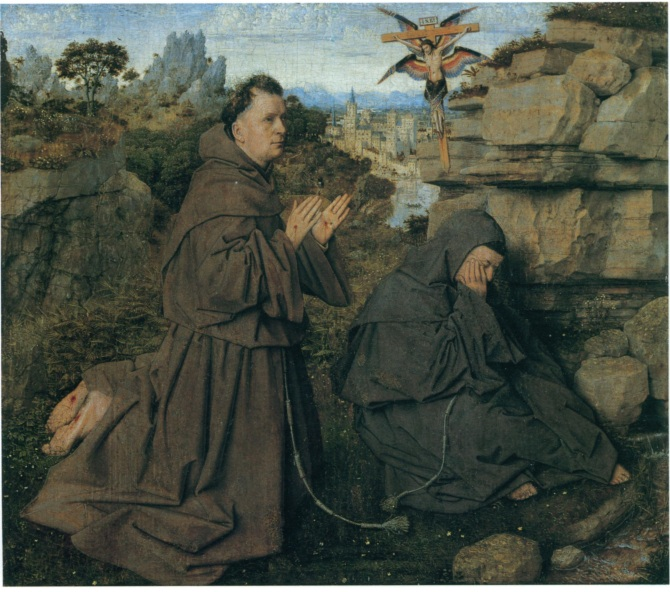
Jan van Eyck's Saint Francis Receiving the Stigmata (c. 1430–32) inspired the lyrics to the song "St. Francis and the Future"

The lyrics of "St. Francis and the Future" were inspired by a Jan van Eyck painting. Karen explained: "A few years ago, during a visit to a museum with my children, I saw his painting Saint Francis Receiving the Stigmata. The song 'St. Francis and the Future' was inspired by my memory of discovering this painting because, during our visit, a tour guide had us look at a multitude of details using a large magnifying glass he had with him. In the background of the painting, there is this little town that most people wouldn't even notice because they would be too busy looking at the foreground. On closer inspection, you end up perceiving not only birds and animals but also the life of a small town. This painting not only tells us about this mystical image but also evokes a whole disappearing world. As often, one thought provoked another, and this day in the museum, I began to imagine my children after we were gone, to imagine them looking at photos of our family and dwelling on the details of the backgrounds that were ultimately the reality of our lives. This was a strange moment in the museum: me discovering the imaginary life of a village from the past while thinking about the future of my children. This method of Van Eyck to focus on little details speaks to me a lot, because I believe the more we talk about the small moments in life, the more meaningful they become for others."

"John as Well" was the first song written for the record. Karen said that its lyrics relate to "wanting to really know other people and to be truly known by another person, and the limitations of language, especially when it comes to conversation. I think it represents the whole album. The questions about connections to other people and the possibilities of communication and internal lives."

== Release and promotion ==
The album was released on January 17, 2020, by Bella Union in Europe. "On Your Side", "This Boat", "The Brothers William Said" and "St. Francis and the Future" were all issued on streaming platforms prior to the release of the album. A music video for "On Your Side", created by Karen, was also released on YouTube.

== Critical reception ==
Professional ratings
Aggregate scores
Source	Rating
Album of the Year	74/100
Metacritic	78/100
Review scores
Source	Rating
AllMusic	4/5 stars
Classic Pop	3.5/4 stars
Loud and Quiet	8/10
Mojo	4/5 stars
The Philadelphia Inquirer	3.5/5 stars
Rolling Stone	3.5/5 stars
The Skinny	3/5 stars
Spectrum Culture	3.5/5 stars
Uncut	3.5/5 stars

The album received generally positive reviews upon release. At Metacritic, which assigns a normalized rating out of 100 to reviews from mainstream critics, it received an average score of 78 out of 100, indicating "generally favorable reviews". NPR listed it as the second best album released that week, highlighting "The Brothers William Said" as its best song. Stereogum dubbed it their album of the week, saying: "Warmth seeps in from every corner; little background sounds make it clear that the Perises are inviting you into their home and their slow-moving world. [The album is] breathtakingly intimate and delicate. But The Innocence Mission are also exacting musicians and producers, and nothing else about See You Tomorrow suggests it was made at home. Every instrument is crisp and precise. ... Every sound lends the music a reverence, a hush that lets Karen's voice rise to the front". Timothy Monger of AllMusic described the album as "ethereal", saying that although the album "does little to deviate" from the band's established sound, he said that "it's hard to find too much fault in that. The group's signature sound is a home-built concept, gently refined over their three decades together, and their steady cultivation of it is their gift to the world." He said the album "offers a bit more experimentation than some of their recent releases", while highlighting the quality of songwriting and production, summarizing: "It's these little details and the quality of the writing that help push the boundaries of what otherwise sounds like a quintessential Innocence Mission album."

Writing in The Philadelphia Inquirer, Steve Klinge described the album as "lovely, understated" and praised Karen's lyrics as being "full of natural elements—sun, stars, clouds, trees, fields—and they continually return to sharp observations that seek to capture and retain moments." He also highlighted her voice and Don's guitar work, saying: "Her voice is wistful and introspective, with a soft edge that still recalls Harriet Wheeler. Her husband's fingerpicked acoustic guitar anchors tracks like the airy bossa nova 'On Your Side' and the ebb-and-flow of 'St. Francis and the Future'. That crystalline clarity allows the songs that feature more layered arrangements, such as the gorgeous closer 'I Would Be There', to blossom". He summarized by describing See You Tomorrow as "an album about, and full of, care, restraint, and love." Loud and Quiet called the record an "introspection of people and how life's daunting uncertainty impacts the love and anxiety attached to those we cherish. It's a reflection of chronology, echoing where and what we've come from whilst simultaneously gazing at the winding road lying ominously ahead." They summarized by describing it as "a body of work that envisions grandiose proportion, sonically embodying the complexity of what makes us unique and innately human." The Skinny characterized the album as "slightly more piano-heavy furrow than before", describing it "music made for people who are not quick to dismiss something if it sounds downbeat." Despite this, they called the album "majestic, transcendant [sic], entrancing, transfixing. You're lifted out of yourself as if visited by angels. Other times, such as on album opener 'The Brothers Williams Said', you want to give them a hug, tell them it will be okay, ask them if they need a nice cup of tea. It's serious, is what we're saying; not music for people who want a quick two-second fix of wonderfulness. You have to live with this. Admire its prettiness from afar. Let it work its magic on you."

Brooklyn Vegan included the album at number 16 on their list of the best albums of 2020.

== Track listing ==
All tracks are written by Karen Peris, except track 9 by Don Peris.

See You Tomorrow track listing
No.	Title	Length
1.	"The Brothers Williams Said"	3:30
2.	"On Your Side"	3:34
3.	"Movie"	2:35
4.	"We Don't Know How to Say Why"	3:50
5.	"St. Francis and the Future"	2:33
6.	"At Lake Maureen"	1:58
7.	"John As Well"	4:19
8.	"This Boat"	2:35
9.	"Mary Margaret in Mid-Air"	3:01
10.	"Stars That Fall Away from Us"	2:40
11.	"I Would Be There"	4:16

== Personnel ==
Credits adapted from Bandcamp.

- Mike Bitts – upright bass (tracks 2, 7, 9 and 11)
- Don Peris – vocals, guitars, drums and timpani
- Karen Peris – vocals, guitars, piano, pump organ, accordion, melodica, low harmonica, electric bass guitar, strings keyboard and mellotron

== Charts ==
Chart (2020)	Peak position
UK Americana Albums (Official Charts)	8

== See also ==
- List of 2020 albums
