= Sun on the Square =

Studio album by the Innocence Mission
- Released: June 29, 2018
- Genres: Folk pop; chamber folk
- Length: 34:39
- Labels: Badman Recording Co.; Bella Union; P-Vine Records
- Producer: The Innocence Mission

The Innocence Mission chronology
Hello I Feel the Same (2015)	Sun on the Square (2018)	See You Tomorrow (2020)

Sun on the Square is the eleventh studio album by American alternative band the Innocence Mission, released in the United States via Badman Recording Co. and in Japan by P-Vine Records on June 29, 2018, with a European release following one week later on Bella Union. The record is available for streaming via Badman's official SoundCloud channel.

== Composition and style ==
The band's lead vocalist and songwriter Karen Peris described the record as a "snapshot of a significant moment" in her life, as well as that of her husband Don, the band's lead guitarist. She said that lyrical content was predominantly inspired by "our son and daughter being older teenagers, which can mean possibility and hope for them but also the sadness of separation and my changing role as a mom, and the intensified awareness of the preciousness of life. So there is a lot about change on the album, and also about communication and the universal feelings of loneliness, but also of connectedness to other people through all of these shared feelings and experiences."

Karen said of "Green Bus": "I've always liked color words. They seem to have an ability all on their own to make a visual world, especially the word green [which naturally makes you think of trees and grass and various aspects of nature]. The feeling of the song is a longing to give something of worth, and searching for that thing. And the [word] 'bus' may have come about because of the guitar rhythm I was playing, which maybe has a circular motion, but also just of the idea of a quiet place to view the city from, and to think one's thoughts and decide where to go next." She also said that "Shadow of the Pines" was inspired by "the absence of a loved one, through change of some kind. Missing that person. Communicating over distance and holding that person in thought. So, this is a kind of lyric I seem to write repeatedly, in different ways, because of things that have happened and that loom in the future."

The album's title track was musically inspired by the work of Astrud Gilberto, while Karen said its lyrics were inspired by her "admiration for someone going out into the world bravely, and in kindness: the possibility for one person to be a light in the world—that love will prevail over fear." "Light of Winter" is a re-recording of "From the Trains", a song from the band's 2017 EP The Snow on Pi Day. Karen explained the difference between the two recordings: "When we recorded it for The Snow on Pi Day, it was mostly a guitar song, but I started playing it on piano after that and both [Don and I] heard some things that could be different. It was nice to be able to go back to that song and add the piano, pump organ and other things to make the interludes bigger, but to keep the verse as having all the space around Don's electric guitar part." She additionally said of the title change: "We were always calling it 'Light of Winter', which felt like the natural title because of the refrain, so we just renamed it, especially because it felt different enough from the first recording to be its own thing." "Star of Land and Sea" features lead vocals from Don Peris.

== Release and promotion ==
Sun on the Square is their first release issued on Bella Union: a British independent record label founded by former Cocteau Twins guitarist and keyboardist Simon Raymonde. Karen and Don formed a friendship with Raymonde after Karen was asked to contribute vocals to "The Places We've Been"—a track on Lost Horizons' 2017 album Ojalá. The album was released on vinyl, with Bella Union in Europe pressing the record on transparent vinyl, while North American copies – pressed by Badman Recording Co. – were made using translucent green vinyl. "Shadow of the Pines" was the first song previewed from the album, after it appeared on episode 167 of The Big Takeover on April 2.

Lead single "Green Bus" followed on April 19; it was premiered on GoldFlakePaint. Two animated music videos – for "Green Bus" and "Look Out from Your Window" – have been released in promotion of the album, both of which were illustrated by Karen. The latter song was issued as a one-track digital single via streaming services on May 31. In August, Karen and Don performed a live session for Paste, performing three songs from Sun on the Square: "Green Bus", "Light of Winter" and "Buildings in Flower". In November, they performed two of the aforementioned songs – as well as "Tomorrow on the Runway", from 2003's Befriended – during a feature for NPR Music's Tiny Desk Concerts series.

== Critical reception ==
Professional ratings
Aggregate scores
Source	Rating
Metacritic	(77/100)
Review scores
Source	Rating
AllMusic	3.5/5 stars
Loud and Quiet	9/10
Mojo	4/5 stars
Paste	(81/100)
Q	4/5 stars
RTÉ.ie	4/5 stars
Uncut	4/5 stars

The album received positive reviews upon release. At Metacritic, which assigns a normalized rating out of 100 to reviews from mainstream critics, it received an average score of 77 out of 100, based on 6 publications, indicating "generally favorable reviews".

Several publications praised the quality of the production, including Rock'n'Reel, which said: "There's not a note out of place amid the album's beautifully crafted ethereal sadness." Similarly, Loud and Quiet said: "Records like Sun on the Square don't come around very often. ... Where The Innocence Mission has previously been a poster band for the slow-burning record, Sun on the Square wills you to cling on and not let go from the very beginning. It hunts out the curious minutiae of being alive, saves them and makes them spectacular. In an already strong back catalogue, this album feels like the crown jewel." Other publications commended Karen's songwriting as well, particularly her lyrics. Paste said: "When you scan the lyrics for Sun on the Square, you realize just how often [Karen] is posing a question. ... Those questions give [the record] an engaging and poetic vibe that only enhances its sonic aesthetic. All told, the album feels like a hand-crafted work of art, put together carefully by its creators, charmingly imperfect but much preferred over a mass-produced piece with no stitch out of place, and no soul to match. Credit Karen and Don Peris, who've spun gold out of simplicity for so many years." The Sunday Times wrote: "[They may] have been doing the same thing for nearly 30 years. But that's OK, because they do extremely delicate late-1960s/early-1970s folk rock as well as anyone ever has."

Numerous writers complimented the arrangements found on the album. Timothy Monger of AllMusic said: "Since paring down their already-hushed folk pop sound to a mostly acoustic, drum-less trio in 1997, the band has lived comfortably within the parameters of their tonal world, painting different textures here and there, but otherwise consistently delivering a familiar version of their pastoral chamber folk with each release." Despite this, they went on to say: "The arrangements on [Sun on the Square] are somewhat denser and more intricate than on any of the band's previous outings, relying on rich string arrangements, horns, reverberating piano thrums and even a handful of clamorous drum parts." Elizabeth Klisiewicz of The Big Takeover also complimented the "meticulous" arrangements, and described the entire record as "beautiful". London in Stereo called Sun on the Square a "stunning collection of beautifully vulnerable folk songs, ... thanks to typically subtle picking and increasingly orchestrated and gently cinematic accompaniment. Peris’ effortless storytelling once again plays centre stage, weaving through bucolic scenes, touching on love and loss yet always maintaining a blissful hope that ensures the record has the moments of sun its title suggests. The band's first effort for Bella Union is simply gorgeous; mission accomplished."

RTÉ.ie said that: "There may not be a purer sound in pop right now than The Innocence Mission. [They spin] a web of winsome beauty ... [Sun on the Square is] fragile, wispy and haunting orchestral folk without sounding tweely sadcore. Who knows what [Karen] is singing about on these delicate and enthralling songs, but there are moments here where The Innocence Mission sound like they're going to dissolve into the ether at any second. It makes them all the more powerful and beautiful." Mojo additionally commented on the quality of the album's lyrics, and the Peris' personal lives, saying: "[Their] albums have traced the faultlines of parenthood, until now ... Their teenage kids are leaving home. Everywhere, [Karen] Peris notes absence." They went on to call the album "exquisite". The Morton Report was generally positive, calling the album "dreamy". Uncut also praised Karen's vocals, saying that her voice was "at the fluttering heart of this album; her phrasing and tonal glides are as distinctive as those of Victoria Williams or Iris DeMent."

Paste included the album at number five on their list of the '10 Best Albums of June 2018', while it featured at number three in NPR's list of the top albums of June 2018. Similarly, the record topped the list on a Loud and Quiet feature called "July was a bit of a wasteland for new album releases – except for these 7 that we're rating".

== Track listing ==
All tracks are written by Karen Peris, except track 7 by Karen and Don Peris; track 8 by Don Peris.

No.	Title	Length
1.	"Records from Your Room"	2:46
2.	"Green Bus"	4:28
3.	"Look Out from Your Window"	3:21
4.	"Shadow of the Pines"	4:00
5.	"Buildings in Flower"	2:57
6.	"Sun on the Square"	3:27
7.	"Light of Winter"	3:53
8.	"Star of Land and Sea"	3:08
9.	"An Idea of Canoeing"	3:42
10.	"Galvanic"	2:37

== Personnel ==
Credits adapted from the liner notes of Sun on the Square.

- Mike Bitts – upright bass (tracks 3, 6, 7 and 9)
- Anna Peris – viola (tracks 3, 4 and 6)
- Don Peris – lead vocals (track 8), background vocals, guitars, drums, percussion, recording, production and mixing
- Drew Peris – violin (tracks 2 and 6)
- Karen Peris – lead and background vocals, guitars, piano, pump organ, glockenspiel, accordion, melodica, recording, production, mixing, artwork and sleeve design
- Carl Saff – mastering

== Charts ==
Chart (2018)	Peak position
UK Independent Albums (Official Charts)	45
UK Americana Albums (Official Charts)	9

== Release history ==
Region	Date	Format	Label	Catalog #	Ref.
North America	June 29, 2018	CD; LP; digital download	Badman Recording Co.	BRC–909	
Japan	June 29, 2018	CD; LP; digital download	P-Vine Records	PCD24742	
Europe	July 6, 2018	CD; LP; digital download	Bella Union	BELLA789	
