= The Innocence Mission (album) =

Studio album by the Innocence Mission
- Released: August 29, 1989
- Recorded: November 1988 – June 1989
- Genre: Alternative rock, folk rock, Christian rock
- Length: 46:33
- Label: A&M
- Producer: Larry Klein

The Innocence Mission chronology
Tending the Rose Garden (1986)	The Innocence Mission (1989)	Umbrella (1991)

Professional ratings
Review scores
Source	Rating
AllMusic	2.5/5 stars

The Innocence Mission is the debut studio album by the Innocence Mission. It was recorded in six months in several studios in Los Angeles, California, including the Kiva, Ocean Way Recording, and the Sound Castle. The album cover features the 1894 painting Impromptu Ball by Eva Roos. The album was re-released digitally on May 19, 2009, by A&M Records.

== Track listing ==
All tracks are written by Karen Peris, unless otherwise indicated.

No.	Title	Length
1.	"Paper Dolls" (Karen Peris, Don Peris)	1:21
2.	"Black Sheep Wall"	4:20
3.	"Surreal"	2:49
4.	"Curious"	2:48
5.	"Clear to You"	5:39
6.	"Mercy" (Karen Peris, Don Peris)	3:54
7.	"Broken Circle"	3:26
8.	"I Remember Me" (Karen Peris, Don Peris)	3:56
9.	"You Chase the Light"	3:40
10.	"Notebook" (Karen Peris, Don Peris)	4:36
11.	"Come Around and See Me" (Karen Peris, Don Peris)	4:53
12.	"Wonder of Birds"	3:16
13.	"Medjugorje" (Karen Peris, Don Peris)	1:55
Total length:		46:33
