= Recovered =

American behavioral health organization

- Type: Division
- Industry: Health Care
- Founded: 1944
- Headquarters: New York City, New York, U.S.
- Area served: Worldwide
- Services: Publishing, Behavioral Health, Healthcare Provider Ratings
- Website: recovered.org

Recovered (formerly known as the National Council on Alcoholism and Drug Dependence (NCADD)) is a behavioral health organization focused on alcoholism, drug addiction and the consequences of alcohol and other drug use.

== Overview ==
Recovered is an online platform for people seeking treatment for substance use disorder and other mental health conditions in the United States. Their directory lists over 15,000 treatment facilities across the country, including those offering residential inpatient care, outpatient programs, detox centers, and medication-assisted treatment options. They also offer resources for those seeking support groups or mental health counseling and are listed as a peer support resource by the Substance Abuse and Mental Health Services Administration (SAMHSA).

== History ==
In April 2021 the NCADD website was acquired by JBKM Ltd. In December 2021 the website was relaunched under its new brand name, Recovered. In July 2023, Recovered launched the "Recovered Trustscore", an independent rating system for rehab centers "designed to rank all rehab centers and healthcare providers listed on their site to ensure that visitors find access to the best treatment in their area for the specific substance use disorder or co-occurring condition they have."

== Information resources ==
Recovered provides resources on topics related to substance abuse, substance use disorder treatment, mental health, current affairs in healthcare, and others. All of their resources are fact-checked by a medical review team composed of healthcare professionals, addiction specialists, and counselors to ensure “that everything you read on our site is trustworthy and factual.” They do not offer medical, psychiatric, psychological, or physical health advice.

Resources created by Recovered have been cited on various healthcare websites such as Medical News Today, Mayo Clinic, WebMD, Indiana Primary Health Care Association, North Sure Health Department, SAMHSA, and others.

== Alcohol Awareness Month ==
Recovered promotes Alcohol Awareness Month, which takes place in April each year. Created by NCADD in 1987, the campaign is intended to increase community awareness around issues relating to alcohol abuse, reduce stigma, and provide tools for people seeking help for alcohol addiction. Recovered provides resources to various organizations such as health departments and educational institutes looking to support Alcohol Awareness Month throughout the country.

== See also ==
- List of Temperance organizations
