= Are You a Dreamer? =

Studio album by Denison Witmer
- Released: July 26, 2005
- Recorded: Lancaster, Pennsylvania
- Genre: Indie pop, Indie rock
- Length: 40:18
- Label: The Militia Group
- Producer: Don Peris, Denison Witmer

Denison Witmer chronology
The River Bends & Flows into the Sea (2004)	Are You a Dreamer? (2005)

Professional ratings
Review scores
Source	Rating
Allmusic	4/5 stars

Are You a Dreamer? is a studio album by American singer-songwriter Denison Witmer. It was released on The Militia Group on July 26, 2005.

== Track listing ==
(All songs written by Denison Witmer)

1. "Little Flowers" – 4:32
2. "Everything But Sleep" – 3:12
3. "Ringing of the Bell Tower" – 4:54
4. "Are You a Dreamer?" – 4:15
5. "East from West" – 3:22
6. "California Brown and Blue" – 5:04
7. "Castle and Cathedral" – 3:26
8. "Worry All the Time" – 4:03
9. "Grandma Mary" – 3:00
10. "Finding Your Feet Again" – 4:30

== Personnel ==
- Denison Witmer – vocals, guitar, classical guitar, additional producer, engineer, artwork
- Don Peris – electric guitar, organ, classical guitar, 12-string acoustic guitar, vocal, producer, engineer, mixing
- James McAlister – drums, percussion
- Mike Bitts – bass guitar
- Sufjan Stevens – banjo ("Little Flowers"), recorder ensemble ("Everything But Sleep"), Wurlitzer ("East From West"), organ ("California Brown and Blue"), vocal ("Everything But Sleep", "Finding Your Feet Again")
- Kaleen Enke – vocal, artwork
- Karen Peris – vocal
- Katrina Kerns – vocal
- Shara Worden – vocal
- Mike Musser – additional engineer
- Ken Heitmueller – mastering
- Randall P. Jenkins – layout, photography, technical assistance
