= Umbrella (The Innocence Mission album) =

Studio album by the Innocence Mission
- Released: 1991
- Recorded: February – April 1991
- Studio: The Kiva, Dreamland, Masterdisc
- Genre: Pop
- Length: 44:25
- Label: A&M
- Producer: Larry Klein, the Innocence Mission

The Innocence Mission chronology
The Innocence Mission (1989)	Umbrella (1991)	Glow (1995)

Umbrella is the second album by the American band the Innocence Mission, released in 1991. The band supported the album with a North American tour.

== Production ==
The album was produced by Larry Klein and the band. It was recorded in two months in several studios in Los Angeles, Kingston, New York, and New York City, including the Kiva, Dreamland Recording, and Masterdisc. The lyrics were written by lead singer Karen Peris; she was particularly inspired by the light coming through the stained glass windows at Dreamland. Peris also played keyboards. The band thought that Umbrella's songs were more personal than those on the first album.

== Critical reception ==
Professional ratings
Review scores
Source	Rating
AllMusic	3/5 stars
Boston Herald	B+
Calgary Herald	C−
The Republican	3.5/5 stars

The Calgary Herald wrote that "Mission's singer/songwriter Karen Peris clones Natalie Merchant's seductive and indolent vocals, copying the Maniacs' sound except on later tracks where she puppets Kate Bush." The Indianapolis Star stated that, "besides Peris' wafting synthesizer and eventually wearying vocals, her three bandmates' guitars and drums float directionless." The Republican considered "And Hiding Away" to be one of the "most captivating songs of the year."

Newsday opined that "it's nice to know there's a place ... for Innocence Mission's kind of careful intelligence, but the pretentious lyrics and art-rock arrangements made them come across as a little humorless and more than a little dull." The Washington Post deemed the album "pretty, sweet and bland." The State called it "light and breezy guitar-driven pop."

== Track listing ==
No.	Title	Length
1.	"And Hiding Away" (words by Karen Peris, music by Donald and Karen Peris)	3:34
2.	"Sorry and Glad Together"	3:26
3.	"Umbrella"	2:40
4.	"Every Hour Here"	3:27
5.	"Evensong" (words by Karen Peris, music by Donald and Karen Peris)	3:41
6.	"Now in This Hush"	4:24
7.	"Beginning the World" (words by Karen Peris, music by Karen and Donald Peris)	4:50
8.	"Flags" (words by Karen Peris, music by Donald and Karen Peris)	3:00
9.	"Someday Coming" (words by Karen Peris, music by Donald and Karen Peris)	4:03
10.	"Joan" (Karen Peris, music by Karen and Donald Peris)	3:22
11.	"Revolving Man" (words by Karen Peris, music by Donald and Karen Peris)	4:33
12.	"My Waltzing Days Are Over/Minta's Waltz"	3:25
Total length:		44:26
