= Christ Is My Hope =

EP by The Innocence Mission
- Released: April 12, 2000
- Recorded: 2000
- Genre: Alternative, folk
- Length: 22:29
- Label: LAMP
- Producer: The Innocence Mission

The Innocence Mission chronology
Birds of My Neighborhood (1999)	Christ Is My Hope (2000)	Small Planes (2001)

Professional ratings
Review scores
Source	Rating
AllMusic	3/5 stars

Christ Is My Hope is the third EP by the American alternative rock band the Innocence Mission.

A collection of newly recorded spiritual music ("O Lord of Light", "O Sacred Head Surrounded", "Beautiful Saviour"), folk songs ("500 Miles"), ballads ("Fare Thee Well"), and original songs ("No Storms Come", "Christ Is My Hope", "Morning Star"), the record was released independently by the group's own label, LAMP, with all proceeds donated to hunger relief charities.

The lyrics to "No Storms Come" are adapted from the poem "Heaven-Haven (A Nun Takes the Veil)" by 19th-century English poet Gerard Manley Hopkins. It was re-released on their album Befriended (2003).

== Track listing ==
No.	Title	Length
1.	"It Is Well with My Soul" (H.G. Spafford, P.P. Bliss)	1:17
2.	"O Lord of Light" (Traditional / Text Arr. by Melvin Farrell)	1:43
3.	"500 Miles" (Traditional)	2:51
4.	"No Storms Come" (Karen Peris, Gerard Manley Hopkins)	1:33
5.	"Christ Is My Hope" (Karen Peris)	2:34
6.	"Morning Star" (Don Peris)	1:23
7.	"O Sacred Head Surrounded" (Words: Henry Baker & Melvin Farrell / Music: Hassler & Bach)	2:41
8.	"Were You There?" (Spiritual)	3:09
9.	"Fare Thee Well" (David Gude)	2:23
10.	"Beautiful Saviour" (Words by J.A. Seiss)	3:01
