= The Innocence Mission =

American musical group

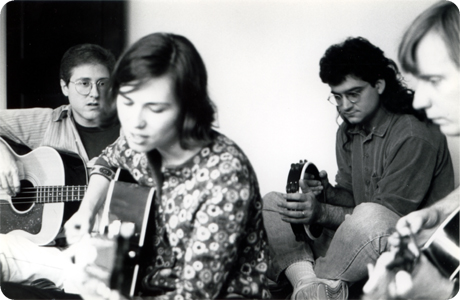

Background information
- Origin: Lancaster, Pennsylvania, United States
- Genres: Alternative rock, indie pop, indie folk, dream pop
- Years active: 1986–present
- Labels: Bella Union; A&M; Kneeling Elephant; RCA; What Are Records?; Badman Recording Co.; LAMP; Korda Records; Therese Records
- Members: Karen Peris; Don Peris; Mike Bitts; Steve Brown
- Website: www.theinnocencemission.com

The Innocence Mission (sometimes stylized as the innocence mission) is an American alternative rock and indie folk band that was formed in Lancaster, Pennsylvania in 1986. The group's current members are Karen Peris (née McCullough), her husband (and fellow guitarist) Don Peris, and Mike Bitts (on bass guitar). While all of these members have contributed to the composition of the band's music, Karen Peris serves as The Innocence Mission's primary songwriter. She is also a multi-instrumentalist, additionally playing instruments such as the accordion and the Hammond organ on the band's releases. As of December 2024, the group has released a total of thirteen studio albums.

== History ==
=== Beginnings ===
The band members met in 1980 during a Catholic school production of Godspell. Before being signed to a record label, the band played extensively throughout Pennsylvania (Philadelphia), Washington D.C and New York.

Their self-titled debut album was released in 1989 on A&M Records and was produced by Larry Klein, then-husband of Joni Mitchell. Recorded in Mitchell's Los Angeles studio, the album spent 10 weeks on the Billboard charts, peaking at #167 in 1990. Klein also produced their 1991 follow up, Umbrella.

Their third A&M album, Glow (1995), was produced by Dennis Herring, who had previously produced two records for Camper Van Beethoven. This album was a departure from Klein's heavier production style. Herring's production gave more emphasis to the group's guitar work and to Karen's vocals and lyrics. Glow contains songs that appear on the soundtracks of the films Empire Records and Dream for an Insomniac, as well as the television series Party of Five. The album's second track, "Bright as Yellow", peaked at #33 on Billboard's Modern Rock Tracks. After the band completed the recording of a follow-up album to Glow, A&M Records was bought by Universal Music Group. The group decided to mutually part ways with the label, shortly before it was merged with other companies to form Interscope-Geffen-A&M.

=== 1999 - present ===
The band's post-major label recordings have captured a more straightforward pop/folk sound, starting with 1999's Birds of My Neighborhood. The album was followed by the release of The Lakes of Canada EP, which contains a remix of "Snow" by Icelandic electronic group GusGus, the band's only remix thus far.

The 2000 release, Christ Is My Hope, featuring folk songs and hymns that had inspired them over the years, was independently distributed by their own label, LAMP, with all proceeds from sales of the record being donated to hunger relief charities. An exclusive one-album deal signed with independent label WhatAreRecords? saw Small Planes following a year later.

Their first album on Badman Records in the US and Agenda in Europe, Befriended, was released in 2003 and was followed a year later by a collection of lullabies, standards, traditional and classical songs called Now the Day Is Over. Recorded over two weeks in August 2004, the album contained their well-known cover of Henry Mancini's "Moon River". Badman Records acquired license to re-master and re-issue the then-out-of-print Birds of My Neighborhood album in 2006. The label re-issued Now the Day is Over in 2022 with new artwork.

We Walked in Song was released in 2007 and included the song "Brotherhood of Man", which appeared in two acclaimed films: the documentary The Human Experience and the short film Weathered, starring Tony Hale and Nicole Parker, which also featured a new version of the song "Our Harry". Also on this album are "Happy Birthday" and closing song "Over the Moon", both of which are featured in the Julia Roberts film Fireflies in the Garden.

On June 6, 2008, "Bright as Yellow" was played as the official NASA wake-up call for the crew of Space Shuttle mission STS-124 on flight day 7.

"Pioneering"
Album version, as it appeared on Street Map. This audio sample is indicative of the folk pop sound adopted by the band following the departure of drummer Steve Brown in 1997.

Street Map was released in December 2008 and was the second record to be distributed independently on their own LAMP label, while their eighth studio album, My Room in the Trees, was released on July 13, 2010. Their ninth studio album, Hello I Feel the Same, was released on October 17, 2015, followed by Sun on the Square in 2018. See You Tomorrow was released on January 17, 2020 and Geranium Lake was released on October 24. 2022. Their next studio album, Midwinter Swimmers, was released on November 29, 2024, (Therese Records / Bella Union) following the singles "This Thread Is a Green Street" (Sept. 4, 2024) and Midwinter Swimmers (October 16, 2024).

=== Solo projects ===
Karen Peris released her first solo album, Violet, on December 3, 2012. The ten-song album was performed mainly on piano, and features six instrumental compositions. Don Peris appears as guitarist on two songs, while the couple's two children performed violin and viola on a further two songs. A version of the album containing two bonus tracks, "First Days in the City" and "Getting Here", was released in Japan through P-Vine Records on May 15, 2013. Karen's second solo album, A Song Is Way Above the Lawn, was released on October 8, 2021.

Don Peris has recorded four solo albums: Ten Silver Slide Trombones (2001), the mostly instrumental Go When the Morning Shineth (2006), which features a vocal contribution from Karen Peris on "North Atlantic Sand", and an instrumental solo guitar album, Brighter Visions Beam Afar (2007), which raised money for local food banks. His fourth studio album, The Old Century, was released on May 7, 2013.

== Discography ==
- The Innocence Mission (1989)
- Umbrella (1991)
- Glow (1995)
- Birds of My Neighborhood (1999)
- Small Planes (2001)
- Befriended (2003)
- Now the Day Is Over (2004)
- We Walked in Song (2007)
- My Room in the Trees (2010)
- Hello I Feel the Same (2015)
- Sun on the Square (2018)
- See You Tomorrow (2020)
- Midwinter Swimmers (2024)

== Film and television ==
- 2018 - Irreplaceable You - song: "Tomorrow on the Runway"
- 2012 - The Perks of Being a Wallflower - song: "Evensong"
- 2011 - Fireflies in the Garden - songs: "Over the Moon" and "Happy Birthday"
- 2011 - Grey's Anatomy - song: "Rain (Setting out in the Leaf Boat)"
- 2011 - Alive and Ticking - song: "Tomorrow on the Runway"
- 2009 - Weathered - songs: "Brotherhood of Man" and "Our Harry"
- 2008 - The Human Experience - songs: "Brotherhood of Man" and "Moon River"
- 1996 - Dream for an Insomniac - song: "Keeping Awake"
- 1996 - Party of Five - song: "Everything's Different Now"
- 1995 - Empire Records - song: "Bright as Yellow"
- 1990 - Beverly Hills 90210 - song "Clear to You"

== Guest recordings ==
- 2021 - Lost Horizons, In Quiet Moments - Karen Peris
- 2017 - Lost Horizons, Ojalá - Karen Peris
- 2005 - Denison Witmer, Are You a Dreamer? - Don and Karen Peris, produced and engineered by Don
- 1998 - Natalie Merchant, Ophelia - Don and Karen Peris
- 1991 - Joni Mitchell, Night Ride Home - Karen Peris
- 1991 - Peter Himmelman, From Strength to Strength, "This Too Will Pass" - Karen Peris
- 1990 - John Hiatt, Stolen Moments - Karen Peris
