= Birds of My Neighborhood =

Studio album by the Innocence Mission
- Released: August 10, 1999
- Recorded: 1997–1999
- Genre: Alternative, folk
- Length: 37:17
- Label: Kneeling Elephant/RCA; Badman
- Producer: The Innocence Mission

The Innocence Mission chronology
Glow (1995)	Birds of My Neighborhood (1999)	Christ Is My Hope (2000)

Professional ratings
Review scores
Source	Rating
AllMusic	4/5 stars
Pitchfork	7.7/10

Birds of My Neighborhood is the fourth studio album by the Innocence Mission. Released in 1999 on Kneeling Elephant, a sub-label of RCA, the album was out of print until Badman Recording acquired the license to remaster and reissue it in 2006.

This was the group's first album as a trio following the departure of founding member Steve Brown in 1997. With the exception of his sole contribution to the album—drums and brushes on "Snow"—the album is largely bereft of drums. Don Peris played percussion on "Birdless" and the closing moments of "Green Grass, Red Tree," but otherwise the group adapted to its trio status by replacing Mike Bitt's electric bass with an upright bass and taking a more acoustic sound.

Their cover of "Follow Me" was recorded in late 1997 for Take Me Home, a John Denver tribute album which had an estimated release date of 1998. With the delay of that album's release, however, Don Peris asked that record's curator, Mark Kozelek of the Red House Painters, for permission to include the song on Birds of My Neighborhood. Kozelek agreed on the condition that the song still be included on the tribute album when a general release was finally given in April 2000.

Sufjan Stevens recorded a cover version of "The Lakes of Canada" in 2007.

On February 5, 2021, a vinyl reissue was released, which came with an updated album cover.

== Track listing ==
All tracks written by Karen Peris, except where noted.

No.	Title	Length
1.	"Where Does the Time Go?"	3:32
2.	"Snow"	3:47
3.	"Follow Me" (John Denver)	3:19
4.	"The Lakes of Canada"	4:35
5.	"You Are the Light"	2:56
6.	"Birdless"	3:34
7.	"I Haven't Seen This Day Before"	2:09
8.	"She May Turn Around"	2:17
9.	"I Was in the Air" (Don Peris)	2:38
10.	"July"	3:22
11.	"Going Away" (Karen Peris, Don Peris)	3:06
12.	"Green Grass, Red Tree" (Don Peris)	2:20
Total length:		37:17

== Personnel ==
- Karen Peris – acoustic, electric, and nylon string guitar, piano, organ, vocals
- Don Peris – acoustic, electric, and nylon string guitar, drums, tambourine, organ, lead and backing vocals
- Mike Bitts – double bass, bass guitar, backing vocals
- Steve Brown – drums and brushes on "Snow"

Album credits

- Recorded and mixed by Don Peris
- Tracks 3, 4, 5, 7, 10 mixed by Todd Vos and Don Peris
- Greg Calbi: Mastering [original]
- Shawn Hatfield: Mastering [re-release]
