= We Walked in Song =

Studio album by The Innocence Mission
- Released: March 13, 2007
- Recorded: 2006
- Genre: Alternative rock, indie folk
- Length: 38:02 (U.S.); 48:18 (Europe)
- Label: Badman, Fargo
- Producer: The Innocence Mission

The Innocence Mission chronology
Now the Day Is Over (2004)	We Walked in Song (2007)	Street Map (2008)

We Walked in Song Vinyl Cover

Professional ratings
Review scores
Source	Rating
The Guardian	4/5 stars
Pitchfork	(7.5/10)
CD Baby	5/5 stars
Entertainment Weekly	(Favorable)
Time Out London	5/5 stars
Uncut	4/5 stars
The A.V. Club	(A−)
No Depression	(Favorable)
Paste	4/5 stars

We Walked in Song is the eighth studio album by the Innocence Mission. It was released in North America on March 13, 2007 by Badman Recording Co., with a vinyl edition containing the bonus track "Shooting Star (Sketch)" following a week later on March 20. All international versions of the album include the bonus track.

A European release containing three bonus tracks was commissioned later that year by French record label Fargo. One of these exclusive recordings, "Song from Holland," was a new song recorded after the album sessions and was sold as a one-track digital single by retailers such as iTunes and Amazon; while the other, "Do You See My Brothers Coming?," dates back to recording sessions from 2001.

== Cover art ==
The album was released with two different cover designs, both created by Karen Peris. The CD artwork features a young girl standing between two trees with vividly colored leaves. Karen stated on their website that the artwork was inspired by an image she had seen in Leo Lionni's picture book 'Alexander and the Wind-Up Mouse.' Unable to figure out how Mr. Lionni painted such transparent pieces while also retaining vivid color schemes, Karen opted to paint the circles on mylar to create a similar effect. In the same post, she also mentioned that the young girl on the CD cover was unknown to her. She cut the image out of an old French-language text book she had found at a library book sale. The name of the photographer or identity of the young girl was not stated and she "had to hope that [they] would not mind my using the lovely photo."

The vinyl edition contained expansive artwork featuring a group of people painted using the same mylar technique used to create the leaves on the CD artwork. Since the people are placed onto the surface of the cover with a removable sticky-adhesive, the individual people could be removed from the cover and placed back onto the sleeve in any order. This feature is only found on North American editions of the vinyl, since internationally printed editions of the vinyl were made with standard glue.

== Track listing ==
All songs written by Karen Peris.

No.	Title	Length
1.	"Brotherhood of Man"	3:28
2.	"Happy Birthday"	3:32
3.	"Love That Boy"	3:37
4.	"Into Brooklyn, Early in the Morning"	2:56
5.	"Lake Shore Drive"	4:45
6.	"Song for Tom"	3:15
7.	"Since I Still Tell You My Every Day"	2:42
8.	"A Wave Is Rolling"	3:22
9.	"Colors of the World"	3:26
10.	"Over the Moon"	4:16
11.	"My Sisters Return from Ireland"	2:45
Total length:		38:02

=== Bonus tracks ===
No.	Title	Length
12.	"Shooting Star (Sketch)" (Included as a bonus track on all vinyl and international editions)	2:14
13.	"Song from Holland" (Released for a limited time as a digital single)	3:20
14.	"Do You See My Brothers Coming?"	3:45
Total length:		48:10

== Release history ==
Region	Date	Label	Format	Catalog
Japan	March 8, 2007	P-Vine	CD	PCD-23875
North America	March 13, 2007	Badman Recording Co.	CD	BRCD-939
Korea	March 13, 2007	Pastel Music	CD	PMCD-303
Taiwan	March 19, 2007	Avant Garden	CD, Vinyl	AG1068
North America	March 20, 2007	Badman Recording Co.	Vinyl	BRLP-939
Europe	August 18, 2007	Fargo	CD/Deluxe Edition	FA0096

== Chart performance ==
Album – Charting positions

Year	Chart	Position	Sales
2007	U.S. Independent Albums	177	1,745

Note: The sales listed above only include physical copies bought at Nielsen SoundScan-enabled physical retailers for the weeks running March 14 until March 28, 2007. This excludes copies bought directly from The Innocence Mission's and Badman's official websites – which would be seen as the biggest sellers of Innocence Mission-related material, since many larger stores such as HMV don't stock their material.

== Personnel ==
- Karen Peris – vocals, guitar, field pump organ, piano, Hammond organ
- Don Peris – guitars, background vocals, drums, Hammond organ
- Mike Bitts – acoustic and electric bass
- Hunter Johnson – additional drums on "Lake Shore Drive"
- Engineered and Mixed by Don Peris
- Mastered by Shawn Hatfield
