= Befriended =

Studio album by the Innocence Mission
- Released: September 2, 2003
- Genre: Alternative rock
- Length: 36:11
- Label: Badman
- Producer: The Innocence Mission

The Innocence Mission chronology
Small Planes (2001)	Befriended (2003)	Now the Day Is Over (2004)

Professional ratings
Review scores
Source	Rating
AllMusic	4/5 stars
Pitchfork	7.6/10

Befriended is the sixth full-length studio album by American alternative rock band the Innocence Mission. The album was released on August 25, 2003, in the United Kingdom and Ireland by Agenda and on September 2, 2003, in the United States and Canada by Badman Recording Co.

The lyrics of the song "No Storms Come" are adapted from the poem "Heaven-Haven: A Nun Takes the Veil" by Gerard Manley Hopkins.

== Track listing ==
No.	Title	Length
1.	"Tomorrow on the Runway" (Karen Peris)	4:18
2.	"When Mac Was Swimming" (Karen Peris)	3:48
3.	"I Never Knew You from the Sun" (Karen Peris)	3:12
4.	"Beautiful Change" (Karen Peris)	2:57
5.	"Martha Avenue Love Song" (Karen and Don Peris)	3:44
6.	"One for Sorrow, Two for Joy" (Karen Peris)	4:05
7.	"No Storms Come" (Karen Peris)	1:34
8.	"Sweep Down Early" (Karen Peris)	4:21
9.	"Walking Around" (Karen Peris)	4:48
10.	"Look for Me as You Go By" (Don Peris)	3:30
Total length:		36:11

=== Bonus Tracks ===
No.	Title	Length
11.	"500 Miles" (Vinyl Bonus Track. Previously available on Christ Is My Hope.)	2:51
12.	"The Way You Know" (Japanese Bonus Track)	3:53
