= Glow (The Innocence Mission album) =

Studio album by The Innocence Mission
- Released: June 6, 1995
- Genres: Folk rock, indie pop, dream pop
- Length: 40:23
- Label: A&M
- Producer: Dennis Herring

The Innocence Mission chronology
Umbrella (1991)	Glow (1995)	Birds of My Neighborhood (1999)

Singles from Glow
- 1. "Bright as Yellow" Released: 1995

Professional ratings
Review scores
Source	Rating
AllMusic	4.5/5 stars

Glow is the third album by the American folk rock band the Innocence Mission, released in 1995 on A&M Records. Musically, it marked a radical departure for the group, as the Sundays/10,000 Maniacs-inspired dream pop aesthetic found on their first two albums was replaced by a more straightforward, cleaner rock sound. The album was recorded over a several-month period at Kingsway Studios, New Orleans, Louisiana and Bad Animals Studios, Seattle, Washington.

== Track listing ==
1. "Keeping Awake" – 3:58
2. "Bright as Yellow" – 3:32
3. "Brave" – 3:49
4. "That Was Another Country" – 4:18
5. "Speak Our Minds" – 2:54
6. "Happy, the End" – 3:38
7. "Our Harry" – 2:21
8. "Go" – 3:06
9. "Everything's Different Now" – 3:16
10. "Spinning" – 3:13
11. "There" – 3:55
12. "I Hear You Say So" – 2:11

All songs written by Karen Peris except "Keeping Awake", music by Don and Karen Peris.

=== "Bright as Yellow" ===
"Bright as Yellow", the album's only official single, peaked at number 33 on Billboard's Modern Rock Tracks chart. It was featured extensively on several episodes of the hit TV series Party of Five and can also be found on the soundtrack to the film Empire Records, among others.

On June 6, 2008, "Bright as Yellow" was played as the official NASA wake-up call for the crew of Space Shuttle mission STS-124 on flight day 7.

The track list for the single is as follows:

1. "Bright As Yellow" (album version) – 3:33
2. "Let's Talk About Something Else" – 3:15
3. "That Was Another Country" (album version) – 4:17
4. "Geranium Lake" – 1:27

All songs written by Karen Peris except "Let's Talk About Something Else" and "Geranium Lake", written by Karen Peris and Don Peris. All songs produced by Dennis Herring except two and four, recorded and engineered by Don Peris.

== Personnel ==
- Karen Peris – vocals, piano, acoustic guitar, organ
- Don Peris – guitars, organ
- Mike Bitts – bass guitar, vocals, vibes
- Steve Brown – drums, tambourine
- David Tonkonogui – cello on "That Was Another Country"
- Dennis Herring – producer
- Bob Ludwig – mastering
- Chris Fuhrman – engineer
- John Burton – assistant engineer
- Trina Shoemaker – assistant engineer
