= Your Heart Is as Black as Night =

Single by Melody Gardot

from the album My One and Only Thrill
- Released: February 22, 2011
- Recorded: 2008
- Genre: Jazz
- Length: 2:42
- Label: Verve/UCJ
- Songwriter: Melody Gardot
- Producer: Larry Klein

Melody Gardot singles chronology
"Baby I'm a Fool" (2009)	"Your Heart Is as Black as Night" (2011)	"Mira" (2012)

"Your Heart Is as Black as Night" is a song by American jazz singer and songwriter Melody Gardot, released on February 22, 2011, as the third single from her second studio album, My One and Only Thrill. The song was written by Gardot and produced by Larry Klein. Other singles released from the album are "Who Will Comfort Me" and "Baby I'm a Fool".

== Background ==
The song was recorded for Gardot's second studio album, My One and Only Thrill, which was released on March 16, 2009, by Verve Records. The album was produced by Larry Klein, known for his work with Joni Mitchell and Herbie Hancock. "Your Heart Is as Black as Night" appears as the fourth track on the album. The lyrics explore such themes as romantic betrayal and wariness.

The single was released digitally through the iTunes Store. The song later appeared on several compilations and special editions. Since then, Gardot has performed "Your Heart Is as Black as Night" in concert throughout her further career.

== Covers ==
The song has been covered by other artists, most notably by Beth Hart and Joe Bonamassa on their 2011 collaborative album Don't Explain. Other covers include versions by Chelsey Forrest and Kirk Smart (2010), Counterparts (2013), and several others.

== Personnel ==
- Melody Gardot – vocals, songwriter
- Larry Klein – producer
