= Torch song =

Sentimental love song

A torch song is a sentimental love song, typically one in which the singer laments an unrequited or lost love, either where one party is oblivious to the existence of the other, where one party has moved on, or where a romantic affair has affected the relationship. The term comes from the saying "to carry a torch for someone" or to keep aflame the light of an unrequited love. It was first used by the cabaret singer Tommy Lyman in his praise of "My Melancholy Baby".

The term is also explicitly cited in the song "Jim", popularized by versions by Dinah Shore, Billie Holiday, Sarah Vaughan and Ella Fitzgerald:

Someday, I know that Jim will up and leave me
But even if he does you can believe me
I'll go on carryin' the torch for Jim.
I'll go on lovin' my Jim.

Another explicit reference to carrying a torch is the last verse of Johnny Mercer’s lyrics to "One for My Baby (and One More for the Road)":

Well, that's how it goes and Joe
I know you're gettin' anxious to close
So, thanks for the cheer, I hope you didn't mind my bendin' your ear
But this torch that I found must be drowned or it soon might explode
So, make it one for my baby and one more for the road.

Torch-singing is a niche within a genre. It may stray from the traditional jazz-influenced style of singing; the American tradition of the torch song typically relies upon the melodic structure of the blues. Examples of a collection are Billie Holiday's 1955 album Music for Torching and Entre eux deux by Melody Gardot and Philippe Powell.

== See also ==
- Sentimental ballad
