= Live in Europe (Melody Gardot album) =

Live album by Melody Gardot
- Released: February 9, 2018
- Recorded: 2012–2016
- Venue: Various locations in Europe
- Genre: Jazz
- Length: 105:56
- Label: Decca
- Producer: Melody Gardot

Melody Gardot chronology
Currency of Man (2015)	Live in Europe (2018)	Sunset in the Blue (2020)

Professional ratings
Review scores
Source	Rating
AllMusic	4/5 stars
Jazz Forum	4/5 stars
Jazzwise	2/5 stars
Laut.de	5/5 stars
Le Devoir	3/5 stars
The Philadelphia Inquirer	3.5/5 stars
The Times	4/5 stars

Live in Europe is the first live album by American singer and songwriter Melody Gardot, released on February 9, 2018, by Decca Records.

== Background ==
The album was recorded in various venues across Europe between 2012 and 2016. It contains 17 tracks carefully selected from more than 300 concerts and is released as a double CD or triple LP. She also was the album producer. Gardot explained, "I dreamed to have a live album since many years ago. Something that would be a dedication to the people who welcomed us all over the world. At first, I had wanted to seek out the “best of” in a way that would illustrate the most perfect performances from our concerts over the last few years... This album holds my heart, and the love of all the people who supported us along the way. It is as much a gift to me, for the memories it holds, as it is my gift to you, the listener." Regarding the album cover where she is seen wearing only her guitar, she commented in her interview to Numéro, "For me an album cover is like a movie poster. I wanted an image that was pure femininity, which could please a sculptor. I went through a lot of suffering. But managing to stand up nude on stage carrying a guitar is a victory."

== Reception ==
Matt Collar of AllMusic described Live in Europe as "a gorgeously produced collection showcasing her emotive vocals in an organic, deeply atmospheric concert framework." Christopher Loudon of JazzTimes stated, "The cover shows a woman, center stage, spotlit, back to the camera, nude save a guitar. The inference is obvious: This, her first live album, is Gardot laid bare. But Gardot has ranked among the most nakedly honest and emotionally vulnerable of singers, ever since her stellar debut with Worrisome Heart in 2008. Live in Europe's two discs—17 cuts culled from more than 300 concerts between 2012 and 2016—simply confirm that she exhibits the same breathtaking naturalism in front of thousands-strong audiences." John Bungey of The Times added, "Well the nude cover shot (tasteful, from the rear) threw me a bit, but inside there's a fine record. Amid the flurry of photogenic young women signed by the majors after Diana Krall seduced the pop public into buying jazz, Melody Gardot has proved the most enduring and original." A. D. Amorosi writing for The Philadelphia Inquirer commented that the album, "is an exceptional example of how Gardot breathes when out and about." The Christian Science Monitor included the album in its top picks list, observing, "...Gardot’s elastic alto effortlessly channel the best elements of Barbra Streisand, Edith Piaf, and Nina Simone, and you’ll wonder why she isn’t a household name."

== Track listing ==
All tracks are written by Melody Gardot except tracks 1, 3, 12 written by Melody Gardot and Jesse Harris, and track 8 written by Harold Arlen and Yip Harburg.

No.	Title	Length
1.	"Our Love Is Easy"	6:21
2.	"Baby I'm a Fool"	4:20
3.	"The Rain"	11:19
4.	"Deep Within the Corners of My Mind"	6:54
5.	"So Long"	5:30
6.	"My One and Only Thrill"	7:30
7.	"Lisboa"	7:04
8.	"Over the Rainbow"	5:07
9.	"(Monologue) Special Spot"	2:11
10.	"Baby I'm a Fool"	4:02
11.	"Les Etoiles"	3:19
12.	"Goodbye"	4:05
13.	"(Monologue) Tchao Baby"	0:22
14.	"March for Mingus"	11:14
15.	"Bad News"	6:26
16.	"Who Will Comfort Me"	7:18
17.	"Morning Sun"	12:23
Total length:		105:56

== Personnel ==
- Melody Gardot – vocals, guitar, piano
- Chuck Staab III – electric piano, drums
- Devin Greenwood – organ, percussion, backing vocals
- Mitchell Long – guitar, backing vocals
- Aidan Caroll – double bass
- Edwin Livingston – double bass
- Sam Minaie – double bass
- Stephan Braun – cello
- James Casey – saxophone
- Irwin Hall – alto saxophone, tenor saxophone, flute
- Korey Riker – baritone saxophone
- Shareef Clayton – trumpet
- Bryan Brock – percussion

== Charts ==
=== Weekly charts ===
Weekly chart performance for Live in Europe
Chart (2018)	Peak position
Australian Jazz & Blues Albums (ARIA)	4
Austrian Albums (Ö3 Austria)	14
Belgian Albums (Ultratop Flanders)	33
Belgian Albums (Ultratop Wallonia)	12
Dutch Albums (Album Top 100)	152
French Albums (SNEP)	16
German Albums (Offizielle Top 100)	14
Japanese Albums (Oricon)	162
Portuguese Albums (AFP)	32
Spanish Albums (Promusicae)	82
Swedish Jazz Albums (Sverigetopplistan)	8
Swiss Albums (Schweizer Hitparade)	10
UK Jazz & Blues Albums (Official Charts)	3
US Top Current Album Sales (Billboard)	57
US Top Jazz Albums (Billboard)	2
US Traditional Jazz Albums (Billboard)	2

=== Year-end charts ===
Year-end chart performance for Live in Europe
Chart (2018)	Position
Belgian Albums (Ultratop Wallonia)	166
French Albums (SNEP)	160
