= Baby I'm a Fool =

Single by Melody Gardot

from the album My One and Only Thrill
- Released: April 7, 2009
- Recorded: 2008
- Genre: Jazz
- Length: 3:34
- Label: Verve/UCJ
- Songwriter: Melody Gardot
- Producer: Larry Klein

Melody Gardot singles chronology
"Who Will Comfort Me" (2009)	"Baby I'm a Fool" (2009)	"Your Heart Is as Black as Night" (2011)

"Baby I'm a Fool" is a song written and composed by American jazz singer-songwriter Melody Gardot. It was released as the second single from her second full-length album, My One and Only Thrill. According to Gardot, the lyrics are about "two coquette people who won't admit they are in love with each other." A live rendition of the song was also recorded and released on her Live from SoHo EP. It also appeared in her 2018 live album Live in Europe.

== Music video ==
A music video for "Baby I'm a Fool" was directed by Aaron Platt produced by Justin Cronkite, and filmed entirely in black-and-white. The video displays Gardot resting in an Clawfoot bathtub flanked by dancers dressed in tuxedos who perform an elaborate choreographic sequence to the rhythm of the song.

== Charts ==
Chart (2009–2010)	Peak position
Belgium (Ultratip Bubbling Under Wallonia)	23
Japan (Japan Hot 100)	8
Norway (VG-lista)	10
Sweden (Sverigetopplistan)	5
US Smooth Jazz Airplay (Billboard)	28
