= Sunset in the Blue =

Studio album by Melody Gardot
- Released: October 23, 2020
- Studios: Abbey Road, London; AIR Lyndhurst, London; Capitol, Los Angeles; Cherrytree, US; Henson, Los Angeles; II Palagio, Italy; Les Studios Saint Germain, Paris; Metropolis, London
- Genre: Jazz
- Length: 56:27
- Label: Decca
- Producer: Larry Klein

Melody Gardot chronology
| Live in Europe (2018) | Sunset in the Blue (2020) | Entre eux deux (2022) |

Professional ratings
Review scores
| Source | Rating |
|---|---|
| All About Jazz | 3.5/5 stars |
| AllMusic | 4.5/5 stars |
| The Arts Desk | 4/5 stars |
| DownBeat | 4/5 stars |
| Jazz Journal | 5/5 stars |
| Laut.de | 5/5 stars |
| Mojo | 4/5 stars |
| MusicOMH | 2.5/5 stars |
| The Philadelphia Inquirer | 3.5/5 stars |
| The Yorkshire Times | 3/5 stars |

Sunset in the Blue is the fifth studio album by American singer and songwriter Melody Gardot. It was recorded both in the US and in Europe. It was produced by Larry Klein and released on October 23, 2020, by Decca Records.

== Background ==
The album is a collection of originals and standards; the bonus track "Little Something" features Sting. The tracks are her performances recorded with the Royal Philharmonic Orchestra. For one song, "From Paris with Love", she invited unemployed musicians from around the world (United States, Armenia, South Korea, Japan, Australia, Brazil, Norway, and others) to record their parts in their homes and then to send their recordings to her electronically. Gardot insisted that the musicians were paid fees related to a standard UK musicians studio wage in order to compensate for their time and expertise. Said Gardot, "It is so important that we come together in this moment where there is a deafening silence happening in the arts...we are part of one large family (artists, musicians, singers, painters...) and this album is a testament to that collaborative spirit; a smorgasbord of talent all in one place, and living proof, that even now, we can use the numerous resources we have to break traditional ways of thinking about recordings, if just for the simple sake of continuing to move forward and create great music..." Of his duet with Gardot, Sting commented, "This new song... has a simple and infectious joy, and it was so much fun to trade vocals with the exquisite Melody Gardot I hope you can hear the smile in our voices."

A bonus edition of the album was released in France and Japan featuring two additional songs. An orchestral arrangement of "La Chanson Des Vieux Amants", which is different than the version that Gardot contributed to the Brel: Ces Gens-La tribute album, and the collaboration "Little Something" (with Sting) that also appears on Sting's 2021 Duets album.

A studio version of "Wayfaring Stranger" was recorded at Studios La Fabrique and video of this recording session with sound engineer Al Schmitt was provided to Mix With The Masters as part of their programming and is currently still available to view with a membership. The audio tracks from that recording session are still unreleased with only that song on Mix With The Masters, despite references during the video to tracking other songs that day. Studio La Fabrique does not appear in the liner notes for any of the released songs including the Deluxe Edition.

A deluxe edition of the album was released April 16, 2021 and will feature five additional bonus tracks. The following was cited to fans via email from Melody Gardot's mailing list: Following the success of her highly anticipated 5th studio album Sunset In The Blue, we are delighted to announce a new Deluxe Edition featuring 5 new bonus tracks, out on April 16. The record includes an intimate recording of 'C'est Magnifique' featuring António Zambujo performed live from Namouche Studios.

"It's as if we've thrown some turpentine on the canvas to reveal the painting under the work... there's beauty in the danger of it all... it's vulnerable and fragile... unapologetic and unpolished. I even went so far as to ask the engineers to give me the prints as they were printed off the board for the masters... straight from the cutting room floor to you." - Melody Gardot

== Reception ==
Liz Thomson of The Arts Desk stated, "What a pick-me-up this album is. Released as the days darken, literally and metaphorically, it's a real joy – a transport of delight to dappled squares in Paris or Lisbon, or a street party in Rio. Sunset in the Blue is billed as "an orchestral celebration of Melody Gardot's jazz roots" but the abiding sound that remains in the mind's ear after the album's finished is that of a jazz guitar, played with a bossa nova rhythm." AllMusic review by Matt Collar commented, "With 2020's Sunset in the Blue singer Melody Gardot sinks into a dusky and languorously produced album that builds upon her love of jazz standards, Brazilian music, and intimate balladry. The record finds Gardot surrounded by a production dream team, including longtime associate Larry Klein... From beginning to end, Gardot's Sunset in the Blue holds you in its deeply rapturous glow."

John Murphy of musicOMH added, "Technically, it's an impressive achievement. Listening to it, you'd swear that the Royal Philharmonic Orchestra were in the same studio as Gardot, rather than virtually accompanying her. While there's nothing particularly challenging about Sunset In The Blue, there's no denying that Gardot has become something of an expert in this kind of thing: originals, covers and old standards all performed in the best possible taste." Atwood Magazine observed, "Oscillating between languages, based on their natural cadence and feel on her tongue, Gardot helps us to experience the varied rhythms and flows of each dialect as if they were each a separate musical instrument, capable of expressing different emotions with each sound... As an album, Sunset In The Blue is nuanced with many of the same stratum that make up Gardot herself. An equal balance of vivid culture, romantic verse and vintage class, it's almost a microcosm of the artist herself."

== Track listing ==
| No. | Title | Writer(s) | Length |
|---|---|---|---|
| 1. | "If You Love Me" | Dadi Carvalho; Melody Gardot | 4:35 |
| 2. | "C'est Magnifique" (featuring António Zambujo) | Carvalho; Melody Gardot; Pierre Aderne | 4:53 |
| 3. | "There Where He Lives in Me" | Gardot; Philippe Baden Powell; Aderne | 5:49 |
| 4. | "Love Song" | Lesley Duncan | 3:58 |
| 5. | "You Won't Forget Me" | Fred Spielman; Kermit Goell | 6:05 |
| 6. | "Sunset in the Blue" | Jesse Harris; Gardot | 4:33 |
| 7. | "Um Beijo" | Gardot | 4:06 |
| 8. | "Ninguém, Ninguém" | Gardot | 3:38 |
| 9. | "From Paris with Love" | Gardot; Aderne | 4:47 |
| 10. | "Ave Maria" | Gardot; Reese Richardson | 4:28 |
| 11. | "Moon River" | Henry Mancini; Johnny Mercer | 3:48 |
| 12. | "I Fall in Love Too Easily" | Jule Styne; Sammy Cahn | 3:10 |
| 13. | "Little Something" (with Sting. Bonus Track) | Antoine Chatenet; Conor Blake; Dominic Miller; Hilda Stenmalm; Gardot; Nora Abakar; Sting | 2:41 |
| Total length: | | | 56:27 |

French/Japan Edition
| No. | Title | Writer(s) | Length |
|---|---|---|---|
| 13. | "La Chanson Des Vieux Amants" (Bonus Track) | Gérard Jouannest; Jacques Brel | 6:59 |
| 14. | "Little Something" (with Sting. Bonus Track) | Antoine Chatenet; Conor Blake; Dominic Miller; Hilda Stenmalm; Gardot; Nora Abakar; Sting | 2:41 |
| Total length: | | | 63:26 |

Deluxe Version (April 16, 2021 Release)
| No. | Title | Writer(s) | Length |
|---|---|---|---|
| 14. | "From Paris With Love" (Bonus Track, acoustic) | Gardot; Aderne | 4:21 |
| 15. | "Love Song" (Bonus Track; featuring Ibrahim Maalouf) | Lesley Duncan | 5:25 |
| 16. | "Trav'lin Light" (Bonus Track) | Trummy Young; Jimmy Mundy; Johnny Mercer | 4:06 |
| 17. | "What Is This Thing Called Love?" (Bonus Track) | Cole Porter | 3:27 |
| 18. | "C'est Magnifique" (Bonus Track, live in Namouce Studios featuring António Zambujo) | Carvalho; Melody Gardot; Pierre Aderne | 4:54 |
| Total length: | | | 78:40 |

== Charts ==
=== Weekly charts ===
| Chart (2020) | Peak position |
|---|---|
| Austrian Albums (Ö3 Austria) | 13 |
| Belgian Albums (Ultratop Flanders) | 43 |
| Belgian Albums (Ultratop Wallonia) | 22 |
| Canadian Albums (Billboard) | 69 |
| French Albums (SNEP) | 18 |
| German Albums (Offizielle Top 100) | 27 |
| Japanese Albums (Oricon) | 88 |
| Polish Albums (ZPAV) | 38 |
| Portuguese Albums (AFP) | 10 |
| Scottish Albums (Official Charts) | 15 |
| Swedish Jazz Albums (Sverigetopplistan) | 3 |
| Swiss Albums (Schweizer Hitparade) | 10 |
| UK Albums (Official Charts) | 40 |
| US Current Album Sales (Billboard) | 70 |
| US Top Jazz Albums (Billboard) | 11 |
| US Traditional Jazz Albums (Billboard) | 9 |

=== Year-end charts ===
| Chart (2020) | Position |
|---|---|
| French Albums (SNEP) | 103 |
| Chart (2021) | Position |
| French Albums (SNEP) | 121 |

== Certifications ==
| Region | Certification | Certified units/sales |
|---|---|---|
| France (SNEP) | Gold | 50,000^{‡} |
| Germany (BVMI) | Platinum | 20,000^{‡} |
^{‡} Sales+streaming figures based on certification alone.
