= Samba em Prelúdio =

Song by Baden Powell and Vinicius de Moraes

from the album Canto on Guitar
- Language: Portuguese
- Genre: Bossa nova
- Songwriter(s): Baden Powell, Vinicius de Moraes

"Samba em Prelúdio" is a song composed in 1962 by the Brazilian guitarist Baden Powell and the composer Vinicius de Moraes and recorded by many other artists.

== Notable recordings ==
- Esperanza Spalding released a version of the song on her 2008 album Esperanza, which was made a part of the Edexcel GCSE music syllabus in the UK.
- Melody Gardot and Philippe Powell included the song in their 2022 album Entre eux deux.
