= The Absence (Melody Gardot album) =

Studio album by Melody Gardot
- Released: May 29, 2012
- Genre: Jazz; blues; bossa nova; cumbia
- Length: 57:51
- Label: Decca
- Producer: Heitor Pereira

Melody Gardot chronology
My One and Only Thrill (2009)	The Absence (2012)	Currency of Man (2015)

Singles from The Absence
- 1. "Mira" Released: April 5, 2012; 2. "Amalia" Released: April 6, 2012

Professional ratings
Aggregate scores
Source	Rating
AnyDecentMusic?	6.7/10
Metacritic	77/100
Review scores
Source	Rating
The Absolute Sound	4/5 stars
AllMusic	4/5 stars
The Irish Times	3/5 stars
Jazz Forum	4/5 stars
laut.de	4/5 stars
The New Zealand Herald	4/5 stars
Mojo	4/5 stars
musicOMH	3/5 stars
The Telegraph	4/5 stars
Uncut	3.5/5 stars

The Absence is the third studio album by American singer and songwriter Melody Gardot. It was released on May 29, 2012, by Decca Records and produced by Heitor Pereira. The same year, Gardot participated in an advertisement campaign for Piaget for which she recorded the song "La Vie en rose". This song appeared on a re-release of The Absence which also included a music video and the making of the same track.

== Critical reception ==
Ceiri O'Douglas of musicOMH mentioned, "It’s important for some artists to be as diverse as possible. Melody Gardot‘s music primarily takes influence from jazz and blues, but she’s always taken in other styles of music. On her third album, The Absence, it’s a case of more of the same. She’s travelled a lot in support of her music (mostly thanks to her 2009 breakthrough, My One And Only Thrill), and it makes sense that other cultures should have inspired the creation of its follow-up." Cormak Larkin of The Irish Times stated, "The persistent absence of clothing in her publicity photographs may suggest a flagging career but, in fact, New Jersey-born singer Melody Gardot doesn’t need to abandon her dignity to get our attention. The songs, which she writes herself, are refreshingly authentic – bittersweet laments for discarded lovers and misplaced innocence – and she sings them in a honeyed, breathy voice that has real musicality and an emotional directness that recalls Edith Piaf."

Matt Collar writing for AllMusic added, "If Melody Gardot's 2009 sophomore effort, My One and Only Thrill, sustained the sultry, atmospheric vibe of her critically acclaimed 2006 debut, her 2012 follow-up, The Absence, is a bit of a creative departure for the vocalist. Apparently inspired by her world travels, and specifically by a trip that brought her to the desert around the city of Marrakech, the album moves her away from smoky, small-group jazz and into a bright, if still bedroom-eyed, rhythmically exotic sound." Tony Nielsen of The New Zealand Herald added, "The music is mostly soft and beguiling, less in-your-face than her last album. The feel and overall direction of The Absence is easy to listen to without being bland."

== Commercial reception ==
A four-song EP, The Absence EP, was first released as an iTunes exclusive on May 15, 2012, serving as a preview for the album. The EP debuted on the Top Jazz Albums at number eight.

The album itself was released two weeks later on May 29, 2012. It debuted at number one on Billboard's Top Jazz Albums, and at number 33 on Billboard 200, selling 10,000 copies in its first week. The album had sold 51,000 copies in the US as of May 2015. The album was certified platinum in France on November 14, 2012, signifying 100,000 copies sold.

== Track listing ==
All tracks are written by Melody Gardot, except where noted.

No.	Title	Writer(s)	Length
1.	"Mira"		4:16
2.	"Amalia"	Gardot, Heitor Pereira, Phil Roy	3:03
3.	"So Long"		3:50
4.	"So We Meet Again My Heartache"		4:32
5.	"Lisboa"		5:27
6.	"Impossible Love"		3:49
7.	"If I Tell You I Love You"		3:33
8.	"Goodbye"	Gardot, Jesse Harris	3:38
9.	"Se Você Me Ama"	Gardot, Heitor Pereira	4:56
10.	"My Heart Won't Have It Any Other Way"		2:34
11.	"Iemanja" (contains hidden track "Chegue Journeyman")		18:13
Total length:			57:51

iTunes Store bonus tracks
No.	Title	Writer(s)	Length
11.	"Iemanja"		4:03
12.	"La Vie en rose"	lyrics: Edith Piaf; music: Louiguy	5:17
13.	"Mira" (Hamilton & Yamandu acoustic version)		5:09
14.	"Iemanja" (Hamilton & Yamundu acoustic version)		2:23
15.	"The Absence – Track by Track Commentary"		24:57
Total length:			81:24

Japanese edition bonus tracks
No.	Title	Length
11.	"Iemanja"	4:03
12.	"The Willow"	7:00
Total length:		50:20

Repack version bonus tracks
No.	Title	Writer(s)	Length
11.	"Iemanja"		4:03
12.	"La Vie en rose"	lyrics: Piaf; music: Louiguy	5:19
13.	"La Vie en rose" (music video; Enhanced CD)		3:07
14.	"La Vie en rose" (making of; Enhanced CD)		4:45
Total length:			48:49

Deluxe edition bonus DVD
No.	Title	Length
1.	"Mira" (Hamilton & Yamandu acoustic version)	5:09
2.	"Iemanja" (Hamilton & Yamundu acoustic version)	2:23
3.	"La Vie en rose"	5:17
4.	"La Vie en rose" (making of)	4:00
5.	"The Absence by Melody Gardot" (EPK film)	21:00

== Charts ==
=== Weekly charts ===
Chart (2012)	Peak position
Australian Albums (ARIA)	43
Australian Jazz & Blues Albums (ARIA)	1
Austrian Albums (Ö3 Austria)	10
Belgian Albums (Ultratop Flanders)	8
Belgian Albums (Ultratop Wallonia)	3
Canadian Albums (Billboard)	17
Croatian Albums (HDU)	34
Danish Albums (Hitlisten)	14
Dutch Albums (Album Top 100)	16
Finnish Albums (Suomen virallinen lista)	18
French Albums (SNEP)	3
German Albums (Offizielle Top 100)	9
Greek Albums (IFPI)	6
Irish Albums (IRMA)	22
Italian Albums (FIMI)	42
Japanese Albums (Oricon)	22
New Zealand Albums (RMNZ)	38
Norwegian Albums (VG-lista)	1
Polish Albums (ZPAV)	13
Portuguese Albums (AFP)	14
Scottish Albums (OCC)	23
Spanish Albums (PROMUSICAE)	17
Swedish Albums (Sverigetopplistan)	3
Swedish Jazz Albums (Sverigetopplistan)	1
Swiss Albums (Schweizer Hitparade)	10
UK Albums (OCC)	18
UK Jazz & Blues Albums (OCC)	1
US Billboard 200	33
US Top Jazz Albums (Billboard)	1

=== Year-end charts ===
Chart (2012)	Position
Australian Jazz & Blues Albums (ARIA)	8
Belgian Albums (Ultratop Flanders)	87
Belgian Albums (Ultratop Wallonia)	53
French Albums (SNEP)	44
Swedish Albums (Sverigetopplistan)	55
US Top Jazz Albums (Billboard)	13

== Certifications ==
Region	Certification	Certified units/sales
France (SNEP)	Platinum	100,000^{*}
Poland (ZPAV)	Gold	10,000^{*}
^{*} Sales figures based on certification alone.
