= Entre eux deux =

Studio album by Melody Gardot and Philippe Powell
- Released: May 20, 2022
- Recorded: December 2021
- Studio: Studio Guillaume Tell, Paris
- Genre: Jazz Minimalism
- Length: 43:23
- Label: Decca
- Producer: Denis Caribaux, Melody Gardot

Melody Gardot chronology
Sunset in the Blue (2020)	Entre eux deux (2022)

Professional ratings
Review scores
Source	Rating
AllMusic	3.5/5 stars
The Daily Telegraph	4/5 stars
Jazzwise	3/5 stars

Entre eux deux is the sixth studio album and the first collaborative album by American singer and songwriter Melody Gardot and Brazilian pianist Philippe Powell. Decca released the album on May 20, 2022.

== Background ==
The album was recorded in Paris and offers ten jazz torch songs mostly written by bandmembers. In contrast to Gardot's previous albums, this record is a more minimalist collection—she has recorded it only with a pianist for accompaniment rather than with a full band, probably for the first time in her career. The track "Samba em Prelúdio" is co-written by Baden Powell, who is Philippe Powell's father. The official statement mentions: "This record is a dance between two people who love and value the same things: deep poetry and solid melodies. The title Entre eux deux (between them two), stands true. Here's a peek into the world of two artists who just really dig each other. We hope you really dig it too."

Gardot and Powell have also created a short video with music to accompany the release. The film is set in and around Paris and at the famous Café de Flore.

== Reception ==
Ivan Hewett of The Daily Telegraph wrote: "And now comes her latest album Entre Eux Deux (“between those two”), beginning with "My Foolish Heart" – a song that sounds almost too close to her first big hit. It seems the heart is an organ that just will not learn, and these songs dwell on the various ways it can always be flattered and fooled and made sorrowful... The eternally soft nostalgic sweetness could become enervating, but what saves the album is Gardot's extraordinary voice, which injects an emotional truth even into those songs which aren't so remarkable in themselves." Javon Anderson of JAZZ.FM91 described the record as "a meticulously crafted, minimalistic album showcasing Gardot’s vocal ability and Powell’s emotive piano style, coming together like a deep conversation between two longtime friends." Jon Clay of Jazzwise commented: "The pair obviously like and admire each other, because there’s a palpable chemistry and connection between the two, which suits the album’s intimate intent supremely well. Gardot sings beautifully in both English and French, her enunciation of the latter tongue pin-perfect, while Powell’s dreamy, Evans-like piano runs – his use of space is exquisitely judged – provide the ideal romantic backdrop to their tête-à-tête. Purists may be unconvinced of course, but let ‘em sneer – this is good stuff, the best album Gardot has yet made. Give it a try, you might like it; and if you’re a fan of brooding torch songs, you’ll probably love it." Thom Jurek of AllMusic added: "The duo's simple presentation allows their melodies and lyrics the full impact of their poetic weight, without artifice."

== Track listing ==
Entre eux deux track listing
No.	Title	Writer(s)	Length
1.	"This Foolish Heart Could Love You"	Melody Gardot, Philippe Powell	3:22
2.	"What of Your Eyes"	Gardot	4:31
3.	"Plus Forte Que Nous"	Pierre Barouh, Francis Lai	4:49
4.	"À La Tour Eiffel"	Gardot, Powell, Jacques Bungert	3:53
5.	"Fleurs De Dimanche"	Gardot, Powell, Bungert	4:43
6.	"Samba em Prelúdio"	Pierre Barouh, Vinicius de Moraes, Baden Powell	4:36
7.	"Perhaps You'll Wonder Why"	Gardot, Powell	4:45
8.	"Recatativo (Instrumental)"	Powell	2:10
9.	"Ode to Every Man"	Gardot	5:53
10.	"Darling Fare Thee Well"	Gardot	4:45
Total length:			43:23

== Personnel ==
Musicians

- Melody Gardot – composer, photographer, producer, voices
- Philippe Powell – composer, piano, voices

Production

- Sebastian Baret – copyist
- Pierre Charles Biguet – assistant
- Denis Caribaux – engineer, mixing, producing
- Simon Gibson – mastering
- Bastien Herbin – piano technician
- Kyle Kubicek – project manager
- Florence Larbey – design

== Charts ==
Chart performance for Entre eux deux
Chart (2022)	Peak position
Austrian Albums (Ö3 Austria)	66
Belgian Albums (Ultratop Flanders)	157
Belgian Albums (Ultratop Wallonia)	32
Dutch Albums (Album Top 100)	17
French Albums (SNEP)	17
German Albums (Offizielle Top 100)	22
Portuguese Albums (AFP)	42
Swiss Albums (Schweizer Hitparade)	12
