= Currency of Man =

Studio album by Melody Gardot
- Released: June 1, 2015
- Studio: EastWest, Los Angeles; Paramount, Los Angeles; The Village, Los Angeles; Plus XXX, Paris
- Genre: Jazz; blues
- Length: 48:52
- Label: Decca
- Producer: Larry Klein

Melody Gardot chronology
The Absence (2012)	Currency of Man (2015)	Live in Europe (2018)

Professional ratings
Aggregate scores
Source	Rating
AnyDecentMusic?	7.1/10
Metacritic	78/100
Review scores
Source	Rating
The Absolute Sound	4/5 stars
AllMusic	3.5/5 stars
American Songwriter	4/5 stars
The Arts Desk	3/5 stars
The Guardian	3/5 stars
Louder Than War	8/10
Louder Sound	3.5/5 stars
Mojo	4/5 stars
The Sydney Morning Herald	3.5/5 stars
Q	4/5 stars

Currency of Man is the fourth studio album by American singer and songwriter Melody Gardot. It was released on June 1, 2015, by Decca Records and produced by Larry Klein. In 2016, the album was nominated for a Grammy Award for Best Engineered Album, Non-Classical.

== Reception ==
At Metacritic, which assigns a normalized rating out of 100 to reviews from professional publications, the release received an average score of 78, based on six critical reviews, indicating "Generally favourable reviews". Aggregator AnyDecentMusic? gave the album a 7.1 out of 10, based on their assessment of the critical consensus.

Cristopher Loudon of JazzTimes stated, "...Gardot’s distinctively airy voice has undergone significant transformation, and is now muscular and freshly imbued with a deeply resonant soulfulness. Klein responds with meaty, potent arrangements-electrified, with plenty of horns and even a gospel choir-that both complement and elevate this new sound. And though Gardot has, since her late-aughts breakthrough, proven a formidable songwriter, Currency of Man‘s 10 compositions evince heightened power and authority, elevating her to the plateau of Leonard Cohen and Klein’s ex, Joni Mitchell, with shades of Marvin Gaye and Bob Dylan." David McGee of The Absolute Sound noted, "Currency of Man employs still more sound collages while deploying horns and strings in spare, small jazz combo atmospheres to frame Gardot’s seductive vocals that speak of societal ills in evocative, poetic terms." Thom Jurek of AllMusic stated, "Vocally, Gardot is stronger than ever here, her instrument is bigger and fuller yet it retains that spectral smokiness that is her trademark. Currency of Man is a further step away from the lithe, winsome pop-jazz that garnered her notice initially, and it's a welcome one."

Mattew Wright of The Arts Desk commented, "There’s something for everyone, at least. You could play the album at a family event and everyone would like at least one song. Gardot seems to have the voice to say something worthwhile, but in order to make it work, she needs to put away the toys and sing from the heart." The Guardian review by Kate Hutchinson added, "On her last album she explored world music; on Currency of Man, she’s gone "conscious". It’s not quite Erykah Badu, but when you’re a Grammy-winning easy-listening artist, it’s an admirable direction." Hal Horowitz of American Songwriter noted, "Don’t let the jazz reference deter you from this tour de force of original tunes, all penned by Gardot. It’s a perfect combination of restrained vocal phrasing with madly creative production and a certain candidate for one of the finest albums of the year."

== Track listing ==
All tracks are written by Melody Gardot, except where noted.

No.	Title	Writer(s)	Length
1.	"It Gonna Come"		5:26
2.	"Preacherman"	Gardot, Chuck Staab	4:31
3.	"Morning Sun (For Ezra Richardson)"		5:06
4.	"Same to You"		4:59
5.	"Don't Misunderstand"	Gardot, Jesse Harris	4:15
6.	"Don't Talk"		4:17
7.	"If Ever I Recall Your Face"		6:52
8.	"Bad News"		4:38
9.	"She Don't Know"		3:59
10.	"Once I Was Loved"		4:49
Total length:			48:52

The Artist's Cut Edition
No.	Title	Writer(s)	Length
1.	"Don't Misunderstand"	Gardot, Jesse Harris	4:40
2.	"Don't Talk"		4:11
3.	"It Gonna Come"		5:31
4.	"Bad News"		4:57
5.	"She Don't Know"		3:55
6.	"Palmas Da Rua"		0:50
7.	"Same To You"		4:28
8.	"No Man's Prize"		4:49
9.	"March For Mingus"		1:02
10.	"Preacherman"	Gardot, Chuck Staab	6:16
11.	"Morning Sun"		5:05
12.	"If Ever I Recall Your Face"		6:51
13.	"Once I Was Loved"		4:50
14.	"After The Rain"		3:08
15.	"Burying My Troubles"		7:45
Total length:			68:18

Japanese Edition
No.	Title	Writer(s)	Length
16.	"Preacherman" (Radio Edit)	Gardot, Chuck Staab	3:36
Total length:			71:54

== Personnel ==
- Melody Gardot – vocals
- The Waters Sisters – choir
- Vinnie Colaiuta – drums
- Dean Parks – guitar
- Larry Goldings – piano
- Maxime Le Guil – recording & mixing

== Charts ==
=== Weekly charts ===
Chart (2015)	Peak position
Australian Albums (ARIA)	80
Australian Jazz & Blues Albums (ARIA)	1
Austrian Albums (Ö3 Austria)	16
Belgian Albums (Ultratop Flanders)	14
Belgian Albums (Ultratop Wallonia)	12
Canadian Albums (Billboard)	10
Danish Albums (Hitlisten)	38
Dutch Albums (Album Top 100)	12
French Albums (SNEP)	5
German Albums (Offizielle Top 100)	11
Greek Albums (IFPI)	14
Irish Albums (IRMA)	29
Italian Albums (FIMI)	52
Japanese Albums (Oricon)	59
New Zealand Albums (RMNZ)	20
Norwegian Albums (VG-lista)	14
Polish Albums (ZPAV)	15
Portuguese Albums (AFP)	20
Scottish Albums (OCC)	28
Spanish Albums (PROMUSICAE)	30
Swedish Jazz Albums (Sverigetopplistan)	1
Swiss Albums (Schweizer Hitparade)	3
UK Albums (OCC)	31
UK Jazz & Blues Albums (OCC)	2
US Billboard 200	124
US Top Jazz Albums (Billboard)	1
US Traditional Jazz Albums (Billboard)	1

=== Year-end charts ===
Chart (2015)	Position
Australian Jazz & Blues Albums (ARIA)	12
Belgian Albums (Ultratop Flanders)	149
Belgian Albums (Ultratop Wallonia)	105
French Albums (SNEP)	52
US Top Jazz Albums (Billboard)	15
