= Hailey Tuck =

- Born: April 25, 1990 (age 36); Austin, Texas, U.S.
- Genres: Alt-jazz
- Occupation: Singer
- Label: Sony Music
- Website: www.haileytuck.com

Hailey Tuck (born April 25, 1990) is an alt-jazz singer from Austin, Texas.

== Career ==
Inspired by 1920s silent film actress and dancer Louise Brooks, Tuck moved to Paris at the age of eighteen after dropping out of a Baptist military boarding school. She spent her days in vintage clothing markets and nights singing in jazz bars. In April 2014, she released her debut EP, Hailey Tuck, and performed in Europe and Asia, including Cheltenham Jazz Festival in the UK and Umea Jazz Festival in Sweden. Her four sold-out shows at the Duc Des Lombards in Paris were featured live on the national radio station TSF. She also supported Jamie Cullum at La Cigale.

Tuck released her second EP, So in Love, in October 2014. She made her New York City debut at Joe's Pub in January 2015. Then in March 2015 she released her third EP, Delancey Street, which featured musicians Eric Harland on drums and Joe Sanders on bass.

== Junk ==
Tuck released her debut album, Junk, on CD, LP, and digital download on May 4, 2018. It is a mix of cover songs and original material. It was produced by Larry Klein, mixed by Tim Palmer, and published on the Sony Music record label.

Tuck + Cover, a follow-up EP with additional cover songs, was also released in 2018.

== Discography ==
=== Singles ===
Year	Title
2017	Please Come Home For Christmas
2021	Coltrane

=== EPs as lead artist ===
Year	Title
2012	Sad Cafe
2014	Hailey Tuck
2014	So in Love
2015	Delancey Street
2018	Tuck + Cover
2020	Coquette

=== EPs as featured artist ===
Year	Title	Artist
2014	SuperMarket (feat. Dimie Cat & Hailey Tuck)	Bart&Baker feat. Dimie Cat & Hailey Tuck

=== Studio albums ===
Year	Title
2018	Junk
