= Kandace Springs =

American jazz and soul singer and pianist

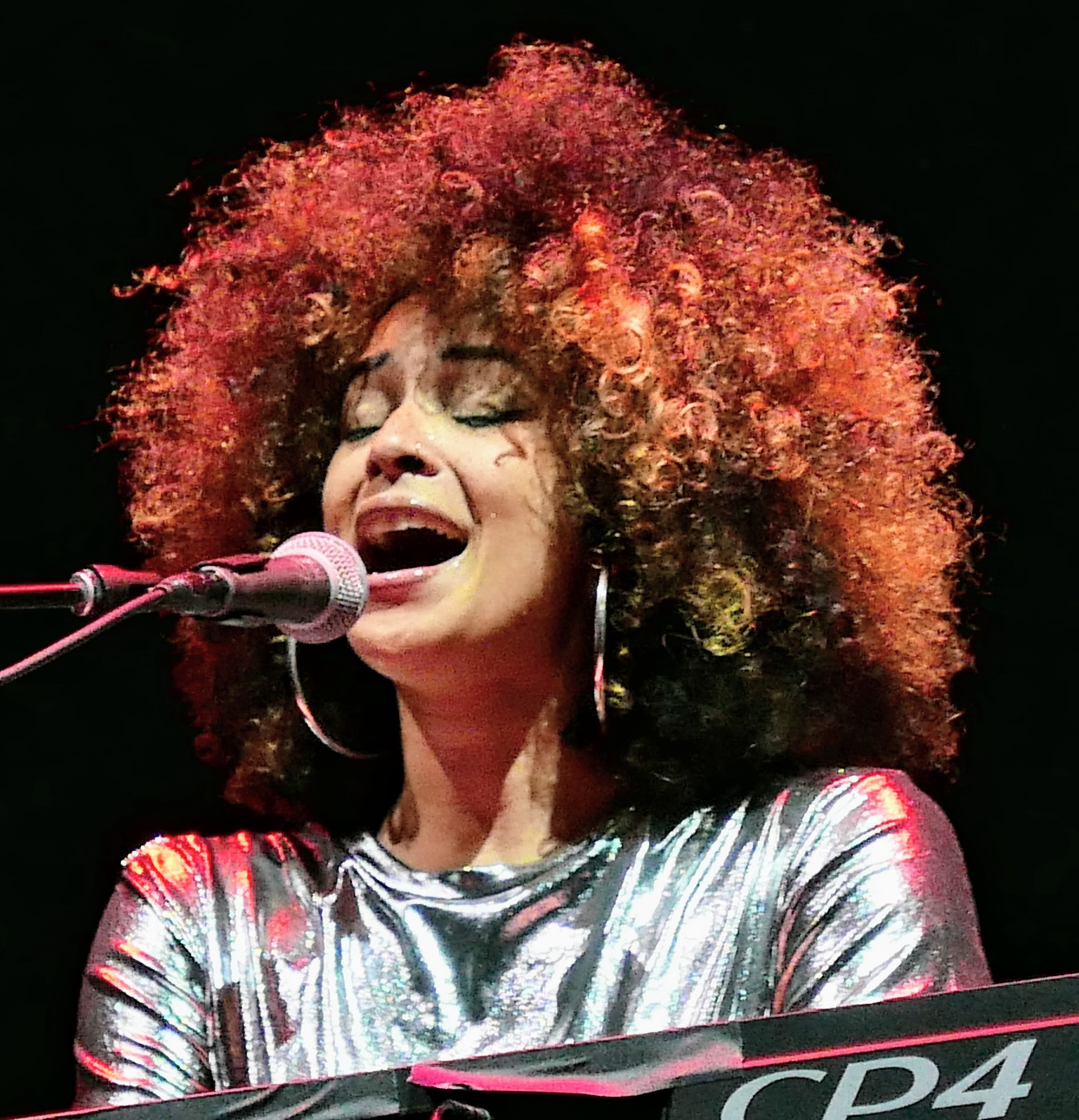
- Springs performing in 2018

Background information
- Born: Kandace Springs; January 18, 1989 (age 36); Nashville, Tennessee, US
- Genres: Vocal jazz, soul music
- Occupations: Singer, pianist, songwriter
- Instruments: Vocals, piano
- Years active: 2014–present
- Labels: Blue Note Records
- Website: www.kandacesprings.com

Kandace Springs (born January 18, 1989) is an American jazz and soul singer and pianist. She has released six studio albums.

== Biography ==
Kandace Springs was born in Nashville, Tennessee, United States, in 1989. Her father Scat Springs was a session singer in Nashville. She has two sisters. At the age of ten she started following piano lessons. She grew up listening to jazz and soul singers like Nina Simone. She was noted for performing Sam Smith's Stay with Me on the internet. She moved to New York City to work with Carl Sturken and Evan Rogers. She believes that music can touch people, spread a message, keep the world sane.

In 2014, she released her self-titled debut EP for the jazz label Blue Note Records. It was produced by Pop & Oak. Love Got in the Way was her first music video. She collaborated with Ghostface Killah on his 2014 single Love Don't Live Here No More. She performed live on several TV shows: the Late Show with David Letterman, Jimmy Kimmel Live!, The Tonight Show Starring Jimmy Fallon and Later... with Jools Holland. Prince asked her to perform with him on stage.

For her 2016 album, Soul Eyes, she kept working with Sturken and Rogers, but she also attracted producer Larry Klein, who praised her as a natural talent. On smooth ballads like Place to Hide and relaxed mid-tempo songs like Talk to Me, she accompanied herself on the piano. Collaborating artists were trumpeter Terence Blanchard, guitarists Dean Parks and Jesse Harris, and drummer Vinnie Colaiuta. Her 2018 album Indigo was produced by Karriem Riggins. It combines the vocal jazz tradition with modern R&B influences and a trumpet solo by Roy Hargrove.

On January 31, 2020, Springs released the lead single, "Pearls", off her third studio album, The Women Who Raised Me. The album was released in March 2020. The Women Who Raised Me is a covers album featuring renditions of songs made famous by some of history's most iconic vocalists: Ella Fitzgerald, Roberta Flack, Astrud Gilberto, Lauryn Hill, Billie Holiday, Diana Krall, Carmen McRae, Bonnie Raitt, Sade, Nina Simone, and Dusty Springfield.

== Discography ==
Albums

- Soul Eyes (Blue Note, 2016)
- Indigo (Blue Note, 2018)
- The Women Who Raised Me (Blue Note, 2020)
- My Name Is Sheba (Subplay Creative, 2022)
- Run Your Race (SRP Records, 2024)
- Lady in Satin (SRP Records, 2025)

EPs

- Kandace Springs (Blue Note, 2014)

Collaborations

- 2014 Love Don't Live Here No More (with Ghostface Killah)
- 2015 Stay Clear (with Black Violin)
- 2016 New York Minute (with Lang Lang)
- 2017 Daydream (with Ambrose Akinmusire)
- 2018 Faded (with Kings of Tomorrow)
