= My One and Only Thrill =

Studio album by Melody Gardot
- Released: March 16, 2009
- Studios: Sage & Sound (Hollywood); Market Street (Santa Monica, California); Capitol (Hollywood) (Note: Strings)
- Genres: Jazz; blues
- Length: 48:07
- Labels: Verve; Universal Classics and Jazz
- Producer: Larry Klein

Melody Gardot chronology
Live from SoHo (2009)	My One and Only Thrill (2009)	The Absence (2012)

Singles from My One and Only Thrill
- 1. "Who Will Comfort Me" Released: March 17, 2009; 2. "Baby I'm a Fool" Released: April 7, 2009; 3. "Your Heart Is as Black as Night" Released: February 22, 2011

My One and Only Thrill is the second studio album by American singer and songwriter Melody Gardot. It was released on March 16, 2009, by Verve Records. Three singles were released from the album: "Who Will Comfort Me", "Baby I'm a Fool", and "Your Heart Is as Black as Night". All tracks are original, except "Over the Rainbow" (originally performed by Judy Garland in the 1939 film The Wizard of Oz), which is included as a tribute to her grandmother. It features string arrangements by Vince Mendoza, who, along with producer Larry Klein, is known for his works with Joni Mitchell. My One and Only Thrill received three Grammy Award nominations: Instrumental Arrangement Accompanying Vocalist(s) for the title track (Mendoza), Best Engineered Album, Non-Classical (Helik Hadar and Al Schmitt), and Producer of the Year, Non-Classical (Klein). The album has sold over 1.5 million copies worldwide.

A deluxe edition was released in November 2009, which consists of a digipak including an orchestral version of "If the Stars Were Mine" and an additional EP with five tracks recorded live at a radio concert in Paris, as well as an extended booklet. A second deluxe edition, the Starwatch edition, was released in November 2010. This version includes three bonus "Chill Out Mix" tracks and instead of the live EP it includes the Bye Bye Blackbird EP, four tracks recorded with British jazz guitarist David Preston.

== Composition ==
Keeping the dark piano jazz style, the album incorporates several elements of samba and Brazilian music, which Gardot considers major influences. Regarding the slightly quiet and always smooth sound, she was quoted saying that, because of her health problems, not many instruments could be used. She added that it was a very logical process. The album is mainly sung in English, except for the French-language track "Les étoiles" ("The Stars").

== Critical reception ==
Professional ratings
Aggregate scores
Source	Rating
Metacritic	71/100
Review scores
Source	Rating
AllMusic	4/5 stars
All About Jazz	4.5/5 stars
The Guardian	3/5 stars
laut.de	4/5 stars
Mojo	4/5 stars
Q	3/5 stars
Uncut	3/5 stars
The Times	4/5 stars
Toronto Star	3.5/5 stars
Tom Hull	B+

My One and Only Thrill received generally positive reviews from music critics. At Metacritic, which assigns a normalized rating out of 100 to reviews from mainstream publications, the album received an average score of 71, based on 10 reviews.

AllMusic remarked that "These are slight, subtle progressions but what impresses is how thoroughly My One and Only Thrill lives up to the promise of her debut, offering another album that is as enchanting in its sound as it is in its substance", awarding the album with four out of five stars. The Times gave the album four out of five stars and described it as "an exceptional album and anyone who thought the great age of the torch singer was long over should lend an ear". Ian Patterson writing for All About Jazz added, "Gardot blurs the line between the beauty and pain of loving; hope and hopelessness are thinly disguised mirror images, and romance can be something as elusive as mist, but yet something powerful and all consuming. These songs are poems of beautiful and affecting simplicity, and they leave a taste that is wonderfully bitter sweet."

Michael Quinn of BBC commented, "My One and Only Thrill is the spellbinding follow up to Gardot's compelling debut, Worrisome Heart, and eloquently confirms her as a supreme songwriting talent possessed of a truly sublime voice." Will Layman of PopMatters observed, "Melody Gardot is singer with a great sound -- intimate rather than overblown, tinged with smoke rather than hype, a retro-ish kind of now. My One and Only Thrill is a quiet, blue-tinged collection of ten original songs and one choice cover. It is a sophisticated, jazz-steeped pop record..."

== Commercial performance ==
My One and Only Thrill debuted at number 42 on the US Billboard 200 with 11,000 copies sold in its first week, earning Gardot her highest-peaking album on the chart (until The Absence reached number 33 in 2012), as well as her best sales week. By April 2010, the album had sold 117,000 copies in the United States. The album debuted at number 40 on the UK Albums Chart for the week ending March 28, 2009, eventually peaking at number 12 in late May 2009. It was certified gold by the British Phonographic Industry (BPI) on July 22, 2013, denoting shipments in excess of 100,000 copies.

The album was successful across continental Europe, where it reached number one in Sweden, as well as the top five in Belgium's Wallonia region, France, Germany, and Norway, the top 10 in Denmark, and the top 20 in Finland, the Netherlands, Poland, Spain, and Switzerland. As of April 2015, My One and Only Thrill had sold over 1.5 million copies worldwide.

== Track listing ==
All tracks are written by Melody Gardot, except where noted.

No.	Title	Writer(s)	Length
1.	"Baby I'm a Fool"		3:30
2.	"If the Stars Were Mine"		2:48
3.	"Who Will Comfort Me"		4:56
4.	"Your Heart Is as Black as Night"		2:42
5.	"Lover Undercover"		4:24
6.	"Our Love Is Easy"	Gardot, Jesse Harris	5:28
7.	"Les Etoiles"		3:18
8.	"The Rain"	Gardot, Jesse Harris	3:21
9.	"My One and Only Thrill"		6:10
10.	"Deep Within the Corners of My Mind"		3:19
11.	"Over the Rainbow"	Harold Arlen, Yip Harburg	4:33
12.	"If the Stars Were Mine" (orchestral version)		3:13

iTunes Store and Japanese edition bonus track
No.	Title	Writer(s)	Length
13.	"Pretend I Don't Exist"	Gardot, Jesse Harris	3:09

Deluxe edition bonus EP: Live in Paris
No.	Title	Writer(s)	Length
13.	"The Rain"	Gardot, Jesse Harris	5:11
14.	"Ain't No Sunshine"	Bill Withers	5:41
15.	"Baby I'm a Fool"		3:42
16.	"My One and Only Thrill"		6:28
17.	"Love Me Like a River Does"		6:12

Starwatch edition bonus tracks
No.	Title	Writer(s)	Length
13.	"Our Love Is Easy" (Chill Out Mix)	Gardot, Jesse Harris	4:46
14.	"Baby I'm a Fool" (Chill Out Mix)		4:35
15.	"My One and Only Thrill" (Chill Out Mix)		6:19

Starwatch edition bonus EP: Bye Bye Blackbird
No.	Title	Writer(s)	Length
1.	"Get Out of Town"	Cole Porter	3:03
2.	"Someday My Prince Will Come"	lyrics: Larry Morey; music: Frank Churchill	1:12
3.	"Bye Bye Blackbird"	lyrics: Mort Dixon; music: Ray Henderson	3:11
4.	"Summertime"	lyrics: DuBose Heyward, Ira Gershwin; music: George Gershwin	3:56

== Personnel ==
- Melody Gardot – guitar, piano, vocals
- Gary Foster – alto saxophone
- Bryan Rogers – tenor saxophone, backing vocals
- Larry Goldings – Hammond B3 organ
- Patrick Hughes – trumpet, backing vocals
- Andy Martin – trombone
- Behn Gillece – vibraphone
- Nico Abondolo – double bass
- Drew Dembowski – double bass
- Larry Klein – bass guitar, backing vocals
- Ken Pendergast – bass guitar, backing vocals
- Vinnie Colaiuta – drums
- Charlie Patierno – drums, backing vocals
- Paulinho da Costa – percussion

Strings

- Harp – Amy Shulma, Marcia Dickstein
- Cello – Ira Glansheek, Christina Soule, Cecilia Tsan, Larry Corbett
- Violin – Joel Derouin, Roberto Cani, Audrey Solomon, Darius Campo, Kevin Connolly, Katia Popov, Liane Mautner, Miran Kojian, Natalie Leggett, Robin Olson, Irina Voloshina
- Viola – Dave Walther, Roland Kato, Alma Fernandez, Samuel Formicola, Jody Rubin

Production

- Larry Klein – producer
- Helix Hadar – engineer
- Al Schmitt – mixing
- Steve Genewick – mixing

== Charts ==
=== Weekly charts ===
Chart (2009–10)	Peak position
Australian Albums (ARIA)	23
Australian Jazz & Blues Albums (ARIA)	1
Austrian Albums (Ö3 Austria)	44
Belgian Albums (Ultratop Flanders)	31
Belgian Albums (Ultratop Wallonia)	5
Danish Albums (Hitlisten)	9
Dutch Albums (Album Top 100)	20
European Albums (Billboard)	18
Finnish Albums (Suomen virallinen lista)	20
French Albums (SNEP)	4
German Albums (Offizielle Top 100)	4
Greek International Albums (IFPI)	5
Irish Albums (IRMA)	34
Japanese Albums (Oricon)	27
New Zealand Albums (RMNZ)	11
Norwegian Albums (VG-lista)	2
Polish Albums (ZPAV)	18
Spanish Albums (Promusicae)	19
Scottish Albums (Official Charts)	15
Swedish Albums (Sverigetopplistan)	1
Swedish Jazz Albums (Sverigetopplistan)	1
Swiss Albums (Schweizer Hitparade)	17
UK Albums (Official Charts)	12
UK Jazz & Blues Albums (Official Charts)	1
US Billboard 200	42
US Top Jazz Albums (Billboard)	2

=== Year-end charts ===
Chart (2009)	Position
Australian Jazz & Blues Albums (ARIA)	7
Belgian Albums (Ultratop Wallonia)	76
Danish Albums (Hitlisten)	23
European Albums (Billboard)	61
French Albums (SNEP)	17
Swedish Albums (Sverigetopplistan)	1
UK Albums (OCC)	169
US Top Jazz Albums (Billboard)	12

Chart (2010)	Position
Australian Jazz & Blues Albums (ARIA)	8
Danish Albums (Hitlisten)	94
European Albums (Billboard)	37
French Albums (SNEP)	52
German Albums (Offizielle Top 100)	31
Swedish Albums (Sverigetopplistan)	19
US Top Jazz Albums (Billboard)	6

Chart (2011)	Position
Australian Jazz & Blues Albums (ARIA)	43

Chart (2012)	Position
Australian Jazz & Blues Albums (ARIA)	42

Chart (2015)	Position
Australian Jazz & Blues Albums (ARIA)	37

== Certifications ==
Region	Certification	Certified units/sales
Australia (ARIA)	Gold	35,000^{^}
Denmark (IFPI Danmark)	Gold	15,000^{^}
France (SNEP)	2× Platinum	270,000
Germany (BVMI)	Platinum	200,000^{^}
Greece (IFPI Greece)	Gold	7,500^{^}
New Zealand (RMNZ)	Gold	7,500^{^}
Norway (IFPI Norway)	Platinum	30,000^{*}
Poland (ZPAV)	Platinum	20,000^{*}
Sweden (GLF)	2× Platinum	80,000^{‡}
United Kingdom (BPI)	Gold	100,000^{*}
Summaries
Europe (IFPI)	Platinum	1,000,000^{*}
^{*} Sales figures based on certification alone.^{^} Shipments figures based on certification alone.^{‡} Sales+streaming figures based on certification alone.
