= Lang Lang discography =

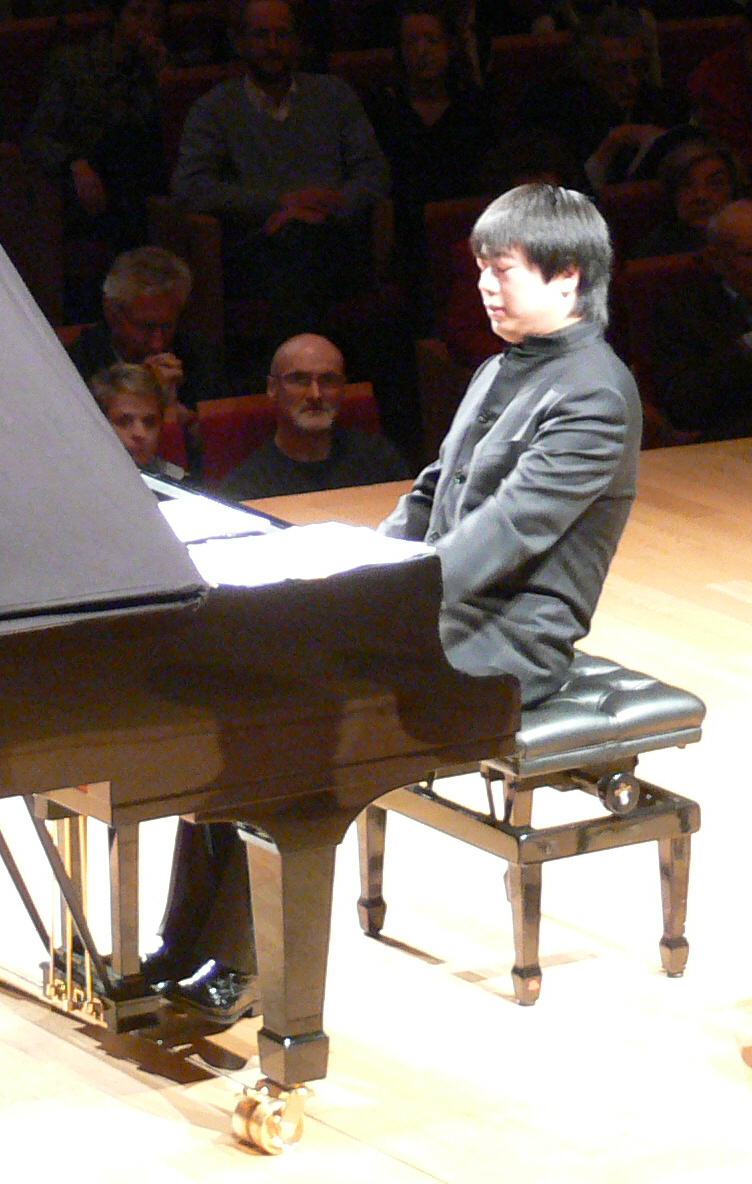
- Lang Lang performing live in March 2008
- Studio albums: 9
- Soundtrack albums: 2
- Live albums: 4
- Compilation albums: 1
- Singles: 1
- Contributions: 3

The discography of classical pianist Lang Lang includes nine studio albums, four live albums, one single, one compilation, two soundtracks, and three contributions to releases not under his name. His first album was released in 2000 under Telarc International Corporation. In 2003, he signed a contract with Deutsche Grammophon and released several albums with them. In February 2010, Lang Lang signed with Sony Classic.

Lang Lang has recorded two soundtracks, including the score by Alexandre Desplat for the 2007 movie The Painted Veil. He has contributed to several albums of other musicians, including Andrea Bocelli's greatest hits album, The Best of Andrea Bocelli: Vivere. For the piece "Time for Dreams," on his 2008 album Dreams of China, Lang Lang collaborated with German electronica musician Christopher von Deylen. While Lang Lang has also worked with singers like Taiwanese R&B star Jay Chou and Chinese folk singer Song Zuying, none of these collaborations have been published.

Lang Lang has achieved considerable commercial and critical success. His albums have ranked on Billboard charts, including the Top Classical Albums chart.

== Studio albums ==
Year	Album details	Notes
2003	Tchaikovsky, Mendelssohn: First Piano Concertos: Released: July 15, 2003; Label: Deutsche Grammophon; Format: CD, DD	Performed with Daniel Barenboim and the Chicago Symphony Orchestra
2005	Rachmaninov: Piano Concerto No. 2; Paganini Rhapsody: Released: February 8, 2005; Label: Deutsche Grammophon; Format: CD, DD	Performed with Valery Gergiev and the Orchestra of Mariinsky Theatre
2006	Memory: Released: March 14, 2006; Label: Deutsche Grammophon; Format: CD, DD	Includes work by Frédéric Chopin, Franz Liszt, Wolfgang Amadeus Mozart, and Robert Schumann
2007	Dragon Songs: Released: January 9, 2007; Label: Deutsche Grammophon; Format: CD, DD, DVD	Includes traditional Chinese music and work by the Central Philharmonic Society, Lü Wencheng, He Lüting, Sun Yiqiang, Du Mingxin, Deng Yuxian, Zu Jianer, Zhao Jiping, and Wang Jianmin; Performed with Fan Wei, Ji Wei, Zhang Jiali, and Long Yu and the China Philharmonic Orchestra
2007	Beethoven: Piano Concertos Nos. 1 & 4: Released: May 8, 2007; Label: Deutsche Grammophon; Format: CD, DD, DVD	Performed with Christoph Eschenbach and the Orchestre de Paris; Nominated for the Best Instrumental Soloist at the 50th Grammy Awards
2008	Dreams of China: Released: June 24, 2008; Label: Deutsche Grammophon; Format: CD	Includes "Time for Dreams", a collaboration with German electronica musician Christopher von Deylen; This CD was not released in North America.
2008	Hess: Concerto for Piano and Orchestra: Released: August 4, 2008; Label: Universal Classics and Jazz; Format: CD, DD	World premiere recording of new work by Nigel Hess. Performed with Christopher Warren-Green and the London Chamber Orchestra. Commissioned by the Prince of Wales in memory of his grandmother, Queen Elizabeth the Queen Mother.; Only released in the UK.
2008	Chopin: The Piano Concertos: Released: September 9, 2008; Label: Deutsche Grammophon; Format: CD, DD	Performed with Zubin Mehta and the Vienna Philharmonic
2011	Liszt - My Piano Hero: Released: September 5, 2011; Label: Sony Classical; Format: CD, DVD	"Lang pays a very personal tribute to Franz Liszt, to who he has had a special relationship following his very first encounter with the composer at age two. Since this introduction - watching a "Tom & Jerry" cartoon featuring Liszt's "Hungarian Rhapsody" No. 2 - Lang Lang has gone on to share his passion for classical music and the music of Liszt with concert audiences around the globe. To celebrate his piano hero's bicentenary, Lang Lang has selected some of the most famous, virtuosic and poetic solo pieces, concluding with a stunning new recording of the Piano Concerto No. 1 = accompanied by the Vienna Philharmonic and Valery Geegiev".
2012	Lang Lang - The Chopin Album: Released: October 22, 2012; Label: Sony Classical; Format: CD, Deluxe CD (incl. Bonus DVD), Vinyl	The Chopin Album – Lang Lang's third album for Sony Classical – includes the second set of Chopin’s Études (op. 25), the Andante spianato & Grande Polonaise and a selection of shorter works as well as three Nocturnes and the Waltz op. 64 no. 1, popularly known as the “Minute” Waltz.
2013	Prokofiev: Piano Concerto No. 3 - Bartók: Piano Concerto No. 2: Released: October 7, 2013; Label: Sony Classical; Format: CD, DVD	First recorded collaboration with Simon Rattle and the Berlin Philharmonic; Recorded in the Philharmonie Berlin in February and April 2013; The album is accompanied by a captivating 60-minute documentary The Highest Level unveiling the excitement, adrenalin, highs and challenges experienced by the artists and their team creating these recordings. The documentary as well as a complete filmed version of the Prokofiev Concerto were released in October on DVD and Blu-ray.
2014	The Mozart Album: Released: October 17, 2014; Label: Sony Classical; Format: CD, Deluxe CD, DVD/Blu-Ray - “Lang Lang at the Royal Albert Hall”, Vinyl	The first disc in this two-disc set was recorded in spring 2014 in the Goldener Saal of Vienna's Musikverein and sees Lang Lang and Nikolaus Harnoncourt perform Mozart's two famous piano concerti – K 453 in G major and K491 in C minor – together with the Vienna Philharmonic Orchestra under Nikolaus Harnoncourt. The second disc in the album showcases Lang Lang as soloist in Mozart's three early piano sonatas together with the Rondo alla turca, the Allegro in F major K 1c and the Konzertstück in F major, K 33b.; Sony Classical released the concert “Lang Lang at the Royal Albert Hall” on DVD, Blu-ray and digitally along with The Mozart Album in October.
2015	Lang Lang in Paris: Released: October 9, 2015; Label: Sony Classical; Format: CD, Deluxe CD (incl. Bonus DVD), DVD/Blu-Ray - "Lang Lang live in Versailles", Vinyl	A studio recording of the repertoire was made in the Salle Liebermann at the Opéra Bastille; Including music by F. Chopin and P.I. Tchaikowsky; The DVD shows a special recital of Lang Lang at the Hall of Mirrors in the Palace of Versailles on June 22, 2015
2016	New York Rhapsody: Released: September 16, 2016; Label: Sony Classical; Format: CD, DVD/Blu-Ray-"New York Rhapsody - Live from Lincoln Center", Vinyl	Featuring guest artists Andra Day, Herbie Hancock, Jason Isbell, Jeffrey Wright, Jerry Douglas, Kandace Springs, Lindsey Stirling, Lisa Fischer, Madeleine Peyroux, and Sean Jones.; Following the release of the album, a concert special Live From Lincoln Center aired on PBS on November 25, 2016, as part of the PBS Arts Fall Festival
2017	Romance: Released: October 13, 2017; Label: Sony Classical; Format: CD	Lang Lang's brilliant showmanship here is channeled through some of the piano's most intimate, tender moments. Romance is an album that captures his playing at its most personal.
2019	Piano Book: Released: March 29, 2019; Label: Deutsche Grammophon; Format: CD, LP	Includes music by Bach, Beethoven, Chopin, Debussy, Grieg, Mendelssohn, Mozart, and Schubert
2021	Bach: Goldberg Variations: Released: April 20, 2020; Label: Deutsche Grammophon; Format: CD	Includes 4 CDs: two record a live performance, and two record a one-take rehearsal

== Live albums ==
Year	Album details	Notes
2000	Lang Lang: Live At Seiji Ozawa Hall, Tanglewood: Released: November 30, 2000; Label: Telarc International Corporation; Format: CD, DD	Includes work by Joseph Haydn, Sergei Rachmaninoff, Johannes Brahms, Pyotr Ilyich Tchaikovsky, and Mily Balakirev
2002	Rachmaninoff: Piano Concerto No. 3 / Scriabin: Etudes: Released: April 23, 2002; Label: Telarc; Format: CD, DD	Includes a Chinese folk song and work by Rachmaninoff and Alexander Scriabin; Performed live at The Royal Albert Hall in London with Yuri Temirkanov and the St. Petersburg Philharmonic
2004	Lang Lang: Live at Carnegie Hall: Released: March 2, 2004; Label: Deutsche Grammophon; Format: CD, DD, DVD	Includes work by Frédéric Chopin, Tan Dun, Haydn, Franz Liszt, Franz Schubert, and Robert Schumann; Includes "Horses," a piece arranged and performed by Lang Lang and his father, Lang Guo-ren, who performs the erhu
2010	Lang Lang Live in Vienna: Released: August 24, 2010; Label: Sony Classic; Format: CD, Deluxe CD (with excerpts from the concert), Blu-ray, DVD, Vinyl, and DD	Note that the DVD on the Deluxe CD version does not have many songs.; Performed at the Vienna Musikverein

== Singles ==
Year	Album details	Notes
2010	Polonaise in A-flat major, Op. 53 "Heroic": Released: March 16, 2010; Label: Sony Classic; Format: MP3	Recorded live at the Vienna Musikverein; A portion of the proceeds have gone to UNICEF as a benefit for the 2010 Haiti earthquake
2022	We Don't Talk About Bruno (From "Encanto"): Released: July 29, 2022; Label: Deutsche Grammophon; Format: CD, DD	

== Compilations ==
Year	Album details	Notes
2008	The Magic of Lang Lang: Released: February 5, 2008; Label: Deutsche Grammophon; Format: CD, DD	A 13-track compilation containing live and studio recordings

== Soundtracks ==
Year	Album details	Notes
2006	The Banquet: Released: September 11, 2006; Label: Dg Imports; Format: CD, DD	Soundtrack by Tan Dun
2007	The Painted Veil: Released: January 9, 2007; Label: Deutsche Grammophon; Format: CD, DD	Soundtrack by Alexandre Desplat
2010	Gran Turismo 5: The Official Soundtrack: Released: November 26, 2010; Label: Sony Masterworks; Format: CD, DD	First Original Game Soundtrack by Piano Instruments

== Contributions ==
Year	Album details	Notes
2005	Breathe: The Relaxing Piano: Released: August 23, 2005; Label: Telarc International Corporation; Format: CD, DD	Lang Lang plays Johannes Brahms's "Intermezzo for Piano in A minor, Op. 118, No. 1" and "Romance for piano in F major, Op. 118, No. 5".
2007	Piano Moods: A Collection of Romantic Melodies: Released: May 8, 2007; Label: Deutsche Grammophon; Format: CD, DD	Lang Lang plays Robert Schumann's "Kinderszenen, Op. 15: No. 7 Traumerei" and "Kinderszenen, Op. 15: No. 1 Von fremden Landern und Menschen".
2007	Andrea Bocelli, The Best of Andrea Bocelli: Vivere: Released: October 30, 2007; Label: Decca Records; Format: CD, DD	Lang Lang plays "Io ci sarò".
2008	Mike Oldfield, Music Of The Spheres: Released: March 14, 2008; Label: Mercury Records; Format: CD	Lang Lang plays on six of the album's fourteen tracks
2012	2Cellos, In2ition: Released: November 9, 2012 (Japan); Label: Sony Masterworks; Format: CD, DD	Lang Lang plays "Clocks"
2015	2Cellos, Celloverse: Released: January 9, 2015; Label: Sony Masterworks; Format: CD, DD	Lang Lang plays "Live and Let Die".
