= Larry Klein =

American bassist and record producer (born 1956)

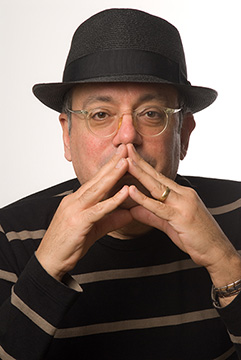

Background information
- Born: 1956 (age 69–70)
- Genres: Jazz; pop
- Occupations: Musician; record producer; songwriter
- Instruments: Bass guitar; guitar; keyboards
- Years active: 1970s–present
- Website: larrykleinmusic.net

Larry Klein is an American musician, songwriter, and record producer. He is based in Los Angeles.

He began his career as a bassist, playing with jazz artists Willie Bobo, Freddie Hubbard, Carmen McRae, Joe Henderson, Bobby Hutcherson, Wayne Shorter, Herbie Hancock, Bobby McFerrin, and Dianne Reeves. As a bass player he has also worked with artists such as Bob Dylan, Robbie Robertson, Peter Gabriel, Don Henley, Lindsey Buckingham, Randy Newman, and Joni Mitchell.

As a record producer, Klein is a four-time Grammy Award winner, for his work on albums by Joni Mitchell and Herbie Hancock, and has been nominated for six additional Grammy Awards, including three nominations for Producer of the Year. Klein has produced more than 100 albums during his career, for musicians such as Joni Mitchell, Herbie Hancock, Shawn Colvin, Holly Cole, Madeleine Peyroux, The Innocence Mission, Melody Gardot, Walter Becker and Tracy Chapman.

== Early life and musical career ==
Klein grew up in Monterey Park, California, the son of an aerospace engineer father and a stay-at-home mother. When Klein was in junior high school, he was enrolled in the Community School for the Performing Arts, an after-school music program at the University of Southern California. Klein studied music composition and music theory through the program and began playing in various bands.

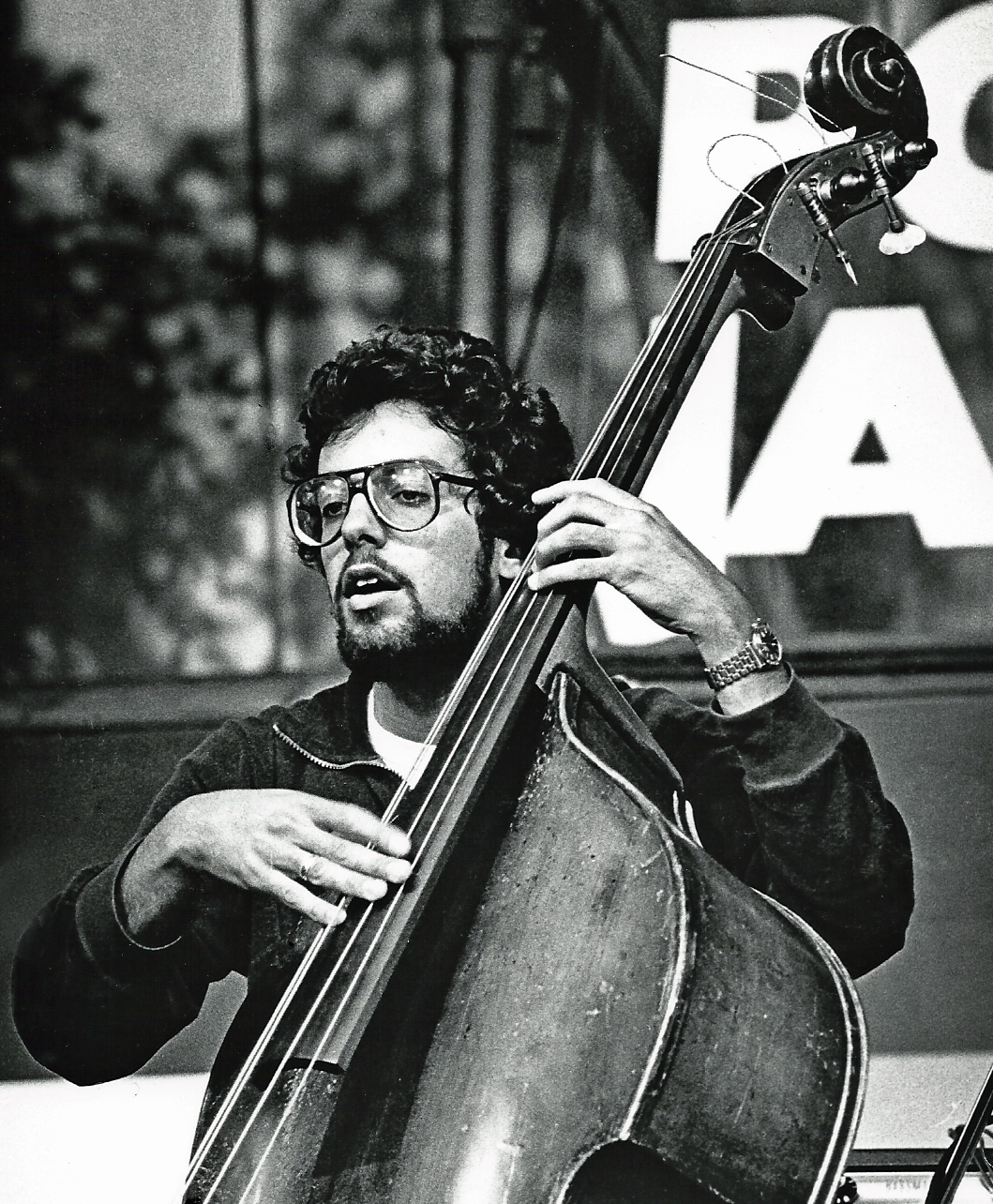
Larry Klein performing at the 1978 Pori Jazz Festival

After graduating from high school early and enrolling at California State University, Klein began to work with various jazz and Latin music groups. His first job as a touring musician was with Freddie Hubbard. He also played with artists such as Carmen McRae, Wayne Shorter, Willie Bobo and Joe Henderson during this period. After five years of touring, Klein landed a year-long residency as the bass player for the TV program The Merv Griffin Show.

=== Marriage and collaborations with Joni Mitchell ===
In 1982, Klein began working as a bassist on Joni Mitchell's Wild Things Run Fast. During the sessions, the two became romantically involved and married the same year. It was during his marriage with Mitchell that Klein established himself as a record producer, and began to branch out beyond jazz into pop, rock, soul, and alternative genres.

In 1985, Klein, Mike Shipley, and Thomas Dolby produced Mitchell's Dog Eat Dog. He secured his first solo production with The Cars' bassist Benjamin Orr's 1986 solo album The Lace, also playing bass and keyboards and programming the drums. In 1988, Klein co-produced both Mitchell's Chalk Mark in a Rain Storm and The Innocence Mission's self-titled album. He also co-produced Mitchell's 1991 album Night Ride Home and Shawn Colvin's Fat City in 1992.

Klein and Mitchell separated while in the midst of making Mitchell's Turbulent Indigo album. The two continued to work together through their divorce in 1994, and Turbulent Indigo would win the 1995 Grammy for Best Pop Album. Despite their divorce, they collaborated on the 2000 album Both Sides Now, which won the 2000 Grammy for Best Traditional Pop Vocal Album. They also collaborated on Mitchell's 2002 album Travelogue, which was composed entirely of orchestral explorations of songs taken from Mitchell's body of work.

During this time, Klein continued to work as a bassist, most notably on Don Henley's singles "The Boys of Summer" and "The Heart of the Matter", Peter Gabriel's So (also touring with Gabriel), Robbie Robertson's self-titled debut, and Bobby McFerrin's self-titled debut. He also played with Tracy Chapman on her self-titled debut, on her follow-up albums Crossroads and Matters of the Heart, on Bob Dylan's 1988 album Down in the Groove, and on Roy Orbison's posthumous release King of Hearts.

=== Production era (1995–2010) ===
Klein became known for his work with female artists during his marriage to Mitchell. In 1997, he produced Holly Cole's Dark Dear Heart and Mary Black's Shine. In 2000, he produced Julia Fordham's Concrete Love, and in 2004 he produced Madeleine Peyroux's Careless Love.

In 2005, Klein met Brazilian singer Luciana Souza while she was performing at the Los Angeles Philharmonic. The two married in August 2006. He produced Souza's 2007 album The New Bossa Nova. Klein also produced Herbie Hancock's River: The Joni Letters, a 2007 re-imagining of ex-wife Mitchell's work. The album features vocals from artists including Norah Jones, Corinne Bailey Rae, Tina Turner, Leonard Cohen, Luciana Souza, Wayne Shorter, and Mitchell herself. River: The Joni Letters won the 2008 Grammy for Album of the Year, as well as for Best Contemporary Jazz Album. In 2008, Klein co-wrote and produced Walter Becker's Circus Money, and played bass on Tracy Chapman's Our Bright Future.

In 2009, Klein produced Madeleine Peyroux's Bare Bones and produced a duet with Celine Dion and Zachary Richard on Richard's album Last Kiss. He was nominated for Producer of the Year (Non-Classical) at the 52nd Grammy Awards for his work on albums including Melody Gardot's My One and Only Thrill.

Klein continued his work with Herbie Hancock, producing The Imagine Project. The album won the 2010 Grammy for Best Pop Collaboration with Vocals.

=== Strange Cargo (2011–present) ===
In 2011, Klein partnered with Universal Music Group and Decca Label Group to create the imprint label Strange Cargo. The imprint's first signing was Thomas Dybdahl. The label has released albums by Dybdahl, Adam Cohen and Rebecca Pidgeon. Along with music supervisor Chris Douridas, he worked on the 2014 soundtrack album for the Showtime series House of Lies, which was released on Strange Cargo.

Klein produced Pidgeon's Slingshot and Curtis Stigers' Let's Go Out Tonight in 2012. In 2013, he produced Thomas Dybdahl's What's Left is Forever, Madeleine Peyroux's The Blue Room, Florence K's I'm Leaving You, Alfie Boe's Trust, Ana Moura's Desfado, and Eddy Mitchell's Heros.

Klein produced Bobby Bazini's debut U.S. album, Where I Belong, in August 2014. He also produced Billy Childs' Map of The Treasure: Reimagining Laura Nyro. He produced Melody Gardot's 2015 studio album Currency of Man, and her 2020 studio album Sunset in the Blue. He produced Lizz Wright's 2015 album Freedom & Surrender, also co-writing seven songs and playing keyboards and guitar. He produced Lang Lang's 2016 album New York Rhapsody, which featured artists including Lisa Fischer, Jason Isbell, Madeleine Peyroux, Herbie Hancock, Robbie Robertson, and actor Jeffrey Wright. He and Billy Childs received a Grammy nomination for arranging one of the tracks, which weaved together the Lou Reed song "Dirty Boulevard" with Leonard Bernstein's "Somewhere" from West Side Story. He produced Kandace Springs' 2016 debut album Soul Eyes, and her 2020 album The Women Who Raised Me.

In 2019, he received his third Grammy nomination for Producer of the Year, for producing Madeleine Peyroux's Anthem, The Book of Longing by Luciana Souza, Junk by Hailey Tuck, Thomas Dybdahl's All These Things, and actor Jeff Goldblum's debut jazz album The Capitol Studios Sessions. Also in 2019, Klein produced the collaborative album Same Sky, bringing together 23 artists from 17 countries, with the musicians gathering in France.

== Awards ==
Klein has won four Grammys: Best Pop Album in 1996 for Joni Mitchell's Turbulent Indigo, Best Traditional Pop Vocal Album for Mitchell's Both Sides Now in 2001, Album of the Year and Best Contemporary Jazz Album for Herbie Hancock's album, River: The Joni Letters in 2008.

Year	Nominee / work	Award	Result
1996	Turbulent Indigo	Grammy Award for Best Pop Vocal Album	Won
2001	Both Sides Now	Grammy Award for Best Traditional Pop Vocal Album	Won
2008	River: The Joni Letters	Grammy Award for Album of the Year	Won
2008	River: The Joni Letters	Grammy Award for Best Contemporary Jazz Album	Won
2010	Larry Klein	Grammy Award for Producer of the Year, Non-Classical	Nominated
2011	"Imagine"	Grammy Award for Best Arrangement, Instrumental and Vocals	Nominated
2015	Map to the Treasure: Reimagining Laura Nyro	Grammy Award for Best Jazz Vocal Album	Nominated
2016	Larry Klein	Grammy Award for Producer of the Year, Non-Classical	Nominated
2017	"Somewhere (Dirty Blvd) (Extended Version)"	Grammy Award for Best Arrangement, Instrumental and Vocals	Nominated
2019	Larry Klein	Grammy Award for Producer of the Year, Non-Classical	Nominated

== Work in films ==
Klein has professional credits for film soundtracks including The King of Comedy, Raging Bull, Grace of My Heart, Toy Story, Sweet November and Brokeback Mountain, as well as the theme song for the television series Felicity.

== Personal life ==
Klein and Joni Mitchell were married in November 1982, and divorced in 1994. In 2006, Klein married Luciana Souza. Klein and Souza have one son, Noah.
