= Who Will Comfort Me =

Single by Melody Gardot

from the album My One and Only Thrill
- Released: February 16, 2009
- Genre: Jazz, blues
- Length: 4:56
- Label: Verve/UCJ
- Songwriter(s): Melody Gardot
- Producer(s): Larry Klein

Melody Gardot singles chronology
"If the Stars Were Mine" (2009)	"Who Will Comfort Me" (2009)	"Baby I'm a Fool" (2009)

"Who Will Comfort Me" is a song written and composed by American jazz singer-songwriter Melody Gardot. It was released as the lead single for her second studio album My One and Only Thrill. A live rendition of the song was also recorded and released on her Live from SoHo EP.

== Song information ==
The lyrics are very simple, consisting in Gardot asking who will comfort her weary soul. Musically, it combines finger-snapping, scat singing and several percussion instruments.

== Track listings ==
CD single

1. "Who Will Comfort Me" – 4:58

German 7" Promo single

1. "Who Will Comfort Me" – 4:58
2. "Over the Rainbow" – 4:33

Al Schmitt Mix Promo single

1. "Who Will Comfort Me" – Radio Edit (Al Schmitt Mix) – 3:42

== Chart positions ==
Chart (2009)	Peak Position
U.S. Billboard Smooth Jazz Songs	6
