= Worrisome Heart =

Studio album by Melody Gardot
- Released: 2006 (independent); February 26, 2008 (Verve)
- Recorded: November 2005 – May 2006
- Studio: Morningstar Studios (Norriton, PA)
- Genre: Jazz; blues
- Length: 32:17
- Label: Verve
- Producer: Melody Gardot, Glenn Barratt

Melody Gardot chronology
Some Lessons: The Bedroom Sessions (2005)	Worrisome Heart (2006)	Live from SoHo (2009)

Professional ratings
Review scores
Source	Rating
AllMusic	4/5 stars
BBC Music	Favorable
The Boston Globe	Favorable
The Guardian	4/5 stars
laut.de	5/5 stars
Metro	3/5 stars
The New York Times	Favorable
Washington Post	Favorable
The Times	4/5 stars
Tom Hull	B+

Worrisome Heart is the debut studio album by American singer and songwriter Melody Gardot. It was released independently in 2006 and later re-released in 2007 and 2008 by Verve Records in the United States and by Universal Classics and Jazz (UCJ) internationally. The album contains new recordings of songs previously released on Gardot's first extended play, Some Lessons: The Bedroom Sessions (2005), as well as previously unreleased tracks.

== Background ==
Speaking of how the album first came to be made, Gardot told British writer Pete Lewis of Blues & Soul in November 2008: "It was created independently of a record company. It was made privately. So my only intention, or my only goal, was to make a record that at the end of the day I was happy with. And the way that the instrumentation was decided on was based on what I heard in my head, and what I thought would feel the best. So I guess having it released is kinda like having somebody publish your diary in a way!"

The tracks "Wicked Ride", "Some Lessons" and "Goodnite" were re-recorded for this album and are not the versions that appear on the Some Lessons: The Bedroom Sessions EP. The 2006 independent release has a longer running time of 41:40 as it included the new version of "Wicked Ride", as well as the hidden track "Sorry State", which were omitted when released by Verve Records. The album cover and track listing were changed for a promotional release in 2007 and again for its eventual official release under the label in 2008.

== Reception ==
JazzTimes review by A. D. Amorosi stated, "But, though she plays so very well with others, if she was alone on a street corner, hooting to the moon, you’d hear the same subtle drama and dynamics. Forget the story. Desire the singer." Michael G. Nastos of AllMusic wrote, "Melody Gardot's debut recording, released in 2006, came two years after she suffered a near fatal automobile accident, the differently able Gardot triumphing in accomplishing what many others, including her, could only dream of. This project has her singing and playing guitar and a little piano, but more so presenting this project of all original material. Gardot has an interesting personal story, but even more intriguing music that straddles the line between lounge jazz, folk, and cowgirl songs." Geoffrey Himes of Washington Post added, "Melancholy or irreverent, Gardot's vocals fit snugly into the understated jazz arrangements. But what really sells these songs are the juicy melodies. If the chorus hook of her "Sweet Memory" reminds one of Carole King's "Sweet Seasons," that's just a measure of the high standard she meets on all of her originals."

== Track listing ==
All tracks are written by Melody Gardot.

No.	Title	Length
1.	"Worrisome Heart"	4:21
2.	"All That I Need Is Love"	2:36
3.	"Gone"	2:50
4.	"Sweet Memory"	3:21
5.	"Some Lessons"	5:23
6.	"Quiet Fire"	4:13
7.	"One Day"	2:02
8.	"Love Me Like a River Does"	4:06
9.	"Goodnite"	3:04
10.	"Twilight"	1:01
Total length:		33:14

2006 independent release
No.	Title	Length
1.	"Sweet Memory"	3:23
2.	"All That I Need Is Love"	2:39
3.	"Wicked Ride"	4:30
4.	"Some Lessons"	5:24
5.	"Gone"	2:55
6.	"Quiet Fire"	4:13
7.	"Worrisome Heart"	4:23
8.	"One Day"	2:04
9.	"Love Me Like a River Does"	4:08
10.	"Goodnite"	3:06
11.	"Twilight" (contains hidden track "Sorry State")	4:55
Total length:		41:40

== Personnel ==
- Melody Gardot – vocals, guitar, piano, vox organ, producer
- Joel Bryant – Fender Rhodes, Hammond organ, Wurlitzer
- Ron Kerber – clarinet, tenor saxophone
- Matt Cappy – trumpet
- Patrick Hughes – trumpet
- Stan Slotter – trumpet
- Jef Lee Johnson – guitar
- Barney McKenna – guitar
- Mike Brenner – lap steel guitar
- Kurt Johnston – dobro
- David Mowry – dobro
- Paul Klinefelter – bass
- Ken Pendergast – bass
- Diane Monroe – violin
- Charlie Patierno – drums, percussion

Technical

- Glenn Barratt – engineer, mixing, producer
- Dave Gerhart – engineer
- Bernie Grundman – mastering

Credits adapted from AllMusic.

== Charts ==
=== Weekly charts ===
Album (2008–2010)	Peak position
Australian Albums (ARIA)	93
Australian Jazz & Blues Albums (ARIA)	4
French Albums (SNEP)	8
German Albums (Offizielle Top 100)	44
Japanese Albums (Oricon)	86
Norwegian Albums (VG-lista)	31
Swedish Albums (Sverigetopplistan)	25
Swedish Jazz Albums (Sverigetopplistan)	2
Swiss Albums (Schweizer Hitparade)	81
UK Albums (OCC)	172
UK Jazz & Blues Albums (OCC)	7
US Billboard 200	80
US Top Jazz Albums (Billboard)	2

"Worrisome Heart" song (2008)	Peak Position
U.S. Billboard Smooth Jazz Songs	2
U.S. Billboard Hot 100 Singles	80

=== Year-end charts ===
Chart (2008)	Position
Australian Jazz & Blues Albums (ARIA)	25
US Top Jazz Albums (Billboard)	7

Chart (2009)	Position
Australian Jazz & Blues Albums (ARIA)	18
French Albums (SNEP)	98
US Top Jazz Albums (Billboard)	31

Chart (2010)	Position
Australian Jazz & Blues Albums (ARIA)	25

== Certifications ==
Region	Certification	Certified units/sales
France (SNEP)	Gold	50,000^{*}
Germany (BVMI)	Gold	100,000^{^}
United Kingdom (BPI)	Silver	60,000^{‡}
^{*} Sales figures based on certification alone.^{^} Shipments figures based on certification alone.^{‡} Sales+streaming figures based on certification alone.
