= Jesse Harris =

American musician (born 1969)

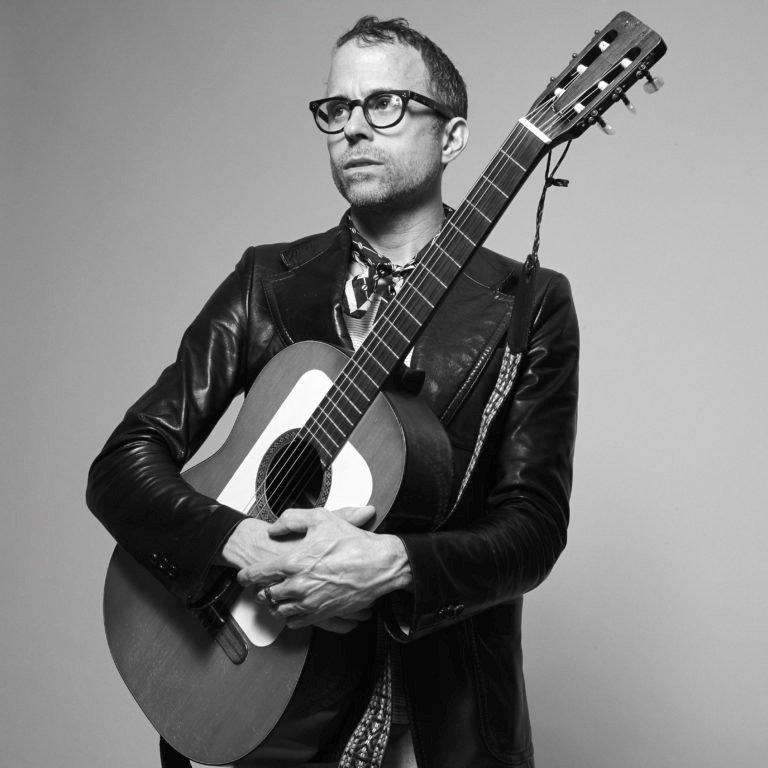
- Jesse Harris by Becky Siegel

Background information
- Born: October 24, 1969 (age 57); New York City, U.S.
- Genres: Pop; folk; jazz
- Occupations: Songwriter; producer; musician
- Years active: 1995–present
- Labels: Artwork; Secret Sun
- Website: jesseharrismusic.com

Jesse Harris (born October 24, 1969) is an American songwriter, producer, and guitarist. He has worked with Norah Jones (whose version of his song "Don't Know Why" won him the Grammy for Song of the Year in 2003), Melody Gardot, Madeleine Peyroux, and Lizz Wright.

== Early life and education ==
Harris and his twin sister were born in New York City. He attended Riverdale Country School in New York City. He graduated from Cornell University in 1991 with a Bachelor of Arts degree in English.

== Career ==
Jesse Harris's music has been described as a "blend [of] folk, rock, jazz, and world rhythms."

Harris gave guitar lessons and performed in musical groups before he formed the duo Once Blue with singer-songwriter Rebecca Martin. This was the first group he was in and his first experience writing for another singer. Once Blue released its self-titled debut on EMI Records in 1995, and nine additional songs were included in the album's re-release in 2003.

Harris signed as a songwriter with Sony Publishing in 1998 and then made three self-released recordings with his new band, The Ferdinandos, consisting of Harris, Tony Scherr, Tim Luntzel, and Kenny Wollesen. The band released two more albums on sublabels of Verve Records. Harris recorded three solo albums Mineral, Feel, and Watching the Sky on his own label, Secret Sun Recordings.

In 2003, he was awarded a Grammy Award for Song of the Year for "Don't Know Why", performed by Norah Jones. Jones's album, Come Away with Me, includes five of Harris's compositions: "Don't Know Why", "Shoot the Moon", "One Flight Down", "I've Got to See You Again", and "The Long Day Is Over". Harris plays guitar throughout the whole album. Jones and Harris have collaborated numerous times since then; Jones has been a guest on many of his albums and he appears as guitarist on almost all of her albums. Harris appears as a guitarist on Bright Eyes' 2005 album, I'm Wide Awake, It's Morning, as well as Motion Sickness. He contributed songwriting to Jones's 2008 release, The Fall, as well.

In 2007, Harris delivered songs for the soundtrack of the film The Hottest State, written and directed by actor Ethan Hawke. The soundtrack featured new versions of his songs by Jones, Willie Nelson, Emmylou Harris, Feist, Cat Power, M. Ward, The Black Keys, Bright Eyes, Brad Mehldau, and Rosario Ortega. He also acted in the film.

In August 2010, Harris released his album Through the Night and recorded a new version of his song "The Secret Sun" for a Corona beer commercial.

Harris's 11th album, Sub Rosa, recorded in Rio de Janeiro, was released in July 2012 and features guest vocals from Conor Oberst, Melody Gardot, and Norah Jones. Harris's 12th album, the stripped down Borne Away, was released on June 25, 2013.

Harris and Jones appear together in the 2014 David Wain/Michael Showalter film, They Came Together, performing his song "It Was the Last Thing on Your Mind", which Harris produced. In 2016, he appeared in Showalter's film Hello, My Name Is Doris, performing his song, "Anything Was Possible".

In 2013, Harris joined John Zorn's Song Project, along with Mike Patton, Sofia Rei, and Sean Lennon, writing lyrics for various Zorn compositions and singing them at festivals worldwide with a band featuring Marc Ribot on guitar, John Medeski on keyboards, and Zorn conducting. Two of the group's albums have been released by Tzadik Records. Harris continued working with John Zorn in the beginning of the 2020s. Zorn and Harris also collaborated on a project which featured singer and violinist Petra Haden alongside the Julian Lage Trio (for whom Harris has produced two albums: Arclight and Modern Lore), plus Harris on guitar. The resulting albums, Music for Petra (Petra Haden Sings the Zorn/Harris Songbook) and Songs For Petra, were released in 2020 on Tzadik. Most recently, Zorn and Harris wrote a musical, Love Songs. A live album of the songs, featuring Haden, was released by Tzadik.

Harris already worked with Petra Haden as interpreter of his songs; the album Seemed Like a Good Idea – Petra Haden Sings Jesse Harris released in 2016 on Sunnyside.

Other artists who have recorded Harris's songs include Smokey Robinson, George Benson, Pat Metheny, Kandace Springs, and Solomon Burke. Songwriting collaborations have included Madeleine Peyroux, Melody Gardot, Maria Gadú, Maya Hawke, and Vinicius Cantuária. Production credits include albums for Forro in the Dark and Sasha Dobson.

In 2017, Harris formed Cosmo, a group for only his instrumental compositions, with CJ Camerieri (trumpet, flugelhorn, and French horn), Will Graefe (guitar), Jeremy Gustin (drums), Benjamin Lazar Davis (bass), Michael Boshcen (trombone), and Harris (guitar). They are currently working on an album with producer Jason Lader.

Harris's album Aquarelle was recorded in Lisbon, Portugal, released in September 2018, and features Gustin and Graefe, Ricardo Dias Gomes (bass, keyboards), Petra Haden, Valerie June, Sophia Brous, Thomas Bartlett, Rob Moose, Jesse Carmichael, Marcelo Camelo, and Jason Lader. On Surpresa, in 2021, Harris closely collaborated again with Vinicius Cantuária.

He continues to work on multiple projects, both as a bandleader and as a producer. In 2022, Harris's Cosmo released the album But When?, and in 2023, Spring Song. Other production credits for Harris include albums for Papooz (2024's Resonate), Maya Hawke, and Gabi Hartmann. A new solo album, If You Believed In Me, featuring orchestral arrangements by Maycon Ananias, plus guest appearances by Norah Jones, Jake Sherman, and Marine Quéméré, was released in November 2025.

== Discography ==
Release year	Album	Label	Artist	Details
2025	If You Believed in Me	Artwork	Jesse Harris	
2025	La femme aux yeux de sel	Sony Masterworks France	Gabi Hartmann	songwriter, producer, guitarist, drummer, engineer
2024	Resonate	Wide Awake	Papooz	songwriter, producer, guitarist
2024	Little Song Lines EP	Sony Masterworks France	Gabi Hartmann	songwriter, guitarist
2024	Dusk	Cosmic Artists	Gaby Moreno	songwriter, guitarist
2024	Resonate Augmented	Wide Awake	Papooz	songwriter, producer, guitarist
2024	Chaos Angel	Mom + Pop	Maya Hawke	songwriter
2024	dreaming	Secret Sun	Andrew Kamel	producer, guitarist
2024	Unspoken	Secret Sun	Anson Jones	producer, songwriter, guitarist, drummer
2024	Love Songs Live	Tzadik	John Zorn / Jesse Harris	lyricist, producer, mixing engineer
2024	Petite Folie EP	Secret Sun	Jesse Harris feat. Anson Jones, Lisa Ducasse, Ëda Diaz & Lau Noah	
2024	Single "Ride On/Wild Horse"	Secret Sun	Jesse Harris	
2024	Ahlam EP		Maryam Turkey	songwriter, producer, guitarist, bassist, keyboardist
2024	Clipped Wings EP	Mom + Pop	Maya Hawke	songwriter, guitarist
2023	Cosmo – Spring Song	Secret Sun	Cosmo	Leader
2023	Gabi Hartmann (Self-titled)	Sony Masterworks France	Gabi Hartmann	producer, songwriter, guitarist, engineer
2022	But When?	Secret Sun	Cosmo	Leader
2022	Time Is A Healer	Secret Sun	Todd Clouser	producer, guitarist
2022	Alegoría	Metamorfosis	Gaby Moreno	songwriter
2022	Trio	Secret Sun	Jon Dryden	producer, songwriter
2022	Singles "Milles Rivages" / "Buzzing Bee"	Sony Masterworks France	Gabi Hartmann	producer, songwriter, guitarist
2022	Silver Balloon	Secret Sun	Jesse Harris	
2021	Surpresa with Vinicius Cantuária	Sunnyside	Jesse Harris	
2021	Single "Da Vinci"		Demira	songwriter
2021	…'Til We Meet Again	Blue Note	Norah Jones	songwriter, guitarist
2021	The Springs		Star Rover	producer, bassist, keyboards
2021	Single "Maybe Today, Maybe Tomorrow"	Metamorfosis	Gaby Moreno	songwriter
2021	EP Always Seem To Get Things Wrong	Asterios	Gabi Hartmann	producer, songwriter, guitarist
2021	Single "Blue Hippo"	Mom + Pop	Maya Hawke	songwriter, producer, bassist
2020	Everlasting Day	Secret Sun	Jesse Harris	
2020	Tura Lura	Cascine	Harrington, Gustin and Zahn	producer, guitarist, keyboardist
2020	Blush	Mom + Pop	Maya Hawke	songwriter, producer, guitarist
2020	Songs for Petra…	Tzadik	John Zorn & Jesse Harris	songwriter, producer, guitarist, keyboardist
2020	Angelheaded Hipster…	BMG	Various Artists	singer, guitarist
2020	Sunset in the Blue	Universal	Melody Gardot	songwritr
2019	Songs Never Sung	Secret Sun	Jesse Harris	
2019	Single "Always Seem To Get Things Wrong"	Secret Sun	Gabi Hartmann	songwriter, producer, guitarist
2019	Singles "To Love a Boy" / "Stay Open"	Secret Sun	Maya Hawke	songwriter, producer, guitarist, pianist
2019	Harmony	Blue Note	Bill Frisell	songwriter
2018	Aquarelle	Secret Sun	Jesse Harris	
2018	Once Blue Live at the Handlebar – live recorded in 1996	Core Port	Once Blue with Rebecca Martin	Co-leader
2018	Modern Lore	Mack Avenue	Julian Lage	producer, musician
2018	Indigo	Blue Note	Kandace Springs	songwriter, guitarist
2018	Live in Europe	Universal	Melody Gardot	Songwriter
2018	Single "Milk"	Grand Jury	Samia	producer, piano, keys
2017	Music for Chameleons	Sunnyside	Jesse Harris	
2017	Love Song	Ren's Records	Ren	producer, songwriter, guitarist
2017	Lust for Life	Polydor/Interscope	Lana Del Rey	songwriter
2017	Single "Amuleto"	Warner Brasil	Tia	guitarist
2016	Arclight	Mack Avenue	Julian Lage	producer
2016	Soul Eyes	Blue Note	Kandace Springs	songwriter, guitarist
2016	Petra Haden Sings Jesse Harris – Seemed Like a Good Idea with Petra Haden	Sunnyside	Petra Haden & Jesse Harris	producer, songwriter, guitarist, singer
2015	Hello, My Name Is Doris	Roadside Attractions	film	guitarist, songwriter, actor
2015	No Wrong No Right with Star Rover	Dangerbird	Jesse Harris	
2015	Currency of Man	Universal	Melody Gardot	songwriter, guitarist
2015	Love Song Covers	Universal	Tomoyo Harada	songwriter, singer
2015	Freedom & Surrender	Concord	Lizz Wright	songwriter, guitarist
2015	Forro in the Dark Plays Zorn	Tzadik	Forro in the Dark	producer
2015	The Song Project Live at Le Poisson Rouge	Tzadik	John Zorn	songwriter, singer, guitarist
2015	Single "Dia Especial"	Som Livre	Tiago Iorc	producer, piano
2014	They Came Together soundtrack EP, featuring "It Was the Last Thing On Your Mind" performed by Norah Jones	Lionsgate Records, Lionsgate Films	film	guitarist, songwriter, producer, actor
2014	Way To Be	Universal Japan	Amanda Brecker	producer, guitarist, keyboardist, songwriter
2014	Esmeraldas	Warner Brasil	Tia	producer, guitarist, keyboardist
2014	Daggers	Downtown	Ex Cops	songwriter
2014	The Song Project	Tzadik	John Zorn	songwriter, singer, liner notes
2013	Borne Away	Secret Sun	Jesse Harris	
2013	Zeski	Som Livre	Tiago Iorc	guitarist, songwriter
2013	True Crime EP	Downtown	Butter The Children	producer
2012	The Absence	Universal	Melody Gardot	songwriter
2012	Sub Rosa	Dangerbird	Jesse Harris	
2012	On a Ride	Nublu	Wax Poetic	songwriter
2012	Indio de Apartamento	Naïve	Vinicius Cantuária	songwriter, vocalist
2012	Al Posto del Mondo	Sony Music	Chiara Civello	songwriter
2012	Viento Y Sombra	EMI Latin America	Rosario Ortega	producer, songwriter, guitarist
2012	I Just Happen To Be Here	Biscoito Fino	Alexia Bomtempo	guitarist
2012	Bem Me Quer Mar Me Quer	Art House	Pierre Aderne	songwriter, guitarist
2011	O Que Você Quer Sabe de Verdade	EMI	Marisa Monte	Guitarist
2011	Berlin 13	ESL Music	Federico Aubele	songwriter
2011	Verano Maldito		Luis Ortega film	songwriter, singer, actor
2011	Blossom	Universal	Amanda Brecker	producer, guitarist
2011	Mais Uma Página	Som Livre	Maria Gadú	songwriter, guitarist, producer
2011	Little World	Tube Jam	Ila & The Happy Trees	guitarist
2010	There's a Storm Inside Featuring Dianne Reeves & Bob Mintzer	Sunnyside	Chico Pinheiro	songwriter
2010	Nikki	Decca	Nikki Yanofsky	producer, guitarist, songwriter
2010	Through the Night	Secret Sun / Mercer Street	Jesse Harris	
2010	Cosmo	Tzadik	Jesse Harris	
2010	The Rock and the Tide	Mom + Pop	Joshua Radin	songwriter
2010	Man Drawing The Light	Columbia Japan	Yuichi Ohata	producer, guitarist, songwriter
2010	Single "The Secret Sun"	Secret Sun	Jesse Harris	
2009	Watching the Sky	Mercer Street	Jesse Harris	
2009	The Fall	Blue Note	Norah Jones	songwriter, guitarist
2009	My One and Only Thrill	Universal	Melody Gardot	Songwrite
2009	Light a Candle	Natgeo	Forro in the Dark	songwriter, singer
2009	Trip	Jay‑Vee	The Verbs	songwriter
2009	Luminous Halo	Avex	Port Of Notes	producer, guitarist
2009	bonus track "Something Is Calling You"	Blue Note	Norah Jones	songwriter, guitarist
2008	Firesight	Verve	Jessie Baylin	Songwriter
2008	Like a Fire	Shout! Factory	Solomon Burke	songwriter, guitarist, vocalist
2008	Mais Uma Página	Som Livre / Slap	Maria Gadú	co-written and -produced two tracks, plays acoustic guitar on one
2008	Bonus track "We Were Free"	Blue Note	Priscilla Ahn	songwriter, guitarist
2008	Music From The Magic Shop	Warner Music Japan	Yuichi Ohata	producer, guitarist
2007	Not Too Late	Blue Note	Norah Jones	guitarist
2007	Feel	Velour	Jesse Harris	
2007	The Hottest State soundtrack, featuring Willie Nelson, Feist, Bright Eyes, Emmylou Harris, The Black Keys, M. Ward, Cat Power, Brad Mehldau, Norah Jones, Tony Scherr, and Rocha	Hickory, Think Films	film	songwriter, producer, guitarist, vocalist
2007	Arrivals	Bank Street Theatre	stage play	incidental music composer
2007	You	Hickory	Jessie Baylin	producer, songwriter, guitarist
2007	Summer Clouds, Summer Rain	Avex Japan	Miyuki Hatakeyama	producer, songwriter, guitarist, vocalist
2006	Slow New York	Manhattan	Richard Julian	harmonica
2006	Modern Romance	Secret Sun	Sasha Dobson	producer, songwriter, guitarist
2006	Twenty-three	Virgin	Tristan Prettyman	guitarist, songwriter
2006	Half the Perfect World	Rounder	Madeleine Peyroux	songwriter
2005	Mineral	Secret Sun	Jesse Harris	
2005	I'm Wide Awake, It's Morning	Saddle Creek	Bright Eyes	Guitarist
2005	Motion Sickness	Team Love	Bright Eyes	Guitarist
2005	Dreaming Wide Awake	Verve	Lizz Wright	songwriter
2005	Trouble Is Real	Warner	Johnathan Rice	guitarist, drummer, songwriter
2004	While the Music Lasts	Verve	Jesse Harris & the Ferdinandos	
2004	Careless Love	Rounder	Madeleine Peyroux	songwriter
2004	Feels Like Home	Blue Note	Norah Jones	guitarist
2003	The Secret Sun	BlueThumb / Verve	Jesse Harris & the Ferdinandos	
2003	Ken's Bar	DefStar Japan	Ken Hirai	songwriter, guitarist
2003	Rewind	Virgin	Ricky Fante	songwriter, guitarist
2003	Once Blue Reissue	EMI Toshiba	Once Blue with Rebecca Martin	co-leader, guitarist, vocalist
2002	Come Away with Me	Blue Note	Norah Jones	songwriter, guitarist
2002	Without You	Bean	Jesse Harris & the Ferdinandos	
2001	Crooked Lines	Bean	Jesse Harris & the Ferdinandos	
2001	First Sessions	Blue Note	Norah Jones	songwriter, guitarist
2001	The Colossus of Rhodes	DIW	Sean Wayland	guitarist
1999	Jesse Harris and the Ferdinandos	Bean	Jesse Harris & the Ferdinandos	
1999	Stranger Things Have Happened	Fresh Sound	Seamus Blake	guitarist
1999	Ancient Pleasures	BMG Denmark	Marie Frank	songwriter, guitarist
1998	Dragon Tales – TV show – opening theme song		TV Show	guitarist, songwriter
1996	Single "You Were Meant For Me"	Atlantic	Jewel	guitarist
1995	Once Blue	EMI	Once Blue with Rebecca Martin	co-leader of band, songwriter, guitarist, singer
1995	Tails	Geffen	Lisa Loeb	guitarist
1995	You Will Be You	Atlantic	The Hatters	guitarist
