= Melody Gardot =

American jazz singer (born 1985)

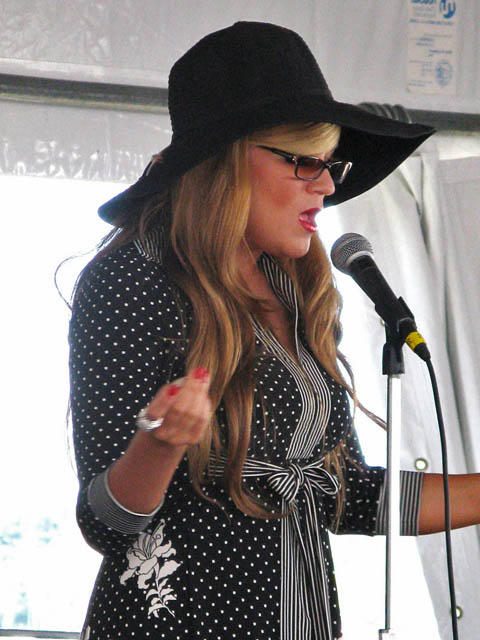
- Melody Gardot performing at the Newport Jazz Festival in August 2008

Background information
- Born: Melody Joy Gardot; February 2, 1985 (age 41); Princeton, New Jersey, United States
- Origin: Philadelphia, Pennsylvania, United States
- Genres: Jazz; blues; bossa nova; folk; pop
- Occupations: Musician; singer; songwriter; composer
- Instruments: Vocals; guitar; piano
- Works: Worrisome Heart; My One and Only Thrill; The Absence; Currency of Man
- Years active: 2004–present
- Labels: Verve; Decca
- Website: www.melodygardot.com
- Musical career
- Genres: Jazz; blues; bossa nova; folk; pop
- Instruments: Vocals; guitar; piano
- Labels: Verve; Decca

Melody Joy Gardot (/ˈmɛlədiɡɑːrˈdoʊ/); born February 2, 1985) is an American musician, singer, songwriter, and composer. Widely considered as one of the best jazz vocalists of her generation, she is known for her smoky contralto voice, understated vocal delivery, and a musical style that blends jazz with blues, bossa nova, folk, and pop influences. Gardot first gained attention in the mid-2000s and achieved international recognition with five studio albums: Worrisome Heart (2006), My One and Only Thrill (2009), The Absence (2012), Currency of Man (2015), and Sunset in the Blue (2020).

At the age of 19, Gardot was struck by a car and sustained a serious head injury, an event that proved pivotal in shaping her life and career. During her rehabilitation, music played a critical role in her recovery, leading her to become a strong advocate of music therapy. She has since visited hospitals and universities to discuss the therapeutic benefits of music in neurological and physical rehabilitation. In 2012, Gardot lent her name to a music therapy program in New Jersey.

Gardot often performs seated and wearing dark sunglasses to reduce sensory stimulation related to the lingering effects of her injuries. Throughout her career, she has toured extensively across Asia, Europe, and North America, collaborating with jazz ensembles and orchestras. Her work is frequently noted for its cinematic atmosphere, lyrical intimacy, and the revival of classic jazz aesthetics within a contemporary framework.

== Early life and education ==
Gardot was born in New Jersey and was brought up by her grandparents. Her grandmother was a Polish immigrant. Her mother, a photographer, traveled often, so they had few possessions and lived out of suitcases. Gardot studied fashion at the Community College of Philadelphia.

=== Accident and therapy ===
While riding her bicycle in Philadelphia in November 2003, Gardot was struck by a car and sustained head, spinal, and pelvic injuries. Confined to a hospital bed for a year, she needed to relearn simple tasks and was left oversensitive to light and sound. Suffering from short- and long-term memory loss, she struggled with her sense of time.

Encouraged by a physician who believed music would help heal her brain, Gardot learned to hum, then to sing into a tape recorder, and eventually to write songs.

For several years, she traveled with a physiotherapist and carried a transcutaneous electrical nerve stimulator to reduce pain.

Given her oversensitivity to sound, she chose quieter music. On the treadmill, she listened to bossa nova by Stan Getz, specifically "The Girl from Ipanema". Unable to sit comfortably at the piano, she learned to play guitar on her back. During her recovery, she wrote songs that became part of the self-produced EP Some Lessons: The Bedroom Sessions. Gardot was reluctant to record her songs at first, stating that they were too private for the public to hear, but relented and allowed her songs to be played on a Philadelphia radio station.

== Personal life ==
Gardot is a Buddhist, macrobiotic cook, and humanitarian. She speaks fluent French and some Portuguese in addition to her native English and considers herself a "citizen of the world".

In December 2025, she announced that she had become a mother.

== Music career ==
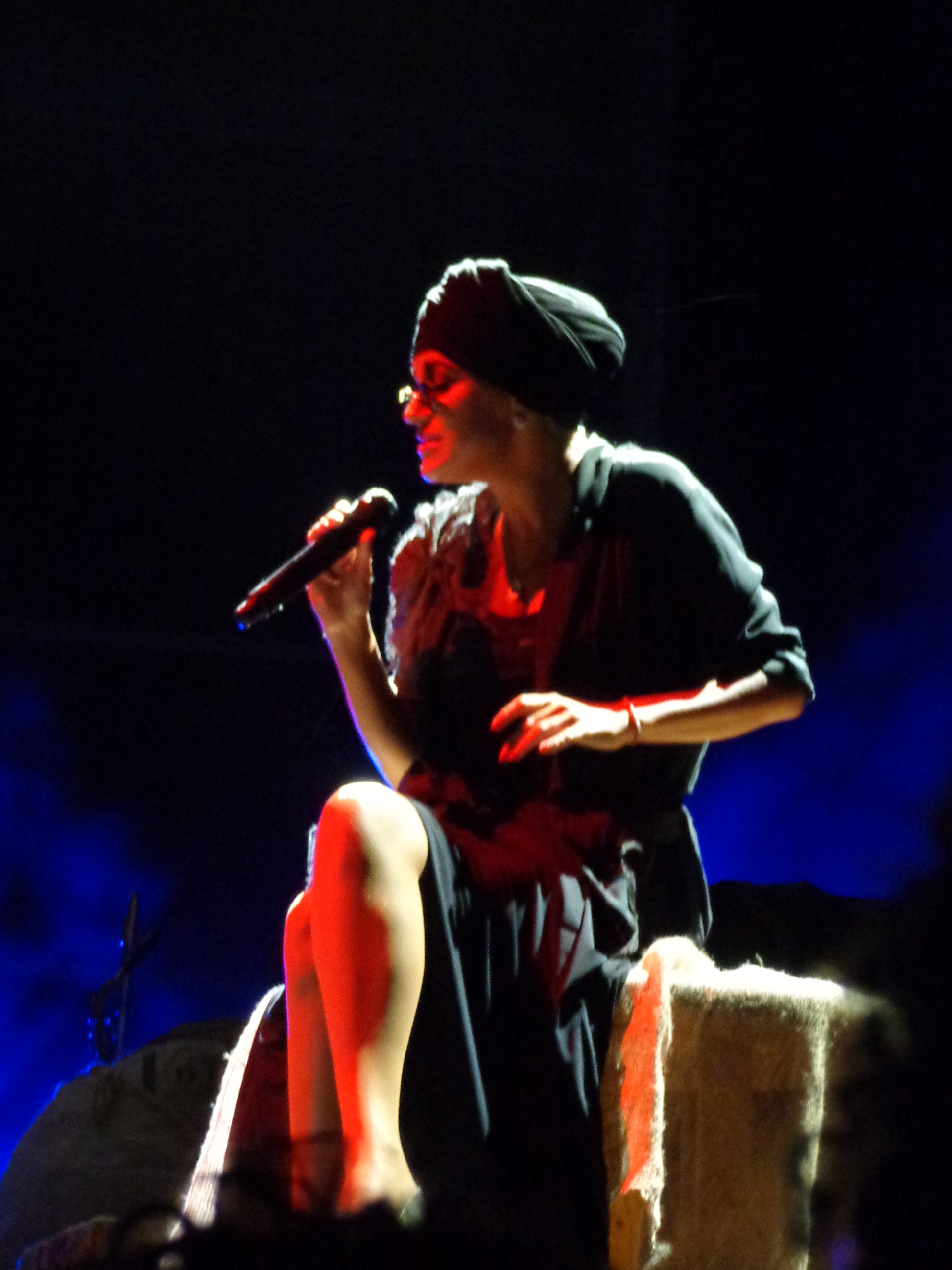
Gardot in concert, Portugal, 2012

Gardot began studying music at the age of nine and was exposed early to a wide range of musical styles. As a teenager, she developed as a live performer, playing piano in bars and clubs around Philadelphia by the age of 16. Performing several nights a week, she insisted on playing only music she admired, drawing on influences that ranged from classic pop and jazz artists such as The Mamas & the Papas and Duke Ellington to alternative rock acts including Radiohead.

At the age of 19, Gardot was seriously injured in a road accident and spent an extended period in hospital. During her recovery, she learned to play the guitar and began writing songs as part of her rehabilitation through music therapy. These early recordings were initially released as digital downloads on iTunes and later compiled on the EP Some Lessons: The Bedroom Sessions (2005). She began performing this material at small venues in Philadelphia, where her understated vocal style and introspective songwriting attracted increasing attention.

Gardot’s growing reputation led to interest from staff at WXPN, a public radio station operated by the University of Pennsylvania. Encouraged to submit a demo, her recordings eventually reached representatives of the Universal Music Group. She subsequently signed with Verve Records, marking a transition from independent artist to major-label recording musician.

Her debut studio album, Worrisome Heart (2006), presented a minimalist, jazz-oriented sound that emphasized mood, restraint, and emotional subtlety. The album was well received by critics and established her as a distinctive new voice in contemporary jazz. Gardot achieved broader international success with her second album, My One and Only Thrill (2009), produced by Larry Klein. Featuring orchestral arrangements and a more polished production, the album brought her significant commercial recognition, particularly in Europe, and positioned her as a leading figure in modern vocal jazz.

Gardot continued to evolve artistically with The Absence (2012), an album influenced by her travels in South America and North Africa. Drawing on elements of bossa nova, Latin music, and world music, the record expanded her sonic palette while maintaining her characteristic introspective tone. Her subsequent release, Currency of Man (2015), marked a shift toward a stronger emphasis on blues and soul, incorporating themes of social awareness and personal reflection.

In 2020, Gardot released Sunset in the Blue, recorded with producer Larry Klein and arranger Vince Mendoza. The album blended orchestral jazz textures with contemporary songwriting and was noted for its mature, reflective character. Throughout her career, Gardot has maintained a strong presence as a live performer, touring extensively across Europe, North America, and Asia, and appearing at major jazz festivals and concert halls.

Like other long-running recording artists, Gardot’s career has been marked by continual stylistic development rather than adherence to a single musical phase. Her body of work reflects a balance between tradition and innovation, combining classic jazz sensibilities with modern influences and personal narrative, and has contributed to her sustained critical and international recognition.

== Legacy ==
Gardot is regarded as one of the most distinctive and influential jazz vocalists of the early 21st century, praised for her hushed vocal delivery, restrained emotional expression, and synthesis of traditional jazz with blues, folk, and contemporary pop elements. Critics frequently compare her phrasing and tonal subtlety to classic singers such as Billie Holiday, Peggy Lee, and Nina Simone, while emphasizing her modern songwriting sensibility and cinematic atmosphere.

Gardot’s career is often cited as emblematic of the 21st-century revival of vocal jazz, particularly in Europe, where she has achieved sustained commercial and critical success. Her albums have regularly charted in France, Germany, Italy, and the Netherlands, and she has been credited with introducing a younger and more diverse audience to jazz music in non-English-speaking markets.

A central element of Gardot’s legacy is the role music played in her recovery following a near-fatal road accident at age 19. Her rehabilitation process—during which music was prescribed as a neurological therapy—has made her a widely cited case study in discussions of music therapy and neuroplasticity. She has spoken extensively at hospitals, universities, and medical conferences about the therapeutic value of music in physical and cognitive recovery.

In recognition of her advocacy, a music therapy program in New Jersey was named in her honor in 2012, marking a rare instance of a contemporary recording artist being institutionally associated with therapeutic practice. Her story is frequently referenced in academic literature addressing the intersection of art, medicine, and trauma recovery.

Gardot’s visual presentation has also become an enduring part of her artistic identity. Her use of dark sunglasses during performances—initially a medical necessity due to photophobia—has since been interpreted as a symbol of introspection and emotional privacy, influencing stage aesthetics among contemporary jazz and singer-songwriter performers.

Musically, Gardot is often cited by emerging jazz and crossover artists for her emphasis on space, silence, and emotional understatement rather than vocal virtuosity. Scholars and critics have noted that her work challenges dominant trends toward technical excess, instead prioritizing narrative intimacy and mood.

In popular and scholarly discourse alike, Gardot is recognized as a bridge between classic jazz traditions and contemporary songwriting, leaving a lasting imprint on modern vocal jazz, therapeutic music advocacy, and the global perception of jazz as a living and evolving art form.

== Awards and nominations ==
Year	Award	Category	Work	Result
2009	BBC Jazz Awards	Best International Artist	—	Nominated
2010	Echo Awards	International Female Jazz Singer of the Year	—	Won
2010	Victoires de la Musique	Album of the Year – Jazz	My One and Only Thrill	Nominated
2010	NRJ Music Awards	International Breakthrough of the Year	—	Nominated
2011	Prix Django Reinhardt	International Jazz Artist	—	Nominated
2012	Victoires du Jazz	Vocal Artist of the Year	—	Nominated
2013	BBC Jazz Awards	Best International Jazz Act	—	Nominated
2014	Jazz FM Awards	International Jazz Act of the Year	—	Nominated
2015	DownBeat Critics Poll	Rising Star – Vocalist	—	Nominated
2016	Echo Awards	International Female Jazz Singer of the Year	—	Won
2017	Jazz FM Awards	International Jazz Act of the Year	—	Nominated
2018	Académie Charles Cros	Coup de cœur (Critics’ Choice)	Live in Europe	Won
2019	Victoires du Jazz	Album of the Year – Vocal Jazz	Sunset in the Blue	Nominated
2020	Jazz Awards	Best International Vocal Album	Sunset in the Blue	Won
2021	Académie Charles Cros	Grand Prix du Disque	Sunset in the Blue	Won
2022	French Jazz Academy	Best International Vocal Album	Sunset in the Blue	Nominated
2025	Jazz FM Awards	Golden		Won

== Discography ==
=== Studio albums ===
List of studio albums, with selected chart positions, sales figures and certifications
Title	Details	Peak chart positions										Sales	Certifications
Title	Details	US	AUS	AUT	FRA	GER	JPN	NLD	NOR	SWE	UK	Sales	Certifications
Worrisome Heart	Released: February 26, 2008; Label: Verve; Formats: CD, LP, digital download	80	93	—	8	44	86	—	31	25	172	US: 100,000	BPI: Silver; BVMI: Gold; SNEP: Gold
My One and Only Thrill	Released: April 28, 2009; Label: Verve, Universal Classics and Jazz; Formats: CD, LP, digital download	42	23	44	4	4	27	20	2	1	12	US: 117,000; FRA: 270,000; UK: 100,000	ARIA: Gold; BPI: Gold; BVMI: Platinum; GLF: 2× Platinum; IFPI NOR: Platinum; SNEP: 2× Platinum
The Absence	Released: May 28, 2012; Label: Decca; Formats: CD, LP, digital download	33	43	10	3	9	22	15	1	3	18	US: 51,000	SNEP: Platinum
Currency of Man	Released: June 2, 2015; Label: Decca; Formats: CD, LP, digital download	124	80	16	5	11	59	12	14	—	31		
Sunset in the Blue	Released: October 23, 2020; Label: Decca; Formats: CD, LP, digital download	— (Note: Sunset in the Blue did not enter the Billboard 200, but peaked at number 70 on the Current Album Sales chart.)	—	13	18	27	88	—	—	—	40		
Entre eux deux (with Philippe Powell)	Released: May 20, 2022; Label: Decca; Formats: CD, LP, digital download	—	—	66	17	22	—	17	—	—	—		
"—" denotes a recording that did not chart or was not released in that territory.

=== Live albums ===
List of live albums, with selected chart positions
Title	Details	Peak chart positions						
Title	Details	US Current	US Jazz	AUT	FRA	GER	JPN	NLD
Live in Europe	Released: February 9, 2018; Label: Decca; Formats: CD, LP	97	2	14	16	14	162	152

=== Compilation albums ===
List of compilation albums, with selected chart positions
Title	Details	Peak chart positions		
Title	Details	BEL (FL)	BEL (WA)	FRA
The Essential Melody Gardot	Released: October 25, 2024; Label: Decca; Formats: 2×CD, 2×LP, digital download	171	137	44

=== Extended plays ===
List of extended plays, with selected chart positions
Title	Details	Peak chart positions
Title	Details	US Jazz
Some Lessons: The Bedroom Sessions	Released: May 3, 2005; Label: Self-released; Format: CD	—
Live from SoHo	Released: March 24, 2009; Label: Verve; Format: Digital download	2
Bye Bye Blackbird	Released: 2010; Label: Verve; Formats: CD, digital download	—
A Night with Melody EP	Released: April 6, 2011; Label: Decca; Format: CD	—
"—" denotes a recording that did not chart or was not released in that territory.

=== Singles ===
- "Worrisome Heart" (2008)
- "Goodnite" (2008)
- "Quiet Fire" (2008)
- "Who Will Comfort Me" (2009)
- "Baby I'm a Fool" (2009)
- "If the Stars Were Mine" (2009)
- "Your Heart Is as Black as Night" (2011)
- "Mira" (2012)
- "Amalia" (2012)
- "La Vie en Rose" (2012)
- "Same to You" (2015)
- "Preacherman" (2015)
- "It Gonna Come" (2016)
- "From Paris with Love" (2020)
- "Little Something" (featuring Sting) (2020)
- "Sunset in the Blue" (2020)
- "C'est Magnifique" (featuring Antonio Zambujo) (2020)

== Collaborations ==
Gardot appears on the following songs, on vocals and occasionally piano or guitar, by other artists:

- Beaucoup Blue – "Bluer Than a Midnight Sky" on Free to Fall
- Till Brönner – "High Night (Alta Noite)" on Rio (2008)
- Charlie Haden Quartet West – "If I'm Lucky" on Sophisticated Ladies (2010)
- Seth Kallen & The Reaction – "My Sweet Darling" on Exhibit A
- Phil Roy – "A Meditation on War and the Fight for Love" on The Great Longing
- Eddy Mitchell – "Derrière L'arc-En-Ciel / Over the Rainbow" on Grand Ecran
- Juliette Gréco – "Sous Les Ponts de Paris (Under the Bridges of Paris)" on Ça Se Traverse et C'est Beau (Feb 2012)
- Jesse Harris – "Tant Pis" on Sub Rosa (July 2012)
- Baptiste Trotignon – "Mon Fantôme" on Song Song Song (Sep 2012)
- Lizanne Knott – "There Are Angels" on Marionette (Sep 2012, UK release)
- Federico Aubele – "Somewhere Else" on 5 (2013)
- Pierre Aderne – "Limoeiro" and "Melodia e Letra" on Caboclo (2014)
- Vinicius Cantuária – "Insensatez" on Vinicius Canta Antonio Carlos Jobim (2015)
- "He's a Tramp" and "The Bare Necessities" on Jazz Loves Disney (2016)
- "C'est Trop Tard" on Elles & Barbara (2017)
- "The King of 52nd Street" on The Passion of Charlie Parker (2017)
- "La Chanson Des Vieux Amants" on Brel – Ces Gens-Lá (2019)
- "La Javanaise" on Les Pianos de Gainsbourg by André Manoukian (2021)
- "Waiting", "Rio Negro", "How Long", and "Surpresa" on Surpresa by Jesse Harris & Vincicius Cantuaria (2021)
- "Misty" on Night Blooms by Jeff Goldblum (2026)
