= Minoan pottery =

Pottery from Bronze Age Crete

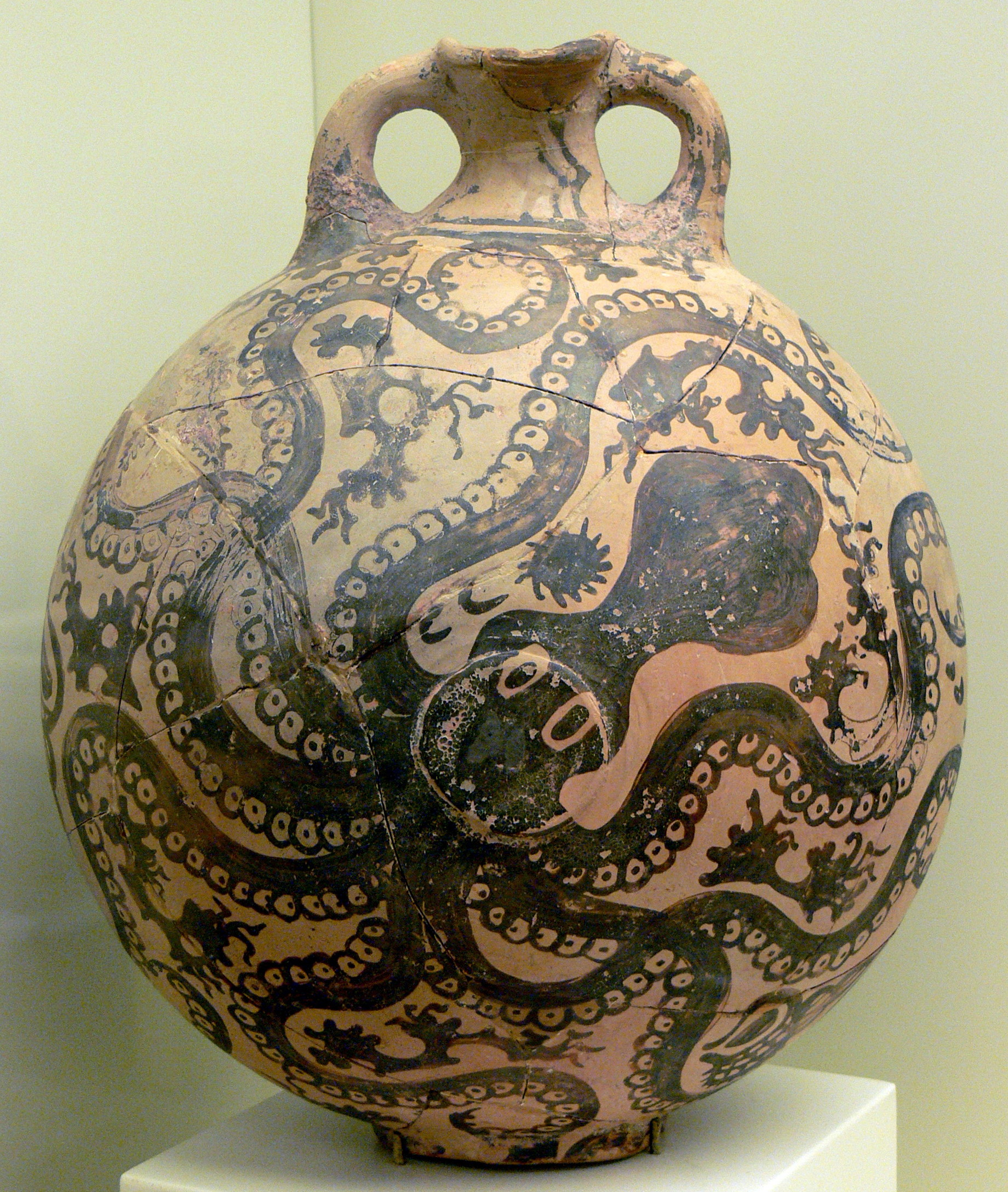
"Marine Style" flask with octopus, c. 1500-1450 BC

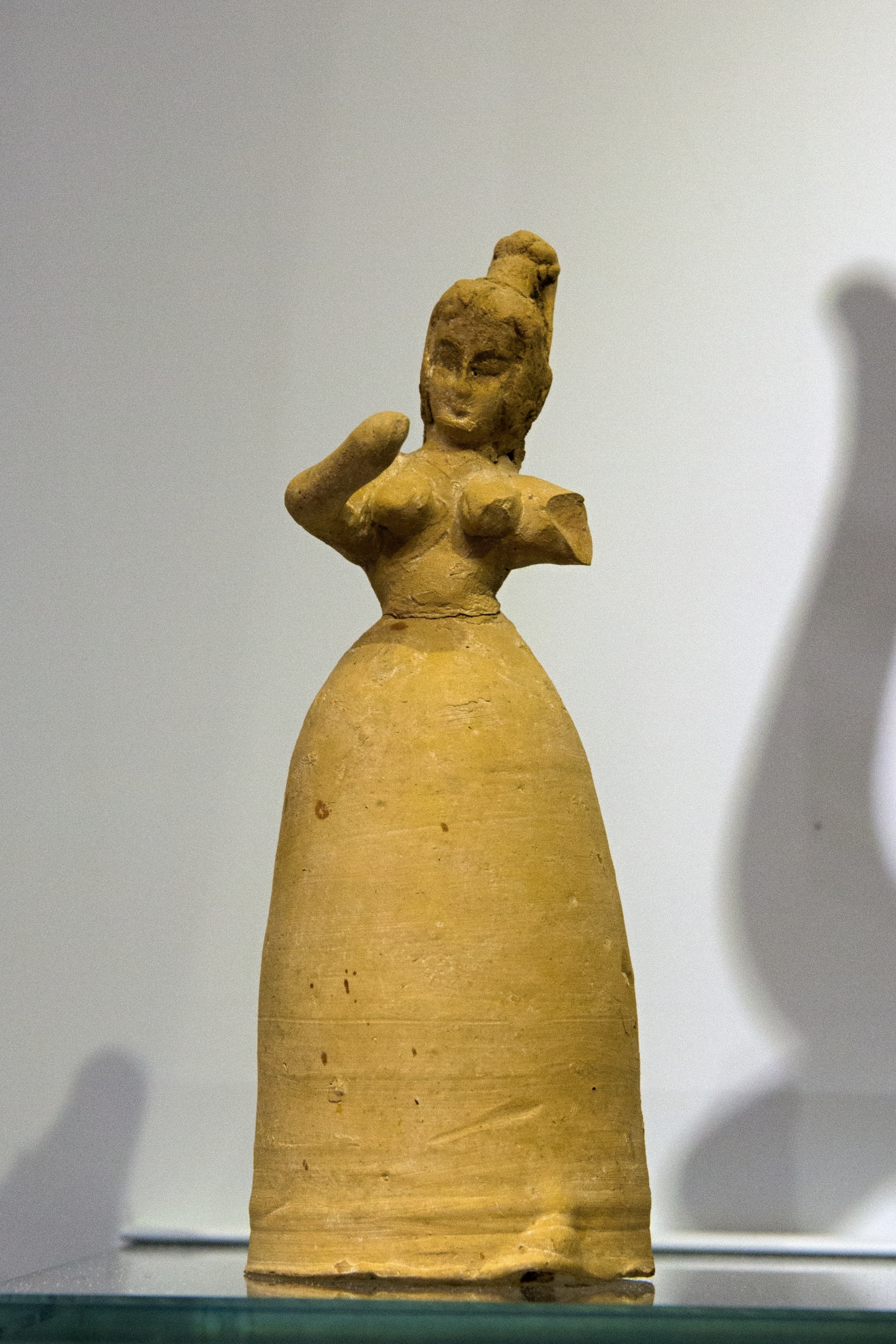
Figurine of female worshipper, Phaistos, 1700-1600 BC displayed in the Heraklion Archaeological Museum

The Minoan civilization produced a wide variety of richly decorated Minoan pottery. Its sequence of maturing artistic styles reveals something of Minoan patrons' pleasure in novelty while they assist archaeologists in assigning relative dates to the strata of their sites. Pots that contained oils and ointments, exported from 18th century BC Crete, have been found at sites through the Aegean islands and mainland Greece, in Cyprus, along coastal Syria and in Egypt, showing the wide trading contacts of the Minoans.

The pottery includes vases, figurines, models of buildings, and burial urns called larnakes. Several pottery shapes, especially the rhyton cup, were also produced in soft stones such as steatite, but there was almost no overlap with metal vessels. The finest achievements came in the Middle Minoan period, with the palace pottery called Kamares ware, and the Late Minoan all-over patterned "Marine Style" and "Floral Style". These were widely exported around the Aegean civilizations and sometimes beyond, and are the high points of the Minoan pottery tradition.

The most comprehensive collection is in the Heraklion Archaeological Museum on Crete.

== Traditional chronology ==
Minoan chronology
3500–2900 BC	EMI	Prepalatial
2900–2300 BC	EMII	Prepalatial
2300–2100 BC	EMIII	Prepalatial
2100–1900 BC	MMIA	Prepalatial
1900–1800 BC	MMIB	Protopalatial (Old Palace Period)
1800–1750 BC	MMIIA	Protopalatial (Old Palace Period)
1750-1700 BC	MMIIB	Neopalatial (New Palace Period)
1700–1650 BC	MMIIIA	Neopalatial (New Palace Period)
1650–1600 BC	MMIIIB	Neopalatial (New Palace Period)
1600–1500 BC	LMIA	Neopalatial (New Palace Period)
1500–1450 BC	LMIB	Postpalatial (at Knossos; Final Palace Period)
1450–1400 BC	LMII	Postpalatial (at Knossos; Final Palace Period)
1400–1350 BC	LMIIIA	Postpalatial (at Knossos; Final Palace Period)
1350–1100 BC	LMIIIB	Postpalatial (at Knossos; Final Palace Period)

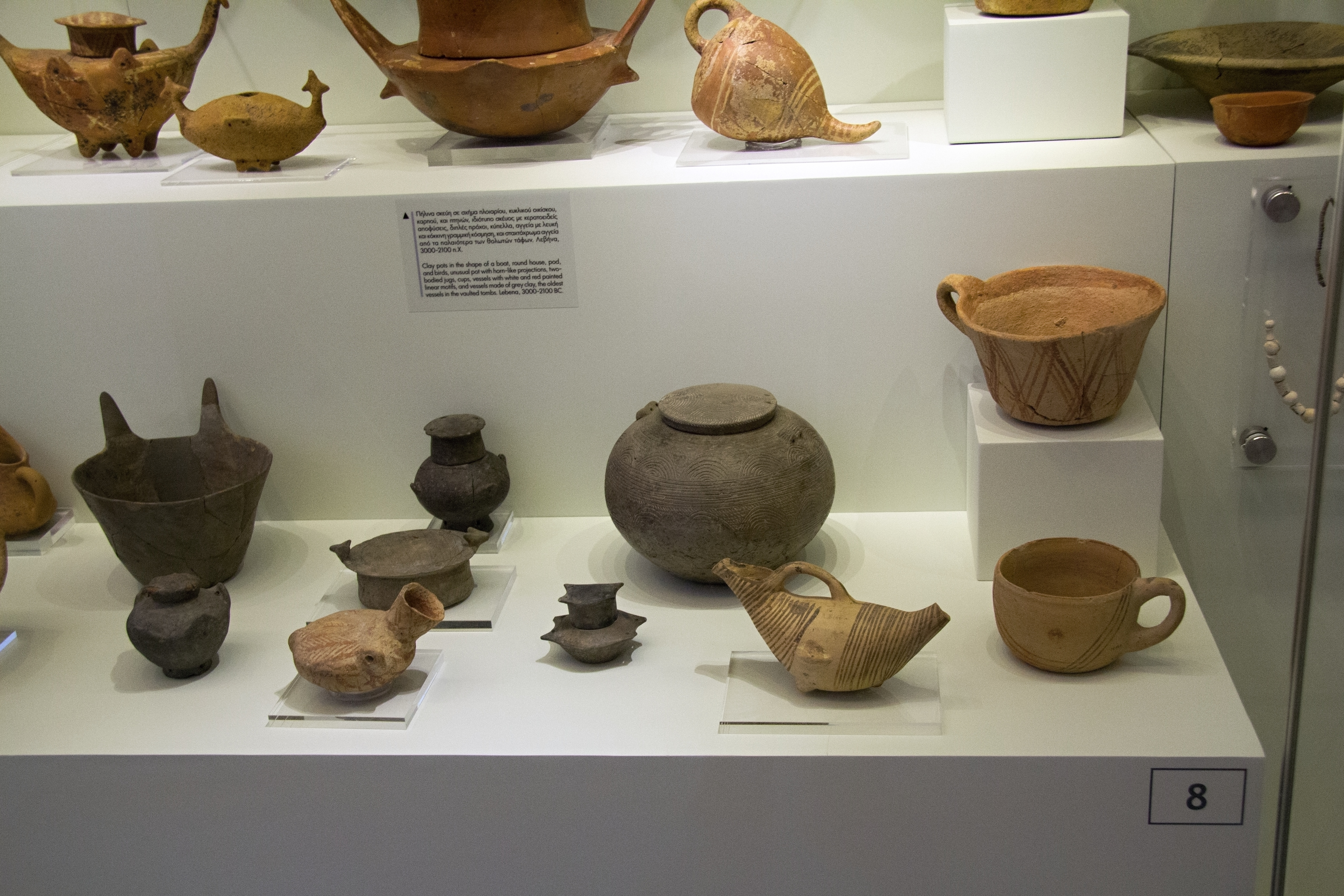
Pottery from Lebena, Crete, 3000-2100 BC, AMH

The traditional chronology for dating Minoan civilization was developed by Sir Arthur Evans in the early years of the 20th century AD. His terminology and the one proposed by Nikolaos Platon are still generally in use and appear in this article. For more details, see the Minoan chronology.

Evans classified fine pottery by the changes in its forms and styles of decoration. Platon concentrated on the episodic history of the Palace of Knossos. A new method, fabric analysis, involves geologic analysis of coarse and mainly non-decorated sherds as though they were rocks. The resulting classifications are based on composition of the sherds.

== Production and techniques ==
Little is known about the way the pottery was produced, but it was probably in small artisanal workshops, often clustered in settlements near good sources of clay for potting. For many, potting may well have been a seasonal activity, combined with farming, although the volume and sophistication of later wares suggests full-time specialists, and two classes of workshop, one catering to the palaces. There is some evidence that women were also potters. Archaeologists seeking to understand the conditions of production have drawn tentative comparisons with aspects of both modern Cretan rural artisans and the better-documented Egyptian and Mesopotamian Bronze Age industries. In Linear B the word for potter is "ke-ra-me-u".

Technically, slips were widely used, with a variety of effects well understood. The potter's wheel appears to have been available from the MM IB, but other "handmade" methods of forming the body remained in use, and were needed for objects with sculptural shapes. Ceramic glazes were not used, and none of the wares were fired to very high temperatures, remaining earthenware or terracotta. All of these characteristics remain true of later Greek pottery throughout its great period. The finest wares often have very thin-walled bodies. The excavation of an abandoned LM kiln at Kommos (the port of Phaistos), complete with its "wasters" (malformed pots), is developing understanding of the details of production. The styles of pottery show considerable regional variation within Crete in many periods.

== Early Minoan ==
Early Minoan pottery is broadly characterized by a large number of local wares with frequent Cycladic parallels or imports, suggesting a population of checkerboard ethnicity deriving from various locations in the eastern Aegean and beyond.

=== FN, EM I ===
Early Minoan pottery, to some extent, continued, and possibly evolved from, the local Final Neolithic (FN) without a severe break. Many suggest that Minoan civilization evolved in-situ and was not imported from the East. Its other main feature is its variety from site to site, which is suggestive of localism of Early Minoan social traditions.

Studies of the relationship between EM I and FN have been conducted mainly in East Crete. There the Final Neolithic has affinities to the Cyclades, while both FN and EM I settlements are contemporaneous, with EM I gradually replacing FN. Of the three possibilities, no immigration, total replacement of natives by immigrants, immigrants settling among natives, Hutchinson takes a compromise view:

"The Neolithic Period in Crete did not end in a catastrophe; its culture developed into that of the Bronze Age under pressure from infiltration of relatively small bands of immigrants from the south and east, where copper and bronze had long been in use."

=== Pyrgos Ware ===
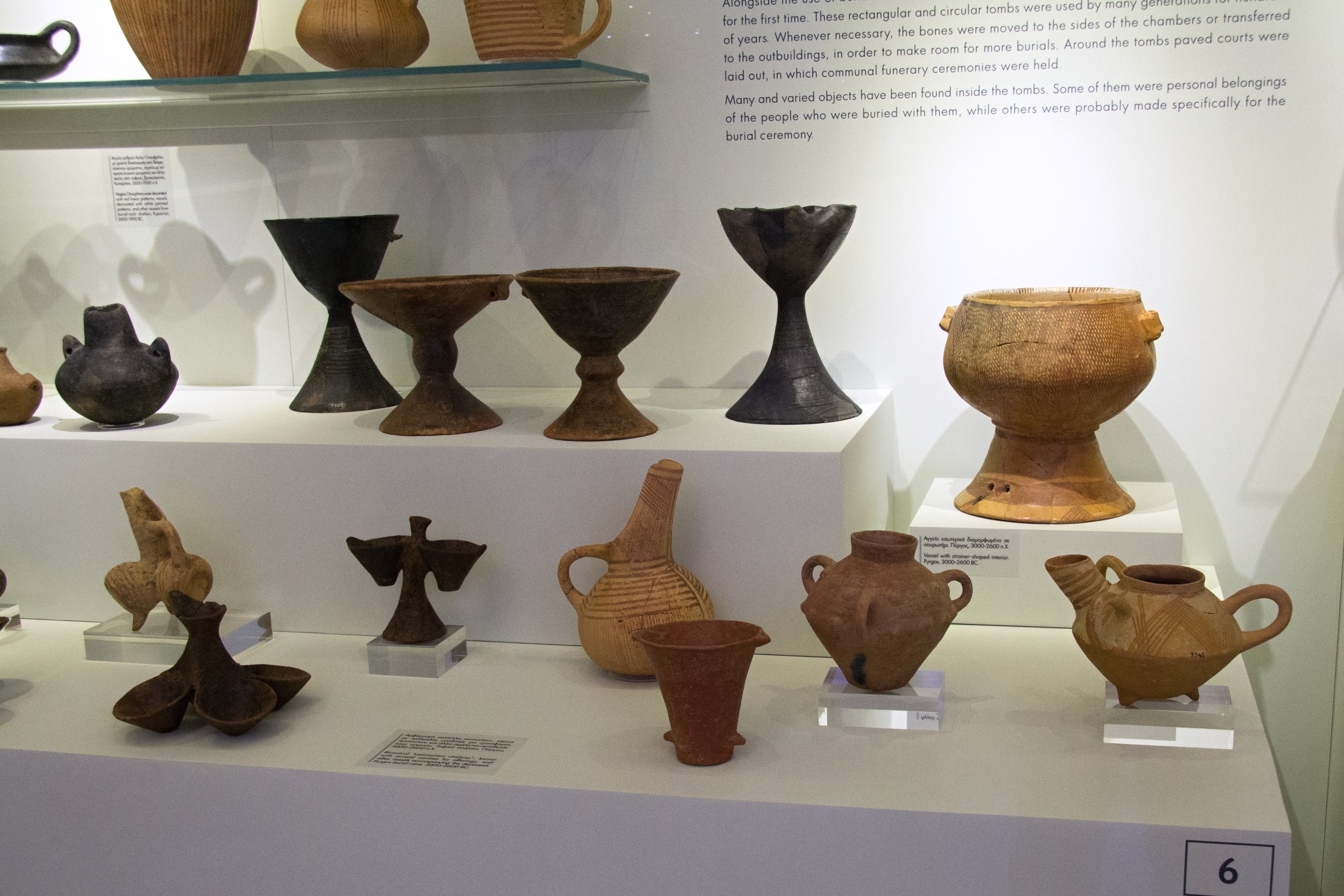
Early Minoan pottery from Pyrgos, 3000-2600 BC, Archaeological Museum of Heraklion (AMH)

EM I types include Pyrgos Ware, also called "Burnished Ware". The major form was the "chalice", or Arkalochori Chalice, in which a cup combined with a funnel-shaped stand could be set on a hard surface without spilling. As the Pyrgos site was a rock shelter used as an ossuary, some hypothesize ceremonial usage]. This type of pottery was black, grey or brown, and burnished, with some sort of incised linear pattern. It may have imitated wood.

=== Tripod Cooking Pots ===
The EM II era in the Minoan civilization saw the start of tripod cooking pots at places like Knossos, with that came a brief adoption of horned stands in cooking pot production, primarily used during the EM II period. These features have not been identified elsewhere beyond Knossos and surrounding regions. Cups had reduced in size for it to be used by one person. The vast majority of these Minoan tripod cooking pots had deep featured bodies, usually being supported with three legs with either horizontal handles or vertical handles with a small opening on the top. They appear to be the most common way to cook. These cooking tripods were made from red firing clay with rock fragments to create the coarse touch that these pots had. The usage of animal goods can be identified in the tripod cooking pots, and the usage of plant byproducts can also be identified. The mixture of both can be found in the tripod cooking pots, but with plant byproducts being more evident than animal byproducts in some instances. There appears to be also found residue of beeswax in the tripod cooking pots. Most of these discoveries were found at Sissi. What that beeswax was used for is uncertain. This appears to potentially lead to the possibility of subtypes of these cooking pots. There is evidence that these pots started to show up during the EMI in the Hagia Photia; its appearance in the Hagia Photia during the second EMII period is questionable. Most of these discoveries were located in the Northern and Northeastern sections of the island.

=== Incised Ware ===
Another EM I type, Incised Ware, also called Scored Ware, were hand-shaped, round-bottomed, dark-burnished jugs (Example) and bulbous cups and jars ("pyxes"). Favored decor was incised line patterns, vertical, horizontal or herring-bone. These pots are from the north and northeast of Crete and appear to be modeled after the Kampos Phase of the Grotta-Pelos early Cycladic I culture. Some have suggested imports or immigrations. See also Hagia Photia.

=== Agyios Onouphrios, Lebena ===
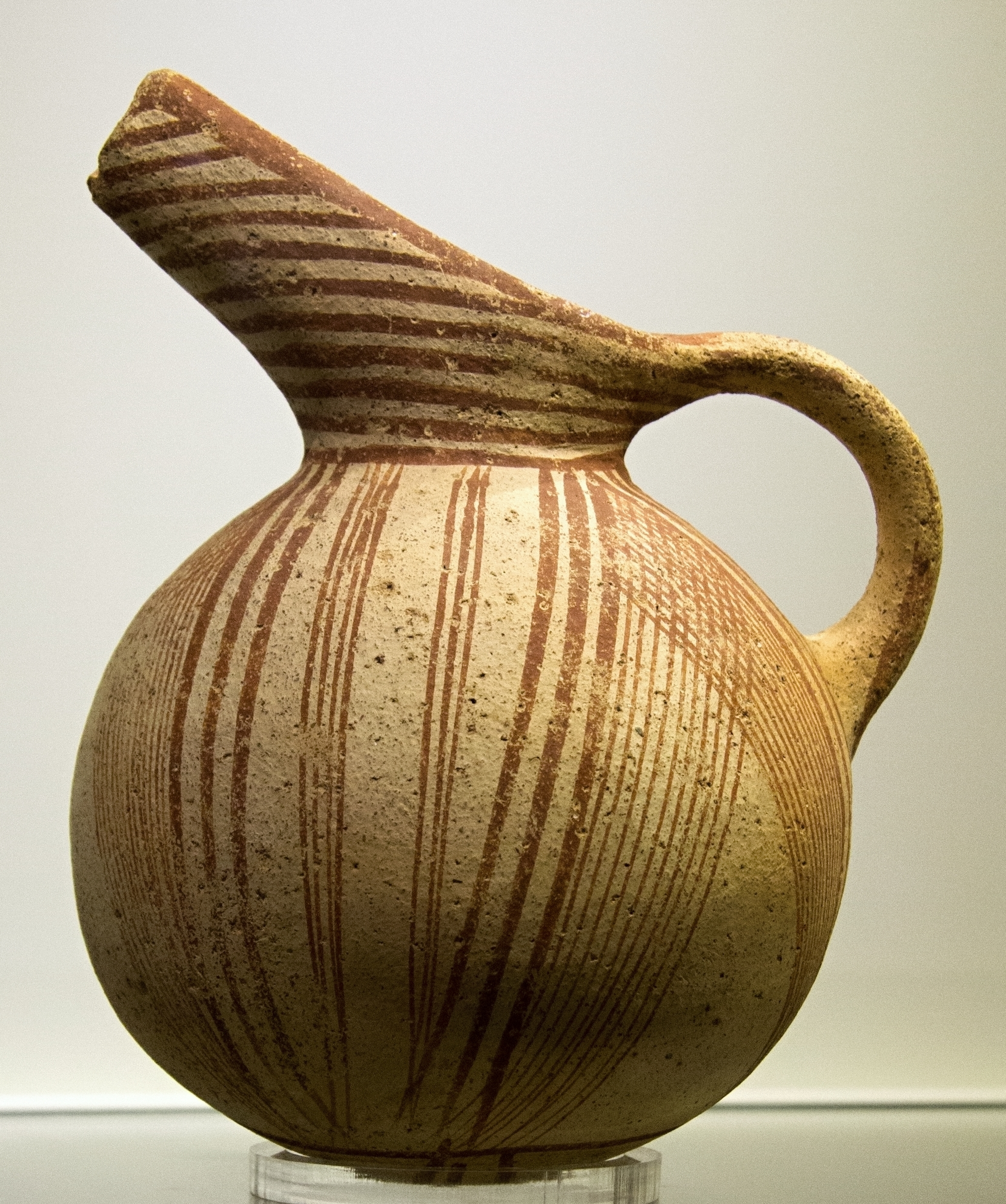
Agios Onouphrios ware with painted parallel-line decoration, 2600-1900 BC, AMH

The painted parallel-line decoration of Agios Onouphrios Ware was drawn with an iron-red clay slip that would fire red under oxidizing conditions in a clean kiln but under the reducing conditions of a smoky fire turn darker, without much control over color, which could range from red to brown. A dark-on-light painted pattern was then applied. From this beginning, Minoan potters already concentrated on the linear forms of designs, perfecting coherent designs and voids that would ideally suit the shape of the ware. Shapes were jugs, two-handled cups and bowls. The ware came from north and south central Crete, as did Lebena Ware of the same general types but decorated by painting white patterns over a solid red painted background (Example). The latter came from EM I tombs.

=== Koumasa and Fine Gray Ware ===
In EM IIA, the geometric slip-painted designs of Koumasa Ware seem to have developed from the wares of Aghios Onouphrios. The designs are in red or black on a light background. Forms are cups, bowls, jugs and teapots (Example: "Goddess of Myrtos"). Also from EM IIA are the cylindrical and spherical pyxides called Fine Gray Ware or just Gray Ware, featuring a polished surface with incised diagonals, dots, rings and semicircles.

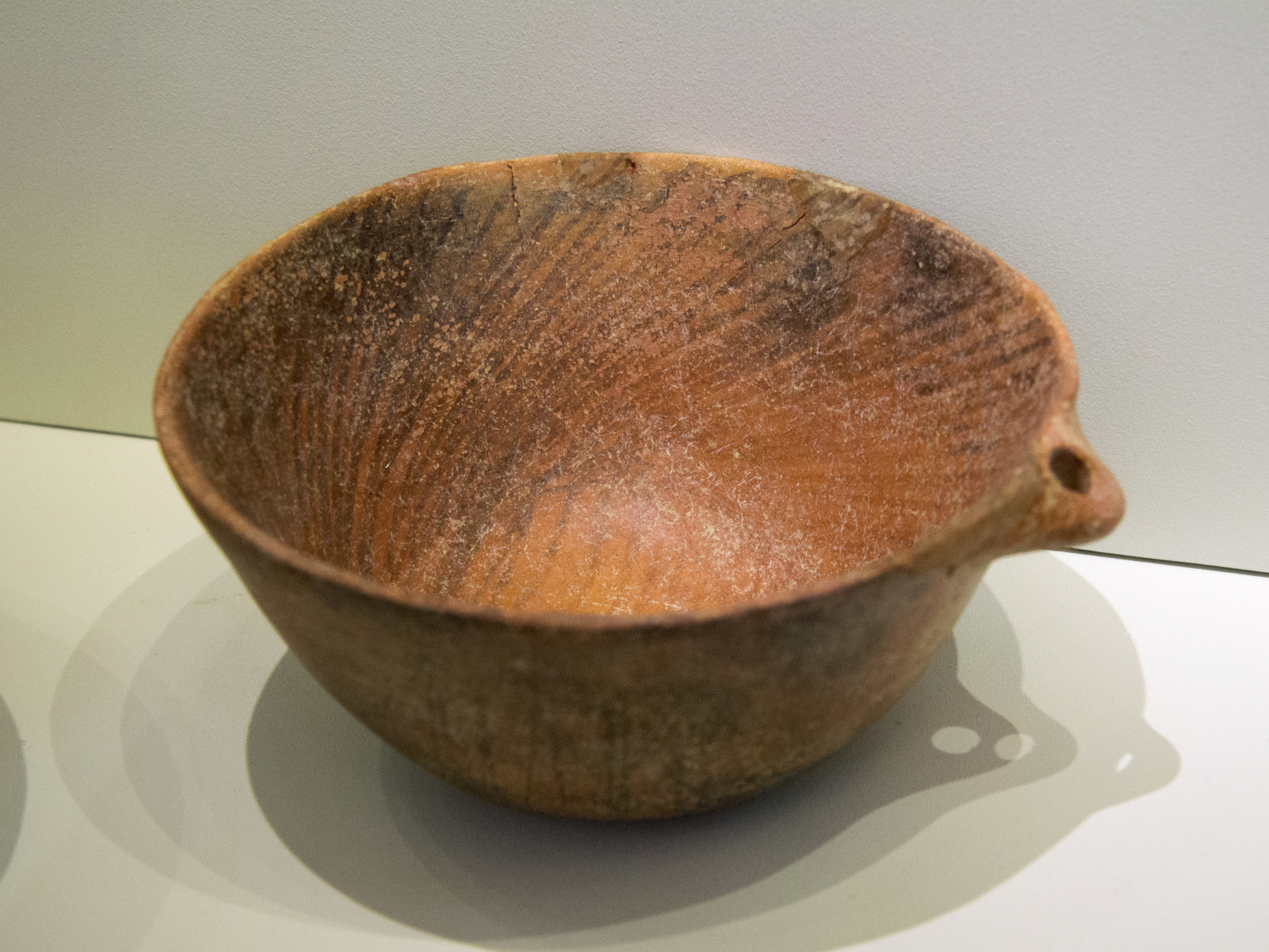
File:Early Minoan pottery, 3000-2600 BC

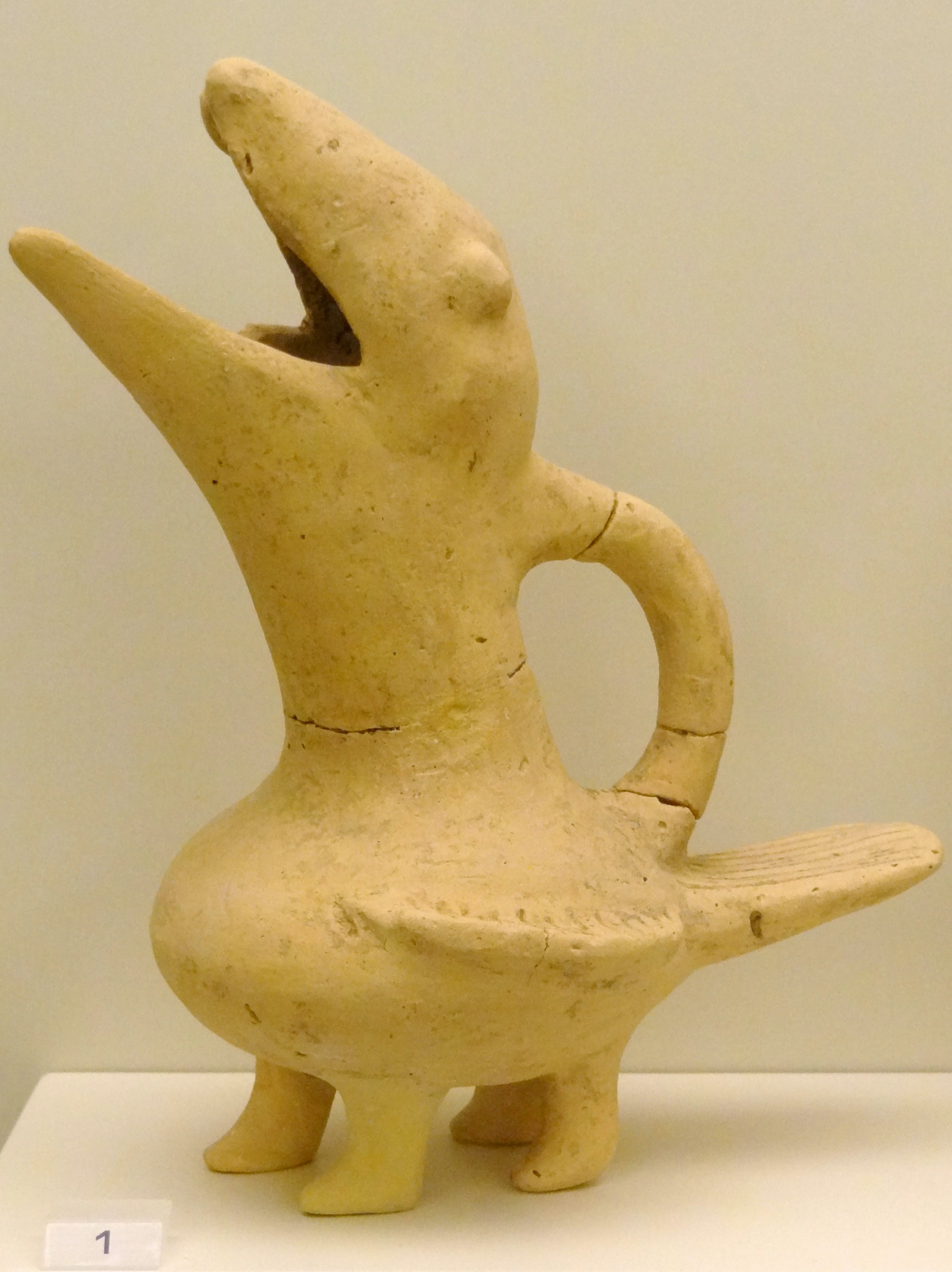
Bird shaped clay vessel from Koumasa, 2600–2300 BC, AMH.

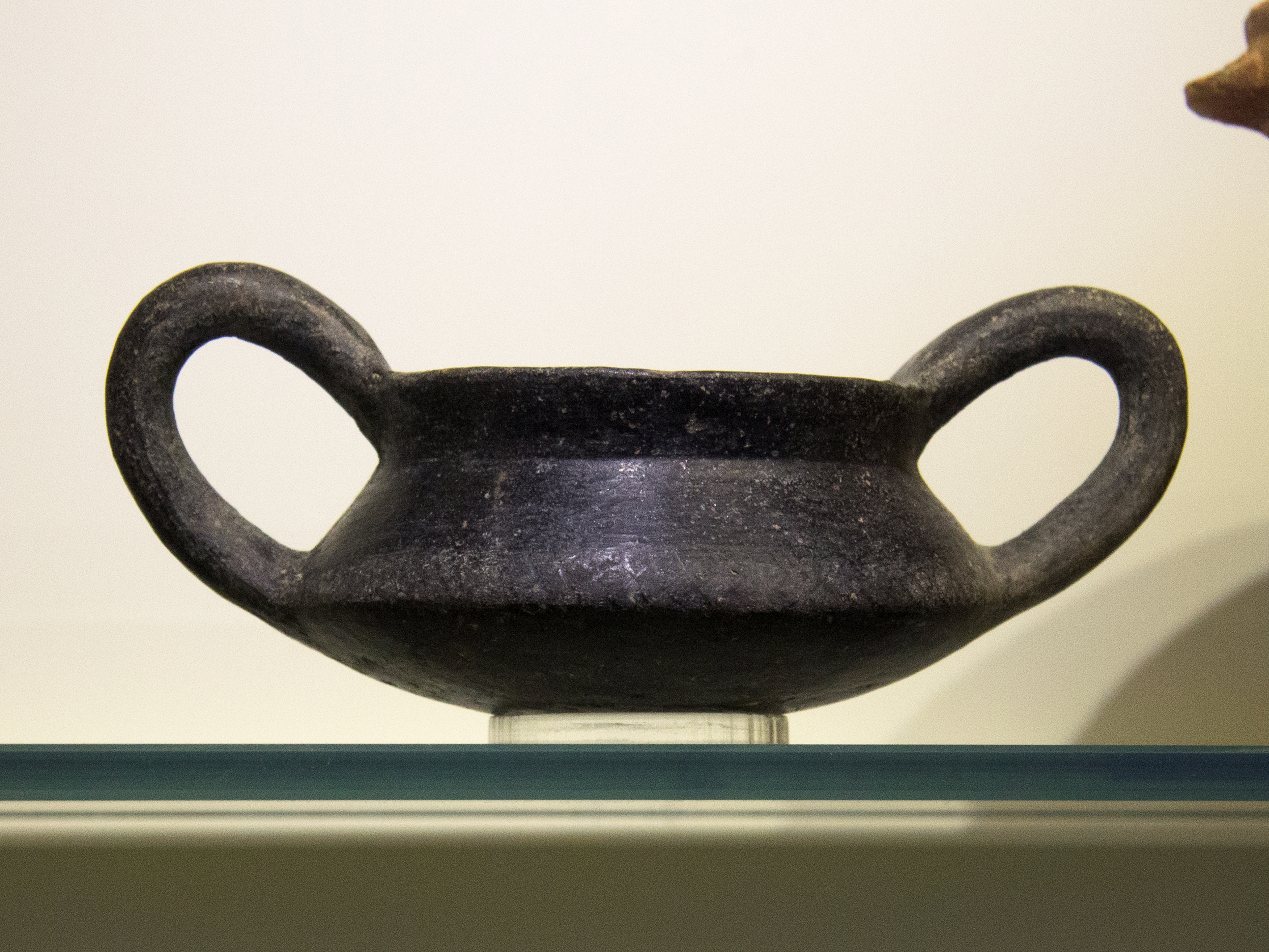
Burnished cup, Kyparissi, 2600-1900 BC, AMH

=== Vasiliki Ware ===
The EM IIA and IIB Vasiliki Ware, named for the Minoan site in eastern Crete, has mottled glaze effects, early experiments with controlling color, but the elongated spouts drawn from the body and ending in semicircular spouts show the beginnings of the tradition of Minoan elegance (Examples 1, Examples 2). The mottling was produced by uneven firing of the slip-covered pot, with the hottest areas turning dark. Considering that the mottling was controlled into a pattern, touching with hot coals was probably used to produce it. The effect was paralleled in cups made of mottled stone.

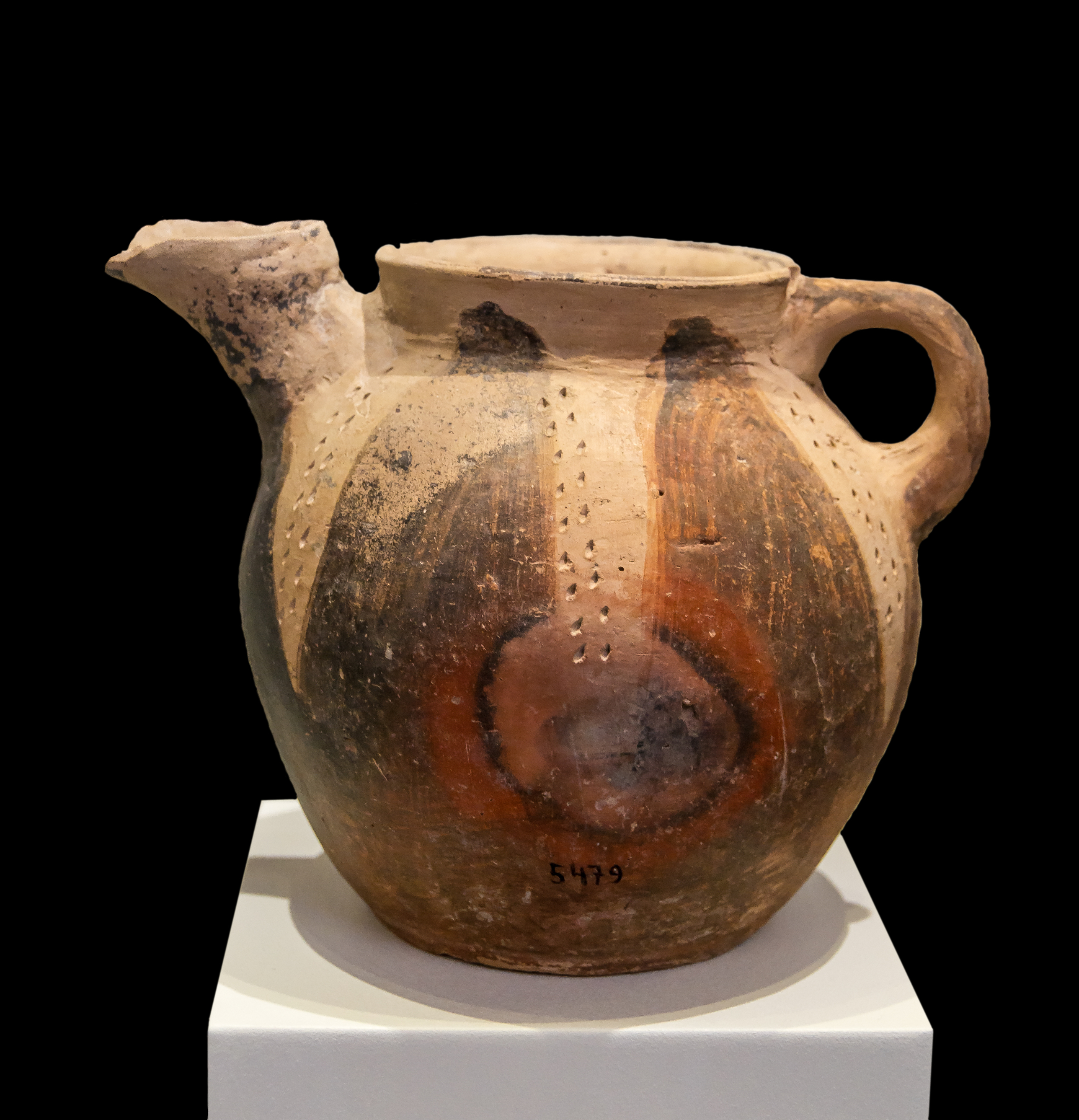
Another style of "teapot", Vasiliki, 2400 - 2200 BC, AMH

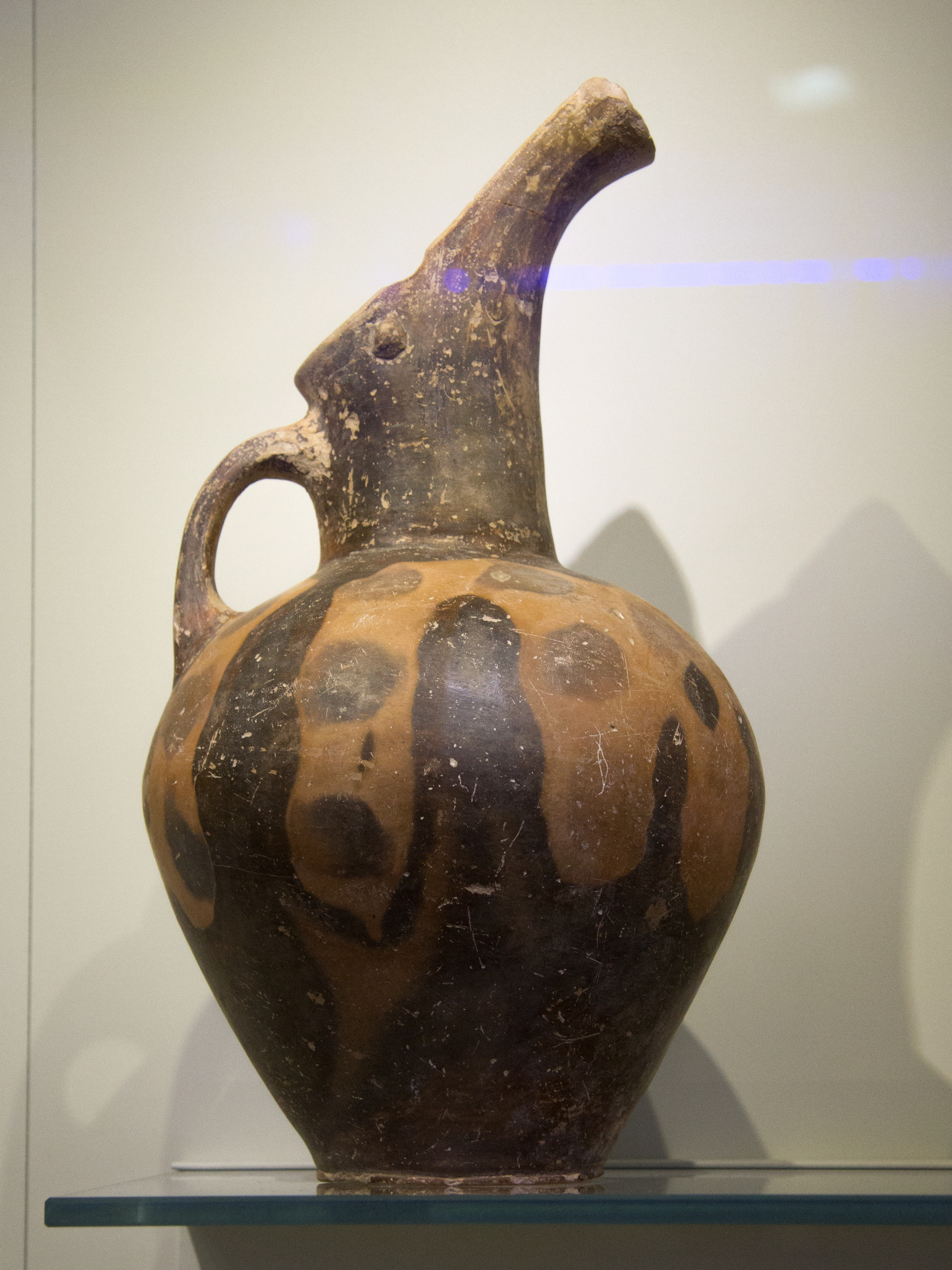
Vasiliki ware, jug, 2400-2200 BC

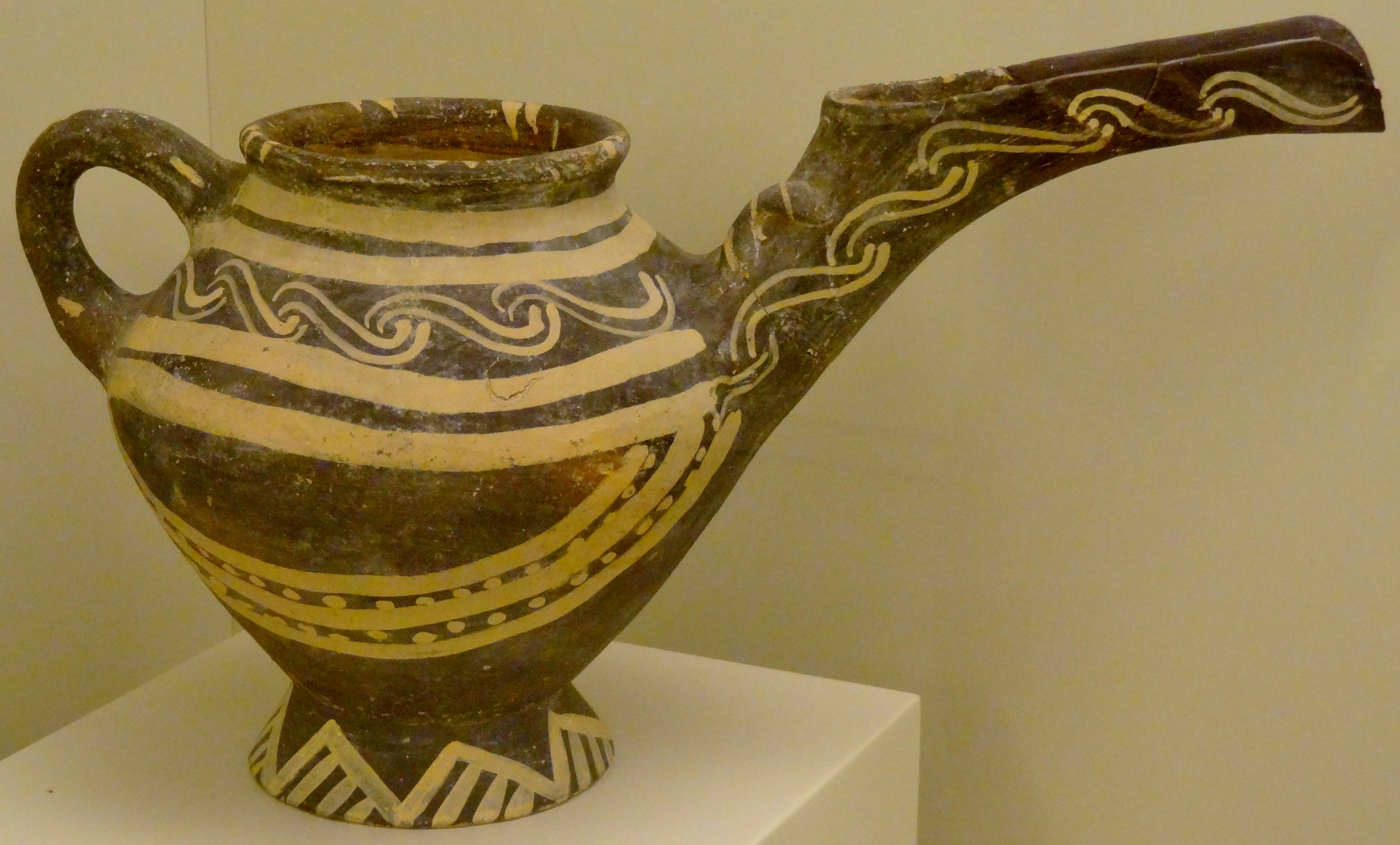
Teapot in the white style, 2300–2000 BC, AMH

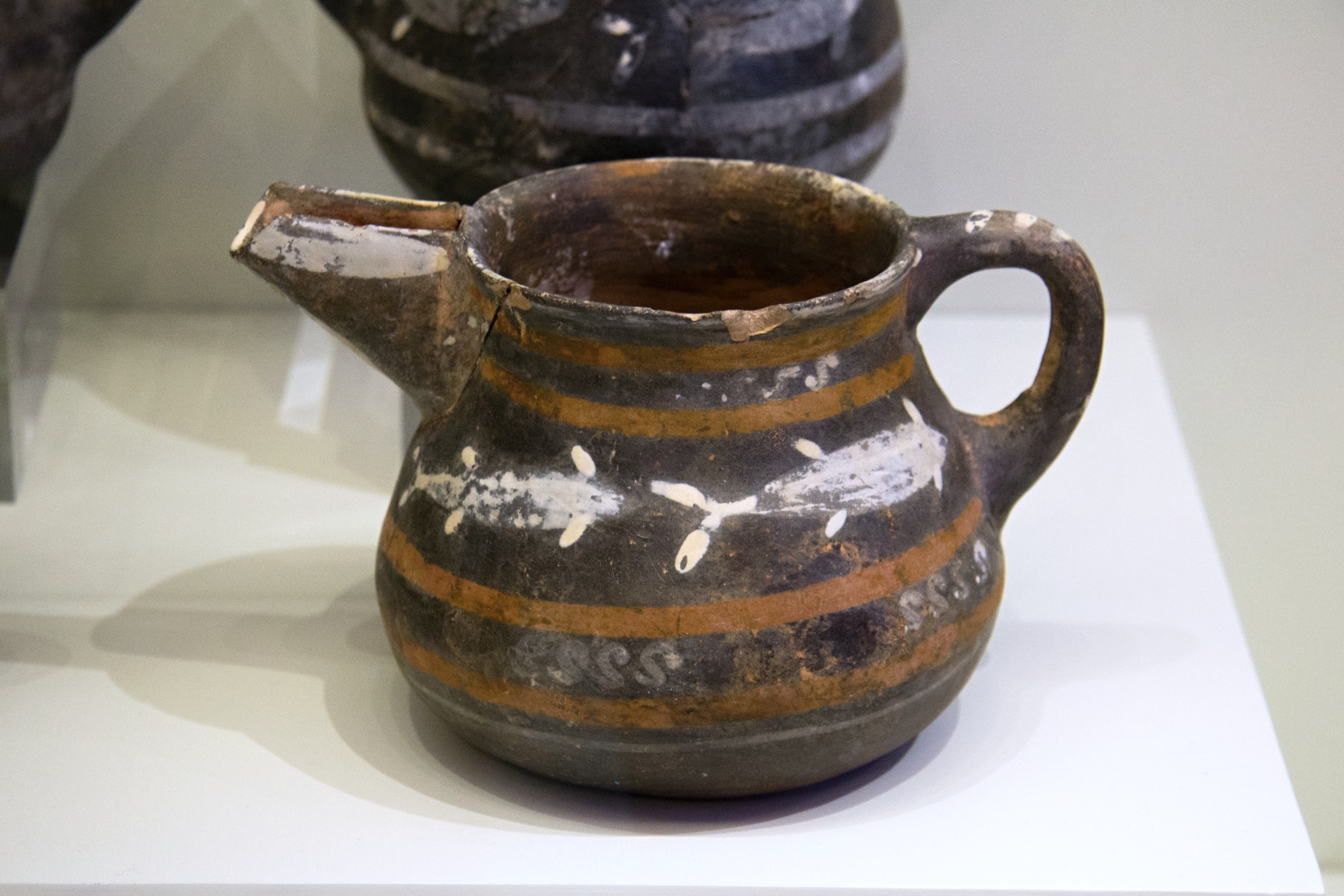
White style jug, 2300-1900 BC

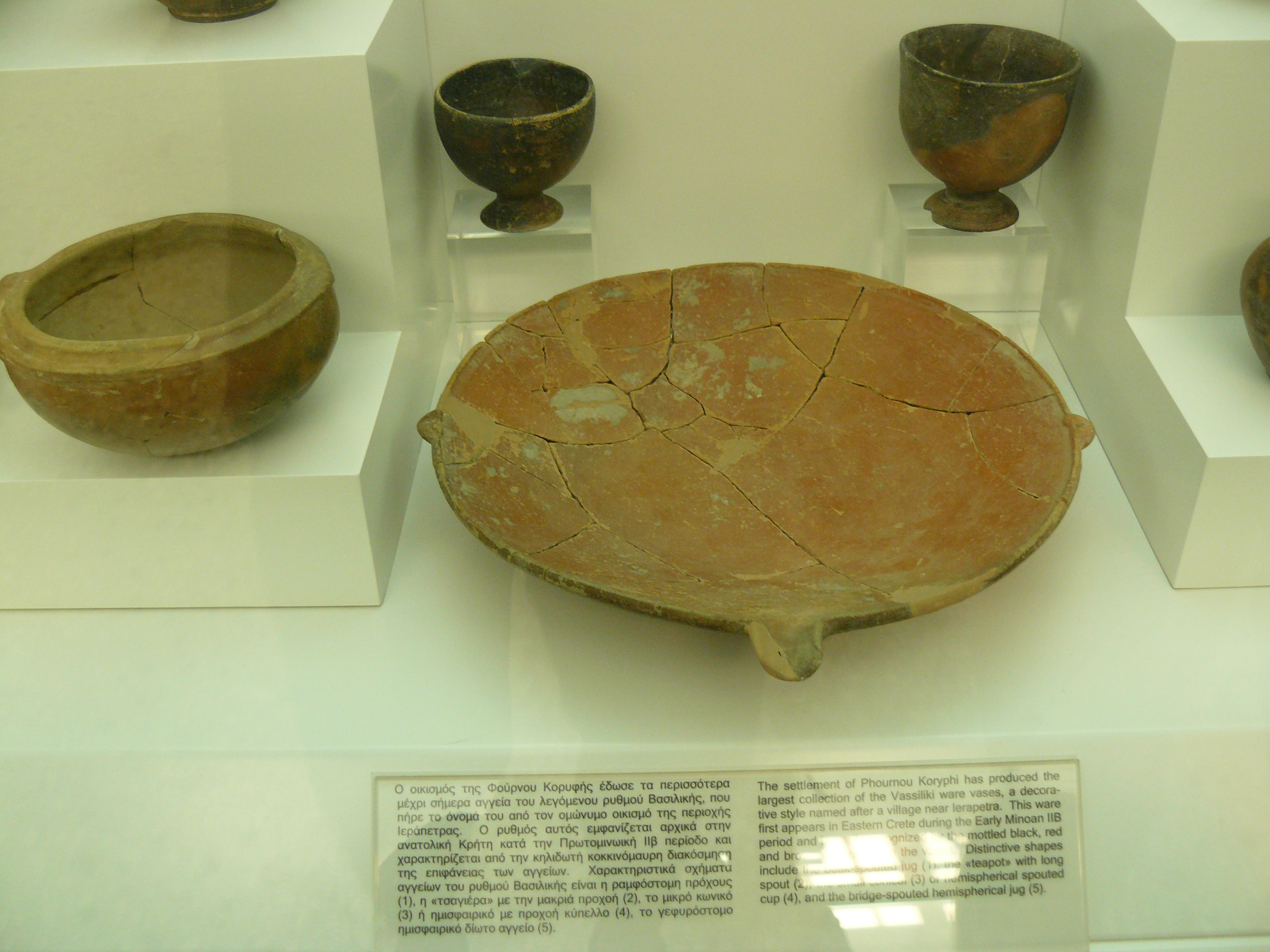
Other shapes; two "egg-cups" at rear

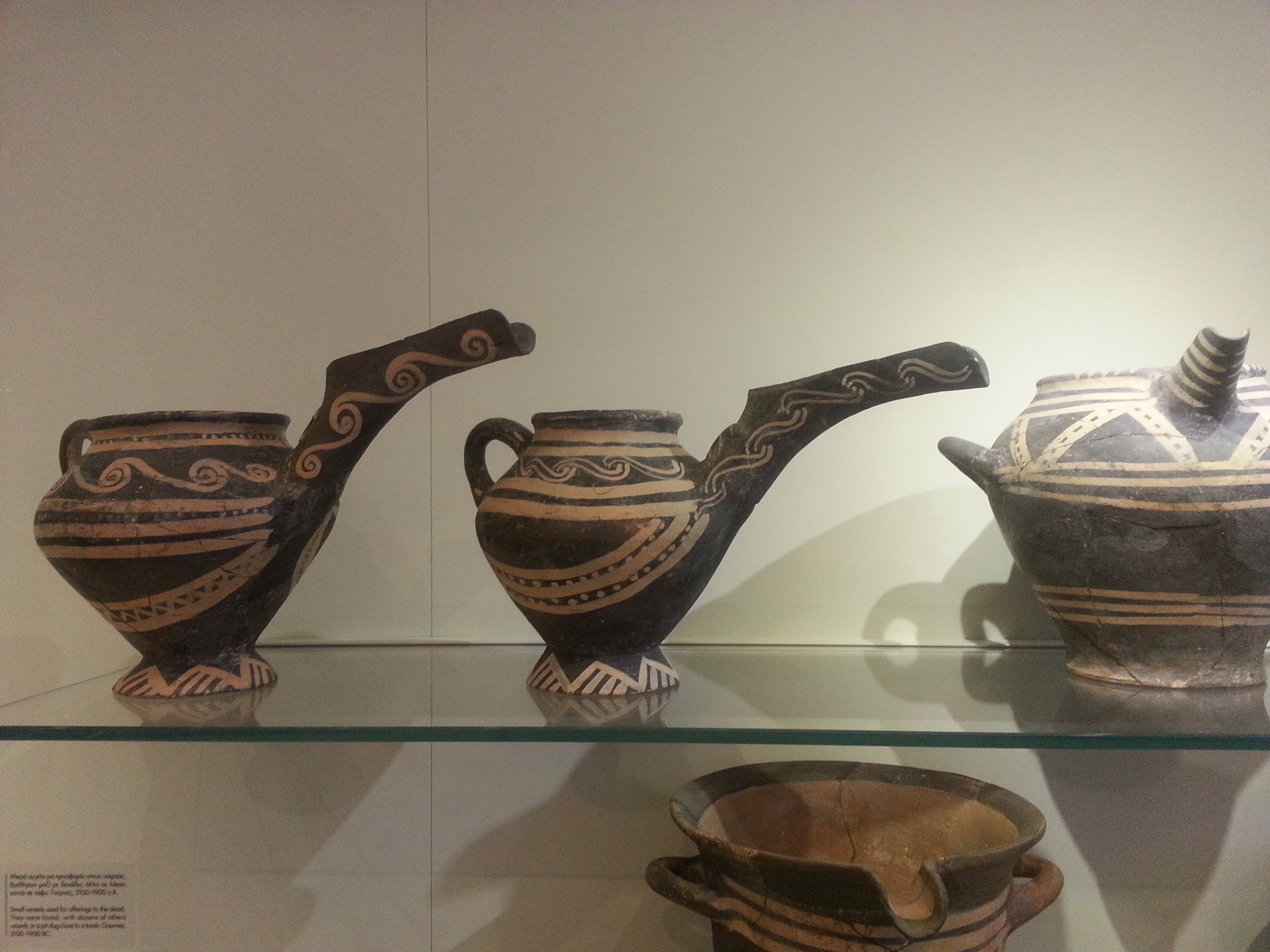
White style teapots, AMH

=== EM III Pottery ===
In the latest brief transition (EM III), wares in eastern Crete begin to be covered in dark slip with light slip-painted decor of lines and spirals; the first checkered motifs appear; the first petallike loops and leafy bands appear, at Gournia (Walberg 1986). Rosettes appear and spiral links sometimes joined into bands. These motifs are similar to those found on seals. In north central Crete, where Knossos was to emerge, there is little similarity: dark on light linear banding prevails; footed goblets make their appearance (Example).

== Middle Minoan ==
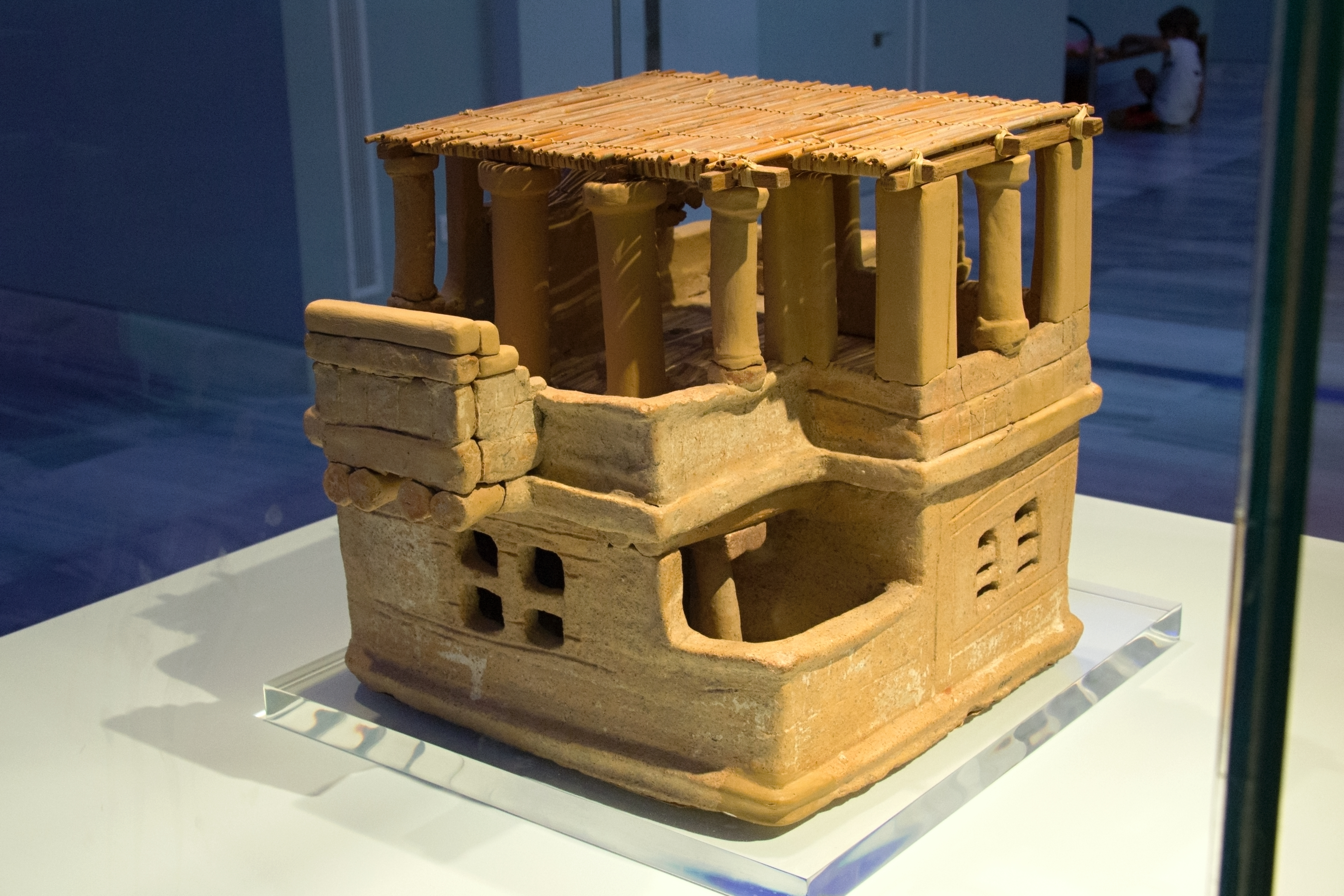
Clay house model from Archanes, 1700 BC, AMH

The rise of the Minoan palaces at Knossos and Phaistos and their new type of urbanized, centralized society with redistribution centers required more storage vessels and ones more specifically suited to a range of functions. In palace workshops, standardization suggests more supervised operations and the rise of elite wares, emphasizing refinements and novelty, so that palace and provincial pottery become differentiated.

The forms of the best wares were designed for table and service. In the palace workshops, the introduction from the Levant of the potter's wheel in MM IB enabled perfectly symmetrical bodies to be thrown from swiftly revolving clay. The well-controlled iron-red slip that was added to the color repertory during MM I could be achieved only in insulated closed kilns that were free of oxygen or smoke.

=== Pithoi ===
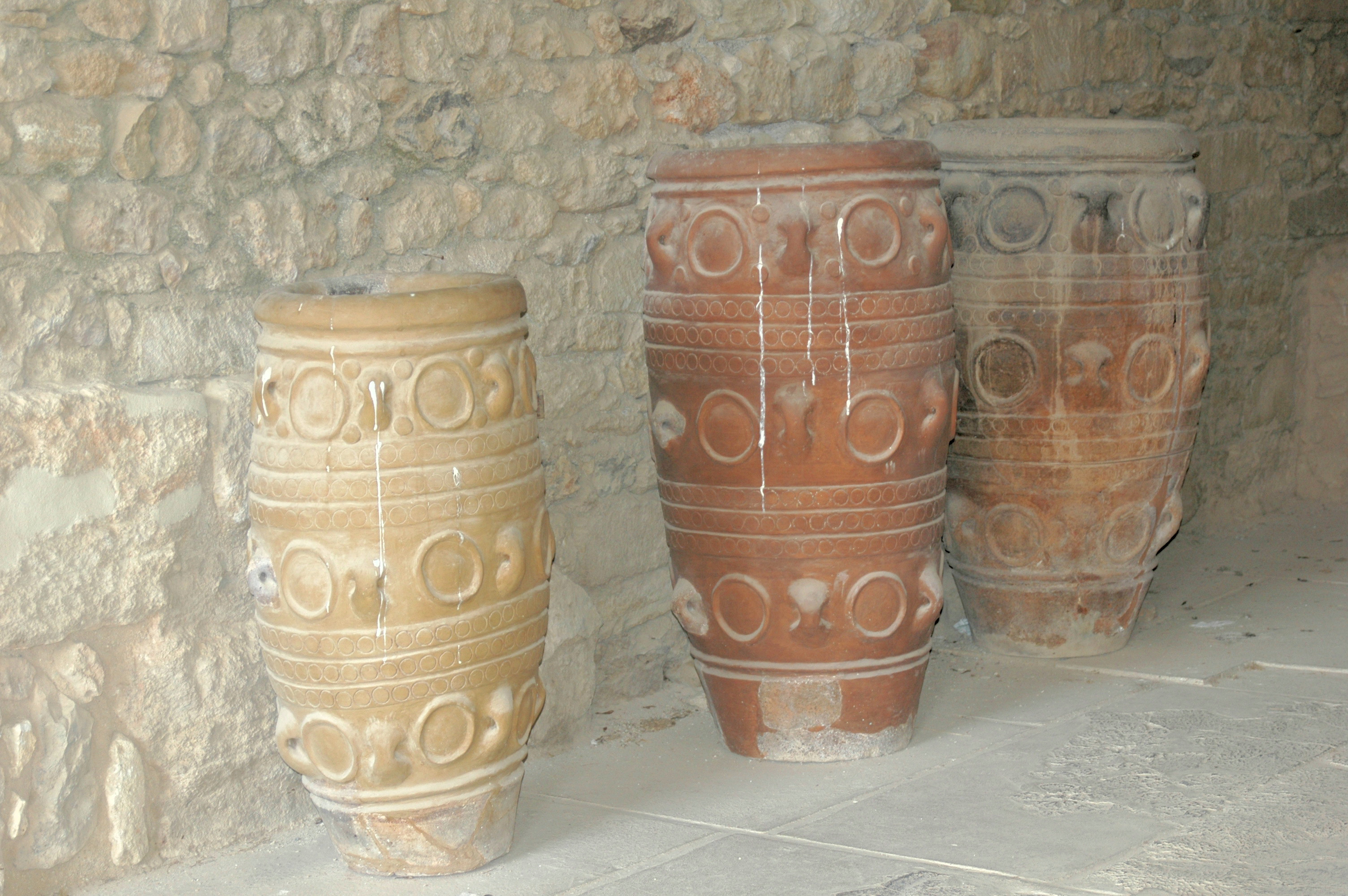
"Medallion Pithoi", or storage jars, at the Knossos palace. Named from the raised disks, they date to MM III/LM IA.

Any population center requires facilities in support of human needs and that is true of the palaces as well. Knossos had extensive sanitation, water supply and drainage systems, which is evidence that it was not a ceremonial labyrinth or large tomb. Liquid and granular necessities were stored in pithoi located in magazines, or storage rooms, and elsewhere. Pithoi make their earliest appearance just before MMI begins and continue into Late Minoan, becoming very rare by LMIII (Examples 1, Examples 2). About 400 pithoi were found at the palace of Knossos. An average pithos held about 1100 pounds of fluid. Perhaps because of the weight, pithoi were not stored on the upper floors.

=== New styles ===
New styles emerge at this time: an Incised Style (see above), and the tactile Barbotine ware, featuring the relief decoration studded with knobs and cones of applied clay in bands, waves and ridges. Such decorations are sometimes reminiscent of the marine-derived features such as the sand dollar tests, and barnacle growths (Example).

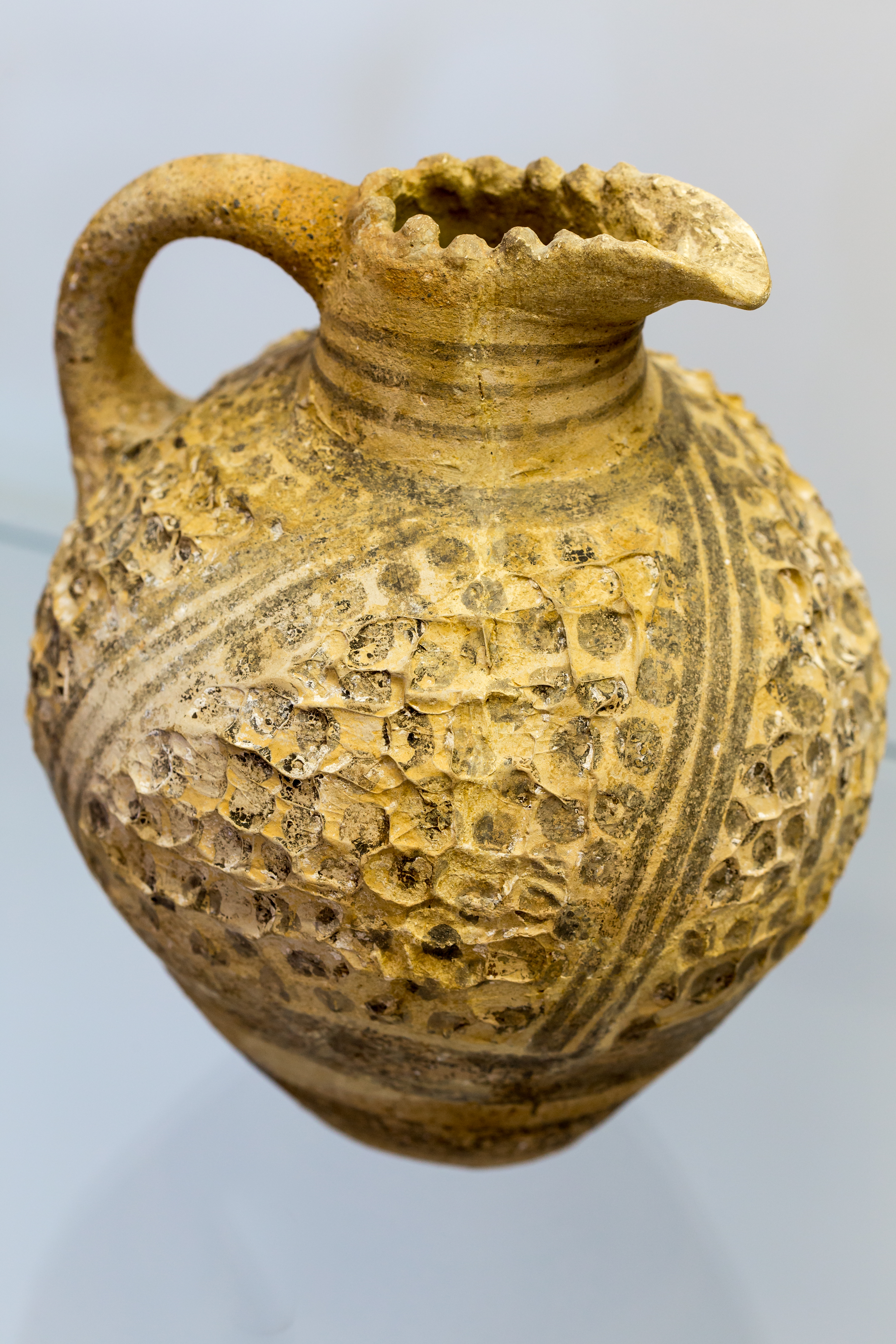
Early Minoan jug in barbotine style; surface treatment: barnacle work; dark painting on yellowish slip - Middle Minoan IB-IIA, earlier Protopalatial period - height: 19.2 cm; Kassel, Germany, Schloss Wilhelmshöhe Antiquities Collection

Barbotine ware features three-dimensional decorations, as well as the use of the ceramic slip. Ridges and protuberances of various types are seen on the surface of vessels.

The earliest stages of Kamares ware also appear at this time. Scholars place Barbotine ware a bit earlier than the Kamares ware,

"Barbotine Ware appears, in its earliest stages, a bit before MM IA, in EM III. The style gradually becomes more popular and picks up significantly in MM IA, along with the conservative incised style, dark on light style, and White on Dark Ware."

Gisela Walberg places Barbotine Ware, with its thin walls and dynamic motifs, in the Early Kamares Ware phase.

Spirals and whorls motifs appear in Minoan pottery from EM I onwards (Walberg), but they become especially popular during EM III. A new shape is the straight-sided cylindrical cup.

MMIA wares and local pottery imitating them are found at coastal sites in the eastern Peloponnese, though not more widely in the Aegean until MMIB; their influence on local pottery in the nearby Cyclades has been studied by Angelia G. Papagiannopoulou (1991). Shards of MM IIA pottery have been recovered in Egypt and at Ugarit.

=== Kamares Ware ===
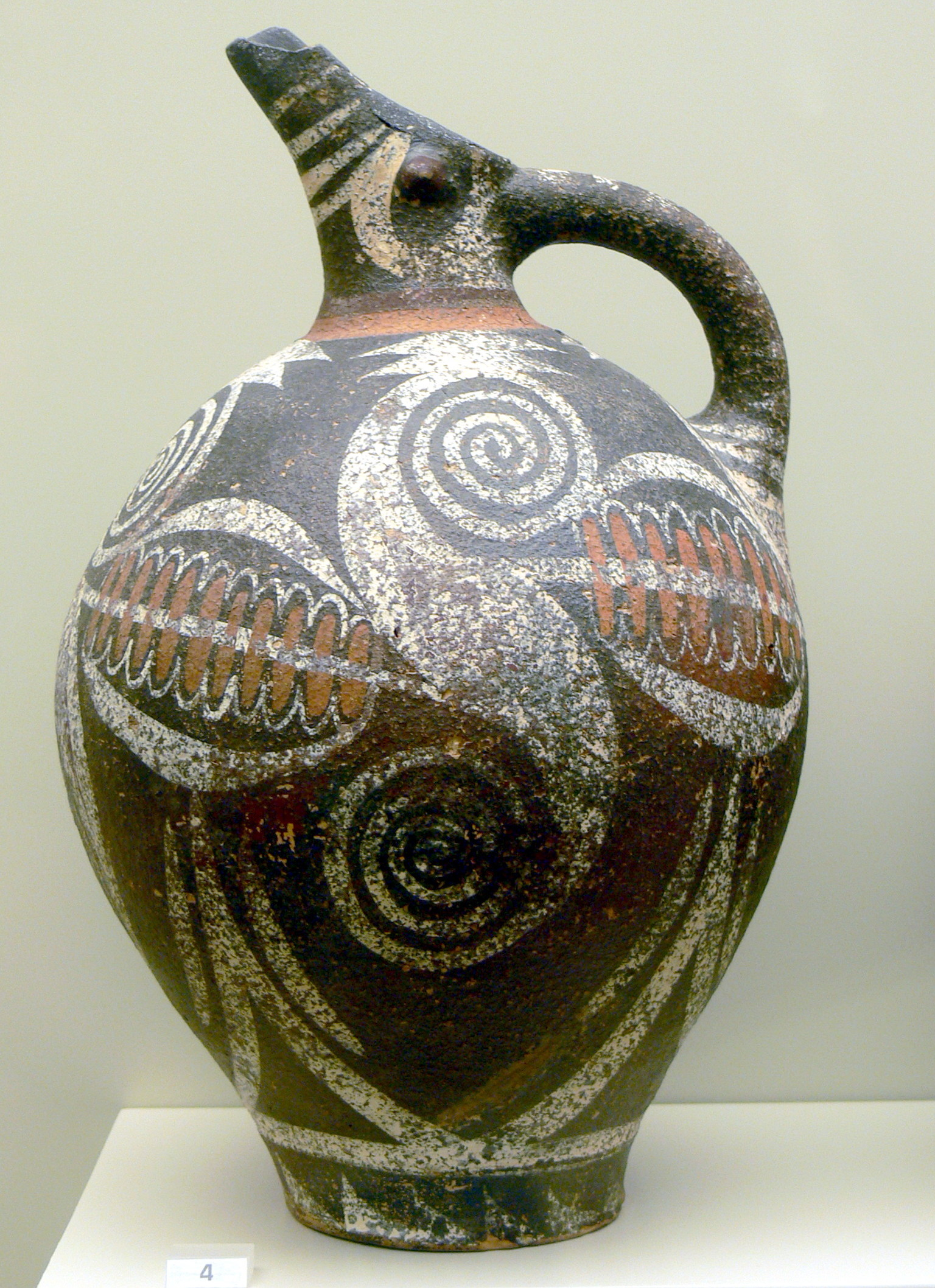
Kamares ware jug

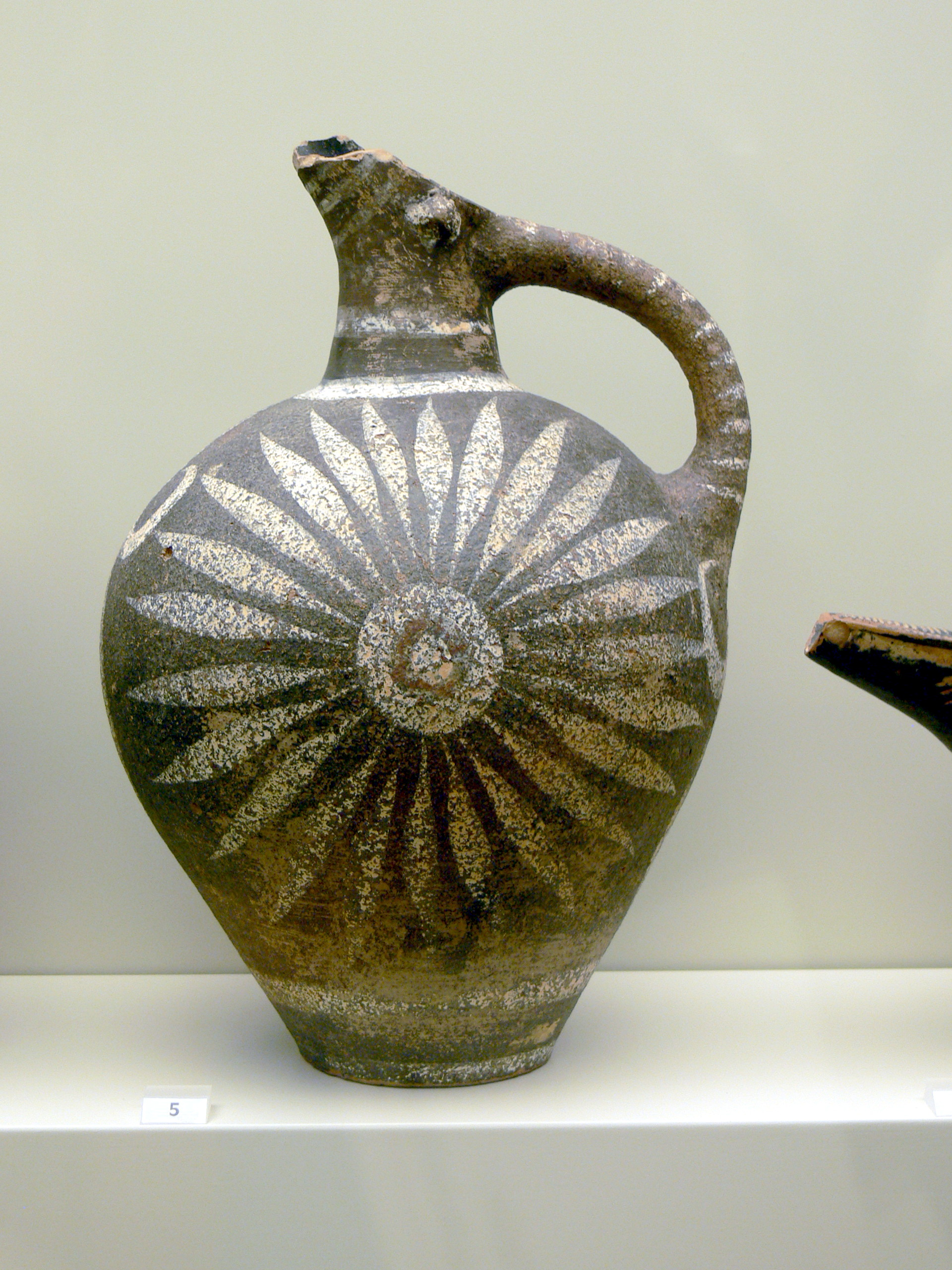
A Kamare style vase, 2100-1700 BCE

Kamares Ware was named after finds in the cave sanctuary at Kamares on Mt. Ida in 1890. It is the first of the virtuoso polychrome wares of Minoan civilization, though the first expressions of recognizably proto-Kamares decor predate the introduction of the potter's wheel.

Finer clay, thrown on the wheel, permitted more precisely fashioned forms, which were covered with a dark-firing slip and exuberantly painted with slips in white, reds and browns in fluent floral designs, of rosettes or conjoined coiling and uncoiling spirals. Designs are repetitive or sometimes free-floating, but always symmetrically composed. Themes from nature begin here with octopuses, shellfish, lilies, crocuses and palm-trees, all highly stylized. The entire surface of the pot is densely covered, but sometimes the space is partitioned by bands. One variety features extravagantly thin bodies and is called Eggshell Ware (Example 1, Example 2).

Four stages of Kamares ware were identified by Gisela Walberg (1976), with a "Classic Kamares" palace style sited in MM II, especially in the palace complex of Phaistos. New shapes were introduced, with whirling and radiating motifs.(Examples 1, Examples 2, Examples 3, Examples 4, Examples 5, Examples 6, Examples 7, Examples 8, Examples 9, Examples 10)

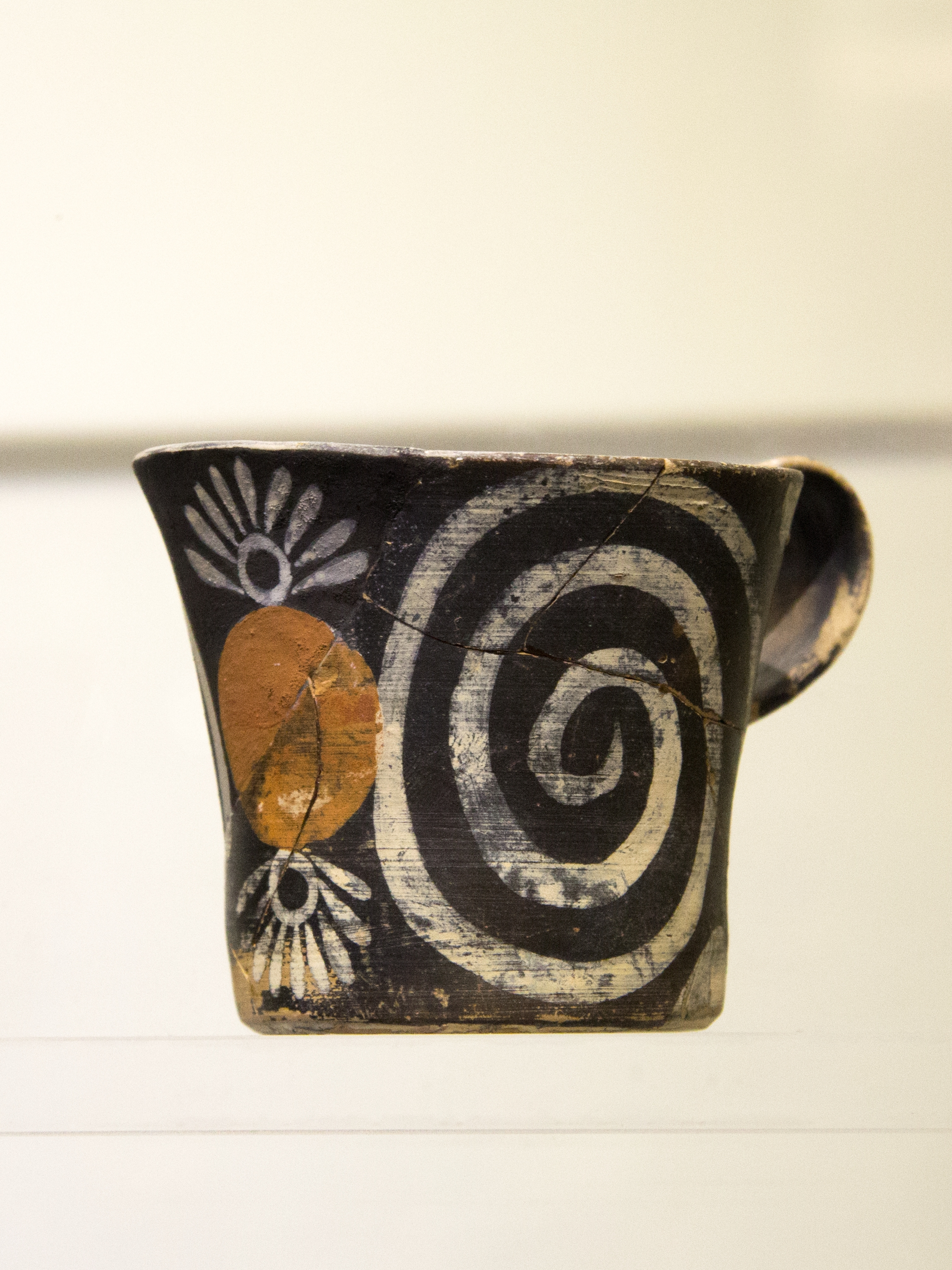
Cup from Phaistos

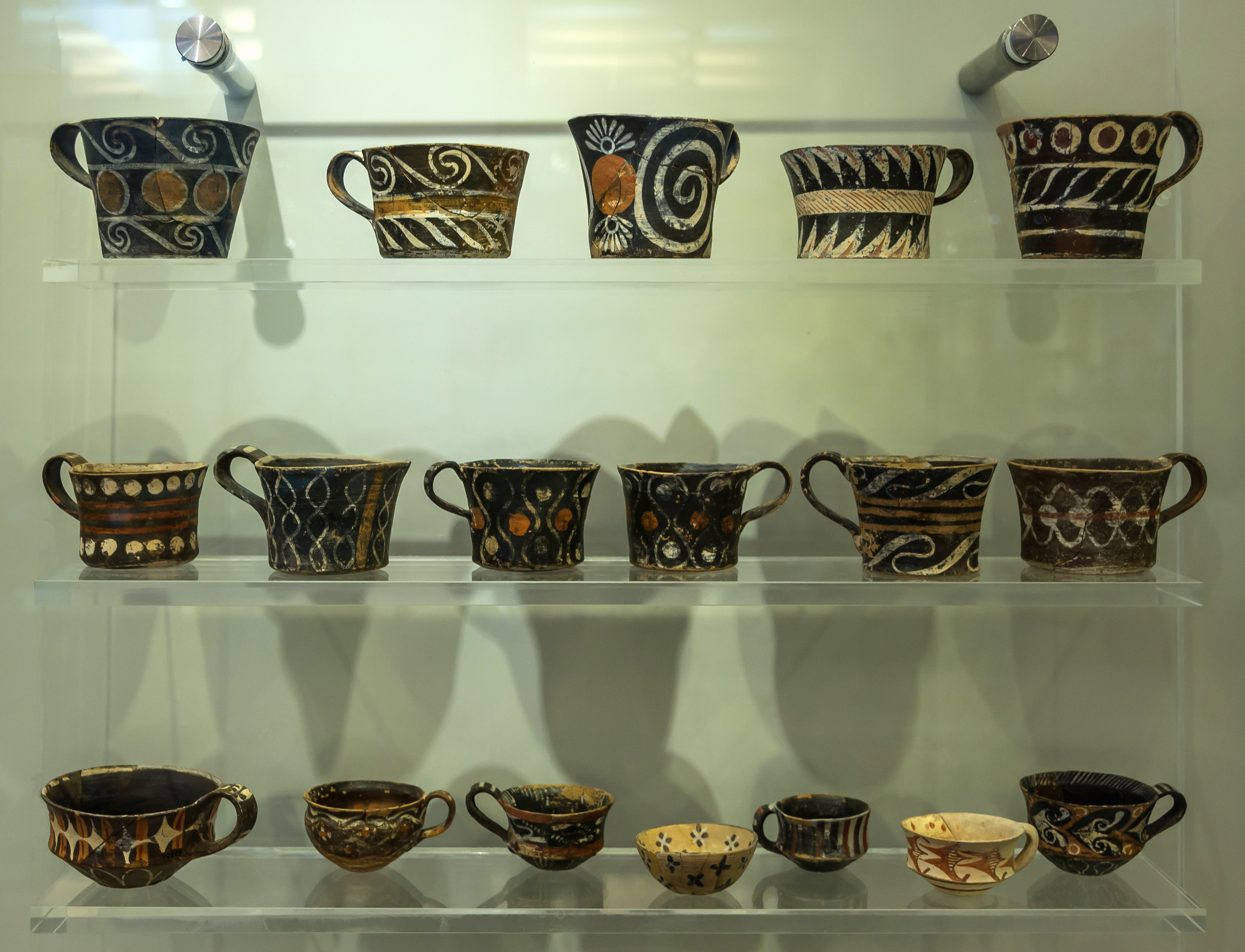
Cups from Phaistos

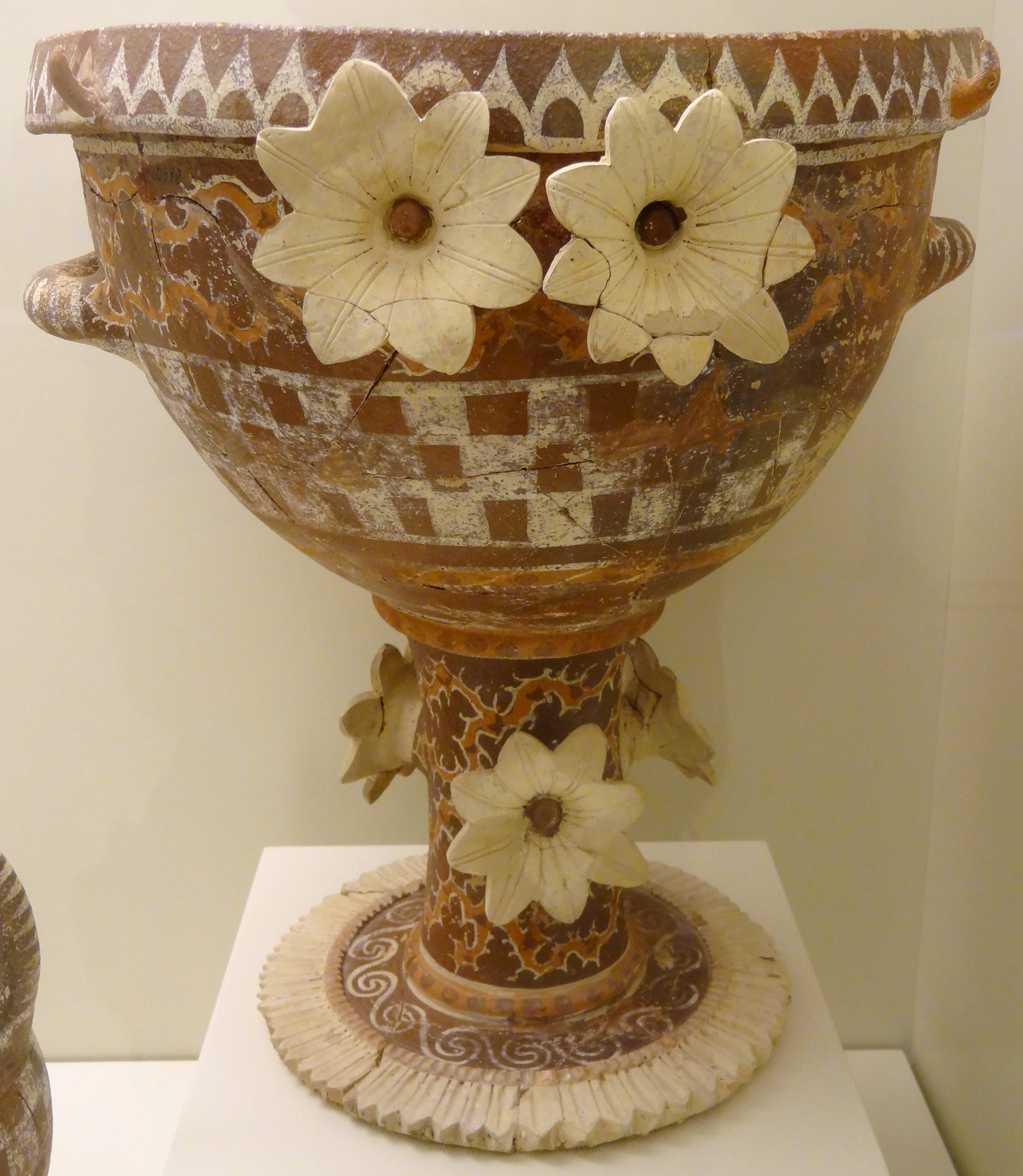
Krater from Phaistos

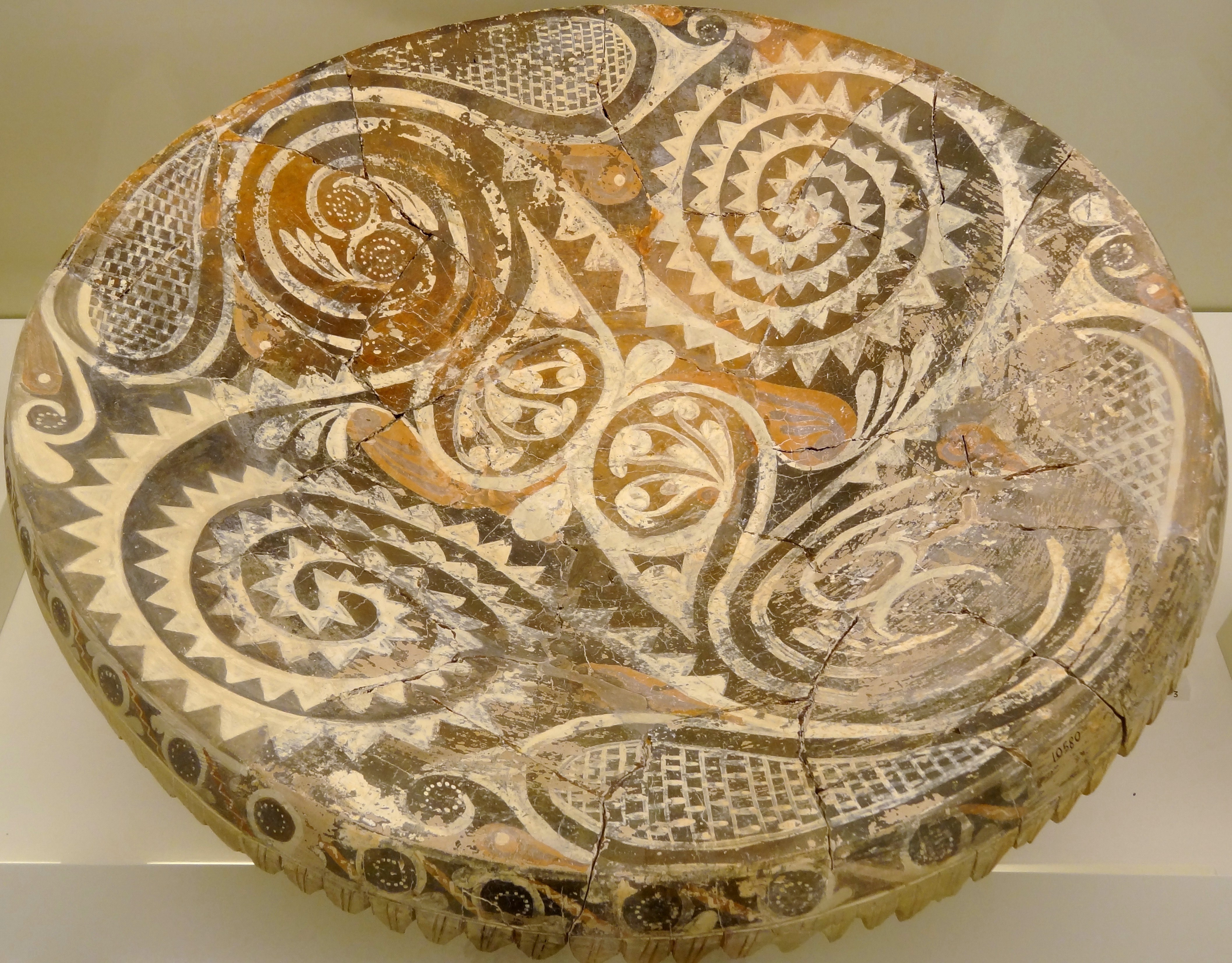
Dish from Phaistos

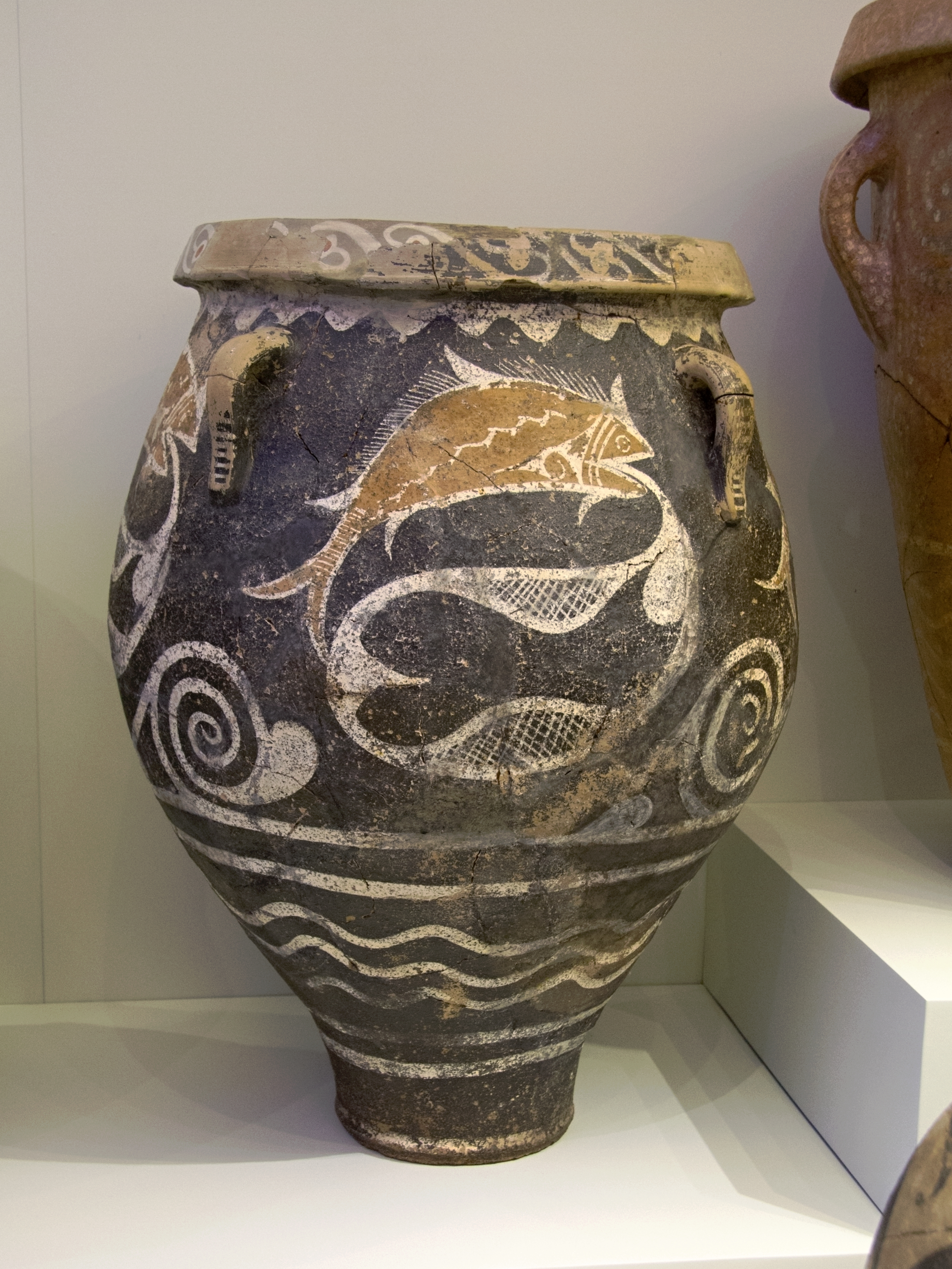
Pithos with fish in a net, Phaistos

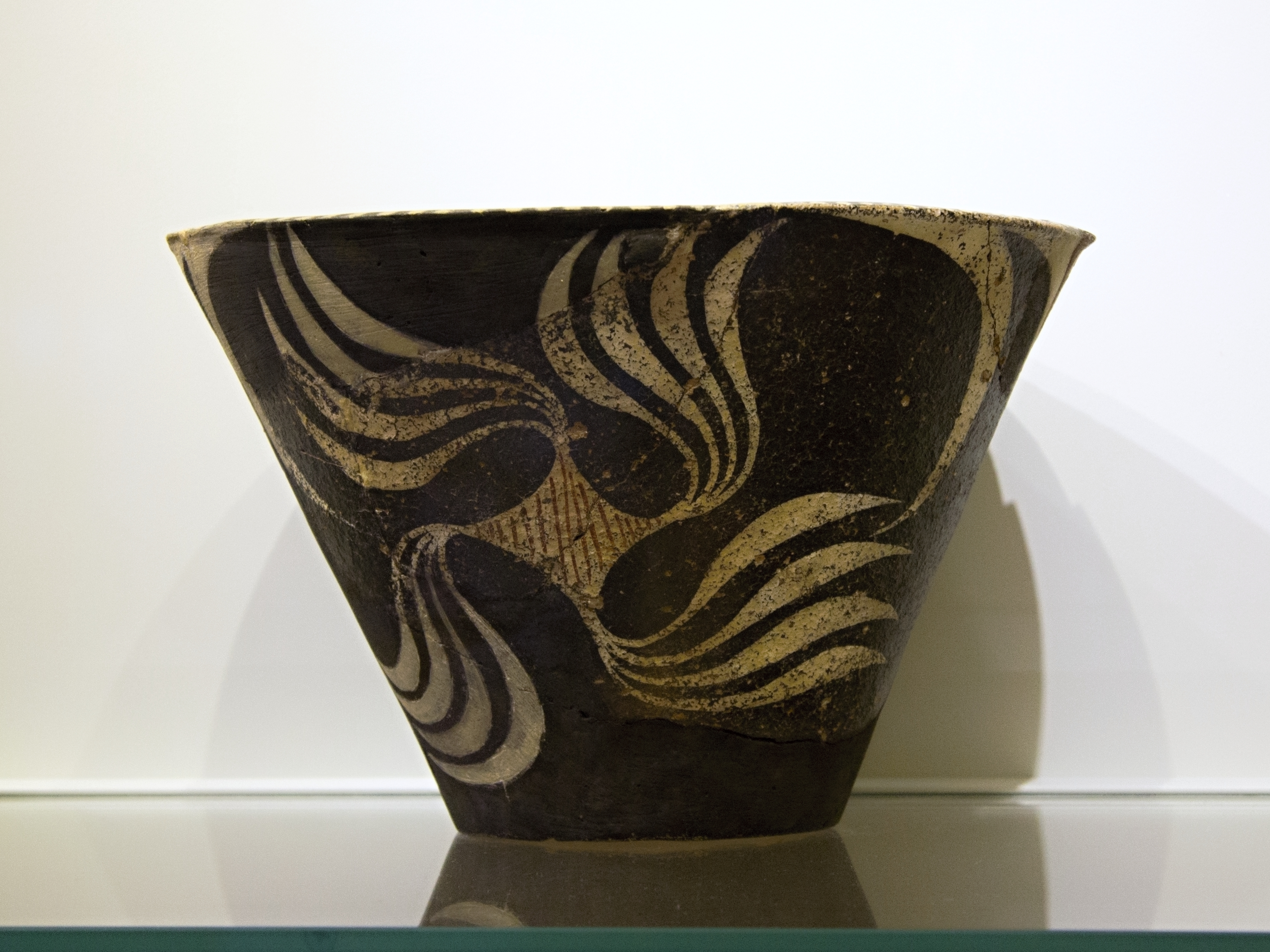
Phaistos

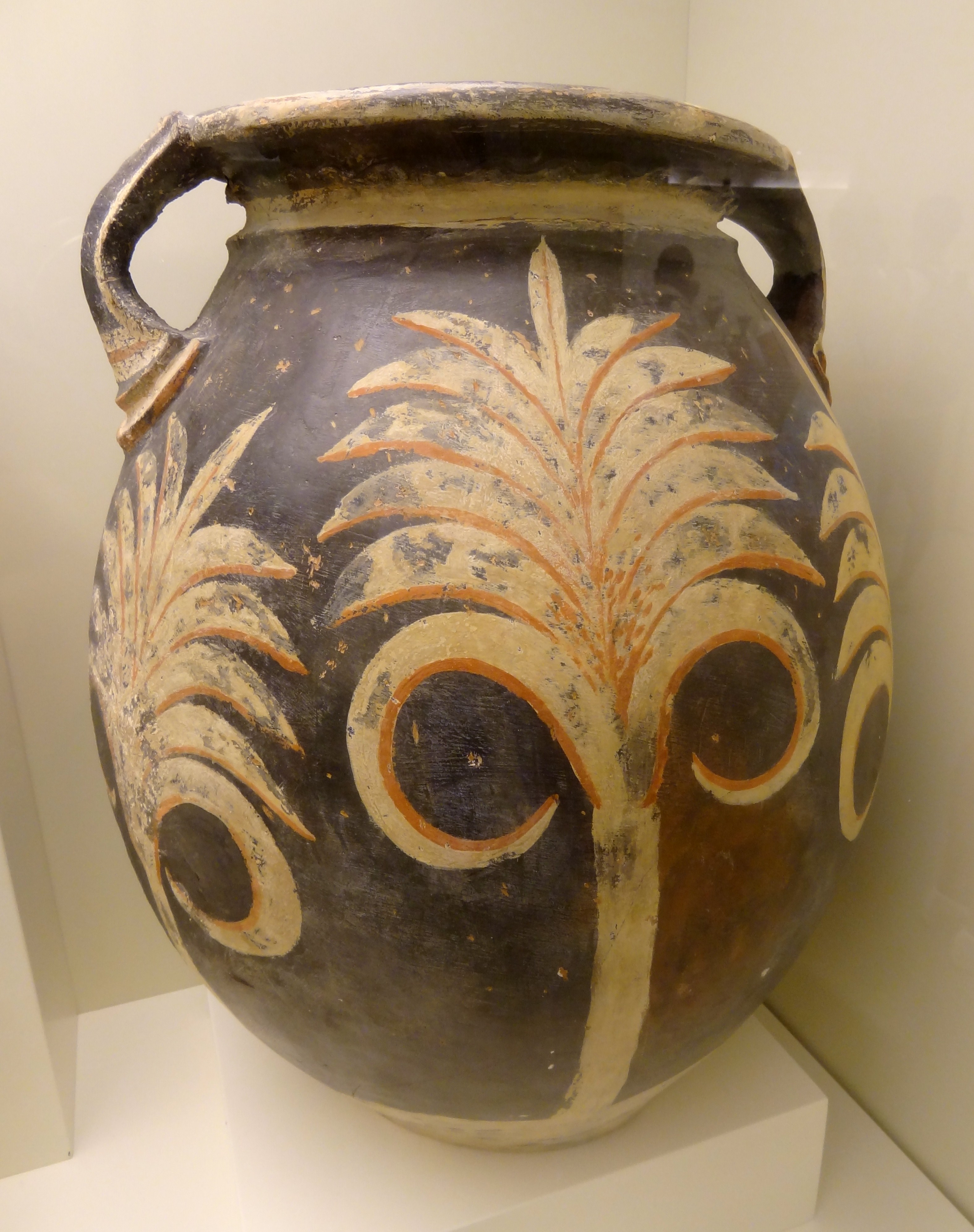

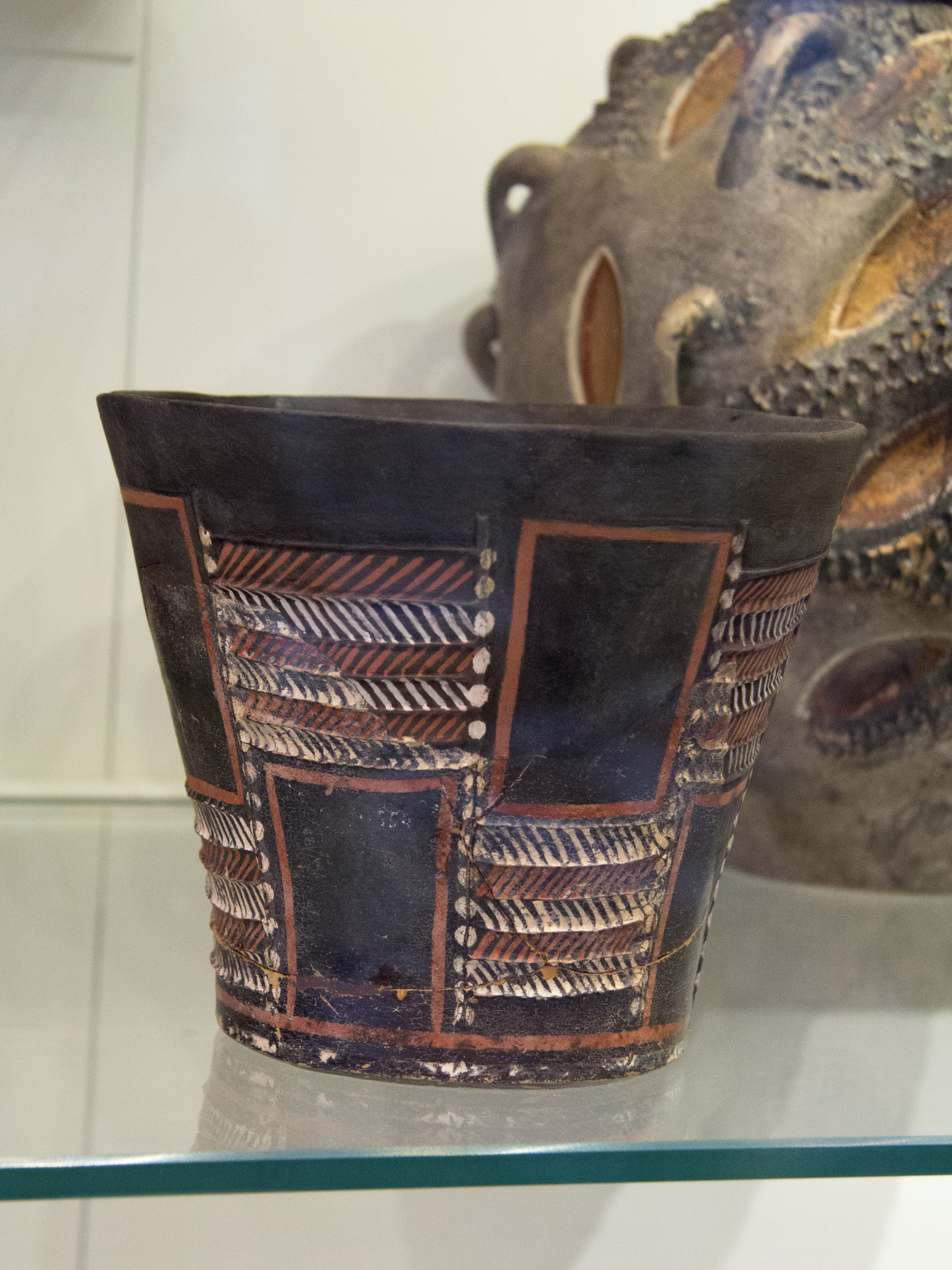

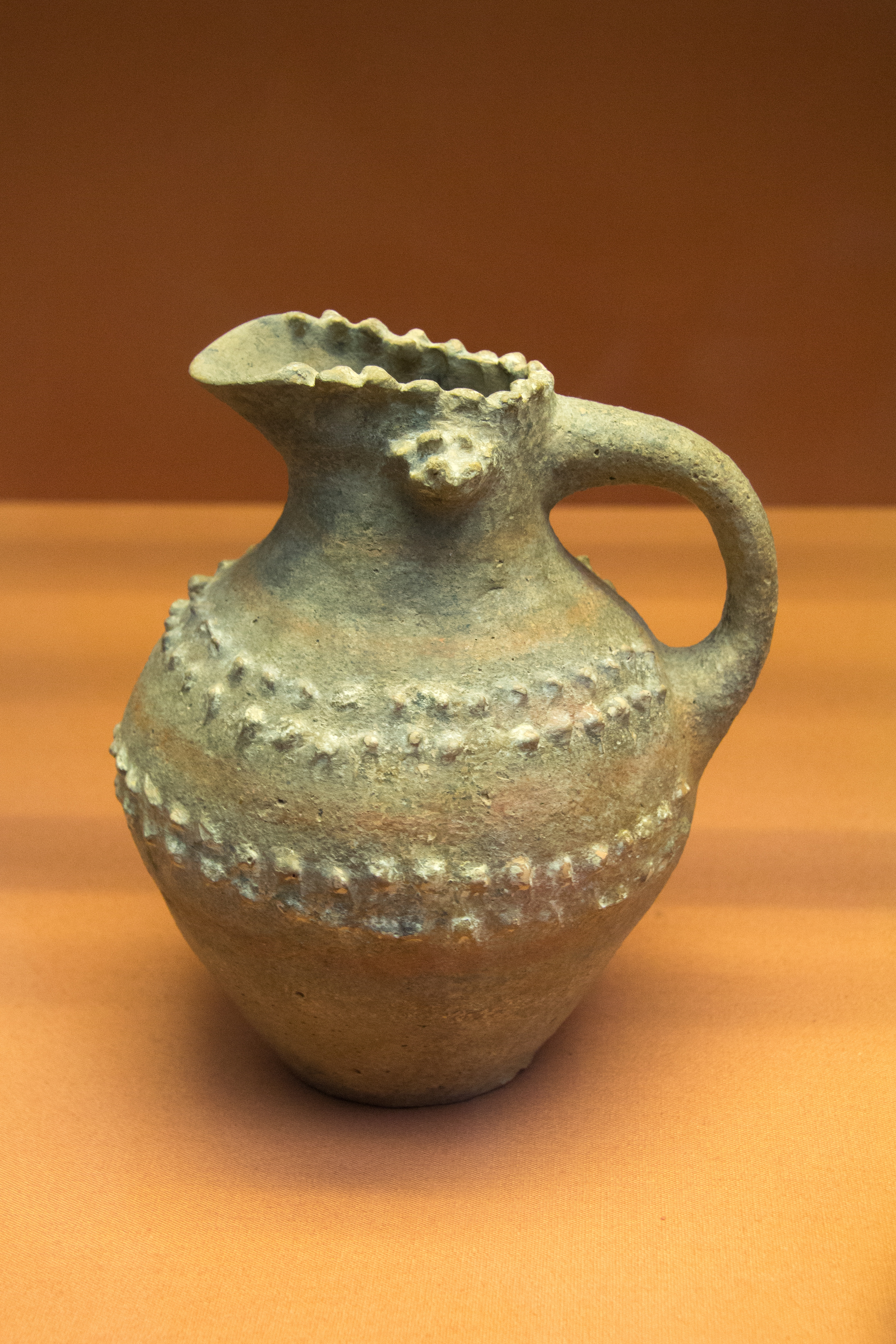
Jug with barbotine decoration, 2100–1950

=== Age of Efflorescence ===
In MMIIB, the increasing use of motifs drawn from nature heralded the decline and end of the Kamares style. The Kamares featured whole-field floral designs with all elements linked together (Matz). In MMIII patterned vegetative designs, the Patterned Style, began to appear. This phase was replaced by individual vegetative scenes, which marks the start of the Floral Style. Matz refers to the "Age of Efflorescence", which reached an apogee in LM IA. (Some would include Kamares Ware under the Floral Style.)

The floral style depicts palms and papyrus, with various kinds of lilies and elaborate leaves. It appears in both pottery and frescoes. One tradition of art criticism calls this the "natural style" or "naturalism" but another points out that the stylized forms and colors are far from natural. Green, the natural color of vegetation, appears rarely. Depth is represented by position around the main scene.

== Late Minoan ==
LMI marks the highwater of Minoan influence throughout the southern Aegean (Peloponnese, Cyclades, Dodecanese, southwestern Anatolia). Late Minoan pottery was widely exported; it has turned up in Cyprus, the Cyclades, Egypt and Mycenae.

=== Floral style ===
Fluent movemented designs drawn from flower and leaf forms, painted in reds and black on white grounds predominate, in steady development from Middle Minoan. In LMIB there is a typical all-over leafy decoration, for which first workshop painters begin to be identifiable through their characteristic motifs; as with all Minoan art, no name ever appears.

=== Marine style ===
In LMIB, the Marine Style also emerges; in this style, perhaps inspired by frescoes, the entire surface of a pot was covered with sea creatures, octopus, fish and dolphins, against a background of rocks, seaweed and sponges (Examples 1, Examples 2, Examples 3, Examples 4). The Marine Style is more free flowing with no distinct zones, because it shows sea creatures as floating, as they would in the ocean. The Marine style was the last purely Minoan style; towards the end of LMIB, all the palaces except Knossos were violently destroyed, as were many of the villas and towns.

=== Rhyta ===
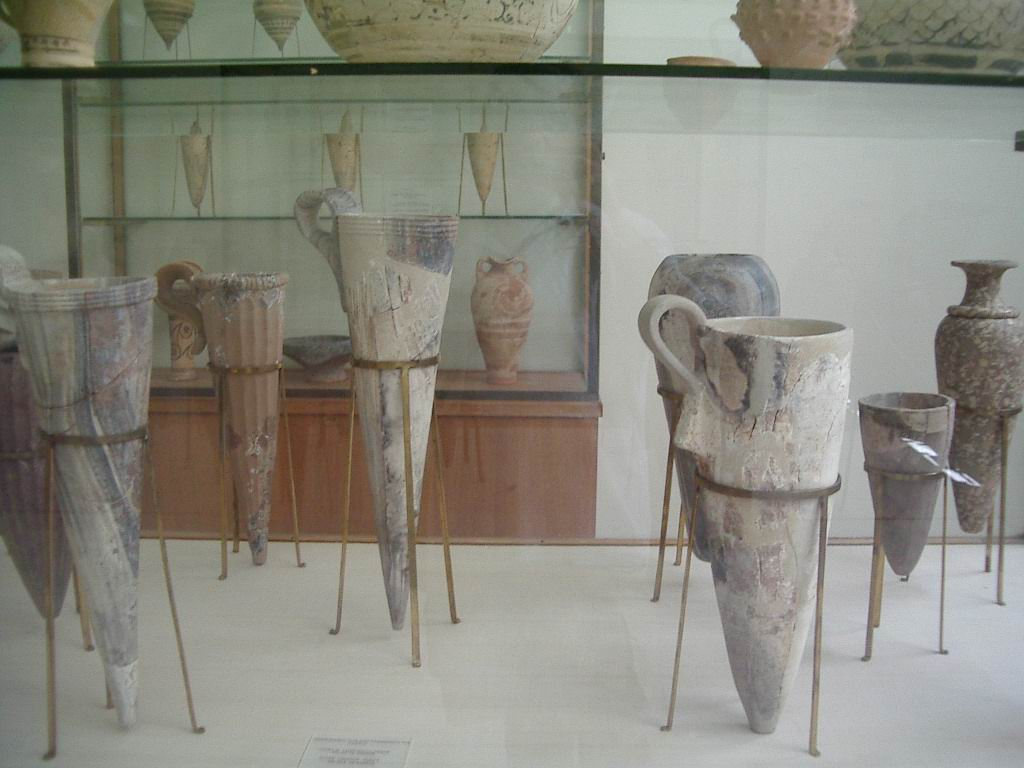
Steatite rhyta in foreground, clay on shelf behind.

Dated to LM IA and following also are conical rhyta, or drinking cups, in steatite and also imitated in ceramic. (Example) Some of the rhyta are ornate libation vessels, such as the noted "Bull's-head Rhyton" found at Knossos. The Bull's Head Rhyton, however, was a specific type of which many instances have been found. The bull's head is found in ceramic as well. Other noted stone vases of LM IA and II are the "Harvester Vase" View 1, View 3, View 4, from Hagia Triada, which depicts a harvest procession, "the Chieftain Cup", depicting a coming-of-age rite, the Boxer Rhyton (Hagia Triada), showing boxing scenes, the Sanctuary Rhyton, depicting a peak sanctuary to the "mistress of animals" and featuring birds and leaping goats, and others.

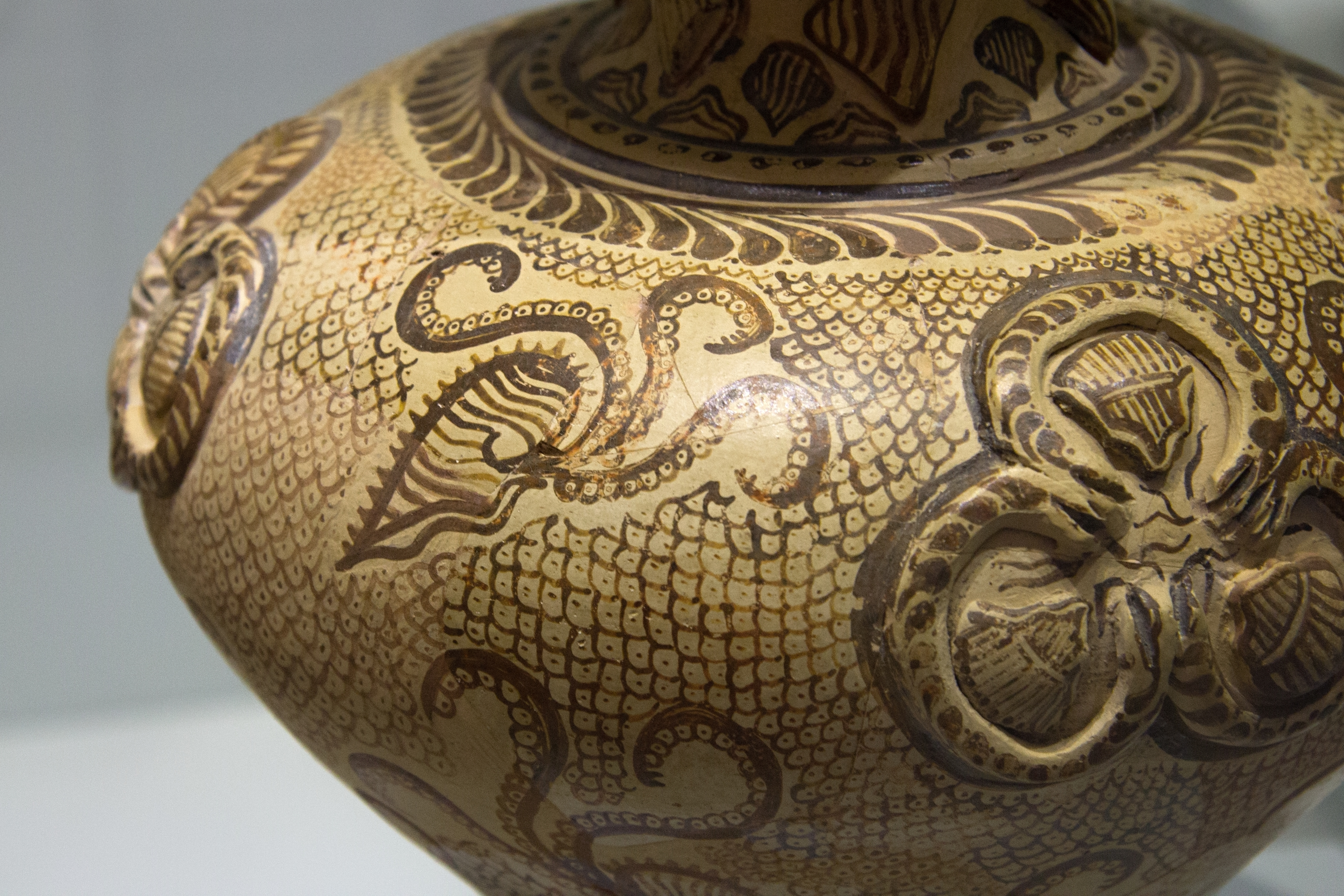
Marine Style "Ewer of Poros", 1500-1450 BC

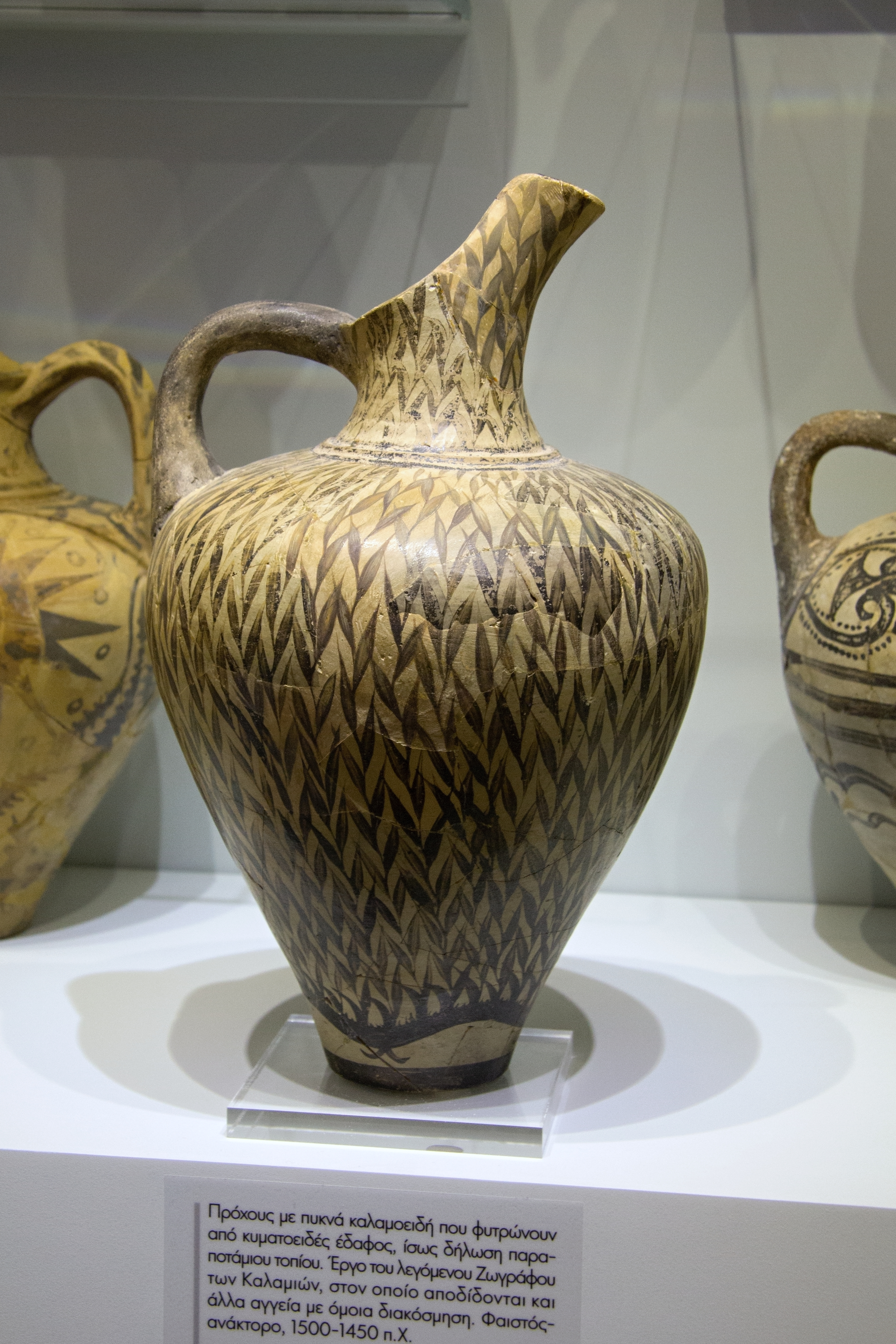
Floral Style ewer from Phaistos, 1500-1450 BC

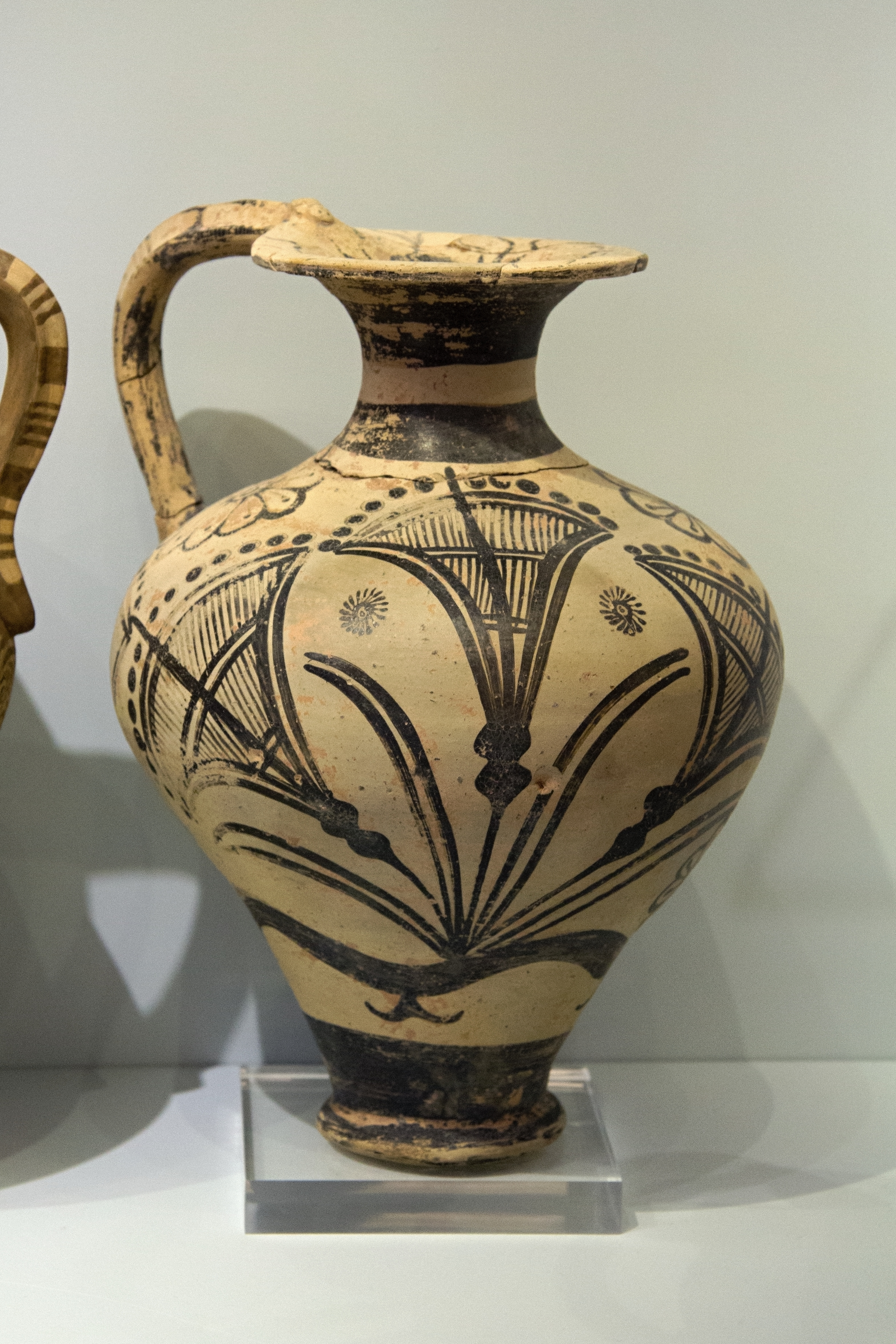
Floral Style ewer with papyrus, from Palaikastro, 1500-1450 BC

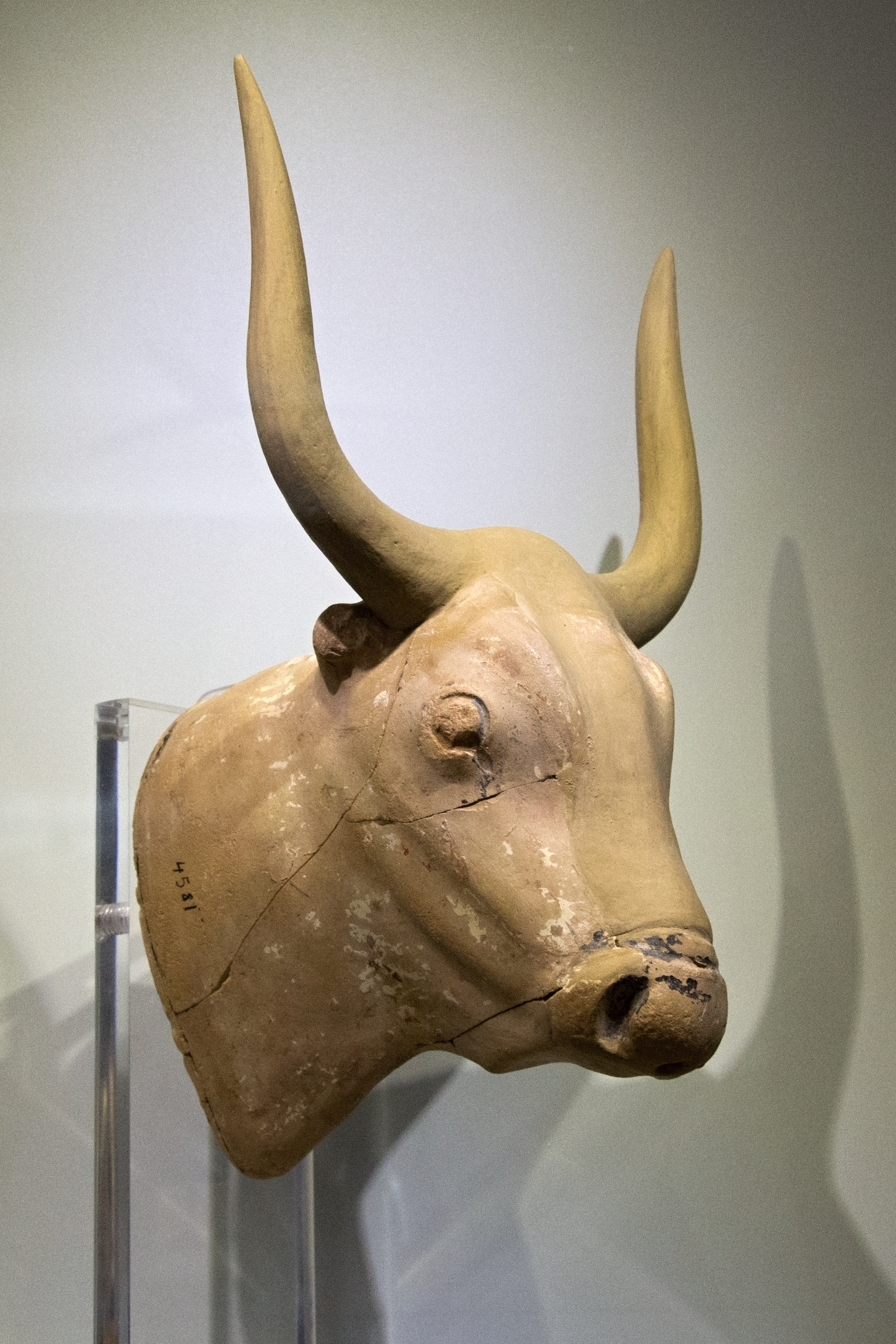
Clay bulls head rhyton, Palaikastro, 1500-1450 BC, AMH

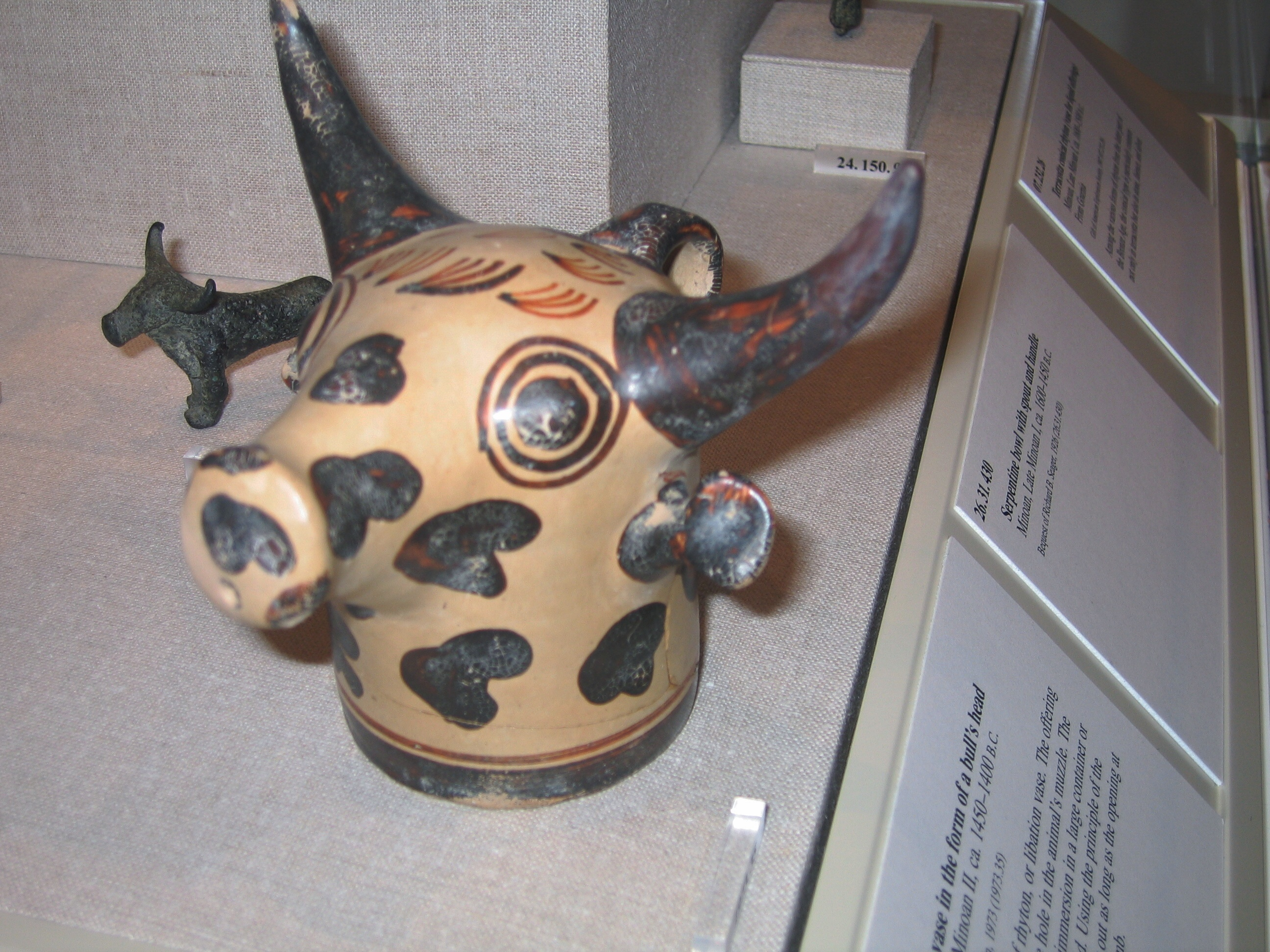
Bull's-head Vase from LM II

== Minoan-Mycenaean ==
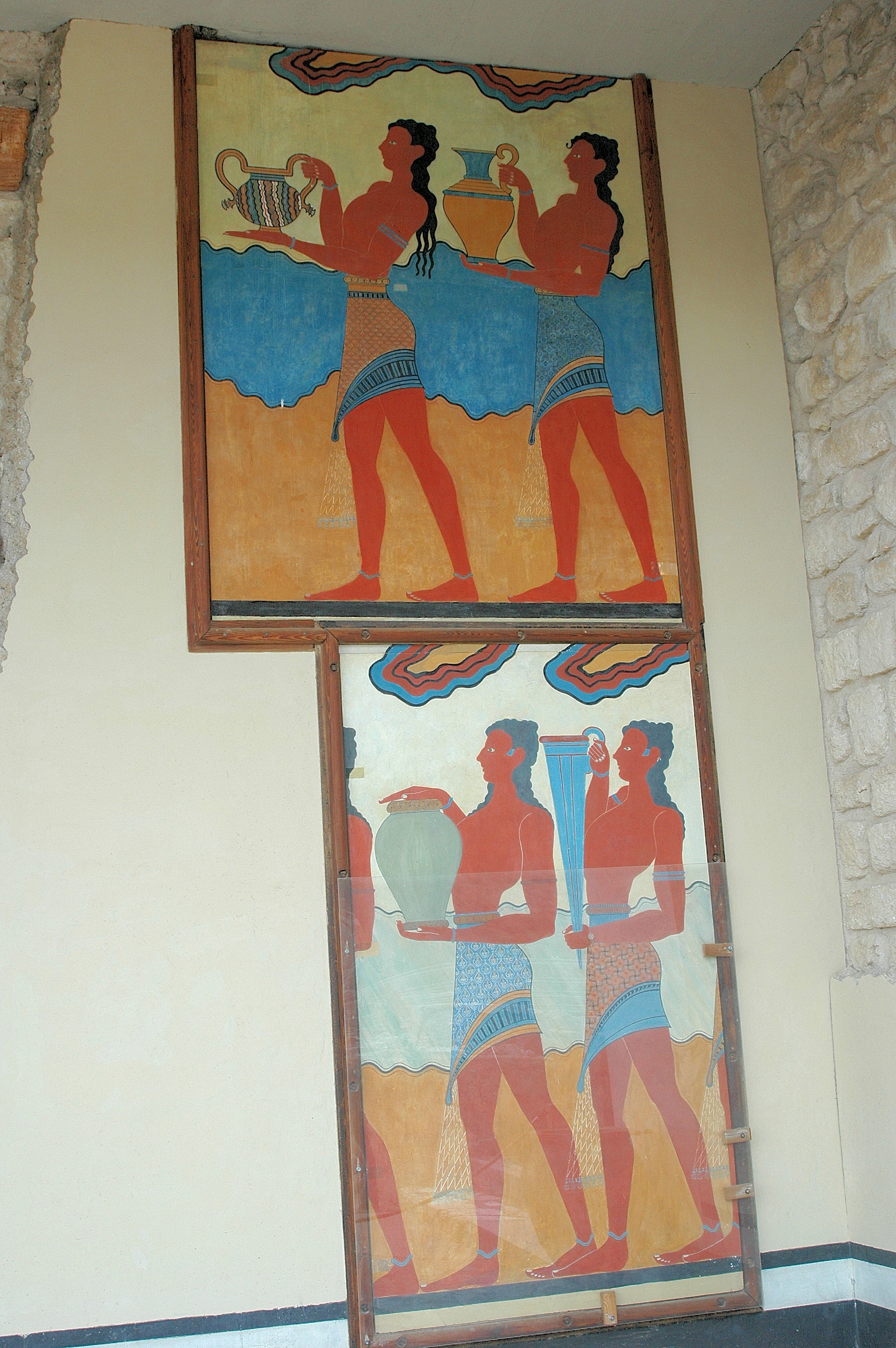
Restored frieze at Knossos showing Minoan ware. Although the rhyton (conical vase) is probably steatite, the other ware is most likely ceramic.

Around 1450 BCE, the beginning of LM II, the Mycenaean Greeks must have moved into the palace of Knossos. They were well-established by 1400, if the Linear B tablets can be dated to then. The resulting LM II culture is not a break with the Minoan past. Minoan traditions continue under a new administration. However, the vase forms and designs became more and more Mycenaean in character with a large variety of decoration. Style names have multiplied and depend to some degree on the author. The names below are only a few of the most common. Some authors just use the name "Mycenaean Koine"; that is, the Late Minoan pottery of Crete was to some degree just a variety of widespread Mycenaean forms. The designs are found also on seals and ceilings, in frescoes and on other artifacts. Often Late Minoan pottery is not easily placed in sub-periods. In addition are imports from the neighboring coasts of the Mediterranean. Ceramic is not the only material used: breccia, calcite, chlorite, schist, dolomite and other colored and patterned stone were carved into pottery forms. Bronze ware appears imitating the ceramic ware.

=== Palace style ===
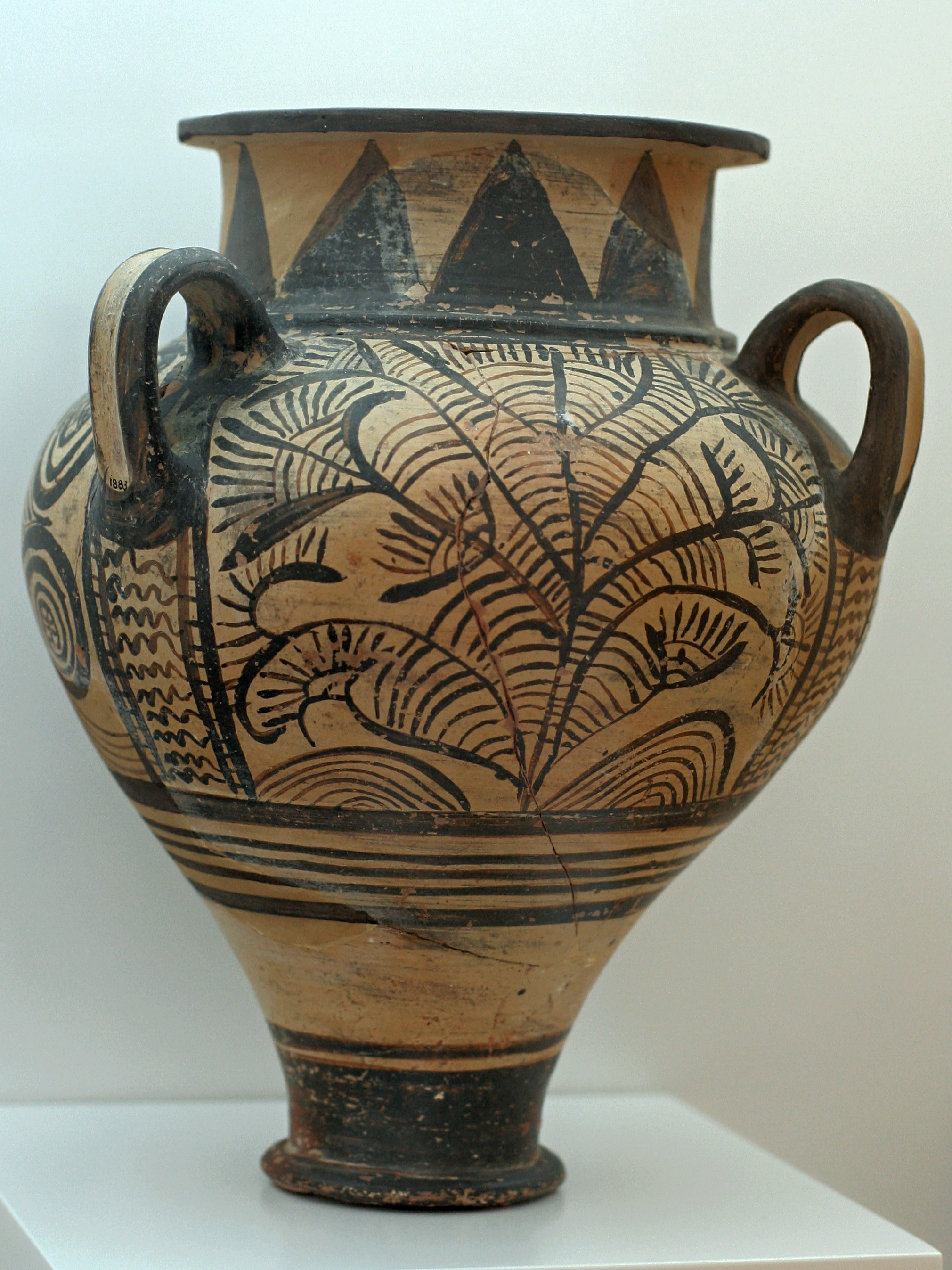
Late Minoan III Floral style, 1400-1100 BC

During LMII, Mycenean influence became apparent. The vase forms at Knossos are similar to those on the mainland. The Palace Style showcased by them adapts elements of the previous styles but also adds features, such as the practice of confining decor in reserves and bands, emphasizing the base and shoulder of the pot and the movement towards abstraction (Examples 1, Examples 2, Examples 3). This style started in LM II and went on into LM III. The palace style was mostly confined to Knossos. In the late manifestation of the palace style, fluent and spontaneous earlier motifs stiffened and became more geometrical and abstracted. Egyptian motifs such as papyrus and lotus are prominent.

=== Plain and Close Styles ===
The Plain Style and Close Style developed in LM IIIA, B from the Palace Style. In the Close Style the Marine and Floral Styles themes continue, but the artist manifests the horror vacui or "dread of emptiness". The whole field of decoration is filled densely. (Examples). The Stirrup Jar is especially frequent.

=== Subminoan ===
Finally, in the Subminoan period, the geometric designs of the Dorians become more apparent. (Example)

== Discovery and recognition ==
Minoan wares were already familiar from finds on the Greek mainland, and export markets like Egypt, before it was realized that they came from Crete. In most 19th-century literature they are described as "Mycenaean", and the recognition and analysis of styles and periods had gone some way on this assumption. Only in the 1890s were the first finds on Crete recognised and published, from a cave at Kamares. These were found by a local archaeologist who allowed the young John Myres to publish them; Myres had realized that they were the same ware as finds in Egypt published by Flinders Petrie. For several decades analysis of Minoan pottery was essentially stylistic and typological, but in recent decades there has been a turn towards technical and socio-economic analysis.

== Written records of pots and pans ==
The Linear B tablets contain records of vessels made of various materials. The vessel ideograms are not so clear as to make correlation with discovered artifacts easy. Using a drawing of the "Contents of the Tomb of the Tripod Hearth" at Zafer Papoura from Evans' Palace of Minos, which depicts LM II bronze vessels, many in the forms of ceramic ones, Ventris and Chadwick were able to make a few new correlations.

LM II Vessels
Ideogram	Linear B	Mycenaean Greek	Classical Greek	Etymology	Examples
202 GOBLET?	di-pa	*dipas (sing)	depas (sing), cup, archaic large vessel.	C.Luvian tappas and H. Luvian (CAELUM)ti-pa-sº 'sky (perceived by Anatolians as a cup covering the flat Earth)' (Yakubovich 2010: 146)	1
207 TRIPOD AMPHORA	ku-ru-su-pa_{3}	Possibly *khrysyphaia or possibly containing Semitic suppu "vase".	?	Possibly "gold and grey" if Greek or "golden vase" if Semitic	1 (Early Cypriote)
209 AMPHORA	a-pi-po-re-we	*amphiphorewes (pl)	amphiphoreus (sing), an amphora	"port-about" (Hoffman)	1
210 STIRRUP JAR	ka-ra-re-we	*khlarewes (pl)	khlaron (sing), archaic oil jar	"yellow stuff" (Hoffman)	1, 2, 3, 4
211 WATER BOWL?	po-ti-[]-we	?	?	?	
212 WATER JAR?	u-do-ro	*hudroi (pl)	hydros (sing), a water-snake	"water (jars)"	1
213 COOKING BOWL	i-po-no	*ipnoi (pl)	ipnos (sing), a baking dish	"Dutch oven"	

== See also ==
- Poppy goddess, a LM figurine
- Thrapsano, then and now, a village known for pottery
