= Synoecism (disambiguation) =

Synoecism can mean:

- Synoecism, Syniokismos, Sunoikismos, Synoecismus, the incorporation or conurbation of smaller settlements into a city (urbs, polis) or municipality (municipium)
- Synoikia, a festival at ancient Athens
- Synoecia, a subgenus of Ficus
- Synoecism, the botanical condition of being synoecious, a synonym of monoecious

== See also ==
- Dioecism (disambiguation)
