= Phourni =

Minoan cemetery in Crete, Greece

Coordinates: 35°14′46″N 25°09′31″E

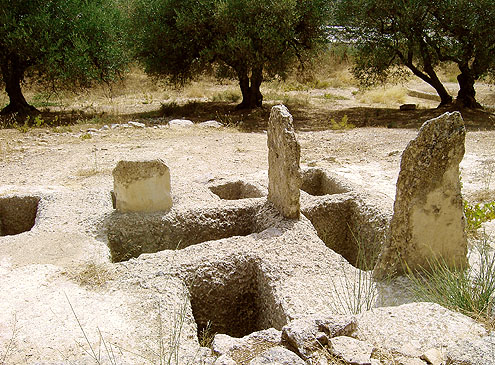
Phourni.

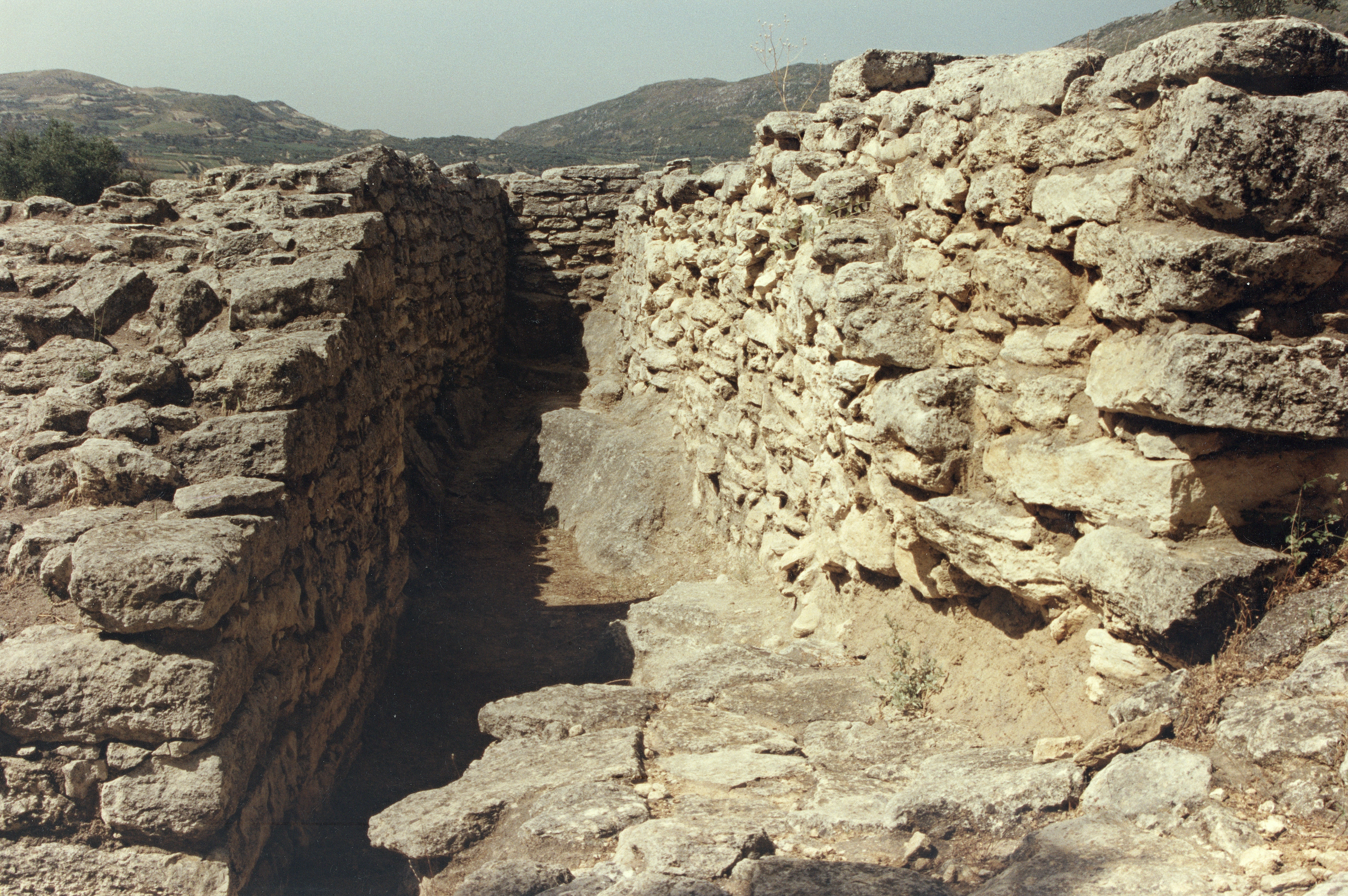
Phourni at Archanes.

Phourni (Greek: Φουρνί, also Fourni) is the archaeological site of an ancient Minoan cemetery in Crete, established in 2400 BC and lasted until 1200 BC. Phourni is Greek for "furnace, oven" and the name of the hill on which the cemetery is located. Phourni is located at 70100 Epano Archanes, Heraklion, Greece—located on a hill in north-central Crete. Phourni can be seen from Mount Juktas. It is a small hill situated northwest of Archanes, between Archanes and Kato Archanes. Phourni is reachable from a signed scenic path that starts at Archanes. It was an important site for Minoan burials. The burials consistently and proactively engaged the community of the Minoans. The largest cemetery in the Archanes area was discovered in 1957 and excavated for 25 years by Yiannis Sakellarakis, beginning in 1965. The 6600 sq m cemetery includes 26 funerary buildings of varying shapes and sizes. The necropolis of Phourni is of primary importance, both for the duration of its use and for the variety of its funerary monuments. All the pottery and much of the skeletal material was collected, unlike many other pre-palatial tombs. The cemetery was founded in the Ancient Minoan IIA, and continued to be used until the end of the Bronze Age. The occupation reached its peak during the Middle Minoan AI, just before the palaces of Knossos and Malia appeared. The proximity of Archanes to the important religious centres of Mount Iuktas probably contributed to the prominence of the site.

== Funerary practices ==
People were buried in either “House Tombs” which are rectangular long and narrow chambers or tholos tombs which are rounded structures that were built into a hillside. At Phourni, it was quite common to complete a primary burial: one that is complete and undisturbed, as no remains were moved after the fact. While rare, there were also secondary manipulations of the decayed human remains. A manipulation is an intentional rearrangement of human remains years after the primary burial. An example of a burial with the secondary manipulation of the body was found in Building 7, where there was an initial burial, and after the skull had decayed, it was detached from the jaw and placed near the feet of the human. This act was clearly intentional and meaningful towards the burial practices at Phourni. The organizational method of each burial was dependent on the identities (different cultures and religions believed in different ways how the dead should be treated), of the people performing the practice. There were also material goods buried with people in various cases. "The artifacts from the tombs (vessels of both pottery and stone, tools and weapons, jewelry, and seals) show that a dead person was buried with his or her personal belongings as well as with food and drink (for the next life?). Since the dead were supplied with food and drink, they were presumably primary burials (i.e. fully articulated bodies) and not secondary collections of bones. Most of the grave goods show signs of use in mortal life (i.e. they were not designed specifically for funerary purposes)."

== Archaeology ==
Excavations began at Phourni in 1965 by Efi and Yannis Sakellarakis and have continued until at least 1995. The cemetery at Phourni was in use from Early Minoan II to Late Minoan IIIC - over one thousand years. A tholos tomb first discovered in 1965 dates to 14th century BCE and shares a ground plan with tholos tombs at Mycenae and Orchomenus. Early Minoan tholos tombs and ossuaries have been excavated in the south part of the cemetery. Finds include a dismembered corpse of a sacrificed horse, a bull's skull, a gold ring from a burial with a cultic scene engraved on it, knives, lead weights from a scale, 46 loom weights, a wine press, a libation table, bell-shaped figurines, approximately 250 cups, Early Minoan II seals, an Egyptian diorite vase, ivory seals and amulets and a pillar crypt. The bodies of two women found in a Late Minoan tholos tomb are of almost certain royal or religious importance due to the wealth of objects and the unusual sacrifices of a horse and a bull made to the chambers.

Further, the Mycenaean Grave Enclosure is a part of the funerary complex located in the northern area of the cemetery. It had seven different rectangular house tombs. Apart from the Grave Enclosure, there are several different tombs in the cemetery. A short distance south of the Grave Enclosure is Tholos Tomb A. It had been found with various offerings like bronze and ivory vases, gold signet rings and necklaces, beads, and glass-paste. Further south into the cemetery is Tholos Tomb B. This was found to be the greatest in size and most complex structure in the cemetery that has a tholos in the middle of it along with twelve rooms. Built above ground level, Tholos Tomb C, the second tomb to be built in the cemetery, is a construction built above the ground in the south west area of the cemetery. There is evidence of burials put into sarcophagi (stone coffins) with numerous offerings. The most south of the tombs is Tholos Tomb D. When excavated, it was found to have an undisturbed female burial inside. Tholos Tomb E is thought to be the initial funerary building created at the site, containing multiple burials and offerings. Along with the five tholoi, there are 26 buildings on the site. Some buildings were built in the Pre-Palatial period—the time they were most frequently used, but others were also built in the Proto-palatial period.

Finds excavated from Phourni are at the Heraklion Archaeological Museum.

== Excavation of seal stones ==
A seal stone is one of the various artifacts that archaeologists uncovered in the time of the Bronze Age in Greece, specifically in Phourni. The seal stones found at Phourni are particularly important because it is the largest collection found at a single site in northern Crete. There were 136 seals found at the site. They were made from stone, hippopotamus ivory, bone, metals, or boar's tusk. These seal stones were unique (no two seal stones are the same) personal items with an important meaning to each individual. They are important because they were buried with their owner's bones. They were used for many purposes including jewelry, a form of identification, and to show ownership of someone or something. Seal stones were personable, as they distinguished Minoans from one another through their status, identity, religion, or record-keeping modes. They were seen as a way to "express personal status that emerged from group identity. Perhaps the leaders of each group in a community possessed a seal that showed both group identity and personal position and status, being used in various activities (e.g. economic-administrative, religious)." The Minoans would place one’s seal stones in the grave with the person who had died, marking the particular significance of a seal stone regarding the life and death of a Minoan. Seal stones offer implications about technology, craft, religion, economy, and hierarchal society amongst the Minoan civilization. The iconography of the seal stones are helpful in understanding Minoan religious practices or personality of the owner, depending on the scene of the seal stone.

The 136 seal stones are categorized into different phases based on Minoan Chronology (the suspected time when they were built): Phase I-Phase IV. The seal stones date back to EMI to MMIA. "Phase I covers the first part of the prepalatial period, phase II the later pre-palatial and Phase III starts at the end of the pre-palatial and lasts until the early phase of the first palaces." Using the seal stones from Archanes, excavators have been able to "clarify the periods of use of various materials used for sealstone manufacture", "provide some further resolution of the chronological succession and typology of shapes", "offer some possible insights into the social significance" of sealstones as only a small percentage of the population used them.

Generic Minoan Sealstones can be viewed at as well.
