= Mount Juktas =

Mountain in north-central Crete

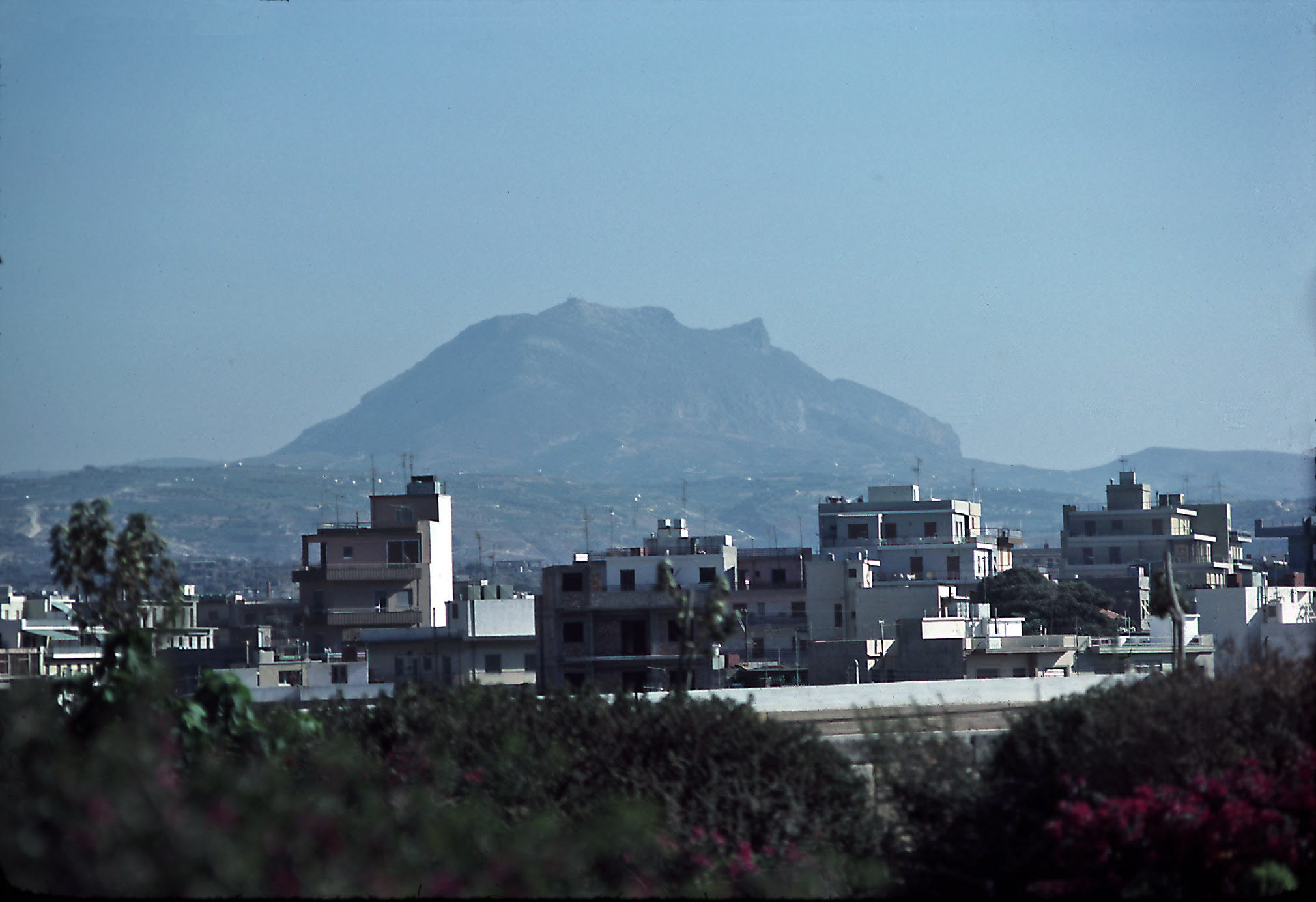
- Juktas's outline looks similar to the face of a bearded human.

Highest point
- Elevation: 811 m (2,661 ft)
- Coordinates: 35°13′57″N 25°8′37″E

Geography
- Location within Greece
- Location: Island of Crete, Greece

Mount Juktas (Greek: Γιούχτας - Giouchtas), also spelled Iuktas, Iouktas, or Ioukhtas, is mountain in north-central Crete, in Greece. It is located south of Heraklion, and rises to a height of 811 m (2,661 ft) above the town of Archanes. Located a few kilometers from the palaces of Knossos and Fourni and the megaron at Vathypetro, Mount Juktas was the site of an important peak sanctuary in the Minoan world. At the base of Juktas, at Anemospilia, is a site that has suggested to some that the Minoans practiced human sacrifice, but the evidence is currently somewhat in question.

== Peak Sanctuary ==
Mount Juktas is the site of one of the most important peak sanctuaries in the Minoan world, and probably the first of them.

=== Archaeological importance ===
Archaeologists have studied the site over an extensive period, examining fragments of pottery, remains of walls, and some unique kinds of stone that must have been hauled up the mountain because they do not otherwise occur there.

=== Religious importance ===
The mountain remains important in the religious life of the people of the area to this day – a Greek Orthodox chapel is located about a kilometer south of the sanctuary along the ridge of the mountain. Every year, people from towns down in the plains below Mount Juktas bring flowers in procession to the chapel.

== Archaeology ==
Juktas was first excavated in 1909 by Sir Arthur Evans. It can be regarded as an adjunct archaeological site to the important Knossos site a few kilometres away. Among the finds at the Juktas Minoan peak sanctuary were clay human and animal figurines, stone horns, stone altars, bronze double axes, and both bowls and tables with Linear A inscriptions. See references for a more comprehensive inventory. Pottery sherds from the site date back as far as Middle Minoan IA.
