= Kairatos =

- Native name: Καίρατος (Greek)

Location
- Country: Greece

Physical characteristics
- Mouth
  - location: Aegean Sea
  - coordinates: 35.345°N 25.153°E

The Kairatos (Greek: Καίρατος, Latin: Caeratus) is a natural watercourse on the island of Crete in Greece. In the Minoan era, aqueducts diverted water to Kephala hill from spring water sources at Archanes, which springs are the headwaters of the Kairatos River; in fact, the Bronze Age palace of Knossos lay upon the gently sloping banks of the Kairatos. The Kairatos runs east of Knossos and flows into the Aegean Sea in the Katsampas area, 1.5 km east of the city center of Heraklion.
