= Dioecism =

Dioecism, dioikismos, dioecismus, can mean:

- Dioecism, the removal from a city of its formerly subordinate constituents, the opposite of synoecism
- Dioecism, the botanical condition of being dioecious, dioecy
- Dioecism, a type of biological sex allocation

== See also ==
- Synoecism (disambiguation)
