= Organized Crime Directorate (Hellenic Police) =

Organized Crime Directorate (Διεύθυνση Αντιμετώπισης Οργανωμένου Εγκλήματος)
- Logo of the Organized Crime Directorate
- Abbreviation: Δ.Α.Ο.Ε.

Agency overview
- Formed: 21 October 2024
- Employees: ~1200 (estimated)

Jurisdictional structure
- National agency: Greece
- Operations jurisdiction: Greece
- Governing body: Hellenic Police (Ελληνική Αστυνομία - ΕΛ.ΑΣ.)
- Constituting instrument: Presidential Decree 29/2024
- General nature: Civilian police

Operational structure
- Headquarters: Alexandras Avenue 173, Athens, Greece
- Agency executives: Major General Photis Ntouitsis, Director; Major General Ioannis Stavrakakis, Deputy Director
- Child agencies: Subdirectorate of Organized Crime of Northern Greece (Υποδιεύθυνση Αντιμετώπίσης Οργανωμένου Εγκλήματος Βορείου Ελλάδος - Υ.Α.Ο.Ε.Β.Ε.); Subdirectorate of Organized Crime of Crete (Υποδιεύθυνση Αντιμετώπίσης Οργανωμένου Εγκλήματος Κρήτης - Υ.Α.Ο.Ε.Κ.)

The Organized Crime Directorate (Greek: Διεύθυνση Αντιμετώπισης Οργανωμένου Εγκλημάτος, abbreviated Δ.Α.Ο.Ε.) is one of the Central Investigative Services of the Hellenic Police with national territorial jurisdiction. It was founded on September 1, 2024, with Presidential Decree 29/2024 and officially started operating on October 21, 2024. It is headquartered in the General Regional Police Directorate of Attica in Athens. Operationally however, it falls directly under the command of the Hellenic Police Headquarters and more specifically under the chief of police, who personally oversees and coordinates its operations. The inaugural and current director of the service is Major General Photis Ntouitsis (Φώτης Ντούιτσης), while Major General Ioannis Stavrakakis (Ιωάννης Σταυρακάκης) serves as deputy director.

The directorate has several subdirectorates and departments under its command, which are dedicated to the investigation and suppression of a variety of criminal activities. It also commands 2 regional subdirectorates; the Subdirectorate of Organized Crime of Northern Greece (Υποδιεύθυνση Αντιμετώπισης Οργανωμένου Εκλήματος Βορείου Ελλάδος - Υ.Α.Ο.Ε.Β.Ε.), headed by Police Director Aristidis Mintzas, and the Subdirectorate of Organized Crime of Crete (Υποδιεύθυνση Αντιμετώπισης Οργανωμένου Εγκλήματος Κρήτης - Υ.Α.Ο.Ε.Κ.), headed by Police Deputy Director Emmanouil Piperakis. The former is headquartered in the city of Thessaloniki and has territorial jurisdiction over the northern Regions of the country (namely East Macedonia and Thrace, Central Macedonia, West Macedonia, Thessaly, Epirus and North Aegean). The latter is headquartered in rural town of Archanes in the Regional Unit of Heraklion and has jurisdiction over the entire island region of Crete.

The service has unofficially been dubbed the "Greek FBI", both by the media, but also by the minister of Citizen Protection, who is the civilian supervisor of the Hellenic Police. While Greece has no federal government, the naming was adapted due to it being the first national investigative service of the country without a limited scope to specific types of crimes, like the Cyber Crime Directorate and the Counter-Terrorism Directorate. A more apt comparison would be the UK's National Crime Agency (NCA). ΔΑΟΕ collaborates with both of these services, as well as Europol, Interpol, the US Homeland Security Investigations (HSI) and other police services, both local and foreign in order to combat transnational Organized Crime. They also exchange intelligence with both the Hellenic Police's Intelligence Management and Analysis Directorate (ΔΙ.Δ.Α.Π. – Διεύθυνση Διαχείρισης και Ανάλυσης Πληροφοριών) as well as the National Intelligence Service of Greece (Ε.Υ.Π. - Εθνική Υπηρεσία Πληροφοριών).

The service employees an estimated ~1200 sworn Police Officers, including both investigators, as well as tactical personnel who aid the former in executing operations (e.g.: raids, stakeouts, search warrants, arrest warrants etc.).

== Mission and Responsibilities ==
Within its territorial jurisdiction, the Organized Crime Directorate (ΔΑΟΕ) exercises public security policing duties in relation to serious and organized crime, whether domestic or transborder in nature, as well as cases involving the activities of members of criminal organizations operating across wider areas encompassing one or more Regional Police Directorates.

More specifically, according to Presidential Decree 29/2024, the responsibilities of ΔΑΟΕ include:

- a) the dismantling of domestic or transborder criminal organizations;
- b) the investigation of money laundering arising from criminal activities, conducted in parallel with investigations into the main offences;
- c) the monitoring of developments and trends in serious and organized crime, whether domestic or transborder, as well as the study of scientific and technical methods for their prevention and suppression;
- d) cooperation with law enforcement authorities of other countries, through the Directorate of International Police Cooperation of the Hellenic Police Headquarters, for the exchange of knowledge, information and expertise in combating serious and organized crime;
- e) the provision of expertise and training to personnel of the respective Regional Police services for the more effective suppression of serious and organized crime;
- f) cooperation with other territorially competent services of the Hellenic Police and with other authorities and agencies, in particular the Independent Authority for Public Revenue (Ανεξάρτητη Αρχή Δημοσίων Εσόδων - Α.Α.Δ.Ε.), the National Transparency Authority (Εθνική Αρχή Διαφάνειας - Ε.Α.Δ.), the Authority for Combating Money Laundering (Αρχή Καταπολέμησης της Νομιμοποίησης Εσόδων από Εγκληματικές Δραστηριότητες), and the Financial Crime Prosecution Corps (Σώμα Δίωξης Οικονομικού Εγκλήματος - Σ.Δ.Ο.Ε.);
- g) cooperation with Europol, Interpol, and other competent authorities and services of Greece, European Union Member States, and third countries, within the framework of special agreements; and
- h) the utilization of intelligence and information from all services exercising public security policing duties.

== Structure ==
=== Directorate of Organized Crime (Director: Police Major General Photios Ntouitsis) ===
- Subdirectorate of Narcotics (Supervisor: Police Director Ioannis Karydakos)
  - General Investigations and International Cooperation Department
  - Cocaine Department
  - Heroin Department
  - Cannabis and Synthetic Drugs Department
  - Athens International Airport Narcotics Department
- Subdirectorate of Property Crimes and Crimes Against Life (Supervisor: Police Brig. Gen. Gregorios Zacharakis)
  - Crimes Against Life and Personal Freedom Department (colloquially known as Homicide Department)
  - Property Crimes Department
  - Extortion Crimes Department
- Subdirectorate of Human Trafficking and Illegal Items Trafficking (Supervisor: Police Director Photis Tzelepis)
  - Human Trafficking Department
  - Illegal Items Trafficking Department
  - National Cultural Heritage and Antiquities Protection Department
- Subdirectorate of Financial Crimes (Supervisor: Police Director Vasilios Plexidas)
  - Public Property and European Resources Protection Department
  - Private Property Protection Department
  - Economy Protection Department
  - Insurance Fraud Department
  - Tax Affairs Department
- Subdirectorate of Organized Athletic Violence (Supervisor: Police Brig. Gen. Konstantinos Christologlou)
  - Sports Games Protection Department
  - Special Investigations Department
  - Intelligence Department
- Subdirectorate of Intelligence and Operations (Supervisor: Police Brig. Gen. Theodoros Chronopoulos)
  - Intelligence Management and Strategy Analysis Department
    - Intelligence Management and Operational Analysis Office
    - Strategic Analysis Office
    - Intelligence Systems Office
  - Technical Applications Department
  - Witness Protection Department
  - Special Interrogations Department
  - Special Operational Units Department
    - Prevention and Mediation Units
- Subdirectorate of Administrative Support (Supervisor: Police Brig. Gen. Stavroula Pavlopoulou)
  - Budget Management Department
  - Inventory and Gear Management Department
  - Technical Support Department
  - Processing Department

=== Subdirectorate of Organized Crime of Northern Greece (Director: Police Director Aristidis Mintzas) ===
- Department of Narcotics
  - Cocaine Office
  - Heroin Office
  - Cannabis and Synthetic Drugs Office
  - Thessaloniki International Airport Narcotics Office
- Department of Property Crimes and Crimes Against Life
  - Crimes Against Life and Personal Freedom Office (colloquially known as Homicide Office)
  - Property Crimes Office
  - Extortion Crimes Office
- Department of Human Trafficking and Illegal Items Trafficking
  - Human Trafficking Office
  - Illegal Items Trafficking Office
  - National Cultural Heritage and Antiquities Protection Office
- Department of Financial Crimes
  - Public Property and European Resources Protection Office
  - Private Property Protection Office
  - Economy Protection Office
  - Insurance Fraud Office
  - Tax Affairs Office
- Department of Organized Athletic Violence
  - Sports Games Protection Office
  - Special Investigations Office
  - Intelligence Office
- Department of Intelligence and Operations
  - Intelligence Management and Strategy Analysis Office
  - Technical Applications Office
  - Special Operational Units Office
    - Prevention and Mediation Units
- Department of Administrative Support
  - Budget Management Office
  - Inventory and Gear Management Office
  - Technical Support Office
  - Processing Office

=== Subdirectorate of Organized Crime of Crete (Director: Police Deputy Director Emmanouil Piperakis) ===
- Department of Narcotics
- Department of Special Criminal Activities
  - Special Operational Units Office
- Department of Human Trafficking and Illegal Items Trafficking
- Department of Financial Crimes
- Department of Intelligence and Administrative Support
  - Intelligence Management Office
  - Technical Support Office

== History ==
Prior to the establishment of the Organized Crime Directorate, the primary responsibility for specialized investigations in the regions of Attica and Thessaloniki was exercised by the respective Security Directorates of those regions. These directorates comprised several Subdirectorates, including Narcotics; Property Crimes and Crimes Against Life; Human Trafficking and Organized Crime; Organized Athletic Violence; State Security and Extremist Violence; Juvenile Protection; Identity Documents and Archives; and Special Operations.

Although their statutory territorial jurisdiction was limited to Attica and Thessaloniki respectively, both Security Directorates frequently supported regional police services throughout Greece in cases of serious and organized crime falling within their areas of expertise.

In 2024, the Minister for Citizen Protection, Michalis Chrisochoidis, initiated a restructuring of these services, establishing a unified central service with nationwide jurisdiction in order to enhance coordination and improve the response to organized criminal activity, which often extends beyond regional boundaries. As part of this reform, the existing Directorate of Financial Crime — previously operating as a central investigative service alongside the Counter-Terrorism and Cyber Crime Directorates — was also incorporated into the newly established Organized Crime Directorate as one of its Subdirectorates.

Following the reform, the Security Directorates of Attica and Thessaloniki were renamed Crime Investigation and Prosecution Directorates and continued to operate with their remaining Subdirectorates, namely State Security and Extremist Violence, Juvenile Protection, Identity Documents and Archives, and Special Operations, albeit with a strictly regional mandate.

All local Crime Investigation and Prosecution Subdirectorates and Departments operating throughout Greece are now required to report their operational activity, findings, and intelligence to the Organized Crime Directorate and its two regional Subdirectorates. This framework is intended to support the centralized analysis and profiling of criminal activity, facilitate intelligence coordination, and enable the identification of broader criminal networks operating across multiple regions of the country, which was not possible under the previous structure of these Departments. A liaison officer in each Police Directorate links said Directorate to the relevant Organized Crime Service and all three of said Services retain authority to assume primary responsibility for investigations relating to Organized Crime in their geographic area of jurisdiction following prior communication with the director of the local Crime Investigation and Prosecution Subdirectorate/Department.

=== Organized Crime in Crete ===
The General Regional Police Directorate of Crete had previously maintained its own local Department of Organized Crime, established in response to persistent phenomena in the region such as vendetta-related homicides, large-scale illegal weapons possession and trafficking, livestock theft (rustling), and other forms of organized property crime, particularly in rural and mountainous areas. This department was subsequently incorporated into the Organized Crime Directorate and later upgraded to Subdirectorate status with specialized Departments, including a Department of Special Criminal Activities tasked with addressing forms of criminality particularly prevalent in the region. The reorganization followed the Vorizia double homicide in October 2025, which was linked to a long-standing vendetta in the town. The Special Criminal Activities Department also commands a Special Operational Units Office with 20 highly-trained officers, assigned to immediate deployment in case of similar incidents.

To further enhance operational readiness on the island, ever since 2001, six Departments of Police Operations (Τμήματα Αστυνομικών Επιχειρήσεων - Τ.Α.Ε.) have operated across Crete, each with defined geographic jurisdiction in predominantly rural and provincial areas. These Departments function as the rural equivalent of Ο.Π.Κ.Ε. (Ομάδες Πρόληψης και Καταστολής Εγκλήματος - Crime Suppression and Prevention Units), providing enhanced patrols, emergency tactical response, inspections related to narcotics and illegal firearms, targeted surveillance, and the execution of raids and arrest warrants. Administratively, they fall under the four Police Directorates of Crete (two in Heraklion, two in Rethymno, one in Chania and one in Lasithi). Operationally, however, they currently serve as the principal tactical support units of the new Subdirectorate of Organized Crime of Crete, fulfilling a role analogous to that of the Special Operational Units of the Organized Crime Services in Attica and Thessaloniki. From 2026 onwards, officers of the Τ.Α.Ε. undergo the same annual rigorous training as the Greek SWAT-equivalent, Ε.Κ.Α.Μ. (Ειδική Κατασταλτική Αντιτρομοκρατική Μονάδα - Special Suppressive Antiterrorist Unit).

=== Creation of Ο.Π.ΔΙ. ===
Ever since November 8, 2025, a new operational unit has been established within several Precincts of Attica, Thessaloniki and sixteen more Regional Units, designated as Prevention and Mediation Units (Ομάδες Πρόληψης και Διαμεσολάβησης – Ο.Π.ΔΙ.). Composed of 473 highly trained Police Officers, as well as 50 newly hired accredited Romani Mediators, these Units conduct foot and vehicle patrols on a 24-hour basis within Romani settlements across the country and conduct inspections and crime suppression operations. Their stated mission is the prevention of criminal activity, the strengthening of police presence within these areas, and the promotion of mediation and cooperation between Romani communities and the Hellenic Police. The Ο.Π.ΔΙ. Units fall under the Directorate of Organized Crime's Special Operational Taskforces Department and, outside of Attica and Thessaloniki, they are supervised by the Crime Investigation and Prosecution Subdirectorate of each Regional Unit.

== Notable Achievements ==
As of January 31st 2026, in 1 year and 4 months of operations, the Organized Crime Directorate managed to:

- Handle 958 criminal cases regarding serious and organized crime
- Dismantle 173 criminal organizations, of which 52 were related to Narcotics and 62 related to Property Crime
- Charged 3,312 individuals, 2,228 of which have already been to trial
- Resolve all Homicides that took place in the country
- Confiscate 5 tons of cannabis, 2 tons of cocaine, 116 kilograms of heroin, 36,000 pills of ecstasy, 25 tons of tobacco, 28,978,807 illegally smuggled tobacco cigarettes, 28,100 liters of illegally smuggled alcohol and a total of €7,275,573 derived from criminal activity
- Confiscate 427 pistols, 146 rifles, 62 hunting rifles, 47 revolvers, 27 air guns, 14 submachine guns, 9 machine guns and 60,266 bullets
- Confiscate 1,707 gold coins, 42 gold bars, 969 pieces of jewellery and 113 diamonds which had been stolen
