= Yannis Sakellarakis =

Greek archaeologist (1936–2010)

- Born: March 1936; Athens, Greece
- Died: October 28, 2010 (aged 73–74); Athens, Greece
- Known for: Excavation of Mt. Ida, Kythira, Archanes and Zominthos
- Scientific career
- Fields: Archaeology

Yannis A. Sakellarakis (Greek: Γιάννης Α. Σακελλαράκης; 1936 – October 28, 2010) was a Greek archaeologist who specialized in Minoan Prehistory.

== Career ==
Sakellarakis studied archaeology at the University of Athens (Dept of History and Archaeology) and later pursued graduate studies at Heidelberg University, where he was awarded a doctorate in 1969.

Sakellarakis taught at the Universities of Heidelberg, Hamburg and Athens. He served as the curator (1963–68) and then director (1980-87) of Heraklion Archaeological Museum in Crete and curator (1970–80) and later deputy director (1987–94) of the National Archaeological Museum in Athens. He excavated sites at Archanes, Kythira and Mount Ida.

Sakellarakis attracted international attention in 1979, when, while excavating the hill of Anemospilia in Archanes with his wife Efi Sapouna-Sakellaraki, he discovered evidence for human sacrifice by the Minoans. Another major discovery took place in 1982, when Sakellarakis unveiled a large, two-story Minoan building at Zominthos, a small plateau at an altitude around 1200 m in the northern foothills of Mount Ida (Psiloritis).

For his scientific achievements, Sakellarakis was awarded high honors and medals, including the Golden Cross of the Greek Order of Honour and the Gold Medal of the University of Crete. He was a member of the Academy of Athens and a corresponding member of the German Archaeological Institute and the Society of Antiquaries of London.

== Personal life ==
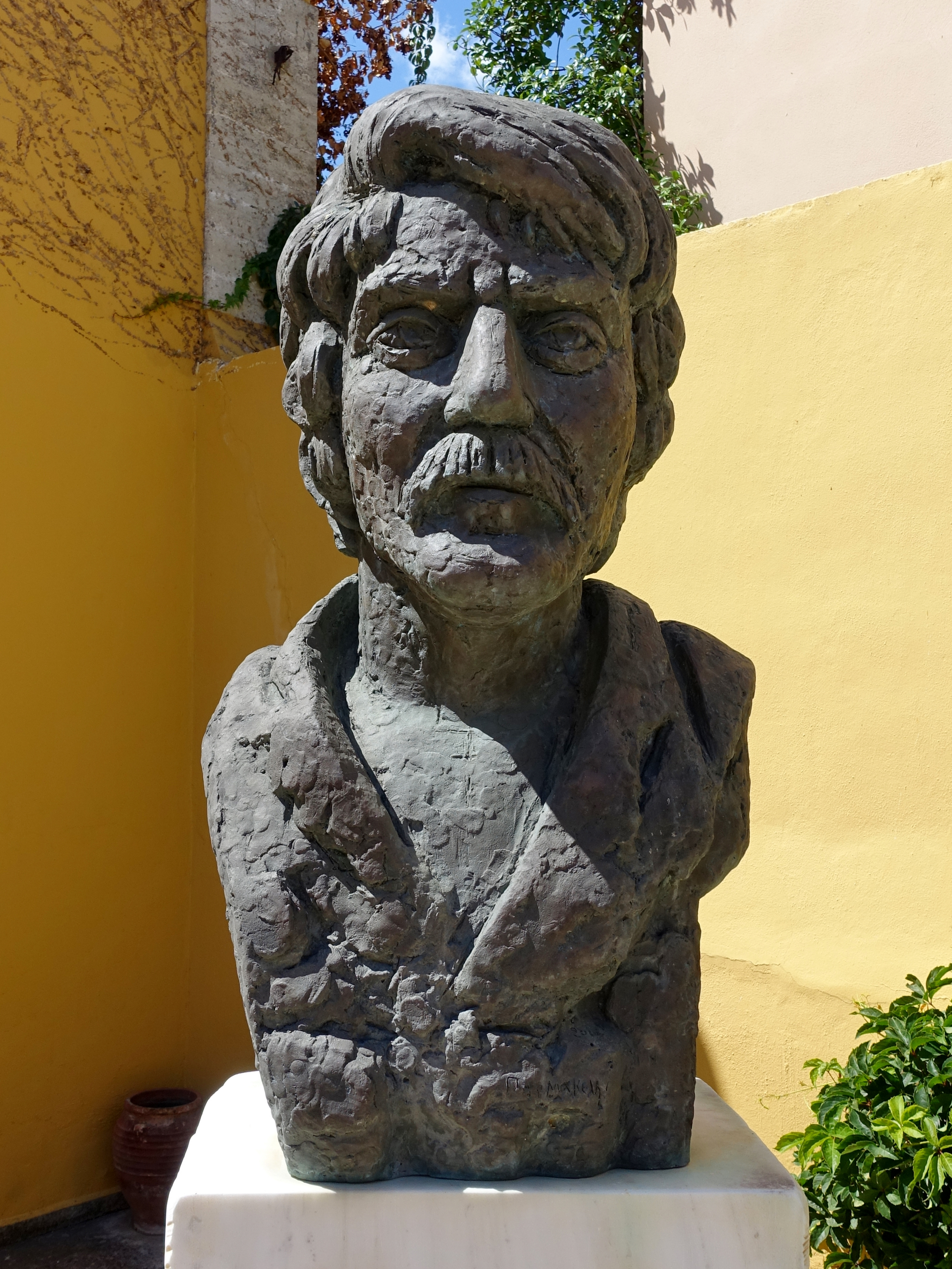
Bust of Yannis Sakellarakis

Despite not being a Cretan by birth, Sakellarakis became strongly bonded to the island of Crete and its people, considering himself a naturalized Cretan. Sakellarakis was married to his colleague and long time coworker Efi Sapouna-Sakellaraki.

== See also ==
- Zominthos
- Cave of Zeus
- Phourni
