= Archanes script =

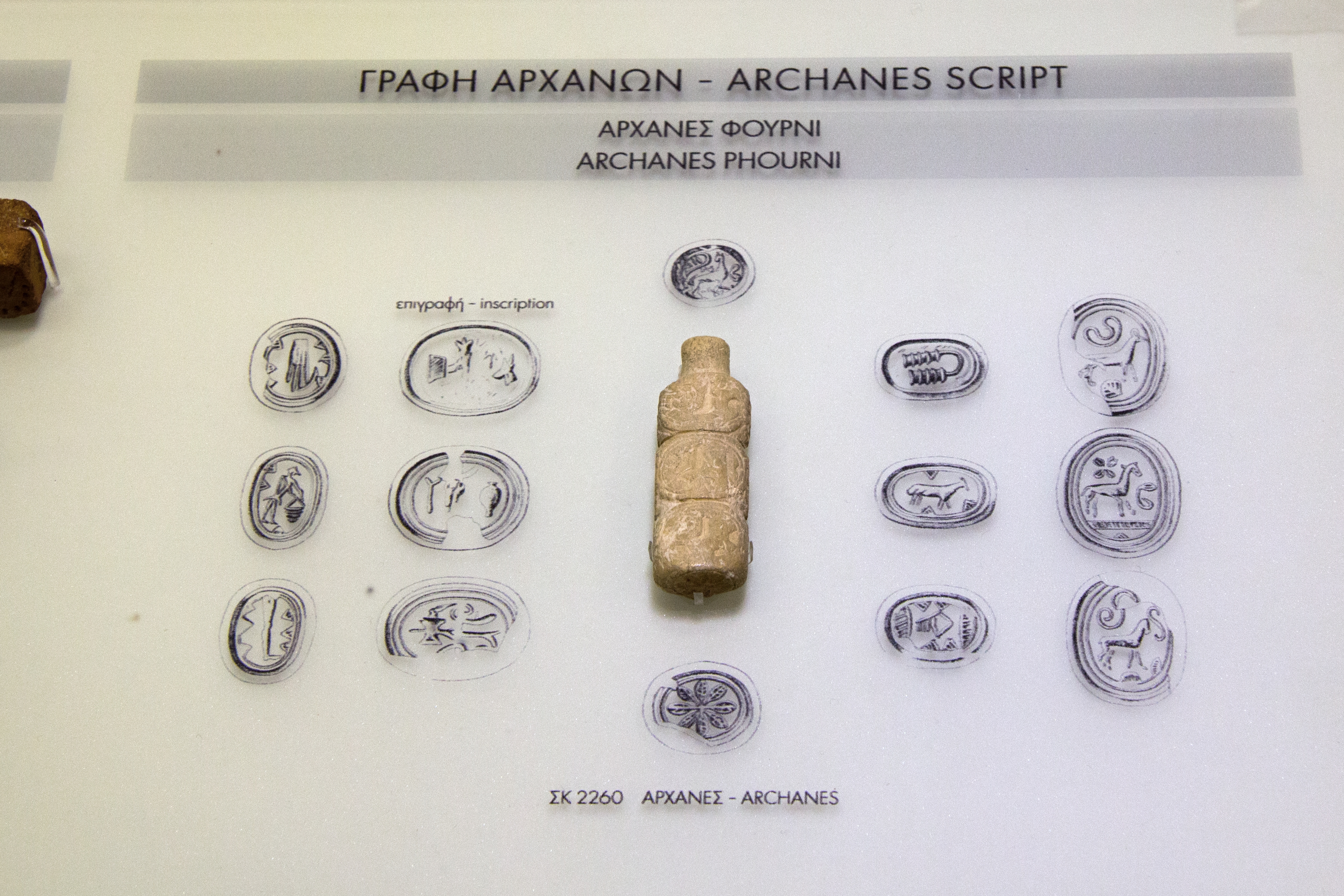
Drawings of seals with the Archanes script

The Archanes script is a (possible) writing system attested on seals first found at Archanes on Crete and on a few other archaeological sites. The writing system dates around 2200 to 1800 BC and is often regarded as the first European script.

== Discovery ==
First examples of the script were discovered in the 1960s at excavations at Archanes and appear on seals only. Paul Alan Yule who conducted a proper research and catalogue of early Minoan seals coined the term Archanes script, as he observed that on several seals from Archanes appear what might be called a script.

However, the nature of the script is under discussion as the number of seals with that script is very limited. Therefore the number of known signs is also very small. Some researchers see it as an early form of the Cretan hieroglyphs and regard it as a syllabic writing system. Some signs of the Archanes script appear in the Cretan hieroglyphs too. Other see these signs as decorative or just as symbols.
