= Zominthos =

Minoan archaeological site in Eastern Crete, Greece

Coordinates: 35°14′55.44″N 24°53′13.01″E

- Ζώμινθος (Greek)
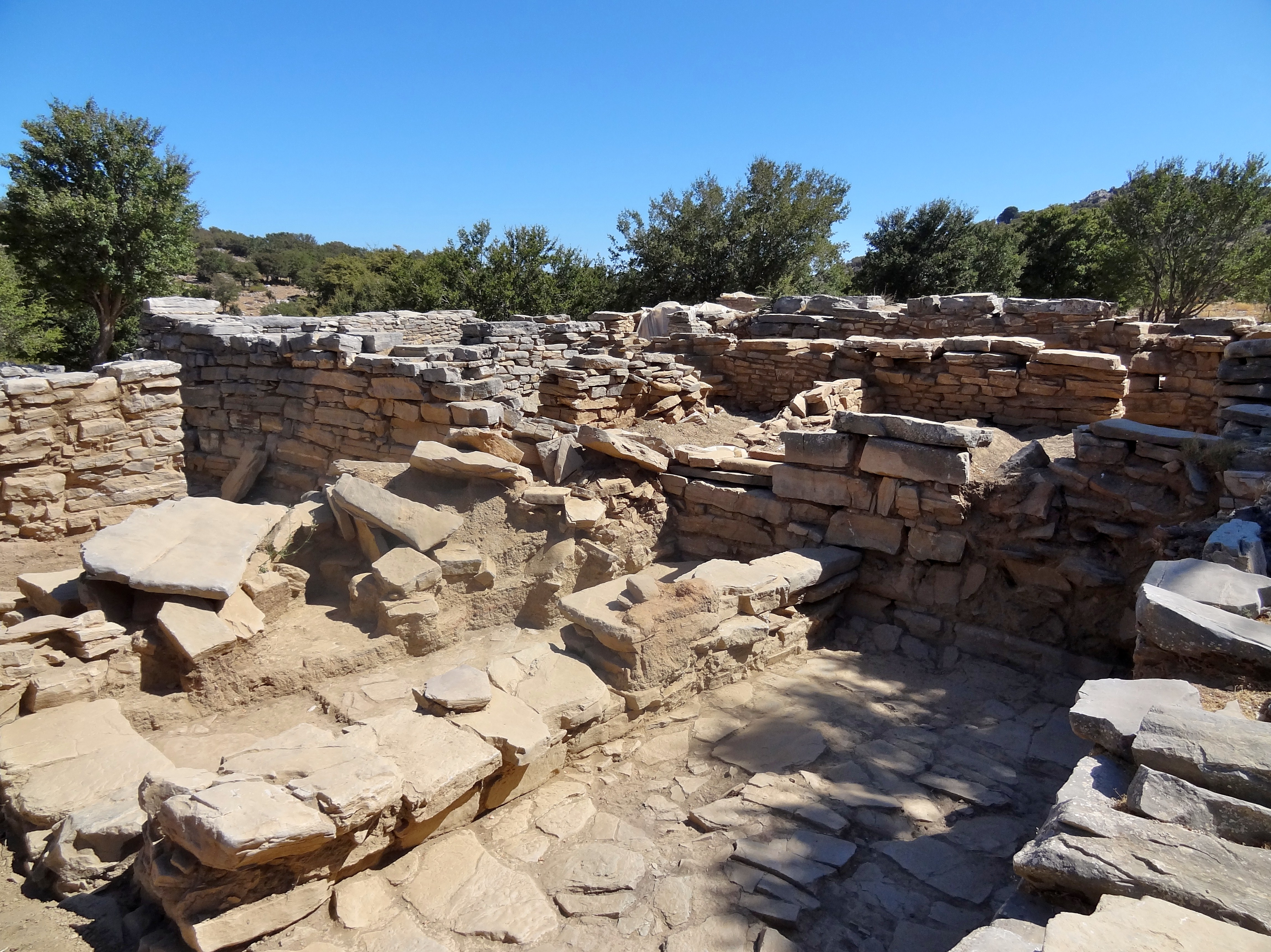
- Interactive map of Zominthos
- Type: Minoan building
- Cultures: Minoan
- Location: Mt Ida, Crete, Greece

Site notes
- Excavation dates: 1982, 2005-2007, 2010-
- Archaeologists: Yannis Sakellarakis, Diamantis Panagiotopoulos, Efi Sapouna-Sakellaraki
- Public access: Yes

UNESCO World Heritage Site
- Part of: Minoan Palatial Centres
- Criteria: Cultural: ii, iii, iv, vi
- Reference: 1733-003
- Inscription: 2025 (47th Session)

Zominthos (Greek: Ζώμινθος, alternative spellings Ζόμινθος or Ζόμιθος) is a small plateau in the northern foothills of Mount Ida (Psiloritis), on the island of Crete. Zominthos is roughly 7.5 kilometers west of the village of Anogia, on the path from Knossos to Idaion Antron, the great sanctuary cave near the peak of Ida. Zominthos is best known for the large Minoan building discovered there; signs of permanent settlement date back to about 1800 BC.

== Archaeology ==
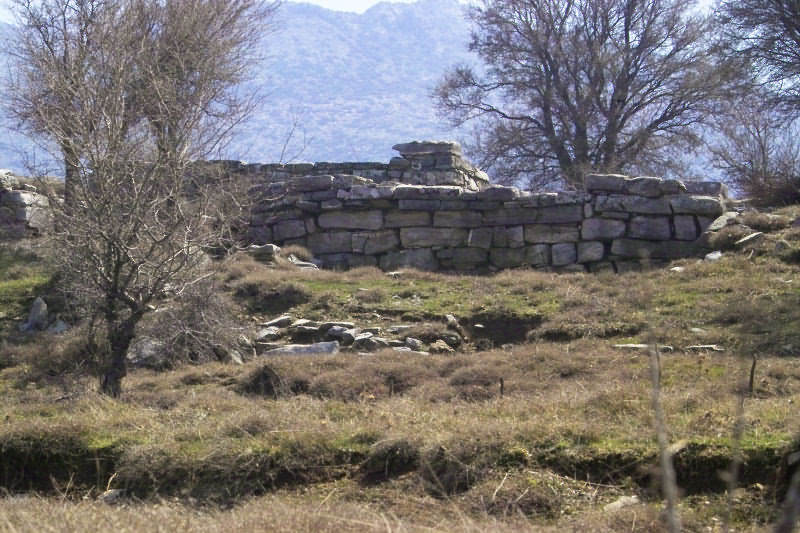
Zominthos ceramic workshop from the NW

In 1982, the Greek archaeologist Yannis Sakellarakis unveiled a large, two-story Minoan building at an altitude slightly below 1200m. The building's unusual size and careful construction, which incorporates some features pertinent only to palatial architecture, has attracted the interest of archaeologists. The significance of the discovery is emphasized even further by the fact that it lies considerably above the altitudinal limit of Minoan and modern Cretan settlements. Excavations have unearthed only a small part of the building and are still under way. However, they have made clear that the structure has been strongly built and is unusually well-preserved, with some of the remaining walls rising up to 3 meters in height. It has a strict north–south orientation and extends to at least 1350 m^{2}, with more than 100 rooms on the ground floor alone, some of which with frescoes. Unique to Minoan Crete is the discovery of a large pottery workshop. Equally important are the unearthed artefacts made from processed rock crystal.

The building belongs to the Neopalatial period and was abandoned after a big earthquake around 1600 BC. Archaeological research was conducted under the directions of Prof. Yannis Sakellarakis with the brief collaboration (2005-2007) of the University of Heidelberg (Prof Diamantis Panagiotopoulos). After the death of Yannis Sakellarakis in 2010 the excavation continues under the direction of Dr. Efi Sapouna-Sakellaraki.

In 2025, the site was designated as a World Heritage Site by UNESCO.
