= René Dussaud =

French archaeologist (1868–1958)

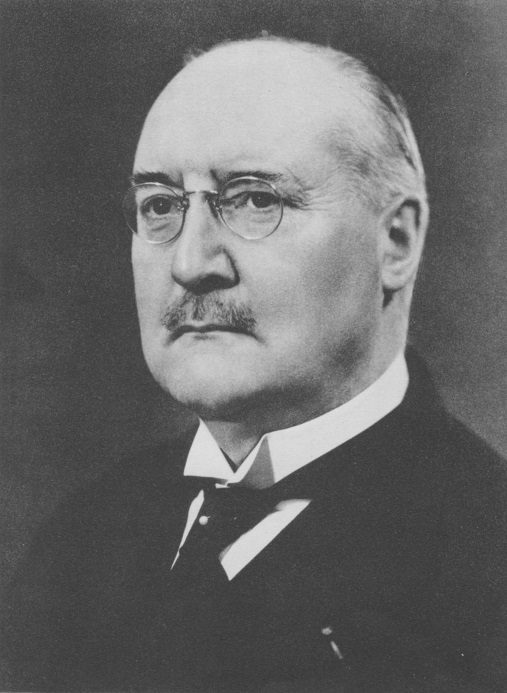
- Dussaud in c. 1920
- Born: Elie Pierre René Dussaud; 24 December 1868; Neuilly-sur-Seine, France
- Died: 17 March 1958 (aged 89); Neuilly-sur-Seine, France
- Occupations: University professor (1901–1937), Museum curator (1910–1938), Orientalist, Archaeologist and Epigrapher
- Employer(s): Louvre Museum (1910–1938), École du Louvre (1910–1937), Collège de France (1910–1938), Paris School of Anthropology (1901–1910)
- Organization(s): Académie des Inscriptions et Belles-Lettres (1923–1958), Royal Academy of Science, Letters and Fine Arts of Belgium, British Academy, Comité des travaux historiques et scientifiques, Arab Academy of Damascus
- Spouse: Valérie Guérin de Sauville

Signature
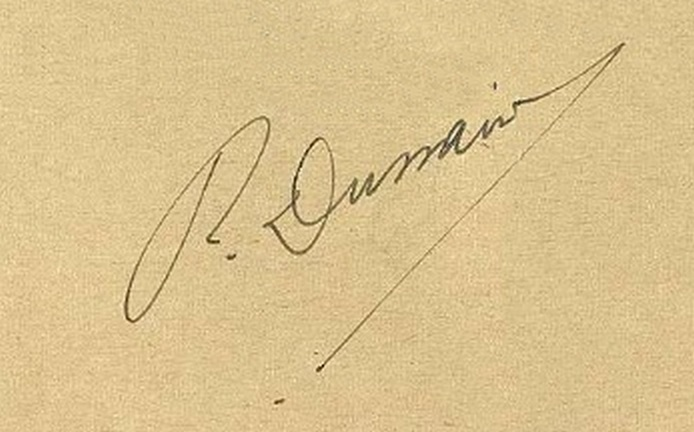

René Dussaud (French pronunciation: [ʁəne dyso]; December 24, 1868 – March 17, 1958) was a French Orientalist, archaeologist, and epigrapher. Among his major works are studies on the religion of the Hittites, the Hurrians, the Phoenicians and the Syriacs. He became curator of the Department of Near Eastern Antiquities at the Louvre Museum and a member of the Académie des Inscriptions et Belles-Lettres. One notable student was pioneering Jewish archaeologist Judith Marquet-Krause.

Dussaud is known for his support for the theory of the origin of the Semitic alphabet and for him being the leader of the French excavations in the Middle East and one of the founders of the archaeology journal Syria. He has been described as "a director of archaeological awareness".

== Glozel controversy ==
In the late 1920s and at the time René Dussaud was curator at the Louvre, the Glozel affair was a subject of heated controversy. Claude and Émile Fradin who made the discovery of an underground chamber in March 1924 were accused by Dussaud in December 1927 of forgery, after reports suggested that the site with the exception of some pieces was fake. The Fradins filed lawsuit for defamation against Dussaud in January 1928, and Dussaud was convicted of defamation in a trial in 1932.

== Bibliography ==
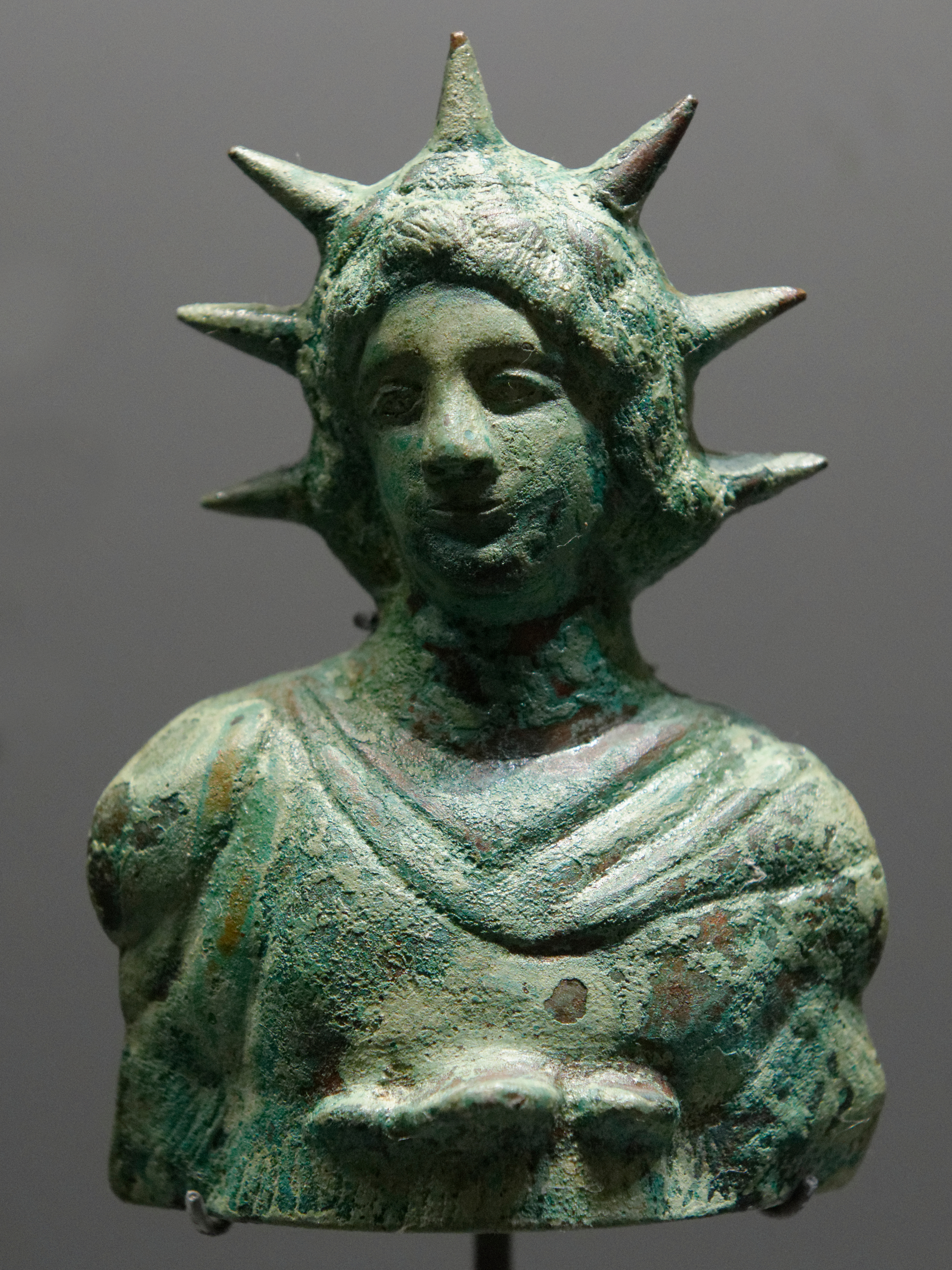
Bust of Helios found in Tripoli and donated by Dussaud to the Louvre Museum

René Dussaud's books include:

- La pénétration des Arabes en Syrie avant l'Islam. (Paris: Geuthner, 1955)
- Prélydiens hittites et achéens. (Paris: Geuthner, 1953)
- L'art phénicien du II^{e} millénaire. (Paris: Geuthner, 1949)
- Les religions des Hittites et des Hourrites des Phéniciens et des Syriens. (Paris: Presses Universitaires de France, 1945; together with Édouard Dhorme's book Les religions de Babylonie et d'Assyrie)
- Les découvertes de Ras Shamra (Ugarit) et l'Ancien Testament. (Paris: Geuthner, 1941)
- Mélanges syriens offerts à monsieur René Dussaud : secrétaire perpétuel de l'Académie des inscriptions et belles-lettres. (Paris: Geuthner, 1939)
- La Syrie antique et médiévale illustrée. (Paris: Geuthner, 1931)
- Topographie historique de la Syrie antique et médiévale. (Paris: Geuthner, 1927)
- Autour des Inscriptions de Glozel. (Paris: Geuthner, 1927)
- Les origines cananéennes du sacrifice israélite. (Paris: Geuthner, 1921)
- Le Cantique des cantiques : Essai de reconstitution des sources du poème à Salomon. (Paris: Geuthner, 1919)
- Introduction à l'histoire des religions. (Paris: Geuthner, 1914)
- Le Sacrifice en Israel et chez les Phéniciens. (Paris: Geuthner, 1914)
- Les civilisations préhelléniques dans le bassin de la mer Égée. (Paris: Geuthner, 1914)
- Conférences en 1912. (Paris, 1912)
- Les monuments Palestiniens et Judaïques (Moab, Judée, Philistie, Samarie, Galilée). (Paris, 1912)
- Les civilisations préhelléniques dans le bassin de la mer Égée : études de protohistoire orientale. (Paris: Geuthner, 1910)
- Les Arabes en Syrie avant l'Islam. (Paris, 1907)
- Voyage archéologique au Ṣafâ et dans le Djebel ed-Drûz. (Paris, 1901)
- Voyage archéologique au Ṣafâ et dans le Djebel ed-Druz. (Paris: Leroux, 1901)
- Histoire et religion des Nosairîs. (Paris: Bouillon, 1900)
