= Acharna =

Ancient town in central Crete, Greece

- Ἀχάρνα (Ancient Greek)
- Location within Greece
- 35°14′11″N 25°09′36″E
- Type: Town
- Periods: Archaic to Classical Greece (ca. 550–330 BC)
- Location: Archanes, Crete, Greece

Site notes
- Condition: Ruined
- Public access: Yes

Acharna or Akharna (Ancient Greek: Ἀχάρνα) was a town of ancient Crete, located near the necropolis of Fourni, identified in the modern town of Archanes (Modern Greek: Αρχάνες) in central Crete. The town is attested in sources from approximately 550 to 330 BC, corresponding to the Archaic and Classical periods of Greek history.

It's associated with Minoan palatial and sanctuary structures. The site is significant for its Minoan inscriptions, including hieroglyphic seals and the presence of sacred objects.
