= Édouard Paul Dhorme =

French assyriologist (1881–1966)

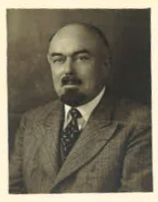
- Dhorme in Paris, about 1940
- Born: 15 January 1881; Armentières, Nord, France
- Died: 19 January 1966 (aged 85)
- Occupations: Assyriologist, Semitologist and translator of the Bible

Édouard Paul Dhorme (15 January 1881 in Armentières, Nord – 19 January 1966 in Roquebrune-Cap-Martin (Alpes-Maritimes)) was a French Assyriologist, Semitologist and translator of the Bible.

== Career ==
He was director of the French School of Biblical Archeology in Jerusalem from 1927 to 1930, and director of studies at École pratique des hautes études from 1933 to 1951, and a professor at Collège de France from 1945 to 1951. He was elected a member of the Académie des inscriptions et belles-lettres in 1948.

One of his greatest works treated of the religions of Babylon and Assyria. His French translation of the Old Testament was prepared under the direction of Gallimard at the Bibliothèque de la Pléiade. Along with Hans Bauer, Dhorme is credited with the decipherment of the Ugaritic writing system.

== Principal publications ==
- Études bibliques. Choix de textes religieux assyro-babyloniens, transcription, traduction, commentaire, Paris, 1907
- La Religion assyro-babylonienne : conférences données à l'Institut catholique de Paris, Paris, 1910
- Études bibliques : Les livres de Samuel, Paris, 1910
- L'emploi métaphorique des noms de parties du corps en hébreu et en akkadien, Paris, 1923.
- Études bibliques : Le livre de Job. Introduction, traduction et commentaire, Paris, 1926
- Langues et Écritures sémitiques, 1930
- La Poésie biblique. Introduction à la poésie biblique et trente chants de circonstance, Paris, 1931
- L'Evolution religieuse d'Israël. Tome I. La religion des Hébreux nomades, 1937
- Les Religions de Babylonie et d'Assyrie, suivi de Les Religions des Hittites et des Hourrites, des Phéniciens et des Syriens par René Dussaud, 1945 ; 1949
- Recueil Édouard Dhorme : études bibliques et orientales, Paris : Impr. Nationale, 1951
- La Bible, Paris : Gallimard, 1956
- A Commentary on the Book of Job(translation into English and preface by Francis I. Andersen - Nelson 1983)

== Bibliography ==
- Agnès Spycket, « Les Archives d'Édouard Dhorme (1881-1966) à la bibliothèque du Saulchoir » in Revue Biblique, 104:1 (1997): 5-39. Palmyrean and Syriac.
- Biographie d'Édouard Dhorme sur le site Persée

== Connected Articles ==
- Marie-Joseph Lagrange
- René Dussaud
- Jean Bottéro
