= Anemospilia =

Archaeological site in Crete, Greece

Coordinates: 35°15′19.6″N 25°08′40.3″E

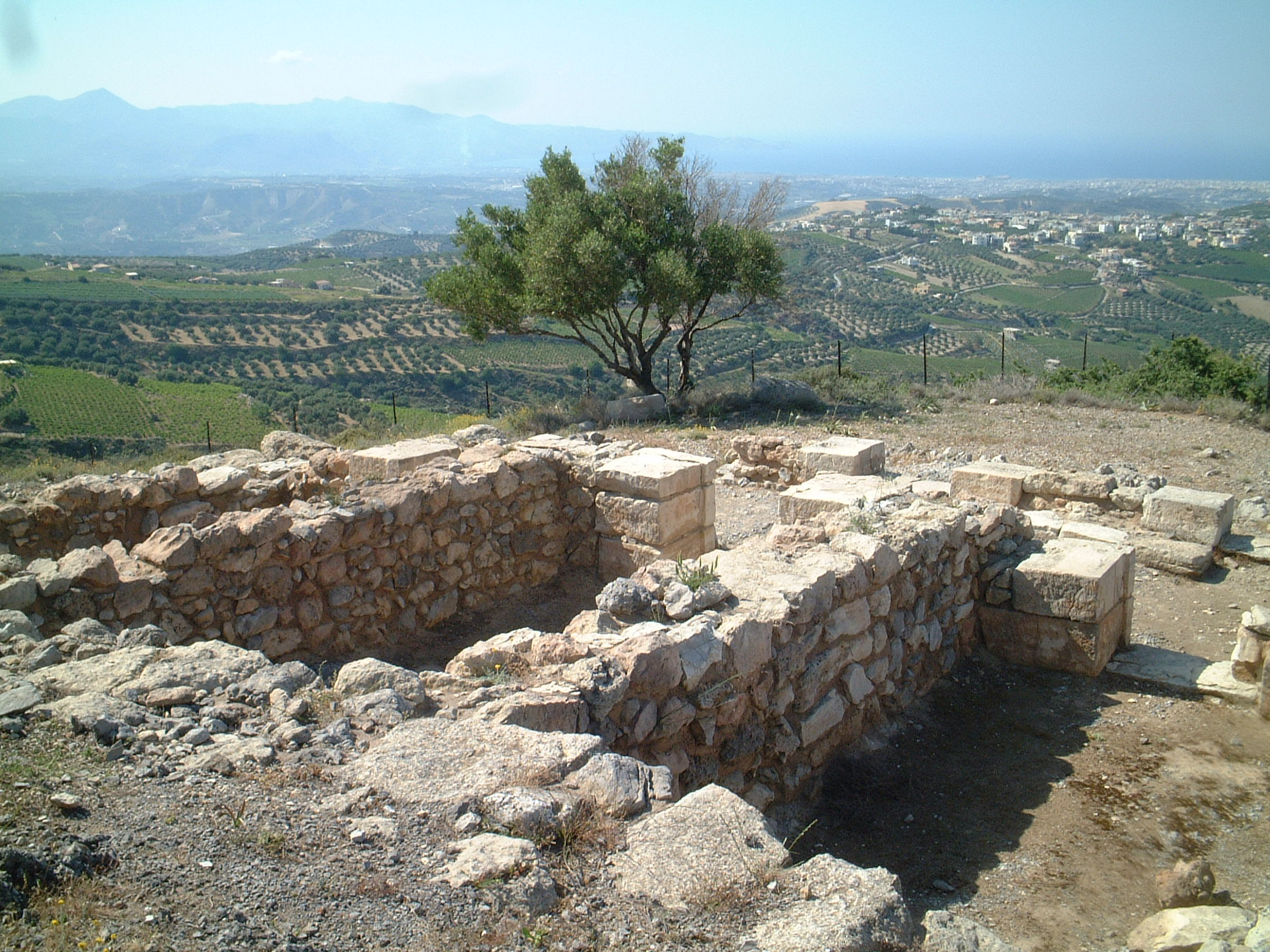
View of Anemospilia from the south.

Anemospilia (Greek: τα Ανεμόσπηλια) is the archaeological site of an ancient Minoan temple on Crete.

== Geography ==
The temple is located on the northern end of Mount Juktas. Modern Heraklion can be seen from the site. The site is in the country side near Arkhanes, about 7 kilometers from Knossos on the Island of Crete. It was on a hillside facing north towards the palace complexes of Knossos. Various factors made archaeologists conclude that it was a temple. The site is in the countryside, Anemospilia means 'caves of the wind'. It is in the foothills of Mount Juktas, the legendary burial place of Zeus.

== Archaeology ==
Anemospilia was first excavated in 1979 by the Greek archaeologist Yannis Sakellarakis. The temple was destroyed by earthquake and fire around 1700 BC, about the same time as the destruction of the first palaces. The temple was found in a ruined state with stone walls only reaching hip height. Traces of ash and charcoal were found on the ground, and from this, one can postulate that the building was burnt down.

Finds excavated from Anemospilia are at the Heraklion Archaeological Museum.

The temple is set out with three chambers and one annex that leads into them, each chamber has something somewhat unusual about them inside it.

=== East chamber ===
In the east chamber, ruins of a stepped altar were found on the Southside of the room, and on it were many offerings. There were the remains of many vessels of pottery (pithoi) found on the floor, and traces of milk, honey, grains, and peas were found in the bottom of the jars. When the pottery vessels were reconstructed, the scene carved into some of the pottery shows a religious ritual.

=== Annex ===
In the annex, a body was found, whose bones were so smashed, especially the pelvic bones, that it was impossible for anyone to identify the gender of the body, showing that the corpse had a boulder or rock dropped onto it. Around the body were fragments of smashed pottery. The position of the body indicates that the person was running from the central chamber at the time of death.

=== Central chamber ===
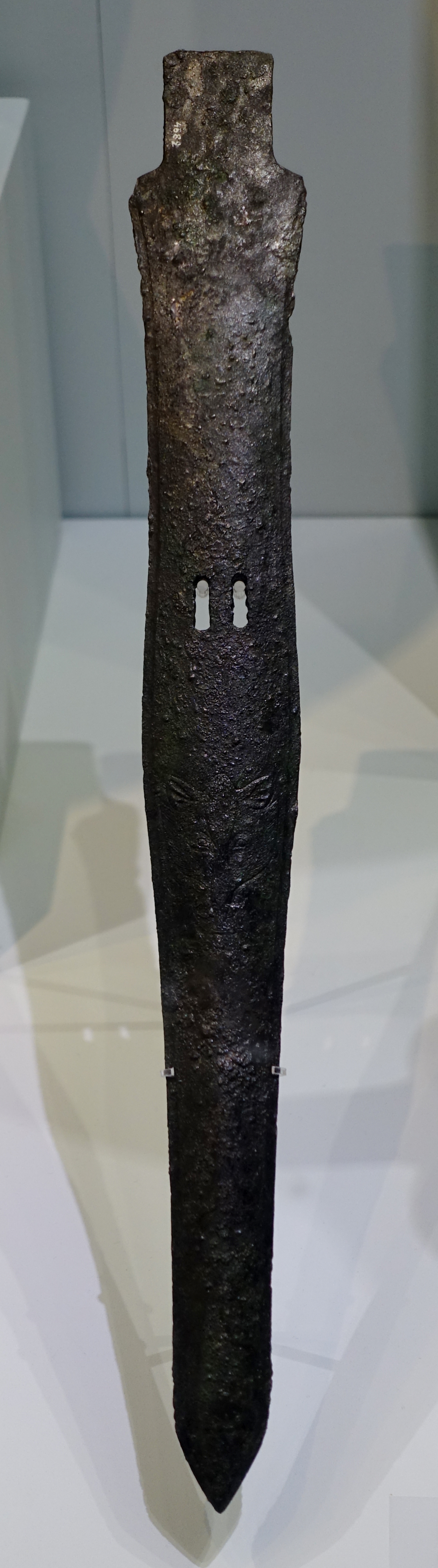
The "dagger", or spearhead, now in AMH

In the central chamber, an altar of the south side of the room was found, made from the hewn rock of the sacred hillside. On it stood a pair of clay feet that had been the idol's base, as well as bits of burnt wood. The idol, or Xoanon (Greek for statue), would have been life-sized and predominantly made of wood, and the ash on the ground suggests that it was burned when the temple was. At the base of the altar were found the remains of more than 400 pottery vessels. Close to the Xoanon there was a mound, a piece of hillside rock, a symbol of the earth, which, along with the sea and the sky, the Minoans considered to be the eternal elements of the world. The sacred stone had been an important part in rituals, for over it libations were poured to the deity.

=== Western chamber ===
In the western chamber, two skeletons were found on the floor, one in the south west corner of the room This body was of a 28-year-old female. She could have been a high priestess of some sort.

The other skeleton was that of a male, he was aged in his late thirties, and 183 cm (6 ft.) tall, and powerfully built, he was lying on his back with his hands covering his face, as if to protect it. The tall man had a ring made of iron and silver on the little finger of his left hand and on his wrist was an engraved seal of “exceptional artistic merit”, this would have obviously been very valuable. His legs were broken and his body was found near the centre of the room next to a platform, at the base of the platform was a trough.

On top of the platform another body was found. This was a body of an 18-year-old male; he was found in the foetal position, lying on his right side. His legs were forced back so that his heels were almost touching his thigh, indicating that they were tied there. Amongst the bones was found an ornately engraved knife, it was 40 cm (16 in.) long and weighing more than 400g (14 oz.). Each side of the blade had an incised rendering of an animal head, the snout and tusks of a boar, ears like butterfly wings and slanted eyes like a fox.

=== Debate over human sacrifice ===
Although many still believe that there is substantial evidence for the site being used for the sacrificing of humans, some archaeologists follow the thinking of Dennis Hughes, who points out that the "knife" is actually much more like an ornate spear head that probably fell from the shelves above onto the body, and that there is no evidence at all for the platform that he lies on being an altar.
