= Troullos =

Ancient Minoan settlement on Crete

Troullos, also known as Trullos, is the archaeological site of an ancient Minoan settlement on Crete. The Troullos site is the easternmost section of the ancient settlement at Archanes.

== Archaeology ==
Trullos was first excavated by Sir Arthur Evans, later by Spyridon Marinatos and most recently by J. and E. Sakellarakis. The site was in use from Middle Minoan II until late Minoan I.

=== Architecture ===
- Paved courtyards
- Middle Minoan II, Middle Minoan III and Late Minoan I multiple-storeyed buildings
- Late Minoan I house, including a light-well
- Clay-brick partition walls (building internals)
- Ashlar walls (building internals)
- Wall-paintings on plaster

=== Artifacts ===
Among the movable artifacts at Troullos:

- Polychrome Kamares ware
- Terracotta figurines
- Tripod offering tables
- Beak-spouted jugs
- The Archanes Ladle, a translucent alabaster ladle with Linear A inscriptions labelled TLZa1 by Godart and Olivier - discovered by Evans and believed to be from within Middle Minoan III-Late Minoan IA (A stunning photograph of this piece is available in Sakellarakis' guidebook to Archanes)
- Marble pestles
- Ritual steatite axe
- Stone bird's nest vases
- Porphyrite conical rhyton
- Two bull's head rhytons
