= Synoikia =

Ancient Greek festival held in Athens

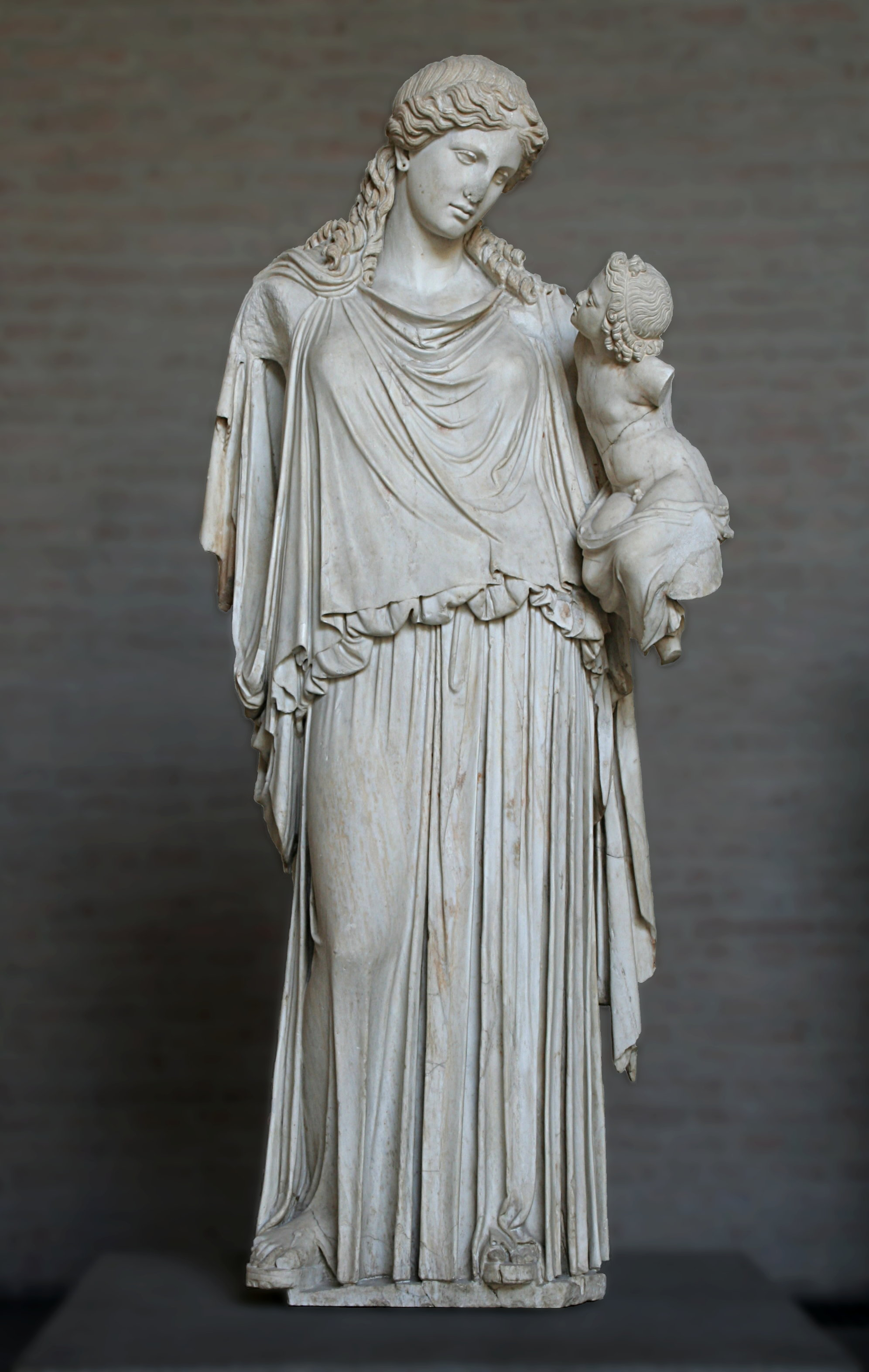
Eirene (Peace) bearing Plutus (Wealth), Roman copy after a Greek votive statue by Kephisodotos (ca. 370 BC) which stood on the agora in Athens.

The Synoikia (Greek: συνοικία) was an ancient Greek festival held in Athens commemorating the political unification of Attica. It was also called the Thesean Synoikismos and the Feast of Union, and celebrated Theseus as founder of Athens and the goddess Athena as the city's patron goddess. The festival was celebrated in the month of Hekatombeion on the 16th. A two-day festival, on the 15th and the 16th was held every second year.

The name of the festival comes from the word synoecism (or synoikismos, Greek: συνοικισμός), which means the merging of smaller communities into one larger community. Athenian myth recorded two synoecisms: first the establishment by King Cecrops of the original twelve cities of Attica, and then merger of these twelve cities into a single Athenian state by the mythological King Theseus, with its political centre in Athens. The Synoikia festival celebrated this act of Theseus.

During the festival, ewes and bullocks were sacrificed to Zeus Phratrios (of Brotherhood). The festival was organised and paid for by the phylobasileis, representatives of the original four Athenian tribes, which had otherwise fallen out of use after the reforms of Cleisthenes in 508 BC.

After the Athenian victory over the Persians in the first Greco-Persian War and the subsequent rebuilding and resettling of the city-state, the Synoikia festival became even grander than before. Athena and Theseus, known as the "divine and heroic patrons" of the city, were glorified and worshipped more vigorously. These two figures became linked with one another, and rituals and rites that were once attributed to only one of these figures became intertwined between these two characters. Some “Thesean elements [from] festivals…[were] infused with ceremonies belonging to [Athena, and vice versa]... even those not connected with the Synoikia.” In 374 BC, in honour of a short-lived armistice during the Boeotian War, the Athenians added a “bloodless” sacrifice to Eirene, the goddess of peace.

While this festival was celebrated by the Athenians, there were not many indications that showed that the other demes in Attica, outside of Athens, held Synoikia. This festival is not present in either the Marathonian and Erchian calendrical inscriptions — where the Marathonian calendar was for the Marathon Tetrapolis (consisting of the demes Marathon, Oinoe, Probalinthos, and Trikorynthos), and the Erchian calendar was for the deme of Erchia.

== See also ==
- Athenian festivals
