= Vathypetro =

Archaeological site on Crete

Coordinates: 35.2097°N 25.1508°E

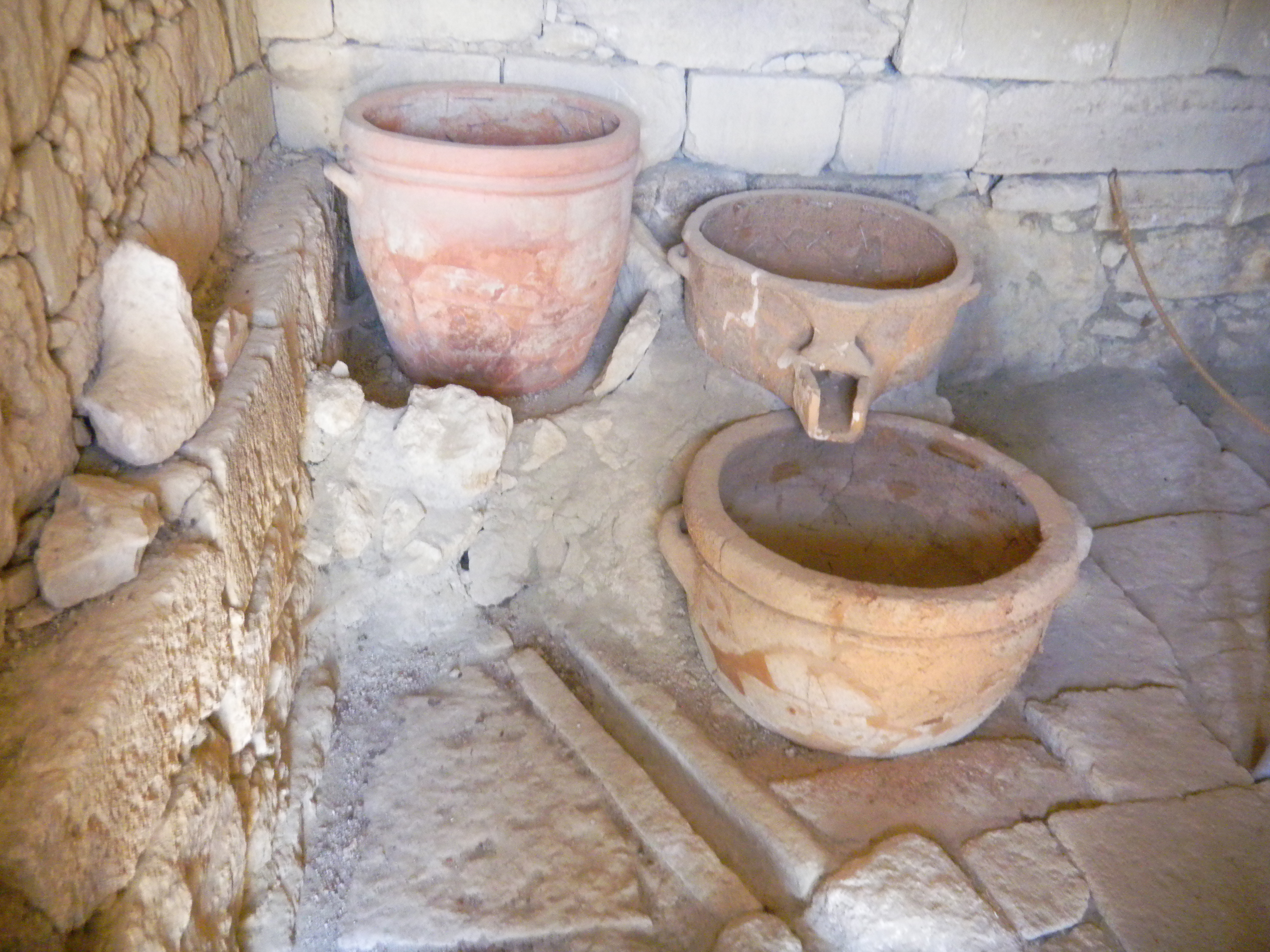
Vathypetro archaeological site, Crete, Greece

Vathypetro (Greek: Βαθύπετρο) is an archaeological site, four kilometres (2.5 mi) south of the town of Archanes on Crete (Greece). It contains some of the oldest wine presses in the world.

== Overview ==
Excavations by the Greek archaeologist Spyridon Marinatos began in 1949. The estate contains a manor house or villa which had a prominent role in the rural region around Archanes. The complex consists of several buildings, courtyards and workshop spaces. Next to the individual houses is the Minoan wine press, a factory for processing olives, a Minoan kiln and ceramics, and the remains of an ancient pottery workshop.
