= Synoecism =

Joining of Ancient Greek villages into poleis

Ancient Greek Synoecism συνοίκια/συνοικισμός
- Formation of or significant changes to an ancient Greek polis
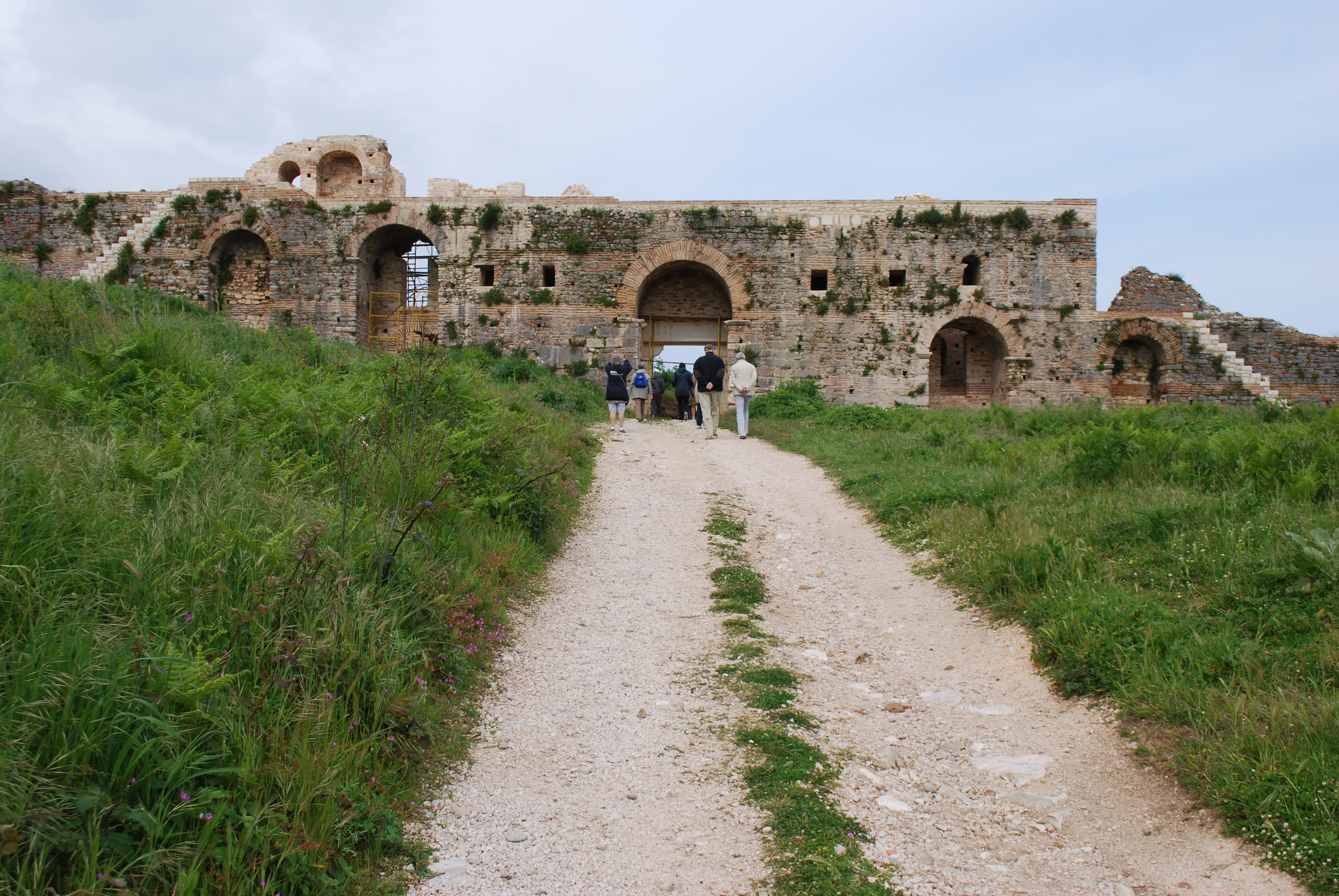
- Western gate of Nicopolis, an example of a new polis created by the synoecism of a number of others, which were left abandoned; i.e., Augustus relocated the populations of the surrounding poleis into a new central polis called "Victory City" to commemorate the naval battle of Actium in 31 BC. The reasons were undoubtedly economic, as the new polis brought great prosperity into the area.
- Etymology: "same house"
- Communities participating in the synoecism of Nikopolis and the boundaries of the territory

Government
  - Type: Establishes or modifies a Republic, or commonwealth. which has home rule, even though possibly politically dependent on another body to some degree.

Synoecism or synecism (/sɪˈniːsɪzəm/ si-NEE-siz-əm; Ancient Greek: συνοικισμóς, sunoikismos, Ancient Greek: [syːnɔi̯kismós]), also spelled synoikism (/sɪˈnɔɪkɪzəm/ si-NOY-kiz-əm), was originally the amalgamation of villages in Ancient Greece into poleis, or city-states. Etymologically, the word means "dwelling together (syn) in the same house (oikos)." Subsequently, any act of civic union between polities of any size was described by the word synoikismos, in addition to the Latinized synoecism. Synoecism is opposed to Greek dioecism (διοικισμóς, dioikismos), the creation of independent communities within the territory of a polis.

Synoecism is the result of a few major factors, mainly an increase in population density of adjacent settlements, with an incorporation proposed for economic, political or ideological advantages, such as the synoecism of the communities of Attica into Athens, or by imposition of a ruling power, such as the synoecism of Messenia into the newly built city of Messene. Additionally, synoecism may be the result of less active forces which often take the form of shared cultural elements such as religion or language.

Although there were differences between synoecism in ancient Greece and ancient Rome, the same general concept is deduced from the history of both civilizations. Before political union, the future (combined) population of the polity constituted smaller settlements that were not obligated to each other, or at least not by the contract that was later to institute their political union. A settlement or group of settlements might be constituents of another polity from which they would be annexed or transferred.

== Classical Greece ==
=== Development ===
In ancient Greece, society was divided into the demos (δῆμοι, κῶμαι; "country people" or "country villages") and the "asty" (ἄστυ) or "polis" (πόλις). The polis was the situs of the princely nobility, gentry, and aristocracy and the sacerdotal and martial families. The distinction between the "demos" and the "polis" was politically very important in these ancient states. There was much antagonism between the two bodies of the country and city. Where commerce and trade came to dominate culture and ideology, they encouraged men to live together in larger towns and develop democracies. In the city states of classical Greece, synoecism occurred when the "demos" combined with and subordinated, usually by force, the "politiea" in one polity.

In the poleis, the synoikistes was the person who according to tradition executed the synoecism, either by charisma or outright conquest; he was subsequently worshiped as a demi-god. Often, the synoikistes executed the synoecism in the interest of consolidating political power for themselves.

==== Theseus ====
The most famous synoikistes was the mythic and legendary Theseus, who liberated Attica from Cretan hegemony and restored the independence of Greece under the leadership of Athens. In doing so, Theseus effectively consolidated the power of several loosely related minor city-states residing in the countryside for himself by eliminating local government which took the form of small city councils and magistracies. According to Thucydides, Theseus founded a new central Prytaneion, an important building with governing administrative duties, in Athens as well as a host of other buildings with both administrative and religious duties in order to create a unified state. Thucydides also attributes Theseus with the "Synoecia" which translates to "Feast of Union."

Koen Van Gelder recognizes that modern scholars generally disagree with this traditional foundation of Athens due to a variety of inaccuracies such as when it occurred or whether synoecism was the result of political intentions or cultural ones. The physical records of Attica and Athens have left many elements of the Theseus origin of Athens unreconcilable.

Thomas has adduced arguments in support of the unity of the territory of Attica by the end of the Mycenaean period. Although her arguments seem convincing to me, they do not furnish absolute proof of a Bronze Age synoikismos; however, a political unification must have preceded the physical synoikismos at the end of the Bronze Age, or resulted from it, so that, on the threshold of the Iron Age, Athens was the only state in Attica. O. Broneer's reflection on the large quantities of lead found in the Mycenaean fountain on the Acropolis and the Athenian hold of the Laurium must also be taking into consideration.

==== Aristotle ====
In Aristotle's Politics, synoecism was initiated via the community. Communities would come together in order to consolidate power and legalize and enforce these shared notions of what is acceptable and what is not. To Aristotle, synoecism is what drives civilization to form governments. It begins as the union between a man and woman who create a household. Households, in turn, seek out larger networks of other connected households until the community reaches a point at which it can sustain itself in order to facilitate the enforcement of a collective good. The synoecism of Greek individuals into households, towns, and larger communities ensures a level of stability which is afforded to those who participate in the union. It is through the synoecism, according to Aristotle, that the Greeks are able to differentiate themselves from outsiders who are otherwise considered barbarians. Politics professes a fundamental belief that without the laws and justice synoecism provides, mankind is just another animal. Prevalent in Aristotle's Politics is the concept of communal strength. Greeks on their own are considered to be weaker than if they were to act as a whole. They are vulnerable to floods and famines as well as diseases to wiping out their singular contributions to the Greek world. As a state, Greeks are instead able to produce and create above their individual ceilings.

=== Culture ===
Prior to synoecism, the people in the Greek mainland consistently shared similar ideologies and cultural beliefs. It is notable that the Greeks possessed a shared system of writing both archaically and classically which aided separate and distinguishable villages in forming larger cohesive polities. Works like Homer's Iliad and Odyssey describe a historically united Greek front against foreigners in Anatolia and were likewise admired and celebrated universally by the Greeks. Homer's Iliad even provides a historical precedent for the unity of certain Greek polities.

Clan after clan poured out from the ships and huts onto the plain... innumerable as the leaves and blossoms in their season... the Athenians from their splendid citadel,... the citizens of Argos and Tiryns of the Great Walls... troops... from the great stronghold of Mycenae, from wealthy Corinth,... from Knossos,... Phaistos,... and other troops that had their homes in Crete of the Hundred Towns.

There is a historical literary precedent for Greek synoecism before many of the developments in democracy or oligarchy take place in the 5th thought the 3rd century delineating the Kyklos of archaic Greece.

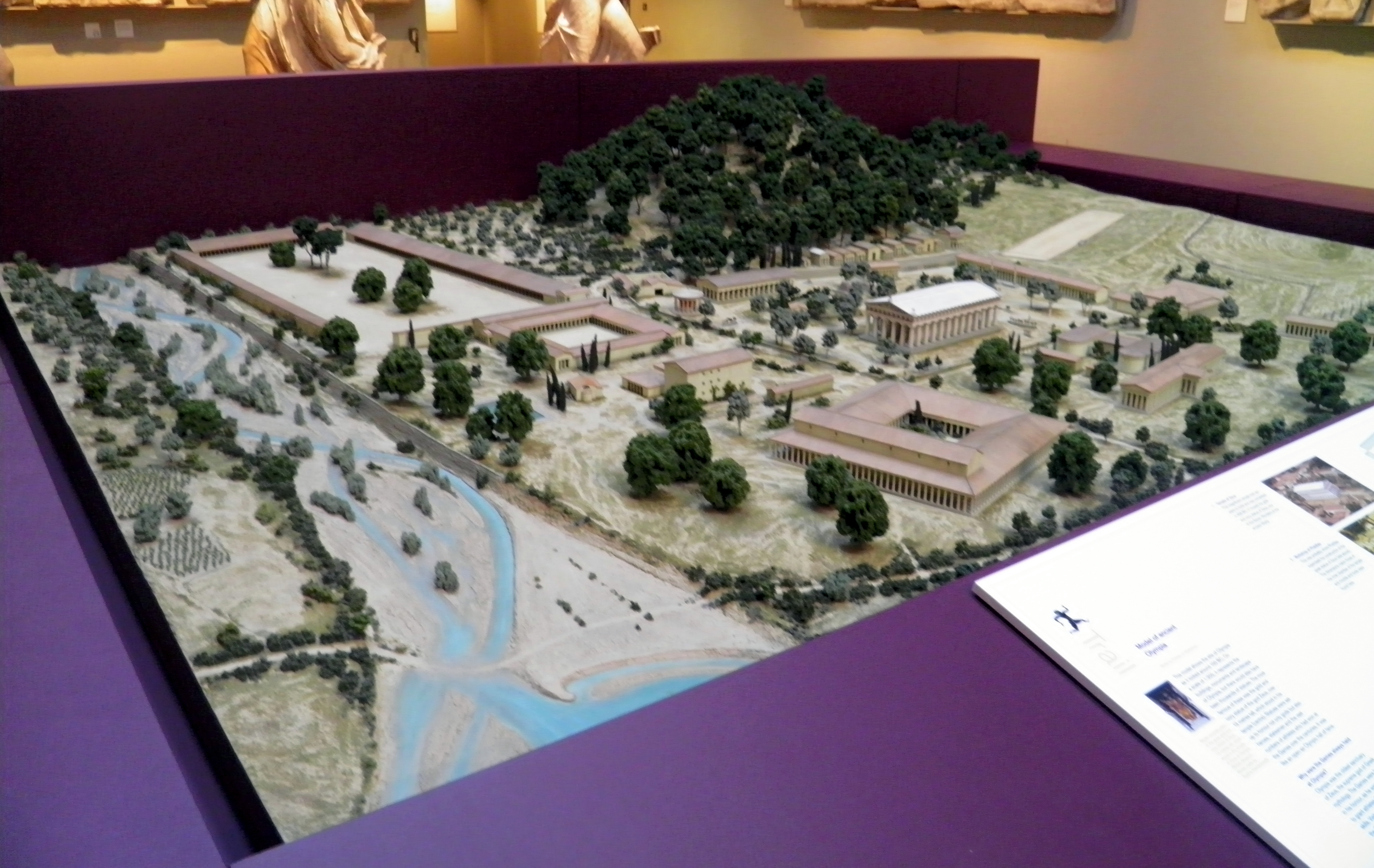
1980 recreation of ancient Olympia housed in the British Museum.

==== Festivals ====
Among the ancient Greeks, festivals represented opportunities to continue synoecism as well as reform or reinforce it. Festivals provided central locations to the numerous and scattered Greek city states at which information could be exchanged and social relationships maintained. The Olympics, being perhaps the largest example of synoecismatic festivals, were a pan-Hellenistic contest under which attracted Greeks at an international scale. At the games, Greeks would recognize basic similarities between themselves and other city-states through their shared enjoyment of the competitions which contributed to broader notions of synoecism through athletic representation of city-states. Individual athletes would gain notoriety and recognition for winning events for their cities. Theoretically, higher levels of visibility for city-states would grant increasing opportunities to expand sovereignty and establish themselves as real political units. Olympic truces are evidence of this effect. If one city-state were to invade or go to war with another city-state during an Olympic truce, the aggressor would not be allowed into the games. Therefore, having an athlete representative in the games meant a recognition of a city-states own sovereignty on a pan-Hellenistic scale.

==== Religion ====
In Aristotle's Politics a responsibility of the polis is its reverence to the gods. Due to this, many religious roles were in fact elected offices and responsibilities of the deme as a whole. Successful synoecism can also be attributed to proper integration of new or reformed state religion. In 408-407 BCE the synoecism of the cities of Lindos, Ialysus, and Camirus formed the new Rhodian state. The synoecism is reflected in the selection of their eponymous priest as they were chosen from the demes of the three collective states now composing Rhodes. It is from the annual election of said priests that the synoecism of the Rhodian state can be dated precisely.

=== Oligarchies ===
Ancient Greek states not democratically governed used the word "polis" in their public documents to signify sovereign power. The Doric states of Crete and Sparta preserved the polis separate from the demos. As late as the second century AD, Cretan towns continued to denote themselves with "polis". Sparta, however, deviating from this use of the word, denominated itself "damos" (δᾶμoς) in ancient laws, because it never thought of itself as a body opposed to the Perioeci.

Müller states: "In oligarchical states, as in Elis, the people in later times remained almost constantly in the country; and it frequently happened that grandfathers and grandchildren had never seen the town: there were also country courts of justice, and other regulations intended to make up for the advantages of a city life. Where the courts of justice were at a distance, and there was no inducement to mechanical industry and internal commerce (see the term banausos), the ancient habits of life continued much longer in existence."

Sometime in the early 360's BCE the city of Megalopolis, located in Arkadia, was founded in order to coordinate a confederacy of city-states against Spartan hegemony in the region. In an effort to politically unite manage the different confederate city-state members, a council of ten oikistes was appointed to rule in the city. This inter-city effort represents a synoecism between the communities of the region into the poleis of Megalopolis with the intention of centralizing political authority.

=== Democracies ===
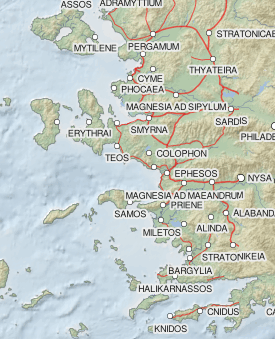
Map of Ionia, what is now the western coast of Turkey.

Popular government was first established in the wealthy and populous Greek cities in Ionia. From this history the word and concept of "democracy" is derived. This synoecism was one of the primary causes of the Kyklos in ancient Hellas. Synoecism also occurred at Mantineia: in the fifth century, after its synoecism, it became a democracy; in the fourth century, it was again divided ("dioikismos") and an oligarchy formed. Later, more political upheaval caused another synoecism, thus instituting another democracy. This further occurred in the other Arcadian towns of Tegea and Heraia.

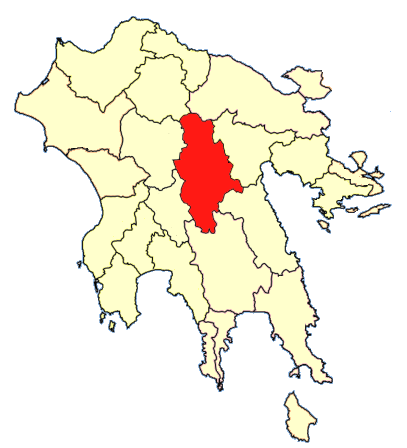
Location of Mantineia on the mainland of Greece.

In ancient Athens, the villages of Attica combined with the polis of Athens; consequently the "demos" and "polis" became identical in Athens and the former word assumed preference to denote the whole polity. A four tiered class system outlined by Solon on the basis of income either by the way of monetary wealth, agricultural production or otherwise was introduced in the 6th century as a way of distinguishing between citizens and the rest of the population. These four classes were again transformed under Kleisthenes into a further ten tribes as a way of further democratizing the political system and remove more power from the elite few. The general trend of Athenian power being transferred from a concentrated few to a greater and more evenly distributed percentage of the citizenry is a result of the transition from a loose group of villages to a collective singular polis. Representation of the landowning citizens helped represent the expanded interests of Athens such as naval, commercial, and agrarian ventures. The democratic nature of democracy in Athens helped the synoecism of such a populous center in Ancient Greece.

=== Mytilenean Revolt ===
In 428 BCE Mytilene sought independence from the Athenian Empire by way of a planned revolt. Despite never occurring, the revolt would have placed Mytilene at the centre of Lesbos synoecism in an effort to consolidate political power under the city's control to the extent that the hegemony of Athens could be overthrown. The successful synoecism of Lesbos under Mytilenean oligarchs would have caused Athens to reconsider its relationship with the city due to its central organization of the isle's resources. Unfortunately for Mytilene, Athens learned of this planned synoecism and besieged the city. Victorious Athenians then voted first for the murder of all male citizen and enslavement of women and children only to reverse their decision and committed only the leaders of the revolt. Under increased Athenian rule and observation, Mytilene was subjected to forced synoecism under Athens and its autonomy, curbed. Athenian citizens were sent to Lesbos in order to establish a stronger Athenian presence in Lesbos by collecting taxes from the Lesbians. The city walls of Mytilene were also dismantled under Athenian rule.

== Dioecism ==
A dioecism is essentially the inverse of a synoecism, the releasing of cities, towns or villages from their association with a polis. This process might manifest itself in several ways, such as the settling of new but independent communities within former territory of Constantinople on land abandoned due to a contraction of population, or the contraction of Thessaloniki out of its former neighborhoods outside the city walls due to the occupation of the countryside by the Turks. A conqueror might break up a polis for various reasons. As part of the settlement of the Third Sacred War in 346 BC, the Amphictyonic League was commissioned to destroy 21 or 22 cities of Phocis, many of which had already been burned. They chose the method of dioecism, returning the poleis to their constituent kōmai, or villages. The city fortifications were then dismantled. This relatively mild destruction was reversed by Athens and Thebes several years later as they were sympathetic to Phocis but their hands had been legally tied. The cities were re-synoecized and the larger states assisted Phocis to rebuild the fortifications.

The Spartan King Pausanias, choosing the method of dioecism rather than conquest, liberated the city of Plataea and granted them an independent "autonomoi" status. After defeating the occupying Persians, Sparta restored Plataean autonomy and rule over their city and outlying territories differentiating them from the larger hegemony of Athens in the Attica region. This dioecism carried serious political connotations for the Spartans who invaded again during the Peloponnesian War when it was referenced again by the Plataeans as a way of warning against Spartan interference with their sovereignty or their interests. The legitimacy of the dioecism and the connotations it brought being that Plataea is an independent city-state entity from Athens was enough so that it caused the invading Spartans to enter negotiations rather than violently raze the city and its hinterlands.

== As an archaeological site ==
"Synoecism" also denominates an ancient Cretan archaeological site on the western fringes of Troullos. Artifacts discovered at the site include a terracotta bull figurine, a bronze statuette, and Late Minoan I pottery.

== See also ==
- Aegean Civilization
- Minoan Civilization
- Mycenaean Greece
- Archaic Greece
- Classical Greece
- Hellenistic Greece
- Deme
- Municipium
- Polis
- Synoikia
- Xenelasia
- Ostracism

== Bibliography ==
- Abbott, Frank Frost; Johnson, Allan Chester (1926). Municipal Administration in the Roman Empire. Princeton: Princeton University Press.
