= Hans Bauer (Semitist) =

Hans Bauer (16 January 1878 – 3 June 1937) was a German Semitist and professor at the University of Halle in the early 1930s. He was involved in the decipherment of Ugaritic cuneiform on clay tablets discovered in Ras Shamra, Ugarit.
