= Kephala =

Hill in northern Crete, Greece

Coordinates: 35°17′53″N 25°09′45″E

Kephala is a hill landform in northern Crete, Greece. This location was chosen by ancient settlers for the site of the Palace of Knossos; the footprint of the Neolithic settlement at Kephala Hill was actually larger than the Bronze Age Palace of Knossos.

== See also ==
- Minoan civilization
