= Archanes =

Archanes Αρχάνες
- Municipal unit
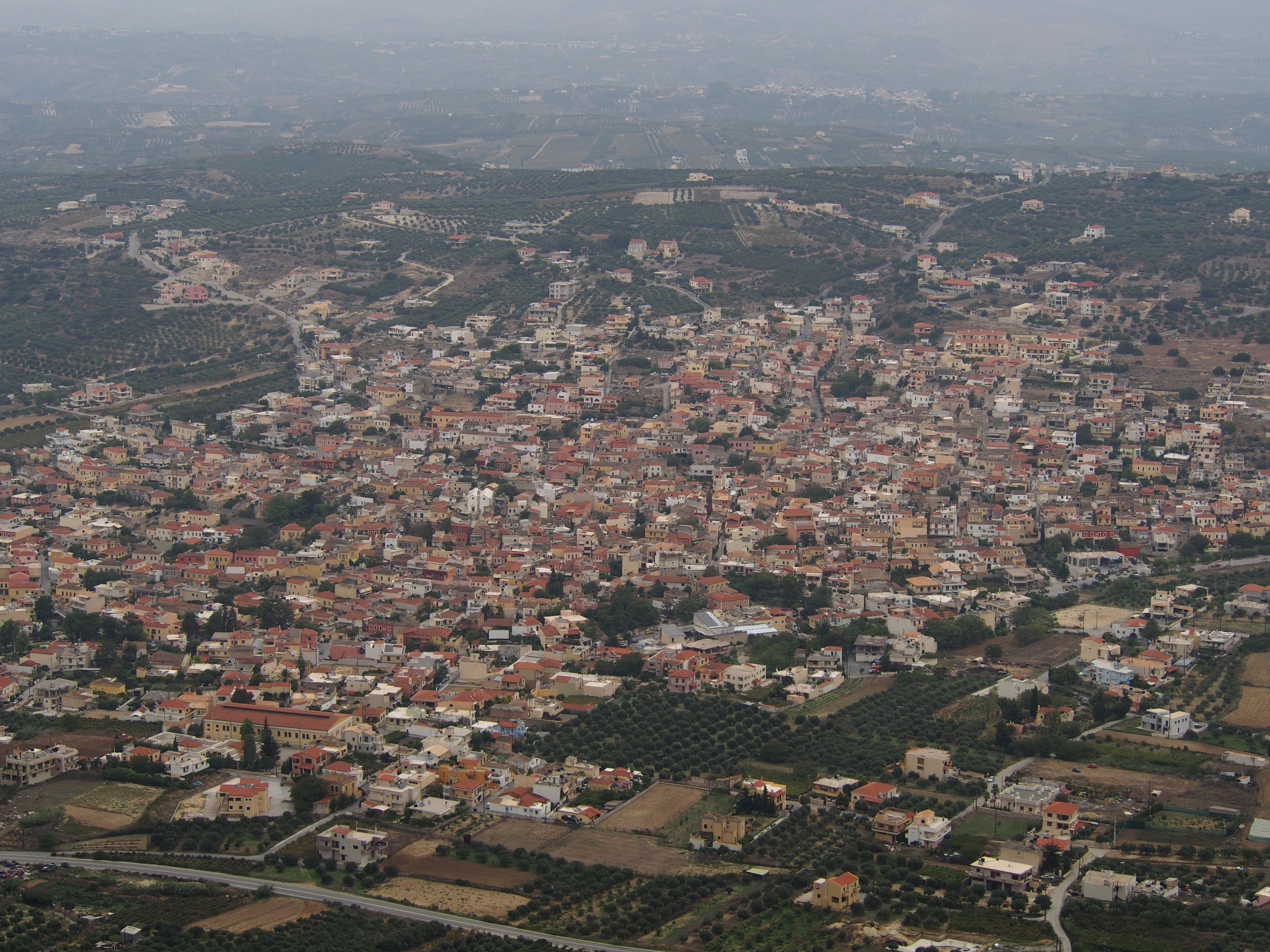

- Location within the regional unit

- Location within Greece
- Coordinates: 35°14′N 25°10′E
- Country: Greece
- Administrative region: Crete
- Regional unit: Heraklion
- Municipality: Archanes-Asterousia

Area
  - Municipal unit: 31.5 km^{2} (12.2 sq mi)
- Elevation: 340 m (1,120 ft)

Population (2021)
  - Municipal unit: 5,064
  - Municipal unit density: 161/km^{2} (416/sq mi)
  - Community: 3,901
- Time zone: UTC+2 (EET)
  - Summer (DST): UTC+3 (EEST)
- Postal code: 701 00
- Area code: 281
- Vehicle registration: HK, HP, HZ

Archanes (Greek: Αρχάνες, Godart & Olivier abbreviation: ARKH) is a former municipality in the Heraklion regional unit, Crete, Greece. Since the 2011 local government reform it is part of the municipality Archanes-Asterousia, of which it is a municipal unit. The municipal unit has an area of 31.516 km^{2} (12.168 sq mi). Population 5,064 (2021). It is also the archaeological site of an ancient Minoan settlement in central Crete. The discovery of ancient roads leading from Archanes to Juktas, Anemospilia, Xeri Kara and Vathypetro indicate that Archanes was an important hub in the region during Minoan times. Archaeological evidence indicates that ancient Archanes spread out over the same area as the modern town of Archanes.

== Archaeology ==
In 1912, Xanthoudides noted the importance of Archanes, but Sir Arthur Evans was the first to characterize the site as palatial, declaring that Archanes was likely a Summer Palace for the Knossos kings. Spyridon Marinatos and N. Platon excavated minor areas in the region, but nothing supported Evans' theory. In 1964, Yannis Sakellarakis dug trial trenches at the Tourkoyeitonia site and uncovered the first evidence of a palace site. Since 1966, Archanes has been excavated by the Greek Archaeological Society under the supervision of Yannis Sakellarakis and Efi Sapouna-Sakellarakis.

In the Minoan era, aqueducts delivered water to Kephala Hill from spring water sources at Archanes, which are also the source of the Kairatos River.

Troullos is the easternmost site of the Archanes settlement. Tourkoyeitonia, in central Archanes, is the site of its palace, likely built in the Middle Minoan period. Excavations began here in 1964 by Y. Sakellarakis. It contains features such as ashlar blocks, limestone plaques and blocks, plaster, wood, stucco floor tiles, gypsum, kouskoura slabs, mud bricks, ironstone blocks, schist plaques, blue marble flooring, carved concave altars, wooden columns and pillars, frescoes and Polytheron doorways. A variety of porphyrite stone lamps, vases, amphorae, cooking pots, cups, lamps, tools and every-day domestic items such as tweezers have been unearthed at the site. Southwest of Tourkogeitonia, more of the palace is found. While little remains of the architecture, the walls that are preserved are Middle Minoan III–Late Minoan IA. Linear A tablets and the model of a house were excavated at The Archive along with MMIII-LMIA pottery and several unworked pieces of rock crystal, obsidian and steatite.

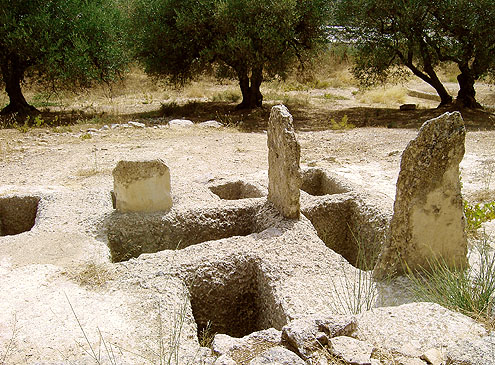

The man-made enclosure of a spring, partially excavated in 1921 by Sir Arthur Evans, was completed by Y. Sakellarakis in 1964. The floor is laid with pebbles, and the walls are limestone. Evidence indicates that it was built between Middle Minoan IB and Middle Minoan IIIA, destroyed during Late Minoan IA, and then restored and in various use afterward. The reservoir is within the palace grounds.

A large paved area, dissected by walkways that form a triangle, is found in the 'Theatre Area' or 'Aghios Nikolaos' (Saint Nicholas). Two stepped altars are found here, one on a walkway and one on the pavement. There is a painting of a reconstruction of this area in Sakellarakis' Crete Archanes guidebook on page 49, which does this area more justice than a written description.

Excavations in the 1980s in the archaeological site of Lakkos, an ancient Minoan settlement just south of Archanes, found a bronze bull figurine and bronze chisel.

== Economy ==
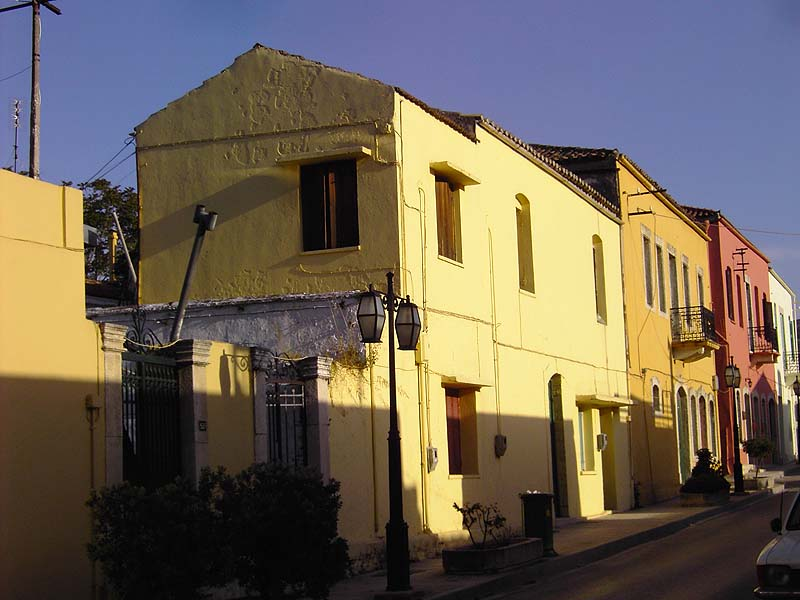
Street in Archanes

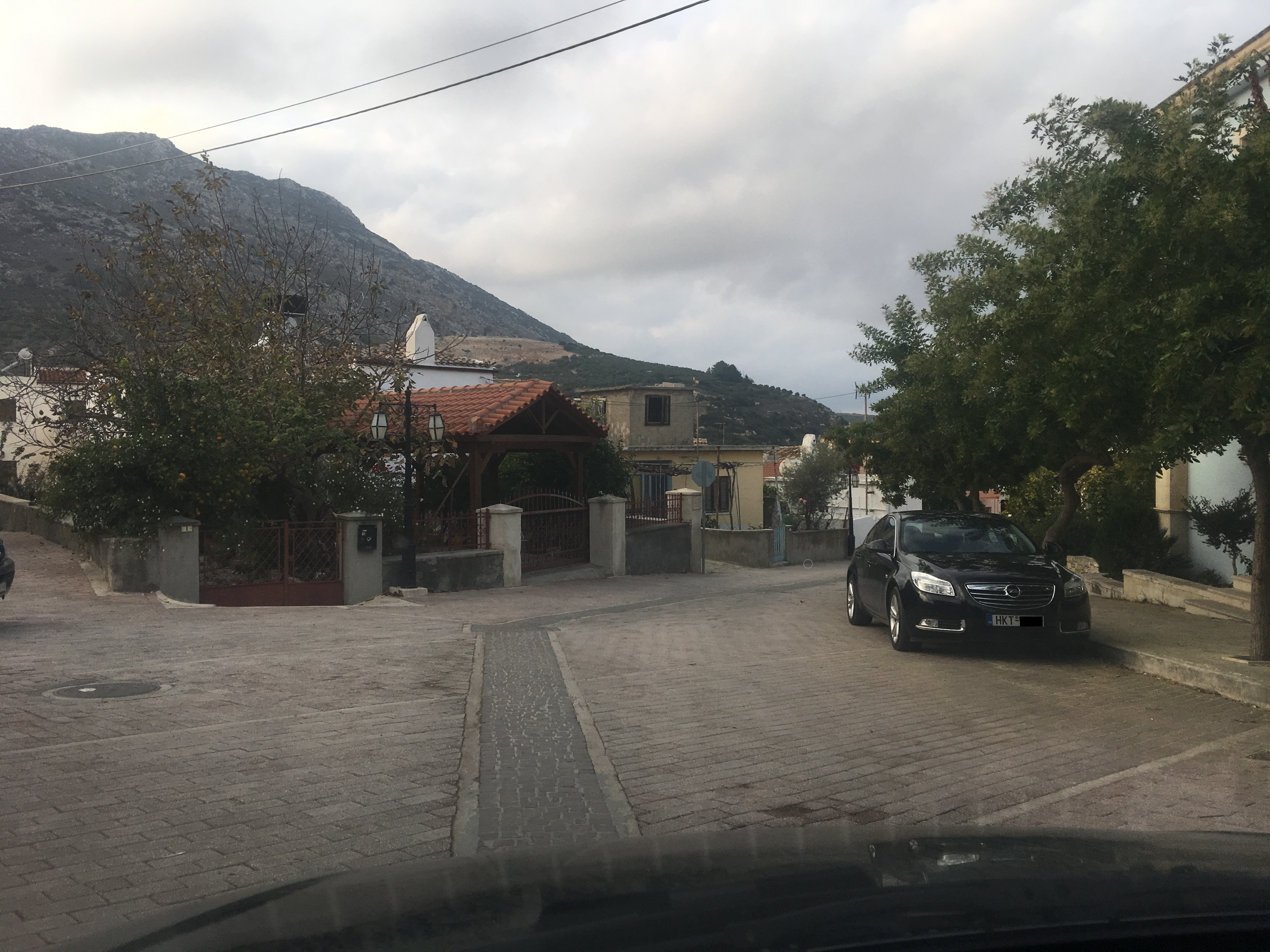
Street in Archanes

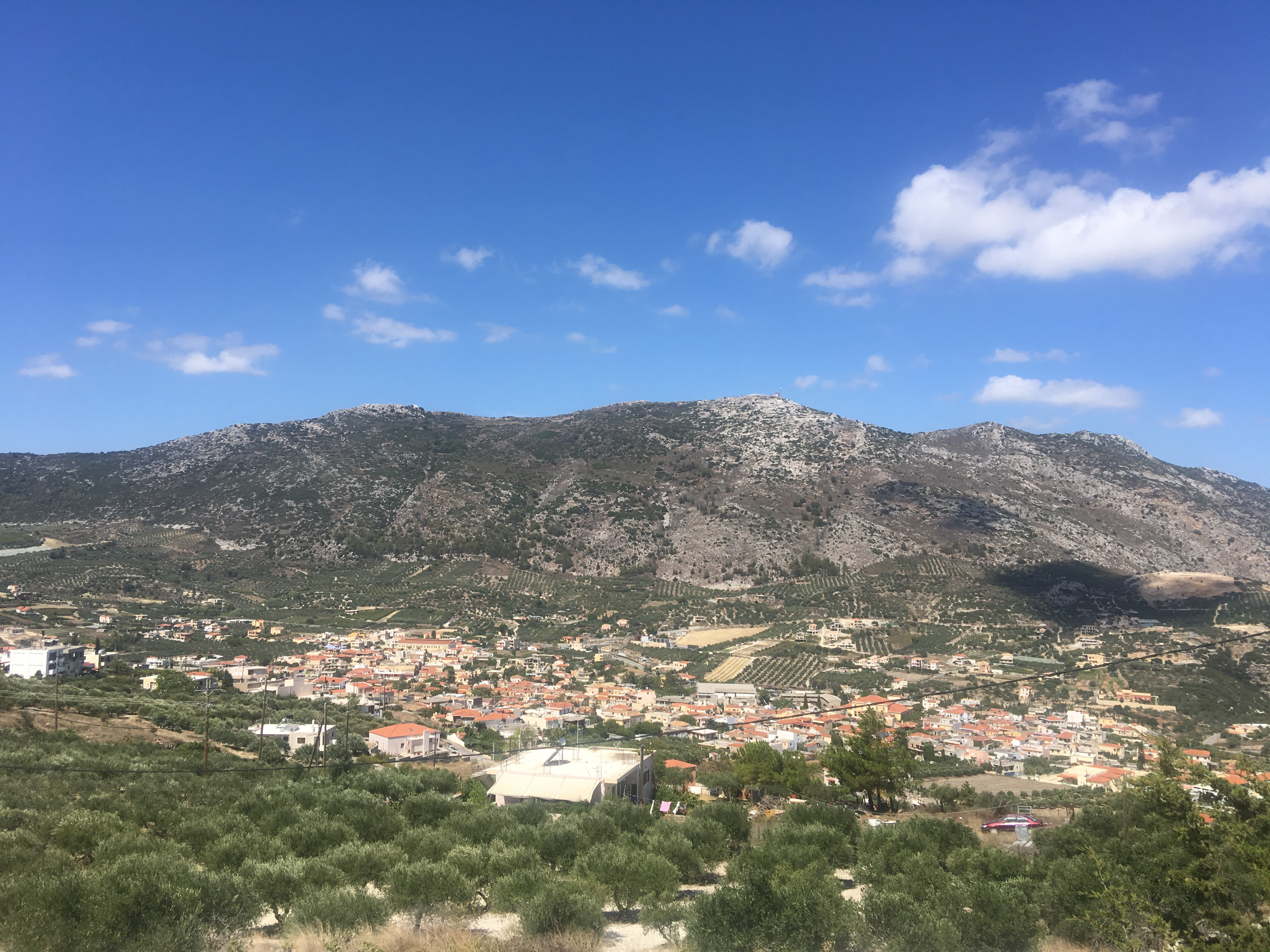
Aerial view of Archanes, with Mount Juktas in the background

The economy revolves around grape and olive processing and marketing. Both products account for some 96% of its total agricultural products. The Agricultural Cooperative of Archanes, set up in 1931, is one of the oldest in Greece, and consists of 1119 members. A quarter of the wine production is exported to Germany, France and the Netherlands, and the rest of the production is largely marketed domestically. Since the late 1990s, attempts have been made to convert part of wine making step by step to organic and integrated farming, beginning with the cultivation of table grapes.
