= Phaistos Disc decipherment claims =

Alleged deciphering of unknown symbols on the Phaistos Disc

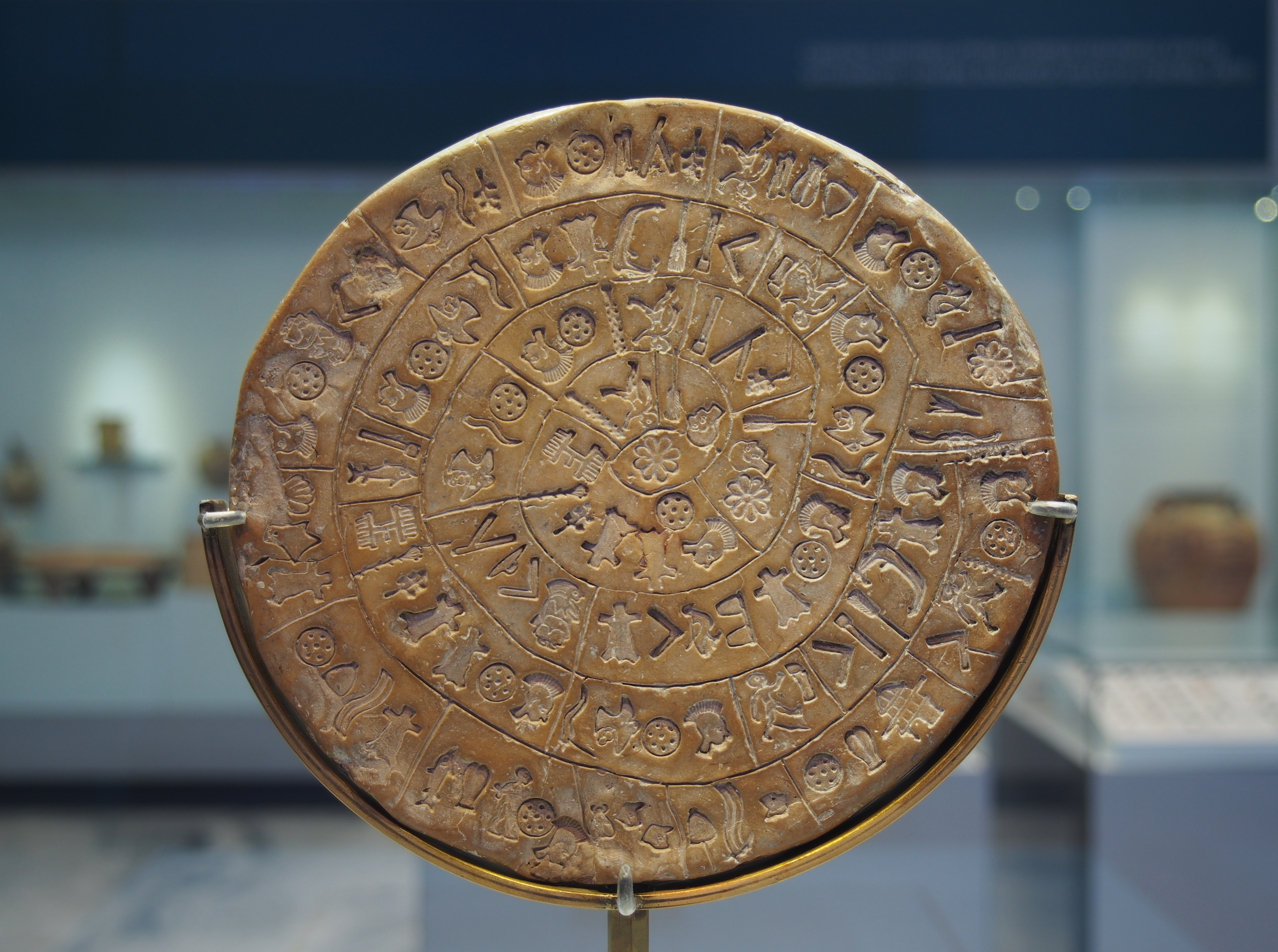
Phaistos Disc, side A

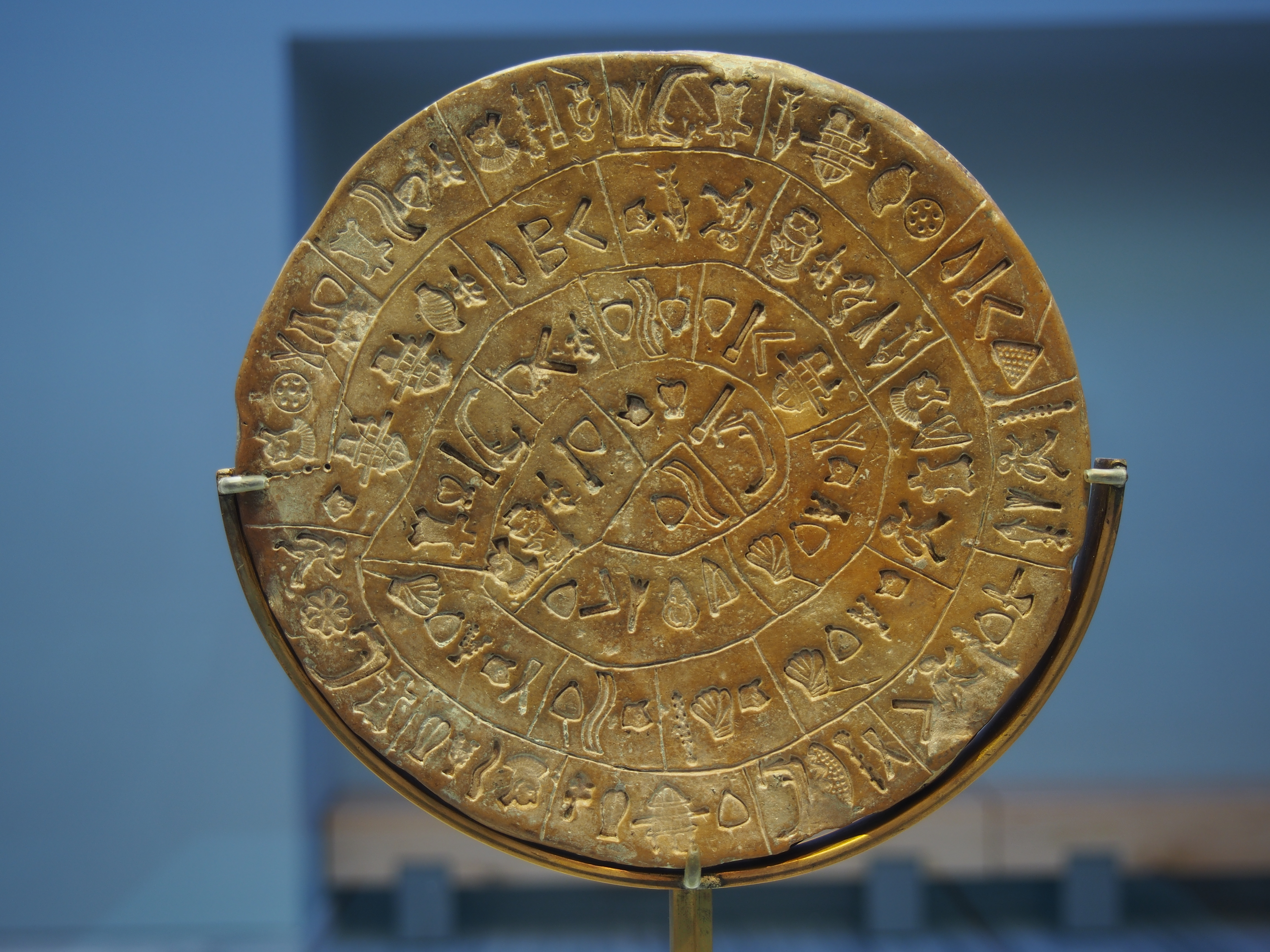
Phaistos Disc, side B

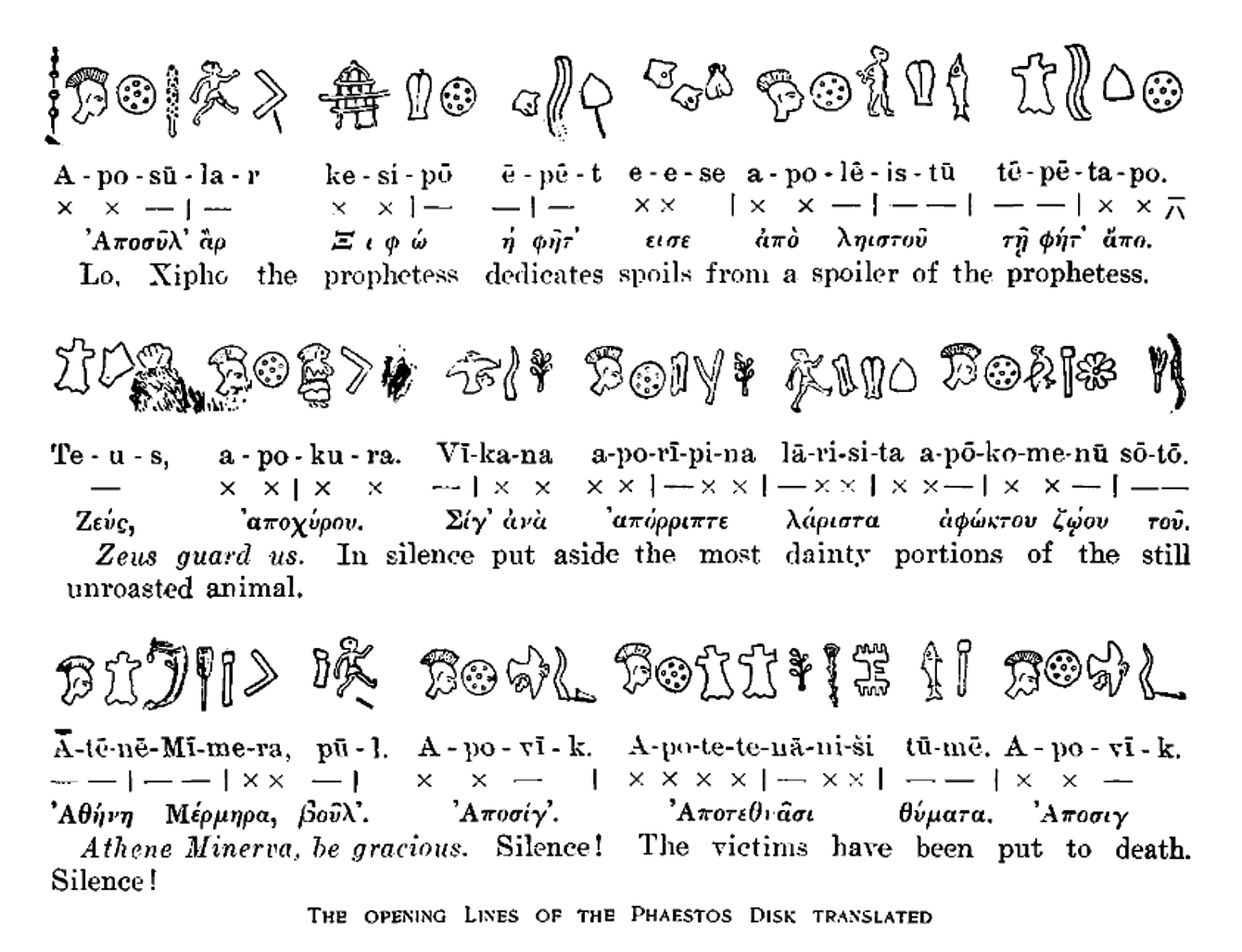
Hempl's translation of the opening lines of the disc, from Harper's Magazine

Many people have claimed to have deciphered the Phaistos Disc.

The claims may be categorized into linguistic decipherments, identifying the language of the inscription, and non-linguistic decipherments. A purely ideographical reading is semantic but not linguistic in the strict sense: While a semantic decipherment may reveal the intended meaning of the symbols in the inscription, it would not allow us to identify the underlying words or their language.

A large part of the claims are clearly pseudoscientific, if not bordering on the esoteric. Linguists are doubtful whether the inscription is sufficiently long to be unambiguously interpreted. Mainstream consensus tends towards the assumption of a syllabic script, possibly mixed with ideogram, like the known scripts of the epoch (Egyptian hieroglyphs, Anatolian hieroglyphs, Linear B).

Some approaches attempt to establish a connection with known scripts, either the roughly contemporary Cretan hieroglyphs or Linear A native to Crete, or Egyptian or Anatolian hieroglyphics. Solutions postulating an independent Aegean script have also been proposed.

== Linguistic interpretations ==
=== Greek ===
- George Hempl (1911) (interpretation as Ionic Greek, syllabic writing)
  - side A first; reading inwards; side A begins Ἀποσῦλ’ ἂρ...

Hempls readings of side A: A-po-su-la-r ke-si-po e-pe-t e-e-se a-po-le-is-tu te-pe-ta-po. (Lo, Xipho the prophetess dedicates spoils from a spoiler of the prophetess.) Te-u-s, a-po-ku-ra. (Zeus guard us.) Vi-ka-na a-po-ri-pi-na la-ri-si-ta a-po-ko-me-nu so-to. (In silence put aside the most dainty portions of the still unroasted animal.) A-te-ne-Mi-me-ra pu-l. (Athene Minerva, be gracious.) A-po-vi-k. (Silence!) A-po-te-te-na-ni-si tu-me. (The victims have been put to death.) A-po-vi-k. (Silence!)

- F.M. Stawell (1911) (interpretation as Homeric Greek, syllabic writing);
  - side B first; reading inward: side A begins ἄνασσα κῶθί ῥα· ...
  - Not Ionic; B30 is non-sigmatic ἄνασσ' ἰά λῦται; B6 is τᾶ, Μαρὰ, δᾶ–, with four long alphas.
- Steven R. Fischer (1988) (interpretation as a Greek dialect, syllabic writing);
  - side A first; reading inwards; 02-12 reads E-qe 'hear ye'.[See book Glyph Breaker (1997) for full account]
- D. Ohlenroth (1996) (interpretation as a Greek dialect, alphabetic writing);
  - side A first; reading outwards; numerous homophonic signs
- B. Schwarz (1959) (interpretation as Mycenean Greek, syllabic writing)
  - side A first; reading inwards.
  - comparison with Linear B as starting point.
- A. Martin (2000) (interpretation as a Greek-Minoan bilingual text, alphabetic writing)
  - reading outwards;
  - reads only side A as Greek and says side B is Minoan
- K. & K. Massey (1998) (partial decipherment - interpretation as a Greek dialect, syllabic writing)
  - reading outwards
  - suggest, based on comparisons with Linear B, and a suggestion by linguist Miguel Carrasquer Vidal, that the words marked by slashes are numbers spelled out, so the disk would be a form of receipt for goods, designed to be easily destroyed
- M.G. Corsini (2008, 2010) (interpretation as proto-Ionic language, syllabic writing); side A first; reading outwards; (Italian) 1348 a.C. Apoteosi di Radamanto.

=== Unknown language ===
- G. Owens & J. Coleman (2014) (based on Cretan hieroglyphics, Minoan Linear A and Mycenaean Linear B); possibly prayer to a Minoan goddess.

=== "Proto-Ionic" ===
J. Faucounau (1975) considers the script as the original invention of a Cycladic and maritime Aegean people, the proto-Ionians, who had picked up the idea of a syllabic acrophonic script from Egypt at the time of the VI^{th} Dynasty. He interprets the text as "proto-Ionic" Greek in syllabic writing.

Reading side A first, inwards, he deciphers a (funerary) hymn to one Arion, child of Argos, destroyer of Iasos. The language is a Greek dialect, written with considerable phonological ambiguities, comparable to the writing of Mycenean Greek in Linear B, hand-crafted by Faucounau to suit his reading, among other things postulating change of digamma to y and loss of labiovelars, but retention of Indo-European -sy- (in the genitive singular -osyo, Homeric -oio). Faucounau has gathered evidence, which he asserts shows the existence of proto-Ionians as early as the Early Bronze Age and of a proto-Ionic language with the required characteristics during the Late Bronze Age. He has presented this evidence in several papers and summarized it in two books.

The text begins

ka-s (a)r-ko-syo / pa-yi-s / a-ri-o / a-a-mo / ka-s læ-yi-to / te-ri-o-s / te-tmæ-næ
kas Argoio payis Arion ahamos. kas læi(s)ton dærios tetmænai
"Arion, the son of Argos, is without equal. He has distributed the spoil of battle."

Faucounau's solution was critically reviewed by Duhoux (2000), who in particular was sceptical about the consonantal sign s (D12) in the otherwise syllabic script, which appears word-finally in the sentence particle kas, but not in nominatives like ahamos. Most syllabaries would either omit s in both places, or use a syllable beginning with s in both places.

=== Luwian ===
Achterberg et al. (2004) interpreted the text as Anatolian hieroglyphic, reading inwards, side A first. The research group proposes a 14th century date, based on a dating of tablet PH 1, the associated Linear A tablet.

The group reads the oblique stylus-drawn strokes at the end of some words as a 46th glyph, and identify it with the Luwian personal name determinative symbol 'r(a/i)', but assign it the value '-ti'. Phaistos glyph 01 is compared to the logogram 'SARU', a walking man or walking legs in Luwian. 02 is compared to word-initial 'a_{2}', a head with a crown in Luwian. The "bow" 11 is identified as the logogram 'sol suus', the winged sun known from Luwian royal seals. Sign 12 (SHIELD) is compared to the near identical Luwian logogram 'TURPI' "bread" and assigned the value 'tu'. Phaistos glyph 39 is read as the "thunderbolt", logogram of the god Tarhunt, in Luwian a W-shaped hieroglyph.

With these and other hypotheses, they arrive at a proposed translation of the text. It would be a Luwian document of land ownership, addressed to one na-sa-tu ("Nestor"; Dative na-sa-ti) of hi-ya-wa (Ahhiyawa). Toponyms read are pa-ya-tu (Phaistos), ra-su-ta (Lasithi), mi-SARU (Mesara), ku-na-sa (Knossos), sa_{3}-har-wa (Scheria), ri-ti-na (Rhytion). Another personal name read is i-du-ma-na ("Idomeneus"), governor of Mesara. The text begins

a-tu mi_{1}-SARU sa+ti / pa-ya-tu / u ^{N}na-sa_{2}-ti / u u-ri / a-tu hi-ya-wa
atu Misari sati Payatu. u Nasati, u uri atu Hiyawa.
"In Mesara is Phaistos. To Nestor, to the great [man] in Ahhiyawa."

=== Hittite ===
- Vladimir Georgiev (1976) (interpretation as Hittite language, syllabic writing);
  - side A first; reading outwards;

=== Egyptian ===
- Albert Cuny (1914) (interpretation as an ancient Egyptian document, syllabic-ideographic writing);

=== Semitic ===
- K. Aartun (1992) (interpretation as a Semitic language, syllabic writing);
  - side A first; reading outwards;
- C.H. Gordon;
- J.G.P. Best.

== Ideographic ==
- F.G. Gordon (1931) (interpretation as ideographic writing, translated into "Basque" Reading side B first.
- H. Haarmann (1990) (interpretation as ideographic writing);

== Sources ==
- Aartun, Kjell (1992). Der Diskos von Phaistos; Die beschriftete Bronzeaxt; Die Inschrift der Taragona-tafel [The Phaistos Disc; The Inscribed Bronze Axe; The inscription of the Taragona tablet]. Die minoische Schrift : Sprache und Texte [The Minoan Script: Language and texts] (in German). Vol. 1. Wiesbaden: Harrassowitz. ISBN 3-447-03273-1.
- Balistier, Thomas (2000). The Phaistos Disc - an account of its unsolved mystery. Verlag Thomas Balistier. — describes Aarten's and Ohlenroth's decipherments.
- Balodēma-Polygiannakē, Ephē (1996). Ho Diskos tēs Phaistou milaei hellēnika: hē hellēnikē katagōgē tōn Minōitōn Ο Δισκος της Φαιστού Μιλάει Ελληνικά [The Phaistos Disk Speaks Greek] (in Greek). Translated by Antikas, T. Athens: Georgiadis. ISBN 9789603160649.
- Faucounau, Jean (1999). Le déchiffrement du Disque de Phaistos [Deciphering the Phaistos Disc] (in French). Paris.
- Faucounau, Jean (2001b). Les Proto-Ioniens : histoire d'un peuple oublié [The Proto-Ionians: History of a forgotten people] (in French). Paris.
- Fischer, Steven R. (1988). Evidence for Hellenic Dialect in the Phaistos Disk. Herbert Lang. ISBN 3-261-03703-2.
- Georgiev, Vladimir (1976). "Le déchiffrement du texte sur le disque de Phaistos" [The decryption of the text on the Phaistos Disc]. Linguistique Balkanique [Balkan Linguistics] (in French). 19: 5–47.
- Hausmann, Axel (2002). Der Diskus von Phaistos: Ein Dokument aus Atlantis [The Phaistos Disk: A document from Atlantis] (in German). BoD GmbH. ISBN 3-8311-4548-2.
- Kvashilava, Gia (2008). On the Phaistos Disk as a sample of Colchian Goldscript and its related scripts (Report) – via academia.edu.
- Martin, Adam (2000). Der Diskos von Phaistos – Ein zweisprachiges Dokument geschrieben in einer frühgriechischen Alphabetschrift [The Phaistos Disc – A bilingual document written in an early Greek alphabet] (in German). Ludwig Auer Verlag. ISBN 3-9807169-1-0.
- Ohlenroth, Derk (1996). Das Abaton des lykäischen Zeus und der Hain der Elaia: Zum Diskos von Phaistos und zur frühen griechischen Schriftkultur [The Abaton of Lycaean Zeus and the Grove of Elaia: On the Phaistos Disc and on early Greek writing] (in German). M. Niemeyer. ISBN 3-484-80008-9.
- Pomerance, Leon (1976). The Phaistos Disk: An interpretation of astronomical symbols. Göteborg: Paul Astroms forlag. Kelley, D.H. (Summer 1979). "[no title cited]". The Journal of Archeoastronomy (book review). II (3).
- Stawell, F. Melian (1911). "An interpretation of the Phaistos Disk". The Burlington Magazine for Connoisseurs. Vol. 19, no. 97. pp. 23–38. JSTOR 858643.
- Schwartz, Benjamin (1959). "The Phaistos disk". Journal of Near Eastern Studies. 18 (2): 105–112. doi:10.1086/371517. S2CID 162272726.
