= Benjamin Schwartz =

Benjamin Schwartz or Ben Schwartz may refer to:

- Benjamin Schwartz (linguist) (died 1981), American researcher on Indoeuropean and ancient Middle East languages
- Benjamin I. Schwartz (1916-1999), American academic, political scientist, and sinologist
- Ben Schwartz (born 1981), American actor, comedian, writer, director and producer

== See also ==
- Benjamin Schwarz (disambiguation)
- Benjamin Shwartz (born 1979), American-Israeli composer
- Ben Swartz, American software engineer and activist
