= Paul Faure =

Paul Faure may refer to:

- Paul Faure (archaeologist) (1916–2007), French archaeologist
- Paul Faure (politician) (1878–1960), French politician
