= Pseudolinguistic =

Pseudolinguistic may mean

- imitating some qualities of language
  - an early stage in language acquisition ("babbling")
  - Glossolalia
  - a toy model in language modelling
- linguistic pseudo-scholarship
  - Pseudoscientific language comparison
  - Phaistos Disc decipherment claims
  - Sun Language Theory
  - Lemurian Tamil
  - Folk linguistics
