= Phaistos Disc =

Inscribed clay disc found in Crete, Greece

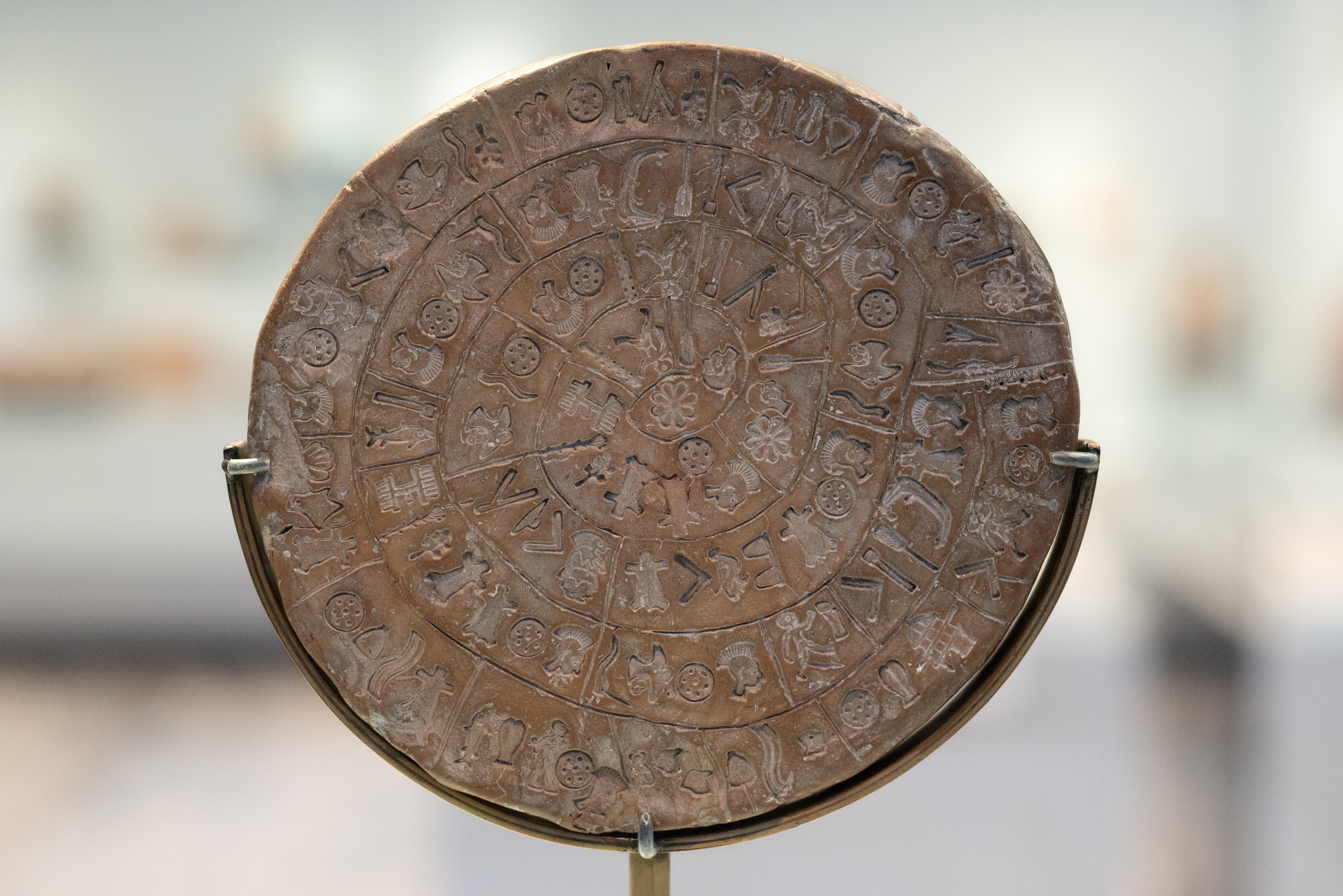
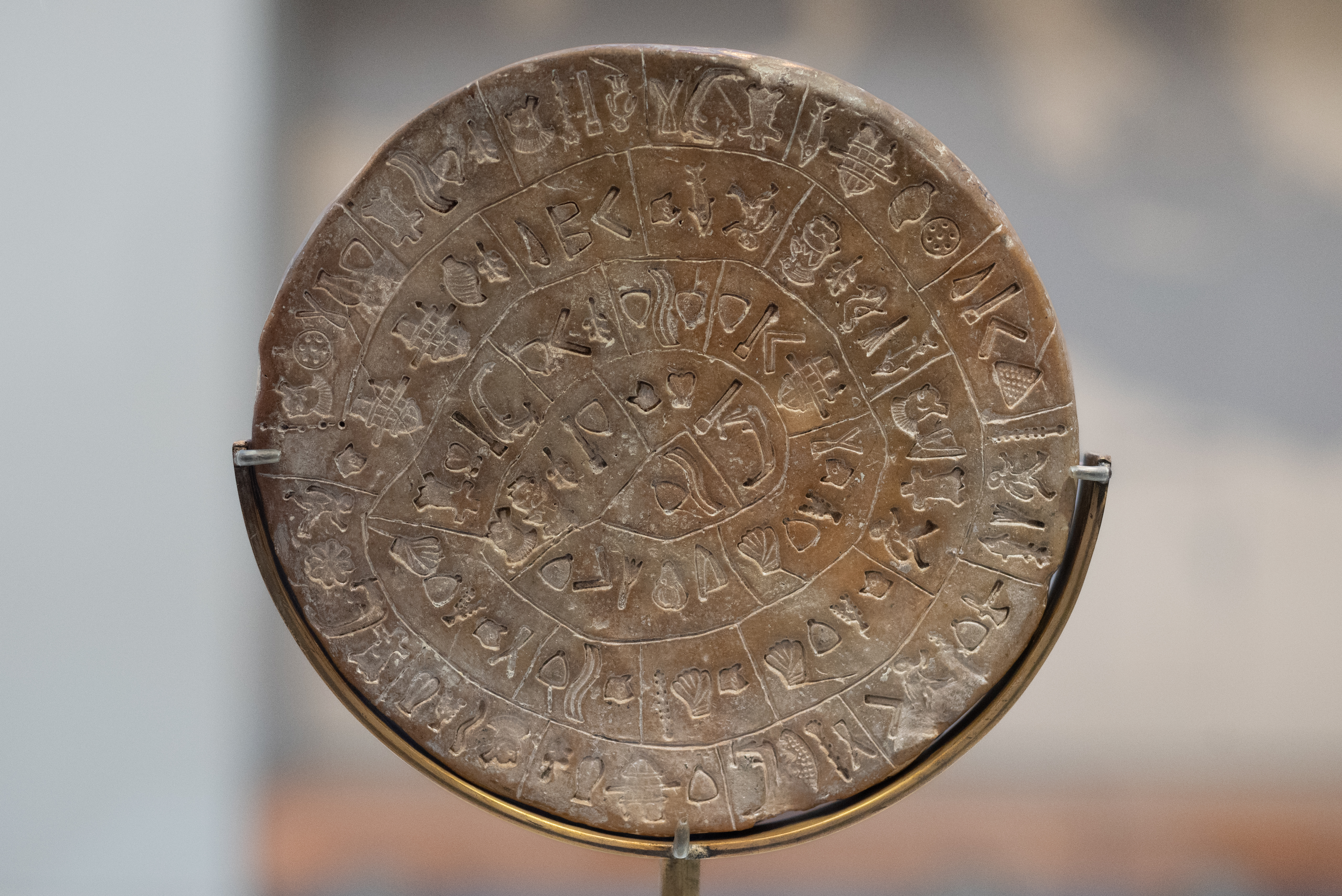
- Phaistos Disc, side A (top) and side B (bottom)
- Material: Clay
- Created: 2nd millennium BC
- Discovered: July 3, 1908; Phaistos, Crete, Greece
- Discovered by: Luigi Pernier
- Present location: Heraklion Archaeological Museum, Crete, Greece

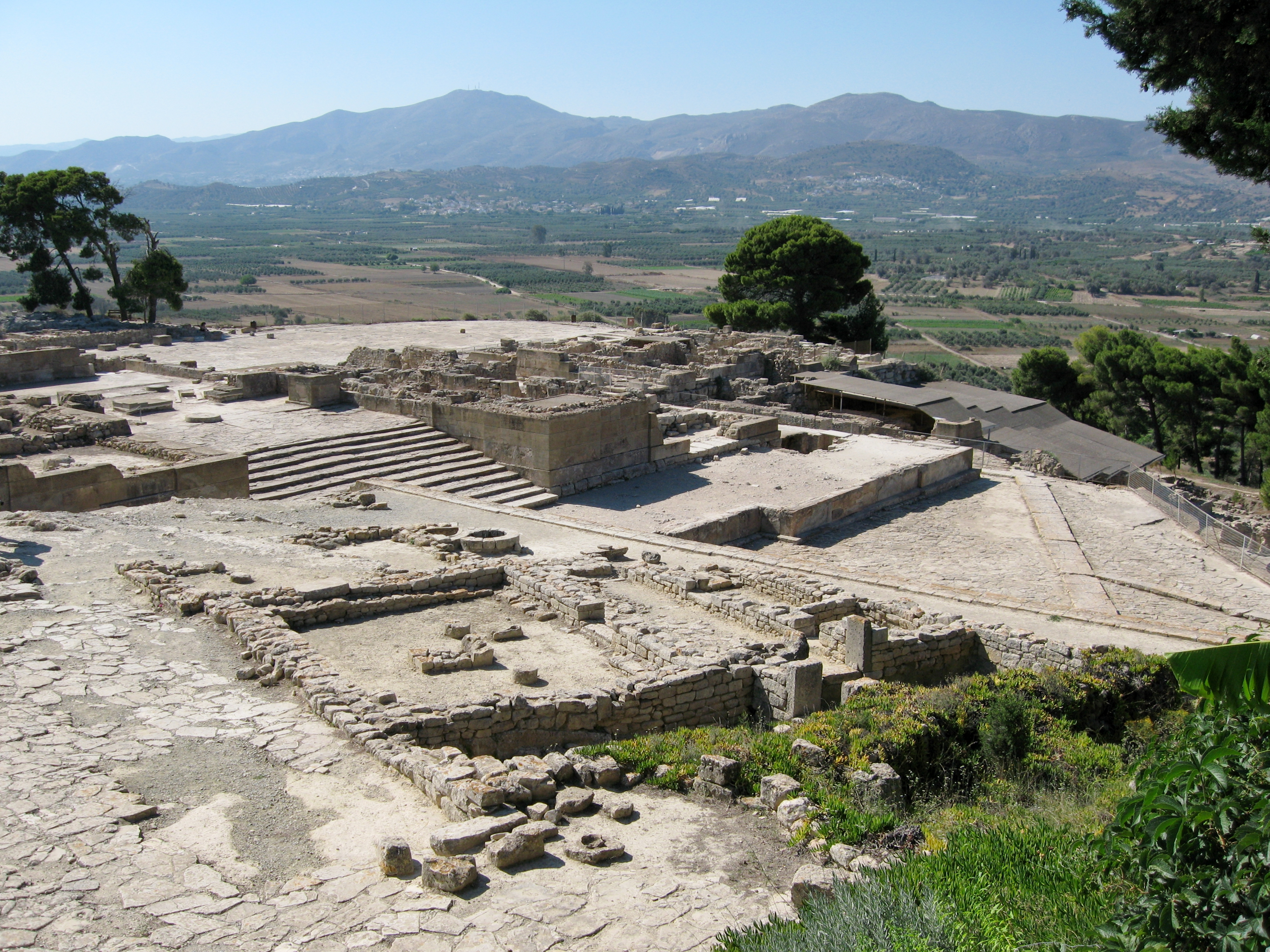
Palace complex at Phaistos

The Phaistos Disc, or Phaistos Disk, is a disc of fired clay from the island of Crete, Greece, possibly from the middle or late Minoan Bronze Age (second millennium BC), bearing a text in an unknown script and language. Its purpose and its original place of manufacture remain disputed. It is now on display at the archaeological museum of Heraklion. The name is sometimes spelled Phaestos or Festos.

The disc was discovered in 1908 by the Italian archaeologist Luigi Pernier during the excavation of the Minoan palace of Phaistos. The disc is about 16 cm (6.3 in) in diameter and is covered on each side with a spiral text, consisting of a total of 242 occurrences of 45 distinct signs, which were created by pressing individual sign stamps onto the soft clay before firing. While its unique features initially led some scholars to suspect a forgery or hoax, the disc is now generally accepted by archaeologists as authentic.

The disc has captured the imagination of amateur and professional palaeographers, and many attempts have been made to decipher the code behind the disc's signs. While it is not clear that it is a script, most attempted decipherments assume that it is; most additionally assume a syllabary, others an alphabet or logography.

== Discovery ==
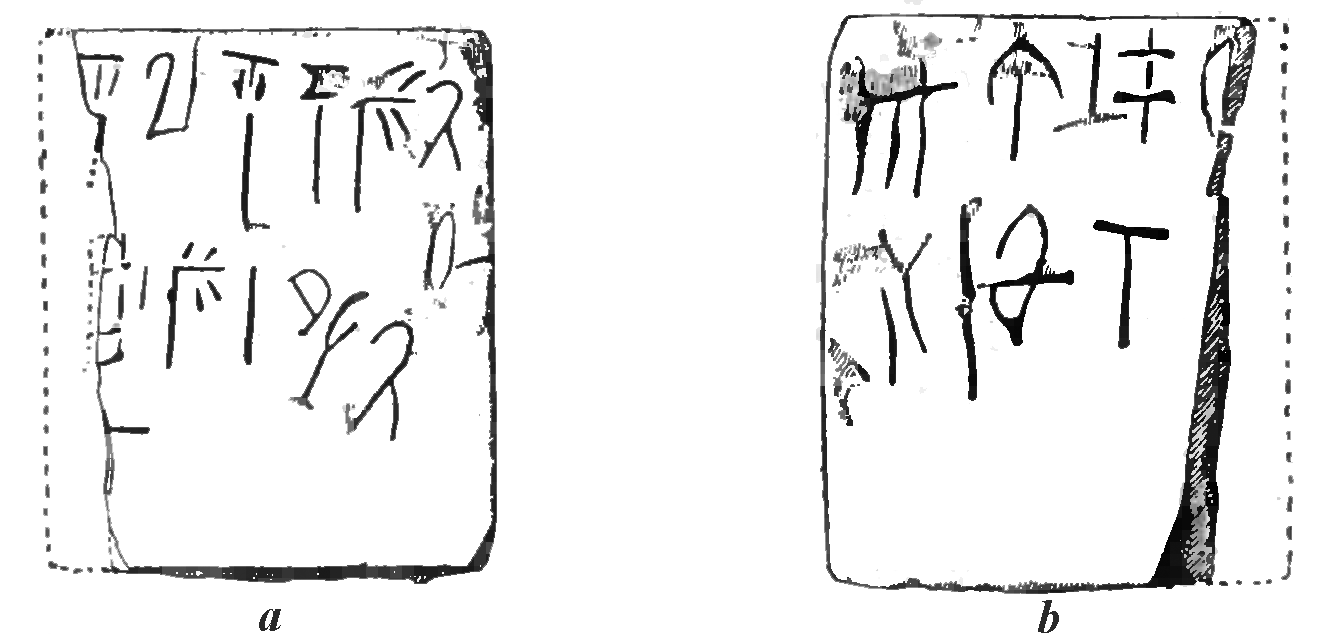
The Linear A tablet PH-1 that was originally found by archaeologist Zakarias Iliakis next to the Phaistos Disc

The Phaistos Disc was discovered in the Minoan palace-site of Phaistos, near Hagia Triada, on the south coast of Crete; specifically, the disc was found in the basement of room 8 in building 101 of a group of buildings to the northeast of the main palace. This grouping of four rooms also served as a formal entry into the palace complex. Italian archaeologist Luigi Pernier recovered the intact "dish" on 3 July 1908 during his excavation of the first Minoan palace.

The disc was found in the main cell of an underground "temple depository". These basement cells, only accessible from above, were neatly covered with a layer of fine plaster. Their content was poor in precious artifacts, but rich in black earth and ashes, mixed with burnt bovine bones. In the northern part of the main cell, in the same black layer, a few centimetres south-east of the disc and about 50 cm (20 in) above the floor, Linear A tablet 'PH-1' was also found.

== Dating ==
Yves Duhoux (1977) dates the disc to between 1850 BC and 1600 BC (MM III in Minoan chronology) on the basis of Luigi Pernier's report, which says that the disc was in a Middle Minoan undisturbed context. Jeppesen (1963) dates it to after 1400 (LM II–LM III in Minoan chronology). Doubting the viability of Pernier's report, Louis Godart (1990) resigns himself to admitting that archaeologically, the disc may be dated to anywhere in Middle or Late Minoan times (MM I–LM III, a period spanning most of the second millennium BC). Jan Best suggests a date in the first half of the 14th century BC (LM IIIA) based on his dating of tablet PH-1.

== Physical description ==
=== Material ===
The disc is made of fine-grained clay. Some authors have stated that the clay does not appear to be of local origin, perhaps not even from Crete. It was intentionally and properly fired, unlike tablets and seals that were baked only accidentally.

=== Shape and dimensions ===
The disc is approximately cylindrical, about 16 cm (6.3 in) in diameter and almost 2 cm (0.8 in) thick, with rounded edges. More precisely, the outline is slightly egg-shaped, with the diameter varying from 15.8 to 16.5 cm (6.2 to 6.5 in) and the thickness from 1.6 to 2.1 cm (0.63 to 0.83 in). The disc is slightly concave on side A and convex on side B.

=== Typographic writing ===
The most remarkable feature of the Phaistos disc is that the embossed signs that comprise its inscription all result from pressing separate stamps – one for each symbol – into the soft clay before firing. Thus the disc can be seen as an early example of movable-type printing. Typesetter and linguist Herbert Brekle writes:

If the disc is, as assumed, a textual representation, we are really dealing with a "printed" text, which fulfills all definitional criteria of the typographic principle. The spiral sequencing of the graphematical units, the fact that they are impressed in a clay disc (blind printing!) and not imprinted are merely possible technological variants of textual representation. The decisive factor is that the material "types" are proven to be repeatedly instantiated on the clay disc.

A medieval example of a similar blind printing technique is the Prüfening dedicatory inscription of 1119 AD.

Popular-science author Jared Diamond describes the disc as an example of a technological innovation that did not become widespread because it was made at the wrong time in history. Diamond contrasts the process with Gutenberg's printing press.

=== Scribed lines ===
Besides the stamped symbols, there are a few markings made by scoring the moist clay with a sharp stylus. On each side there is a continuous spiral line that separates successive turns of the text. The strip between successive spires of this line is divided into sections by short radial lines, so that each section contains a few whole signs. The presumed start of the text, adjacent to the edge, is also marked by such a radial stroke, with the addition of five dots punched along it with the stylus. Finally, under some of the stamped signs, there are short oblique strokes.

== Signs ==
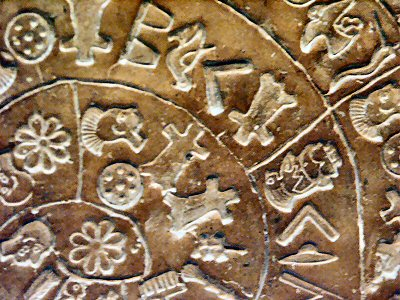

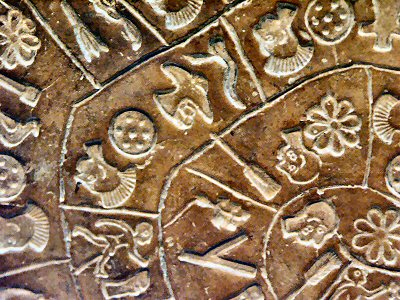

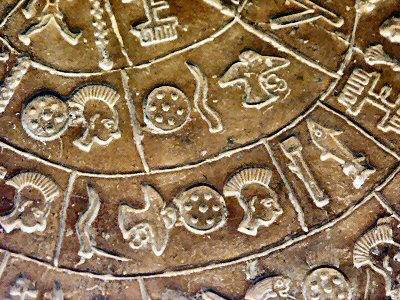

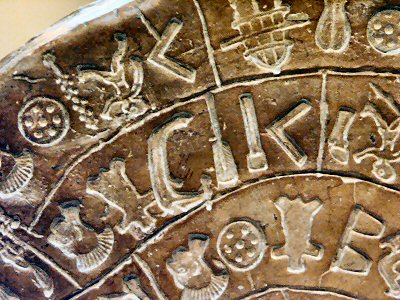

=== Sign list and counts ===
There are 45 distinct signs on the disc, occurring a total of 242 times—123 on side A and 119 on side B. In addition to these, a small diagonal line was incised with a stylus (not stamped) underneath some signs, a total of 18 times. The 45 symbols were numbered by Sir Arthur Evans from 01 to 45, and this numbering has been adopted by most researchers.

The signs were added to the Unicode universal computer character (UCS) set in 2008, after a 2006 proposal by Michael Everson and John H. Jenkins. In the following table, the No. column is the Evans number of each sign; the Glyph column is a modern drawing of the symbol; and the Font column uses the UCS font available in the browser. The assigned Unicode names are PHAISTOS DISC SIGN followed by the names shown under Name in the table below, taken from a 1995 book by Louis Godart.

One sign occurrence on side A is too damaged to identify. According to Godart, it may be sign 03 (TATTOOED HEAD) or 20 (DOLIUM); or less probably 08 (GAUNTLET) or 44 (SMALL AXE). Theoretically, it could also be a 46th distinct sign.

The sign images below are reversed left-to-right relative to their appearance on the disc, reflecting their presentation in most Western books and articles.

Also, some signs occur in the disc in two or more orientations, rotated by 90 or 180 degrees. It is generally assumed that the rotation has no semantic or linguistic value, so the rotated copies are still the same symbol. Therefore, the "normal" orientation of those signs is not known, and might have been left to the scribe's discretion.

Sign				Frequency		
No.	Glyph	Font	Name	A	B	A+B
01	01	𐇐	PEDESTRIAN	6	5	11
02	02	𐇑	PLUMED HEAD	14	5	19
03	03	𐇒	TATTOOED HEAD	2	0	2
04	04	𐇓	CAPTIVE	1	0	1
05	05	𐇔	CHILD	0	1	1
06	06	𐇕	WOMAN	2	2	4
07	07	𐇖	HELMET	3	15	18
08	08	𐇗	GAUNTLET	1	4	5
09	09	𐇘	TIARA	0	2	2
10	10	𐇙	ARROW	4	0	4
11	11	𐇚	BOW	1	0	1
12	12	𐇛	SHIELD	15	2	17
13	13	𐇜	CLUB	3	3	6
14	14	𐇝	MANACLES	1	1	2
15	15	𐇞	MATTOCK	0	1	1
16	16	𐇟	SAW	0	2	2
17	17	𐇠	LID	1	0	1
18	18	𐇡	BOOMERANG	6	6	12
19	19	𐇢	CARPENTRY PLANE	3	0	3
20	20	𐇣	DOLIUM	0	2	2
21	21	𐇤	COMB	2	0	2
22	22	𐇥	SLING	0	5	5
23	23	𐇦	COLUMN	5	6	11
24	24	𐇧	BEEHIVE	1	5	6
25	25	𐇨	SHIP	2	5	7
26	26	𐇩	HORN	5	1	6
27	27	𐇪	HIDE	10	5	15
28	28	𐇫	BULLS LEG	2	0	2
29	29	𐇬	CAT	3	8	11
30	30	𐇭	RAM	0	1	1
31	31	𐇮	EAGLE	5	0	5
32	32	𐇯	DOVE	2	1	3
33	33	𐇰	TUNNY	2	4	6
34	34	𐇱	BEE	1	2	3
35	35	𐇲	PLANE TREE	5	6	11
36	36	𐇳	VINE	0	4	4
37	37	𐇴	PAPYRUS	2	2	4
38	38	𐇵	ROSETTE	3	1	4
39	39	𐇶	LILY	1	3	4
40	40	𐇷	OX BACK	3	3	6
41	41	𐇸	FLUTE	2	0	2
42	42	𐇹	GRATER	0	1	1
43	43	𐇺	STRAINER	0	1	1
44	44	𐇻	SMALL AXE	1	0	1
45	45	𐇼	WAVY BAND	2	4	6

=== Nature of depicted objects ===
Many of the signs are depictions of concrete objects with a recognizable general nature (such as humans, birds, plants, a boat), or parts thereof (heads, hides, flowers). However, in most cases the precise nature of objects depicted is unknown. The sign names assigned by scholars, in particular by Godart and the Unicode consortium, were rather arbitrary, often based on the slightest shape similarity.

Symbol 21 (Godart's "COMB") was once conjectured to be a palace floorplan. However, this hypothesis was cast in doubt by the discovery of a vase with a nearly identical symbol incised on the bottom, believed to be a potter's mark.

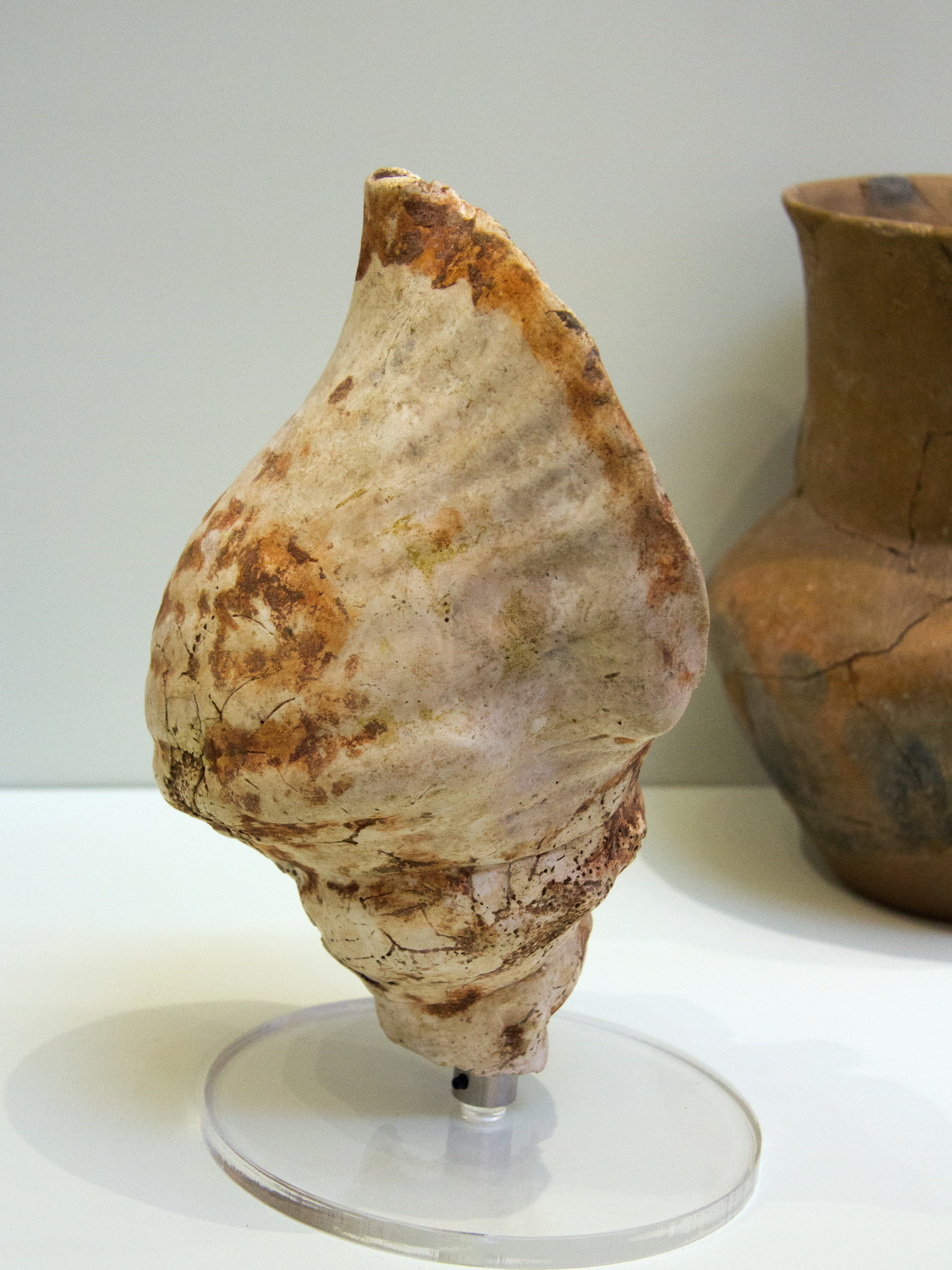
Ritual sea snail (triton) conch, decorated with red paint. Phaistos, 3600–3000 BC.

Symbol 20 ("DOLIUM") was assumed to be the conch of a large sea snail, such as Tonna dolium or some Eudolium or Charonia species. One such conch was found at Phaistos and is believed to have been used as a musical instrument for ritual uses.

=== Sign distribution ===
The distribution of symbols is highly non-random, and quite different between the two sides. Evans's symbol 02 (PLUMED HEAD) is the most frequent one, occurring 19 times—14 of them on side A. The next most frequent signs are 07 (HELMET), with 18 occurrences, mostly on side B; 12 (SHIELD), with 17, mostly on side A; and 27 (HIDE), with 15, of which 10 on side A.

Still, 26 of the 45 symbols occur on both sides, at least once on each. The most common signs that occur on only one side are 31 (EAGLE), on side A, and 22 (SLING), on side B; both with five occurrences each.

The following table shows how many distinct signs (Sign count) have the same number of occurrences (Frequency). The third number in each column is the product of the two numbers above, that is, the total number of occurrences (Token count) of those signs:

Frequency	19	18	17	16	15	14	13	12	11	10	9	8	7	6	5	4	3	2	1	
Sign count	1	1	1		1			1	4				1	6	3	6	3	8	9	Total = 45 signs
Token count	19	18	17		15			12	44				7	36	15	24	9	16	9	Total = 241 tokens

The nine hapaxes (symbols occurring just once) are 04 (A5), 05 (B3), 11 (A13), 15 (B8), 17 (A24), 30 (B27), 42 (B9), 43 (B4), 44 (A7). Of the eight twice-occurring symbols, four (03, 21, 28, 41) occur on side A only, three (09, 16, 20) on side B only, and only one (14) occurs on both sides.

=== Sign correlations ===
The distribution of symbol pairs too is highly non-uniform. For example, of the 17 occurrences of sign 12 (SHIELD), thirteen follow immediately sign 02 (PLUMED HEAD).

== Text ==
The following is a single image of the text "unrolled". While the order of the characters is left-to-right reversed, the signs themselves are in the original orientation.

Unrolled and left-to-right reversed image of the text.

=== Directionality ===
Evans, at one point, published an assertion that the disc had been written, and should be read, from the center out, because it would have been easiest to place the inscription first and then size the disc to fit the text. There is general agreement that he was wrong, and Evans himself later changed his mind: the inscription was made, and should be read, in the clockwise sense, from the outside in toward the center, as with the similar spiral inscription on the Lead Plaque of Magliano.

=== "Words" ===
The signs are laid out on each side as a single spiral text, which is split by the inscribed radial strokes into groups. These groups are conventionally called "words", even though their true linguistic or other nature is not known. Both ends of the text on each side are also assumed to be "word" boundaries. There are 61 such "words" on the Disc, with two to seven sign occurrences each: 31 on side A and 30 on side B. These "words" are conventionally numbered A1 to A31 and B1 to B30, reading from right to left (clockwise, edge-to-center).

There may be one additional radial stroke near the center of side A, over-stamped by the sign 03 (TATTOOED HEAD), between sign 10 (ARROW) and the central sign 38 (ROSETTE). However, most scholars ignore that possible stroke and count the last three symbols as a single "word" 10-03-38 (which happens to occur also at about the same position on the next-to-last turn).

On both sides, there is a radial line also right before the start (outermost end) of the text, with five dots punched along it using a sharp round stylus.

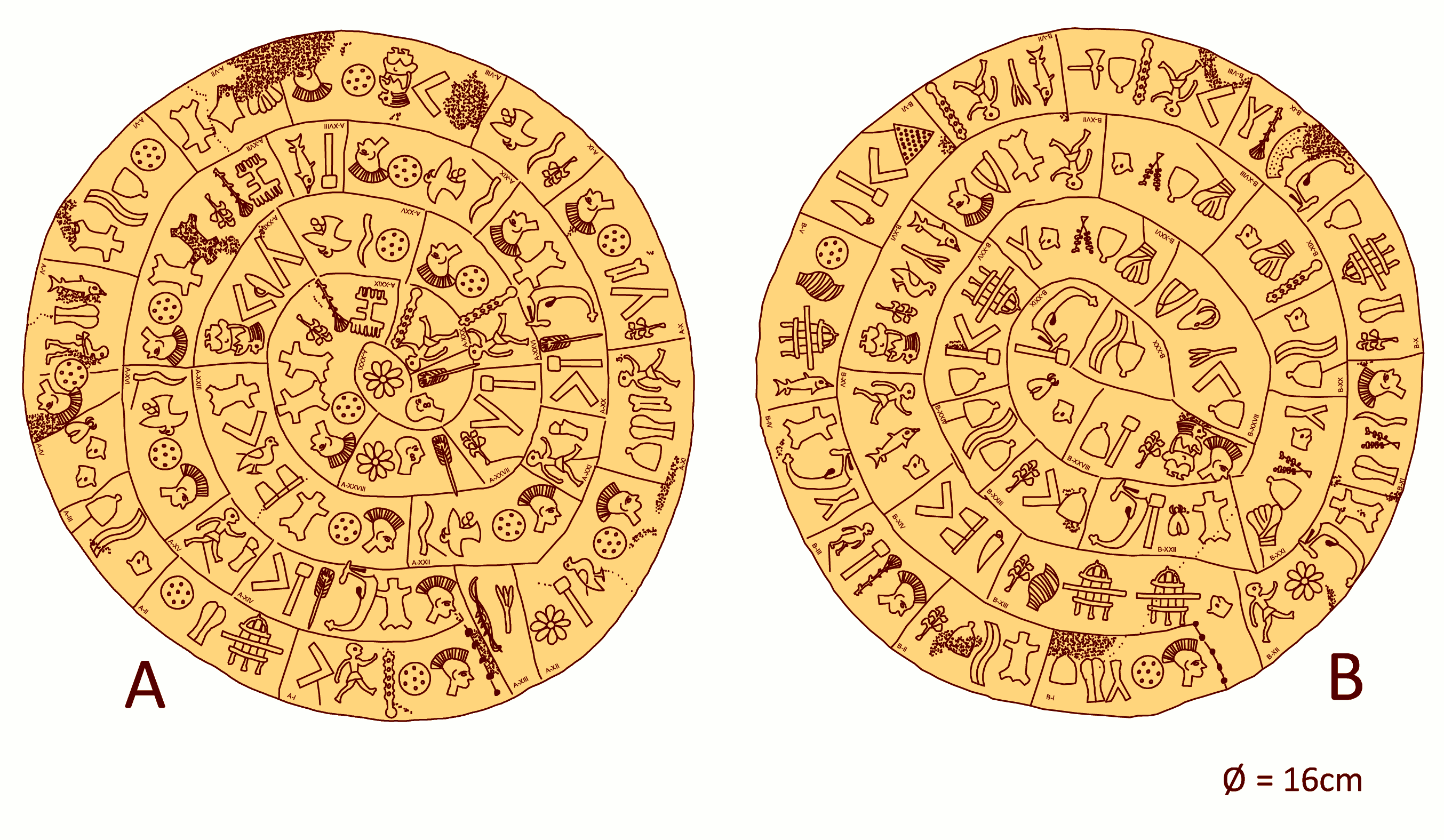
Fields numbering by Louis Godart

=== "Paragraphs" ===
The short oblique strokes that were drawn with a stylus (not stamped) below some signs are always attached to the last sign of a "word" (assuming outside-in reading direction). Their meaning is a matter of discussion. One hypothesis, supported by Evans, is that they further subdivide the text into "paragraphs".

=== Transcriptions ===
The following transcriptions of the text all assume a right-to-left (clockwise, edge-to-center) reading direction on the disc, starting at the vertical (radial) line of five dots. In these transcription, however, the order of the characters has been flipped, so that they should be read left-to-right and top-to-bottom. The oblique stroke is assumed to indicate the last word of a "paragraph". A horizontal line has been added after each "paragraph" for clarity.

For consistency with most published sources, these transcriptions assume that there is an oblique stroke at the end of word A24, even though high-resolution images show it to be just a crack.

==== Unicode ====
The following is a rendering of the Phaistos Disc inscription in Unicode characters from the Phaistos code block (code points +101D0 to +101FC). The radial strokes are denoted by the ASCII character "|" (+7C), and the oblique subscripted stroke by the comma-like PHAISTOS DISK COMBINING OBLIQUE STROKE (+101FD) after the affected symbol. The radial stroke with five dots, that indicates the presumed start of text, is denoted by the ISO Latin 1 character "¦" (+A6). The boxed question mark "⍰" (+2370) denotes the illegible sign in word A8. The appearance of the signs will depend on the font used by the browser, but normally they should all be left-to-right flipped relative to their appearance on the disc.

Side A:

¦ 𐇑𐇛𐇜𐇐𐇡𐇽

| 𐇧𐇷𐇛 | 𐇬𐇼𐇖𐇽

| 𐇬𐇬𐇱 | 𐇑𐇛𐇓𐇷𐇰 | 𐇪𐇼𐇖𐇛 | 𐇪𐇻𐇗 | 𐇑𐇛𐇕𐇡⍰ | 𐇮𐇩𐇲 | 𐇑𐇛𐇸𐇢𐇲 | 𐇐𐇸𐇷𐇖 | 𐇑𐇛𐇯𐇦𐇵𐇽

| 𐇶𐇚 | 𐇑𐇪𐇨𐇙𐇦𐇡 | 𐇫𐇐𐇽

| 𐇑𐇛𐇮𐇩𐇽

| 𐇑𐇛𐇪𐇪𐇲𐇴𐇤 | 𐇰𐇦 | 𐇑𐇛𐇮𐇩𐇽

| 𐇑𐇪𐇨𐇙𐇦𐇡 | 𐇫𐇐𐇽

| 𐇑𐇛𐇮𐇩𐇽

| 𐇑𐇛𐇪𐇝𐇯𐇡𐇪 | 𐇕𐇡𐇠𐇢𐇽

| 𐇮𐇩𐇛 | 𐇑𐇛𐇜𐇐 | 𐇦𐇢𐇲𐇽

| 𐇙𐇒𐇵 | 𐇑𐇛𐇪𐇪𐇲𐇴𐇤 | 𐇜𐇐 | 𐇙𐇒𐇵

Side B

¦ 𐇑𐇛𐇥𐇷𐇖 | 𐇪𐇼𐇖𐇲 | 𐇑𐇴𐇦𐇔𐇽

| 𐇥𐇨𐇪 | 𐇰𐇧𐇣𐇛 | 𐇟𐇦𐇡𐇺𐇽

| 𐇜𐇐𐇶𐇰 | 𐇞𐇖𐇜𐇐𐇡 | 𐇥𐇴𐇹𐇨 | 𐇖𐇧𐇷𐇲 | 𐇑𐇩𐇳𐇷 | 𐇪𐇨𐇵𐇐 | 𐇬𐇧𐇧𐇣𐇲 | 𐇟𐇝𐇡 | 𐇬𐇰𐇐 | 𐇕𐇲𐇯𐇶𐇰 | 𐇑𐇘𐇪𐇐 | 𐇬𐇳𐇖𐇗𐇽

| 𐇬𐇗𐇜 | 𐇬𐇼𐇖𐇽

| 𐇥𐇬𐇳𐇖𐇗𐇽

| 𐇪𐇱𐇦𐇨 | 𐇖𐇡𐇲 | 𐇖𐇼𐇖𐇽

| 𐇖𐇦𐇡𐇧 | 𐇥𐇬𐇳𐇖𐇗𐇽

| 𐇘𐇭𐇶𐇡𐇖 | 𐇑𐇕𐇲𐇦𐇖 | 𐇬𐇱𐇦𐇨 | 𐇼𐇖𐇽

==== Pictorial ====
The following transcription uses modern drawings of the signs, which are left-to-right reversed with respect to their appearance on the disc. The labels A1-A31 and B1-B30 are the traditional word numbers.

Side A:

^{A1}

^{A2} ^{A3}

^{A4} ^{A5} ^{A6} ^{A7} ^{A8} ^{A9} ^{A10} ^{A11} ^{A12}

^{A13} ^{A14} ^{A15}

^{A16}

^{A17} ^{A18} ^{A19}

^{A20} ^{A21}

^{A22}

^{A23} ^{A24}

^{A25} ^{A26} ^{A27}

^{A28} ^{A29} ^{A30} ^{A31}

Side B:

^{B1} ^{B2} ^{B3}

^{B4} ^{B5} ^{B6}

^{B7} ^{B8} ^{B9} ^{B10} ^{B11} ^{B12} ^{B13} ^{B14} ^{B15} ^{B16} ^{B17} ^{B18}

^{B19} ^{B20}

^{B21}

^{B22} ^{B23} ^{B24}

^{B25} ^{B26}

^{B27} ^{B28} ^{B29} ^{B30}

==== Numerical ====
The following transcription uses the Evans numbers for the signs. The vertical bar characters "¦" and "|" represent the start-of-text and word-separating radial lines, respectively. The slash "/" denotes the oblique stroke under the preceding sign. The caret "^" indicates the transition from the first turn of the text (along the disc's edge) to the inner turns, and "??" is the unreadable sign.

Side A:

¦ 02 12 13 01 18/

| 24 40 12 | 29 45 07/

| 29 29 34 | 02 12 04 40 33 | 27 45 07 12 | 27 44 08 | 02 12 06 18 ?? | 31 26 35 | 02 12 41 19 35 | 01 41 40 07 | 02 12 32 23 38/

| 39 11 | ^ 02 27 25 10 23 18 | 28 01/

| 02 12 31 26/

| 02 12 27 27 35 37 21 | 33 23 | 02 12 31 26/

| 02 27 25 10 23 18 | 28 01/

| 02 12 31 26/

| 02 12 27 14 32 18 27 | 06 18 17 19/

| 31 26 12 | 02 12 13 01 | 23 19 35/

| 10 03 38 | 02 12 27 27 35 37 21 | 13 01 | 10 03 38

Side B

¦ 02 12 22 40 07 | 27 45 07 35 | 02 37 23 05/

| 22 25 27 | 33 24 20 12 | 16 23 18 43/

| 13 01 39 33 | 15 07 13 01 18 | 22 37 42 25 | 07 24 40 35 | 02 26 36 40 | 27 25 38 01 | 29 ^ 24 24 20 35 | 16 14 18 | 29 33 01 | 06 35 32 39 33 | 02 09 27 01 | 29 36 07 08/

| 29 08 13 | 29 45 07/

| 22 29 36 07 08/

| 27 34 23 25 | 07 18 35 | 07 45 07/

| 07 23 18 24 | 22 29 36 07 08/

| 09 30 39 18 07 | 02 06 35 23 07 | 29 34 23 25 | 45 07/

=== Corrections ===
The disc shows signs of corrections having been made, with some signs erased and over-printed by other signs.

Godart describes these corrections as occurring in the following words: A1 (signs 02-12-13-01), A4 (29-29-34) together with A5 (02-12-04), A8 (12), A10 (02-41-19?-35), A12 (12), A16 (12-31-26?), A17 (second 27?), A29 (second 27?), B1 (12-22), B3 (37?), B4 (22-25 imprinted over the same), B10 (07?-24?-40?), B13 (beside 29?). Question marks indicate uncertainty about that particular sign being the result of a correction.

The borders of word B28 were also widened to make room for sign 02.

=== Sign rotations ===
The two signs 27 (HIDE) in word A29 are rotated 180 degrees compared with all other occurrences of this sign: "head down" versus "head up". This rotation might be motivated by lack of space in A29.

Arie Cate observed that if signs rotations were random with uniform distribution, then the probability that they end up in only two (or three) signs is very small.

=== Signs in adjacent windings ===
There are several locations on side A where two occurrences of the same sign lie near each other in adjacent turns of the spiral, such as sign 02 (PLUMED HEAD) in word A1 and in word A14. Also the two 27 signs (HIDE) signs in word A29 are upside down, with the "heads" pointing to the HIDE sign of word A23, in the adjacent turn. Arie Cate claims that the probability of these alignments being coincidental is rather small.

== Origin of the artifact ==
For the first few decades after its discovery most scholars argued strongly against the local origin of the artifact. Evans wrote that:

...when one comes to compare the figures in detail with those of the Minoan hieroglyphic signary, very great discrepancy is observable... Out of the forty-five separate signs on the Phaistos Disk, no more than ten more or less resemble Cretan hieroglyphic forms... The human figures in their outline and costume are non-Minoan... The representation of the ship also differs from all similar designs that occur either among the hieroglyphic or the linear documents of Crete.

Gustave Glotz claimed that the clay was not from Crete. Ipsen concluded that the disc was certainly from somewhere on the Aegean; however, because of its differences from Linear A or B, he, like Evans, supported a non-Cretan origin for the Disc. He observes, however, that since Linear A was a common Aegean script such an assumption will not resolve the problem of multiplicity.

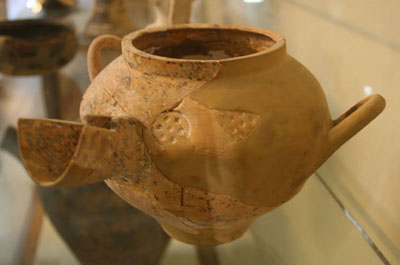
Vase from Knossos with a stamped sign similar to SHIELD.

However, the consensus on this question changed in later decades, as a few other artifacts were found on Crete with significant resemblances to the disc. For instance, a vase found at Knossos (Vase 14 236) bears a stamped sign identical to the disc's 25 SHIELD sign (a circle with seven dots). Also, under the bottom of a bowl found in 1965 at Phaistos (bowl F 4718 from the House South of the Ramp) there is a sign in relief, believed to be a potter's mark, that is practically identical to sign 21 (COMB). A very similar sign is found as an impression on a sealing from a deposit of administrative documents discovered in 1955, beneath Room 25 of the Second Palace of Phaistos (sealing CMS II.5, n. 246). Female images with pendulous breasts have also been found at Malia and Phaistos.The Arkalochori Axe also bears a short inscription that uses several signs similar to those of the disc.

These and other finds have made Cretan origin more popular. This view was expressed by Michael Trauth in 1990, Yves Duhoux in 2000 and Andrew Robinson in 2008.

== Hoax hypothesis ==
The uniqueness of the script, of the spiral arrangement, and of the method of writing (individual glyph stamps) have led some scholars to raise the possibility that the Phaistos disc is a 1908 forgery or hoax. It was pointed out that the date of manufacture has never been established by thermoluminescence dating. Andrew Robinson concurs that thermoluminescence dating would be highly desirable, but does not endorse the forgery arguments. Parallels with several Minoan objects discovered after the Phaistos disc all suggest the disc's authenticity: for instance between the "comb" (sign 21) and symbols discovered on a sealing in 1955 and a bowl in 1965; between the spiral layout and that of a ring discovered in 1926 at Knossos; and with several signs known from fragments of Impressed Fine Ware from Phaistos.

== Decipherment attempts ==
A great deal of speculation developed around the disc during the 20th century, particularly capturing the imagination of amateur archeologists. Many attempts have been made to decipher the code behind the disc's signs, with a wide variety of theories having been suggested, including prayers, a narrative or an adventure story, a "psalterion", a call to arms, a board game, and a geometric theorem; some of these theories are considered to be pseudoarchaeology, with little realistic chance of being accurate.

Most linguistic interpretations assume a syllabary, based on the proportion of 45 symbols in a text of 241 tokens typical for that type of script; some assume a syllabary with interspersed logographic symbols, a property of every known syllabary of the Ancient Near East (Linear B as well as cuneiform and hieroglyphic writing). There are, however, also alphabetic and purely logographical interpretations.

While enthusiasts still believe the mystery can be solved, scholarly attempts at decipherment are thought to be unlikely to succeed unless more examples of the signs turn up elsewhere, as it is generally thought that there is not enough context available for meaningful analysis. Any decipherment without external confirmation, such as successful comparison to other inscriptions, is unlikely to be accepted as conclusive.

=== Comparison with other scripts ===
While the Phaistos disc writing system is, on the whole, very different from other known scripts, several scholars have argued against it being an entirely independent invention. Gunther Ipsen argued that the creator must have been influenced by other scripts, and points out the Hieroglyphic Luwian script from Anatolia as an example of an original script inspired by other writing systems (its symbol values inspired by cuneiform, its shapes by Egyptian hieroglyphs).

Several scholars have proposed that the Phaistos signs are older or alternate forms of Linear A glyphs, specifically. Others have pointed to similar resemblances with the Anatolian (Luwian) hieroglyphs, or with Egyptian hieroglyphs. More remote possibilities are the Phoenician abjad or the Byblos syllabary.

==== Linear A ====
Comparison of the disc's signs with those of Linear A inscriptions go back to Evans in 1909. In 1959, Benjamin Schwartz asserted a genetic relationship between the Phaistos Disc script and the Cretan linear scripts. Similar claims were made also by Werner Nahm in 1975, Torsten Timm in 2004, and others.

Some of these proposals point to similarities between some glyphs, such as 12 (SHIELD), 43 (STRAINER), and 31 (EAGLE) to both Linear A and Linear B characters, and conjecture that they may have the same phonetic values—respectively 'qe', 'ta', and 'ku'. Based on the Linear A character distribution patterns collected by Giulio Facchetti, Torsten Timm goes as far as identifying 20 of the 45 characters with Linear A/B signs.

==== Anatolian hieroglyphs ====
Parallels between the Phaistos disc script and Anatolian hieroglyphs were proposed, among others, by S. Davis in 1961 and Jan Best and Fred Woudhuizen in 1988. In 2004, Winfried Achterberg and others proposed an extensive mapping to Anatolian hieroglyphs, which led them to a full decipherment claim. The third revised and extended edition of the authors' monograph on the subject was published in 2021.

== Summary table ==
The following table summarizes the proposed identifications of Phaistos signs with Linear A, the Arkalochori Axe glyphs, and Luwian hieroglyphs:

No.	Sign	Linear A	Arkalochori Axe	Luwian hieroglyphs
01	01			'SARU'
02	02		04,07,10	'A_{2}'
10	10	AB79 'ZU'		
11	11			'SOL SUUS'
12	12	AB78 'QE'		'TURPI'
15	15	A364 B232		
16	16	AB74 'ZE' ?		
17	17	A322		
18	18	AB37 'TI'		
19	19	AB31 'SA'	11	
22	22	A318		
23	23	AB05 'TO' or AB06 'NA'	13	
24	24	AB54 'WA'		
25	25	AB86		
29	29	AB80 'MA'	08	
30	30	AB13 'ME', AB85?		
31	31	AB81 'KU'		
34	34	AB39 'PI'		
35	35	AB04 'TE'	09	
36	36	AB30 'NI'		
39	39	AB28 'I'	02	'TARHUNT'
40	40	AB26 'RU' or AB27 'RE'		
43	43	AB66 'TA_{2}'		
45	45	AB76 'RA_{2}'		

== List of decipherment claims ==
Decipherment claims can be categorized into linguistic decipherments, identifying the language of the inscription, and non-linguistic decipherments. A purely logographical reading is not linguistic in the strict sense: while it may reveal the meaning of the inscription, it will not allow for the identification of the underlying language.

=== Linguistic ===
Unless said otherwise, the attempts below assumed the right-to-left (clockwise, edge-to-center) reading direction, starting with side A.

- George Hempl, 1911: interpretation as Ionic Greek, syllabic writing.
- Florence Stawell, 1911: interpretation as Homeric Greek, syllabic writing; B-side first.
- Albert Cuny, 1914: interpretation as an ancient Egyptian document, syllabic-logographic writing.
- Benjamin Schwartz, 1959: interpretation as Mycenean Greek, syllabic writing, comparison to Linear B.
- Jean Faucounau, 1975: interpretation as "proto-Ionic" Greek, syllabic writing.
- Vladimir I. Georgiev, 1976: interpretation as Hittite language, syllabic writing; reading outward.
- Steven R. Fischer, 1988: interpretation as a Greek dialect, syllabic writing.
- Kjell Aartun, 1992: interpretation as a Semitic language, syllabic writing; reading outward.
- Derk Ohlenroth, 1996: interpretation as a Greek dialect, alphabetic writing; reading outward; numerous homophonic signs.
- Adam Martin, 2000: interpretation as a Greek-Minoan bilingual text, alphabetic writing; reading outward, side A as Greek, side B as Minoan.
- Achterberg et al., 2004: interpreted as Luwian.
- Torsten Timm, 2005: syllabic writing, comparison to Linear A; B-side first.
- Gareth Alun Owens, 2007: interpretation as Indo-European, syllabic writing, comparison to Linear A.

=== Non-linguistic or logographic ===
- Harald Haarmann, 1990: interpretation as logographic writing.
- Helène Whittaker, 2005: a votive miniature version of a game board similar to the Egyptian Mehen.

== Unicode ==
A set of 46 symbols from the Phaistos Disc, comprising Evans's 45 signs and one combining oblique stroke, have been encoded in Unicode since April 2008 (Unicode version 5.1). They are assigned to the range 101D0–101FF in Plane 1 (the Supplementary Multilingual Plane). These characters were encoded with strong left-to-right directionality, and so in code charts and text (such as elsewhere on this page) the glyphs are mirrored from the way they appear on the disc itself.

Phaistos Disc^{[1]}^{[2]} Official Unicode Consortium code chart (PDF)
	0	1	2	3	4	5	6	7	8	9	A	B	C	D	E	F
U+101Dx	𐇐	𐇑	𐇒	𐇓	𐇔	𐇕	𐇖	𐇗	𐇘	𐇙	𐇚	𐇛	𐇜	𐇝	𐇞	𐇟
U+101Ex	𐇠	𐇡	𐇢	𐇣	𐇤	𐇥	𐇦	𐇧	𐇨	𐇩	𐇪	𐇫	𐇬	𐇭	𐇮	𐇯
U+101Fx	𐇰	𐇱	𐇲	𐇳	𐇴	𐇵	𐇶	𐇷	𐇸	𐇹	𐇺	𐇻	𐇼	𐇽		
Notes 1.As of Unicode version 17.0 2.Grey areas indicate non-assigned code points

== Modern use ==
Side A of the Phaistos Disc is used as the logo of FORTH, one of the largest research centers in Greece.

== See also ==
- Lead Plaque of Magliano
- Arkalochori Axe
- Cretan hieroglyphs
- Linear A
