= Byblos bronze spatulas =

Ancient bronze artifacts found in Byblos

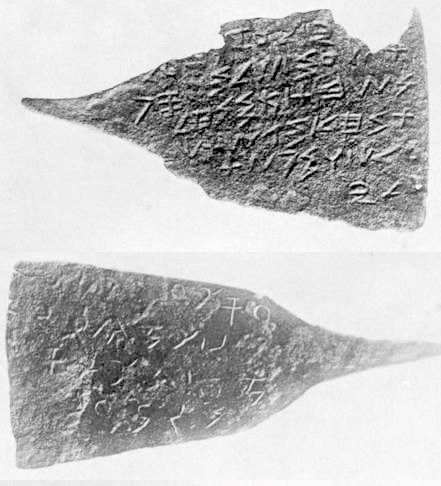
The two inscribed Byblos bronze spatulas

The Byblos bronze spatulas are a number bronze spatulas found in Byblos, two of which were inscribed. One contains a Phoenician inscription (known as the Azarba'al Spatula, KAI 3 or TSSI III 1) and one contains an inscription in the Byblos syllabary.

They were published in Maurice Dunand's Fouilles de Byblos (volume I, 1926–1932, numbers 1125 and 2334, plate XXXII).

== Spatulas ==
The spatulas discovered in Dunand's Fouilles de Byblos volume I are as follows:

=== Inscribed ===
- 1125 (the Azarba'al Spatula) Large bronze spatula with a short stalk (9.5 x 5.6cm). Phoenician inscription of six lines on one side. On the other side, some chisel test marks. Published separately in 1938 as Spatule de bronze avec épigraphe phénicienne du XIII^{e} siècle (now dated to the tenth century). Text of the inscription:

(1)	[...]Y L'ZRB'L	[...] to Azarba'al
(2)	TŠ'M Š<Q>LM KSP	ninety she<q>els of silver.
(3)	NŠBT 'M NḤL	Let us share. If you inher-
(4)	TNḤL MGŠTK	it (obtain) it, your portion
(5)	'LK WMGŠT	will be yours, and my portion
(6)	'LY	shall be mine.

- 2334. Bronze spatula (7 x 4.5cm), similar to no. 1125. Inscribed in the Byblos syllabary. Vertical lines apparently separate the words, as in archaic Phoenician inscriptions.

=== Uninscribed ===
- 1345 Small bronze spatula (6.5 x 1.5mm), badly ruined
- 2333 Bronze spatula (10.5 x 4.4cm), similar to no. 1125 but without inscription
- 3227. Narrow triangular spatula (8 x 2cm), in bronze
- 3313 Bronze spatula (7.7 x 2.6cm), with square stem

== Bibliography ==
- Dunand, Maurice, 'Spatule de bronze avec épigraphe phénicienne du XIII^{e} [actually: X^{e}] siècle', in: Bulletin du Musée de Beyrouth 2 (1938) 99–107.
- B. Donnelly-Lewis (2021), The Azarba'al Spatula (KAI 3), A Debt Receipt from Ancient Byblos: Linguistic Notes for a New Translation and Interpretation, Semitica
- Shea, W. H. 1977 The Byblos Spatula Inscription, JAOS 97.2: 164-170
- Ranck, T. E. 1973 The Byblos Spatula, an Ancient Bribe or Peace Offering. Australian Journal of Biblical Archaeology 2: 45-50
- P. Kyle McCarter, Jr. and Robert B. Coote, "The Spatula Inscription from Byblos," BASOR 212 (1973): 19-21
- Christopher Rollston, "The Dating of the Early Royal Byblian Phoenician Inscriptions: A Response to Benjamin Sass." MAARAV 15 (2008): 57–93.
- Benjamin Mazar, The Phoenician Inscriptions from Byblos and the Evolution of the Phoenician-Hebrew Alphabet, in The Early Biblical Period: Historical Studies (S. Ahituv and B. A. Levine, eds., Jerusalem: IES, 1986 [original publication: 1946]): 231–247.
- William F. Albright, The Phoenician Inscriptions of the Tenth Century B.C. from Byblus, JAOS 67 (1947): 153–154.
