= Proto-Ionians =

The Proto-Ionians are the hypothetical earliest speakers of the Ionic dialects of Ancient Greek, chiefly in the works of Jean Faucounau. The relation of Ionic to the other Greek dialects has been subject to some debate. It is mostly grouped with Arcadocypriot as opposed to Doric, reflecting two waves of migration into Greece following the Proto-Greek period, but sometimes also as separate from Arcadocypriot on equal footing with Doric, suggesting three distinct waves of migration.

== Position of Ionic Greek ==
Mainstream Greek linguistics separates the Greek dialects into two large genetic groups, one including Doric Greek and the other including both Arcadocypriot and Ionic Greek. But alternative approaches proposing three groups are not uncommon; Thumb and Kieckers (1932) propose three groups, classifying Ionic as genetically just as separate from Arcadocypriot as from Doric. Like a few other linguists (Vladimir Georgiev, C. J. Rhuijgh, Pierre Lévêque, etc.), the bipartite classification is known as the "Risch–Chadwick theory", named after its two famous proponents, Ernst Risch and John Chadwick.

The "Proto-Ionians" first appear in the work of Ernst Curtius (1887), who believed that the Attic-Ionic dialect group was due to an "Ionicization" of Attica by immigration from Ionia in historical times. Curtius hypothesized that there had been a "Proto-Ionian" migration from the Balkans to western Anatolia in the same period that brought the Arcadic dialect (the successor of the Mycenean Greek stage yet undiscovered in the time of Curtius) to mainland Greece. Curtius' hypothesis was endorsed by George Hempl in 1920. Hempl preferred to call these hypothetical, early Anatolian Greeks "Javonians". Hempl attempted to defend a reading of Hittite cuneiform as Greek, in spite of the establishment of the Hittite language as a separate branch of Indo-European by Bedřich Hrozný in 1917.

== Faucounau ==
The tripartite theory was revived by amateur linguist Jean Faucounau. In his view, the first Greek settlers in their historical territory were the (Pelasgic) "proto-Ionians", who were separated around 3000 BC from both the proto-Dorians and the proto-Mycenaeans. Faucounau traces this three-wave model to similar views put forward by Paul Kretschmer in the 1890s and the 1900s (i.e., before the decipherment of Linear B), with a modification: the (proto-Ionic) First wave came by sea, the "Proto-Ionians" settling first in the Cycladic Islands, then in Euboea and Attica. The last two waves are the generally accepted arrival of the Mycenaean Greeks (the linguistic predecessors of the Arcadocypriot speakers) in around 1700 BC and the Dorian invasion around 1100 BC.

Following Georgiev, Faucounau makes three arguments for the proto-Ionic language. The first is the explanation of certain Mycenaean forms as loan-words from the proto-Ionians already present in Greece: he asserts that digamma is unexpectedly absent from some Mycenaean words, the occasional resolution of Indo-European vocalic r to -or/ro- instead of -ar/ra-; to-pe-za for τράπεζα, and the explanation of Mycenaean pa-da-yeu as Greek παδάω/πηδάω, "spring leap, bound", which he interprets as both cognate with, and having the same meaning as, English paddle.

The second argument is a refinement of a long-established argument in archaeoastronomy, developed most recently by Michael Ovenden, which considers the motion of the North Pole with respect to the fixed stars, because of the precession of the equinoxes. Ovenden concluded, from the slant of the constellations in the present sky and the hypothesis that Aratus and Hipparchus (insofar as his work survives) correctly and completely represent immemorial tradition, that the constellations we now use had been devised when the Pole was in Draco, about 2800 BC. He also concluded that the inventors probably lived between 34°30' and 37°30' N., north of most ancient civilizations, and so were likely to be the Minoans.

Dr. Crommelin, FRAS, has disputed this latitude, arguing that the constellation makers could only see to 54° S, but that this was compatible with latitudes as low as the 31°N of Alexandria; stars which only skirt the southern horizon by a few degrees are not effectively visible. Assuming a Greek latitude would render Canopus and Fomalhaut invisible. Crommelin estimates the constellators at 2460 BC; R. A. Proctor has estimated 2170 BC. E. W. Maunder 2700 BC.

Faucounau's addition to this is the argument that Crete is also too far south, that the names of the constellations are (Ionic) Greek, not Minoan, and therefore that the constellation makers must be the proto-Ionians in the Cyclades. The south coast of Crete follows 35°N latitude; Syros, which he identifies as a center of proto-Ionian civilization, is at 37°20'. On this basis, he identifies the proto-Ionians with the archaeological Early Cycladic II culture: after all, they made round "frying pans," and one of them with an incised spiral, and the Phaistos Disc is round with an incised spiral.

His third argument depends on Herodotus's somewhat obscure use of the word Pelasgian for various peoples, Greek-speaking and otherwise, around the Aegean basin. Faucounau claims that the word, which he derives idiosyncratically from πελαγος, "sea", means the descendants of the proto-Ionians. Some of them lost their language because they settled among foreigners; others, such as the Athenians, preserved their language - Attic, apparently, arises from a mixture of proto-Ionian and other dialects. He does not explain why Homer speaks of Dodona, inland in north-western Greece, as Pelasgian (Il, 16,233); nor why no place in historic Ionia is called Pelasgian.

He adds to the above arguments with archaeological facts. For example, the Treaty of Alaksandu between Wilusa and the Hittite empire bore a Greek name at a time when there was no Mycenaean pottery at Troy. Faucounau considers that all these arguments are an indirect confirmation of his own decipherment claim of the Phaistos Disk as proto-Ionic.

Faucounau's "Proto-Ionic Disk Language" has most of the properties of Homeric Greek, including loss of labiovelars and even of digamma (both are preserved intact in the Mycenaean of the 14th century BC). Digamma, in Faucounau's reading of the Phaistos Disk, has in some instances passed to y, a sound shift not known from any other Greek dialect, but suspected in Ionic (e.g. Ion. païs v/etym. paus). For Faucounau, the Pelasgians, the Trojans, the Carians and the Philistines are all descended from the Proto-Ionians.

Faucounau's work on this subject has received two scholarly notices. Paul Faure, as below, writes warmly of many parts of the Proto-Ionian theory. He declines to address the decipherment, and omits the Celts; he also dates the Middle Cycladic culture only from 2700 BC, not 2900. Yves Duhoux expresses his disbelief in the decipherment, but does not mention the wider theory, except to deny that the Disc came from Syros. Faucounau's paper on the statistical problem of how many glyphs are likely to be omitted from a short text has never been cited. Most of it addresses the long-solved case in which the glyphs are equally likely.

== See also ==
- Pelasgians
- Greek dialects
- Dorian invasion
