= Benjamin Schwarz =

Benjamin Schwarz may refer to:

- Benjamin Schwarz (footballer) (born 1986), German footballer
- Benjamin Schwarz (writer) (born 1963), American magazine editor

== See also ==
- Benjamin Schwartz (disambiguation)
