= Archaeomythology =

Study of archaeology through the discipline of mythology

Archaeomythology refers to the study of archaeology through the discipline of mythology. It is an approach developed by Marija Gimbutas and mainly applied to Eastern European countries. Commenting in The Oxford Handbook of the Archaeology of Ritual and Religion, Tõnno Jonuks wrote "Despite stressing the importance of archaeology and using its sources to a greater extent than any other school in the Baltic countries, studies of archaeomythology are still based upon folklore and archaeology has only been used selectively. The greater part of archaeological material which could not be reconciled with folklore has been left out and many phenomena of past religions have thus not been discussed as they "cannot be compared with folklore."

Within the institute of Archaeomythology, the study itself can be defined as a "particular emphasis on the beliefs, rituals, social structure and symbolism of past and present societies." A reason explained for why there was a major focus of research regarding archaeomythology was centered on the "Neolithic cultures of Old Europe and the Indo-European Bronze Age societies that replaced them." Archaeomythology's interdisciplinary approach considers the aspect of mythology as a "valid part of cultural research," however it can also be shown as a record for myths of "what occurred in our distant history and are a traditional explanation of natural or social events." Within mythology, archaeology can rekindle life into the ancient folklore validating a hidden truth behind the story and reveal a dynamic portrait in human history as it can verify underlying truths as stated in the book Archaeomythology by Craig Kodros. This can range on a variety of different focuses, but mainly focusing on the human history and other remains through sites related to mythology. Moreover, a majority of the stories and places that are related to the topic of Archaeomythology are often referred to as being very sacred mythological stories. Within the sites and stories themselves, they are all most likely include aspects of "combines archaeology, mythology, ethnology, folklore, historical linguistics, comparative religion."

== See also ==
- Biblical archaeology
- Pseudoarchaeology
- Nationalist historiography
- Indigenous archaeology
- Euhemerism
- Thor Heyerdahl
