= Benjamin Schwartz (linguist) =

American linguist (died 1981)

Benjamin Schwartz (died 1981) was an American linguist, specializing in ancient languages and texts from the Middle East.

He taught for a time at Lincoln University in Pennsylvania. His main interests were Indoeuropean languages, Anatolian texts and languages (such as Hittite and Luwian), Judaeo-Greek hymns, and the Phaistos disk.

He died on December 26, 1981.
