= Harald Haarmann =

German linguist and cultural scientist (born 1946)

- Born: 16 April 1946 (age 80)
- Occupation: Linguist
- Spouse: Pirkko-Liisa Haarmann (died 31 May 2021)

Academic background
- Education: University of Hamburg
- Alma mater: University of Bonn

Harald Haarmann (born 16 April 1946) is a German linguist and cultural scientist who lives and works in Finland. Haarmann studied general linguistics, various philological disciplines and prehistory at the universities of Hamburg, Bonn, Coimbra and Bangor. He obtained his PhD in Bonn (1970) and his habilitation (qualification at professorship level) in Trier (1979). He taught and conducted research at a number of German and Japanese universities. He is Vice-President of the Institute of Archaeomythology (headquartered in Sebastopol, California) and director of its European branch (based in Luumäki, Finland).

Haarmann is the author of more than 80 books and more than 450 articles and essays. He has also edited and co-edited some 20 anthologies. Haarmann writes books in English and in German, and articles in various languages. Some of the books have been published in up to 17 languages. His preferred fields of study are cultural history, archaeomythology, history of writing, language evolution, contact linguistics and history of religion.

Among his theories is that the Danouios civilisation of ancient Europe had hieroglyphic writing.

== Selected bibliography ==
- 2023 - Die Erfindung des Rades: Als die Weltgeschichte ins Rollen kam. Beck Paperback 6497 978-3-406-79727-9
- 2023 - Kairos. Human Responses to the Flow of Time in the Dynamic Formation Process of Western Civilization, Hildesheim: Olms Verlag. ISBN 978-3-487-16442-7
- 2022 - Von Thera nach Atlantis. Die Geschichte hinter dem mythischen Inselreich. Marix Verlag, Wiesbaden. ISBN 978-3-7374-1192-9.
- 2021 - Sprache - Schrift - Kultur - Religion - Geschichte - Philosophie, Publikationen Harald Haarmann (1970-2020), Hildesheim: Olms Verlag. ISBN 978-3-487-16047-4.
- 2020 - Platons Musen. Philosophie im Licht weiblicher Intellektualität. Georg Olms Verlag, Hildesheim, Zürich. ISBN 978-3-487-15922-5.
- 2019 - Die Anfänge Roms, Wiesbaden: Marix Verlag. ISBN 978-3-7374-1117-2 .
- 2019 - Vergessene Kulturen der Weltgeschichte, München: C. H. Beck. ISBN 978-3-406-73410-6 .
- 2017 - Wer zivilisierte die Alten Griechen? Das Erbe der Alteuropäischen Hochkultur. Marix Verlag, Wiesbaden ISBN 978-3-7374-1065-6.
- 2016 - Plato's philosophy reaching beyond the limits of reason: contours of a contextual theory of truth'. Philosophische texte und studien, 121. Hildesheim; Zürich; New York: Olms-Weidmann. (376 p.) ISBN 978-3-487-15542-5.
- 2016 - Auf den Spuren der Indoeuropäer. Von den neolithischen Steppennomaden bis zu den frühen Hochkulturen. Munich: C.H. Beck. ISBN 978-3-406-68824-9.
- 2015 - Myth as source of knowledge in early western thought. The quest for historiography, science and philosophy in Greek antiquity. Wiesbaden: Harrassowitz, ISBN 978-3-447-10362-6.
- 2014 - Roots of ancient Greek civilization. The influence of Old Europe. Jefferson, North Carolina: McFarland. ISBN 978-0-7864-7827-9.
- 2013 - Ancient knowledge, ancient know-how, ancient reasoning. Cultural memory in transition from prehistory to classical antiquity and beyond. Amherst, New York: Cambria Press. ISBN 978-1-60497-852-0.
- 2013 - Mythos Demokratie. Antike Herrschaftsmodelle im Spannungsfeld von Egalitätsprinzip und Eliteprinzip. Frankfurt, Berlin, New York: Peter Lang. ISBN 978-3-631-62599-6.
- 2012 - Indo-Europeanization - day one. Elite recruitment and the beginnings of language politics. Wiesbaden: Harrassowitz. 978-3-447-06717-1.
- 2011 - Das Rätsel der Donauzivilisation. Die Entdeckung der ältesten Hochkultur Europas. Munich: C.H. Beck. ISBN 978-3-406-62210-6.
- 2011 - Europe's Mosaic of Languages, European History Online, Mainz: Institute of European History, retrieved: November 2, 2011.
- 2010 - Die Indoeuropäer. Herkunft, Sprachen, Kulturen [The Indo-Europeans. Origin, languages, cultures]. C.H. Beck knowledge, volume 2706. ISBN 978-3-406-60682-3
- 2009 - Interacting with figurines. Seven dimensions in the study of imagery. West Hartford, Vermont: Full Circle Press. ISBN 978-0-9790046-3-6
- 2008 (co-author Joan Marler) - Introducing the Mythological Crescent. Ancient beliefs and imagery connecting Eurasia with Anatolia. Wiesbaden: Harrassowitz. ISBN 978-3-447-05832-2
- 2008 - Weltgeschichte der Zahlen [World history of numbers]. Munich: C.H. Beck knowledge, volume 2450. ISBN 978-3-406-56250-1
- 2007 - Foundations of culture: Knowledge-construction, belief systems and worldview in their dynamic interplay. Frankfurt, Berlin, New York: Peter Lang. ISBN 978-3-631-56685-5
- 2006 - Weltgeschichte der Sprachen. Von der Frühzeit des Menschen bis zur Gegenwart [World history of languages. From the early period of humans up to the present]. Munich: Becksche Reihe, volume 1703. ISBN 3-406-55120-3
- 2005 - Encyclopaedia of extinct peoples. From Akkader to Zimbern. Munich: Becksche Reihe, volume 1643. ISBN 3-406-52817-1
- 2005 - Schwarz: Eine kleine Kulturgeschichte [Black: A brief cultural history]. Frankfurt, Berlin, New York: Peter Lang. ISBN 3-631-54188-0
- 2004 - Small encyclopaedia of peoples. From Aborigines to Zapotecs. Munich: Becksche Reihe, volume 1593. ISBN 3-406-51100-7
- 2004 - Elementary word order in the languages of the world. Documentation and analyses of the emergence of word order patterns. Hamburg: Helmut Buske. ISBN 3-87548-372-3
- 2003 - History of the deluge. In search of the early civilizations. Munich: Becksche Reihe, volume 1536. ISBN 3-406-49465-X (2nd ed. 2005)
- 2002 - Geschichte der Schrift [History of writing]. Munich: C.H. Beck knowledge, volume 2198. ISBN 3-406-47998-7 (2nd ed. 2004; 3rd ed. 2007)
- 2002 - Lexikon der untergegangenen Sprachen [Encyclopaedia of extinct languages]. Munich: Becksche Reihe, volume 1456. ISBN 3-406-47596-5 (2nd ed. 2004)
- 2002 - Sprachen-Almanach. Zahlen und Fakten zu allen Sprachen der Welt [Language yearbook. Numbers and facts about all languages of the world]. Frankfurt, New York: Campus. ISBN 3-593-36572-3
- 2001 - Small encyclopaedia of languages. From Albanian to Zulu. Munich: Becksche Reihe, volume 1432. ISBN 3-406-47558-2 (2nd ed. 2002)
- 2001 - Babylonian world. History and future of languages. Frankfurt, New York: Campus. ISBN 3-593-36571-5
- 2001 - The small languages of the world: Existential threats and chances of survival. A comprehensive documentation. Frankfurt, Berlin, New York: Peter Lang. ISBN 3-631-37173-X
- 1998 - Religion und Autorität. Der Weg des Gottes ohne Konkurrenz [Religion and authority. The way of the gods without competition]. Hildesheim: Olms. ISBN 3-487-10507-1
- 1996 - Die Madonna und ihre griechischen Töchter. Rekonstruktion einer kunturhistorischen Genealogie [The Madonna and her Greek daughters. Reconstruction of a cultural-historical genealogy]. Hildesheim: Olms. ISBN 3-487-10163-7
- 1995 - Early civilization and literacy in Europe. An inquiry into cultural continuity in the Mediterranean world. Berlin, New York: Mouton de Gruyter. ISBN 3-11-014651-7
- 1993 - The world of European languages. History and future of the language nations between Atlantic and the Urals. Frankfurt, New York: Campus. ISBN 3-593-34825-X
- 1990 - Universal history of writing. Frankfurt, New York: Campus. ISBN 3-593-34346-0 (4th ed. 1998)
