= Jan Best =

Dutch writer

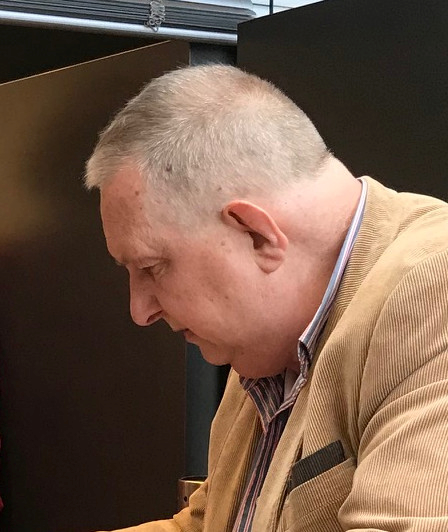
Jan Best

Jan Gijsbert Pieter Best (born 29 August 1941, Grou - 19 January 2023) was a Dutch pre- and protohistorian, comparative linguist, archaeologist, and author. For about 30 years, he was Professor at the University of Amsterdam, where he taught ancient history, and Mediterranean prehistory and protohistory.

== Education ==
In 1966, Best passed his graduate examinations in Classical Languages, achieving a major in Ancient History, along with minors in Greek and Latin. In 1969, he attained the doctorate with his thesis Thracian Peltasts and their Influence on Greek Warfare. Afterwards, he succeeded in his graduate examination in Archaeology, with a major in Cultural Pre- and Protohistory, and minors in Classical Archaeology and Provincial Roman Archaeology. In all of these three graduate programs, he graduated cum laude.

== Experience ==
From 1962 to 1991, Best worked in the University of Amsterdam, respectively as assistant classical archaeology, associate professor ancient history and coordinator of the study Mediterranean Pre- and Protohistory.

=== Dyadovo ===
Best also conducted several additional projects. These include his role, from 1975 to 1979, as a co-leader of the excavation of the settlement at Dyadovo (Djadovo, bg:Дядово), which is a Dutch-Bulgarian-Japanese UNESCO project in Bulgaria. According to Best, the excavations at this site showed that, around 3200 BC, a layer with a culture of matriarchal character (many 'goddess figurines' were found) was destroyed by fire. Then, over above an undisturbed natural deposition layer 30 to 40 cm deep, a settlement of livestock-herding nomadic culture-bearers from the steppes has been identified. This created a fusion of these two peoples, as is evident in the findings from the cemetery of Varna; this may have been the genesis of the ancient Thracian culture.

The Dyadovo Tell is one of the largest settlement mounds in Southeastern Europe. The excavations here started in 1977–1978. Since then, the Bulgarian and the Dutch archaeological teams continued the excavations; a Japanese team from Tokai University also participated later. The results revealed that the tell had been inhabited through most archaeological periods, including the Middle Ages, the Early Byzantine Period, the Roman Period, the Early Iron Age, the Bronze Age and the Copper Age.

From 1980 until 1984, Best was professor-secretary of the International Committee of Thracology 'Wilhelm Tomaschek' with the 'Association Internationale des Études Sud-Est-Européens' (Unesco-comité AIESEE).

During the eighties he was general advisor of the exhibitions 'The Gold of the Thracians' in Museum Boijmans Van Beuningen in Rotterdam (1984) and 'The Thracian Royal Treasure' in the Nieuwe Kerk (Amsterdam) (1989).

== Deciphering ancient scripts ==
Best is one of the initiators of Alverna Research Group which specialises in deciphering of so-far unknown scripts.

Along with his frequent coauthor Fred Woudhuizen (1959–2021), Best contributed to the understanding of the Linear A script, as well as of the Cretan hieroglyphs.

Best also offered a reading of the Cypro-Minoan script.

In 2009, after 40 years of research, he proposed a decipherment of the Byblos script. Reviews of his 2010 book Het Byblosschrift ontcijferd (The Byblos Script deciphered) were mixed. Best proposed that the syllabic Linear A Script from Crete had a number of Semitic characteristics. This idea encountered some resistance among his colleagues who were mainly trained in the classical languages.

=== Phaistos Disc ===
With coauthors, Best also offered the decipherment of the famous Phaistos Disc from the island of Crete. Jan Best and Fred Woudhuizen pointed out some significant parallels between the Phaistos disk script and the Anatolian hieroglyphs. They first published their findings in 1988.

== Author ==
In 1991 Best was co-founder and director of Najade Press, a publishing company issuing the international magazine Thamyris, Mythmaking from Past to Present. From 2001 onwards it is edited by publishing company Rodopi in the new series Thamyris, Intersecting, Place, Sex and Race. Best is an author since 1992. He writes travel books for Gottmer Publishers Group. In October 2010 his book Het Byblosschrift ontcijferd (The Byblos Syllabary deciphered) appeared with publishing company Bert Bakker.

== Bibliography ==
=== Books (selection) ===
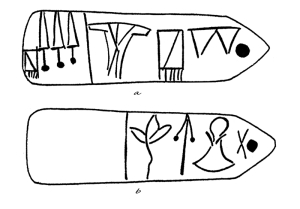
Clay label of king Muwa from Mallia (sector Mu). A = front, B = back. Image from Het Byblosschrift ontcijferd - In het voetspoor van Willem Glasbergen

- Winfried Achterberg, Jan Best, Kees Enzler, Lia Rietveld, Fred Woudhuizen 2021, The Phaistos Disc: A Luwian Letter to Nestor. Third revised and extended edition: 2021. Amsterdam. academia.edu
- with Winfried Achterberg, Kees Enzler, Lia Rietveld, Fred Woudhuizen The Phaistos Disc: A Luwian Letter to Nestor (Harrassowitz), Wiesbaden 2011
- Het Byblosschrift ontcijferd - In het voetspoor van Willem Glasbergen 2010 (ISBN 9789035136007)
- Best, Jan; Woudhuizen, Fred (1988). Ancient Scripts from Crete and Cyprus. Leiden: E.J. Brill. pp. 98–131. ISBN 90-04-08431-2.
- Terug tot Homerus: Een zoektocht naar Nestor (Heureka), Weesp 1994
- with Flemming Kaul, Ivan Marazov, Nanny de Vries Thracian Tales on the Gundestrup Cauldron (Najade Press), Amsterdam 1991
- with Sibylle von Reden Auf der Spur der ersten Griechen-Woher kamen die Mykener?: Neue archäologische Erkenntnisse über die Herkunft der Griechen (DuMont), Köln 1981
- Co-writer travelbooks Bulgaria, Sweden, Norway, Denmark, Dordogne/Limousin, in the Dominicus-series (1991-)

=== Other publications (selection) ===
- Best, Jan and De Vries, Nanny. Thracians and Mycenaeans. Boston, MA: E.J. Brill Academic Publishers, 1989. ISBN 90-04-08864-4.
- Suruya in the Byblos Corpus, Ugarit-Forschungen 40 (2009), 135-41
- Breaking the Code of the Byblos Script, Ugarit-Forschungen 40 (2009), 129-33
- Reconstructing the Linear A Syllabary, Ugarit-Forschungen 38 (2006), 53-62
- The First Inscription in Punic: Vowel Differences between Linear A and B, Ugarit-Forschungen 32: In memoriam Cyrus H. Gordon (2000)
- The Ancient Toponyms of Mallia: A post-Eurocentric reading of Egyptianising Bronze Age documents, Black Athena: Ten Years Afters (= Talanta 28-29/1996-1997, red. Wim M.J. van Binsbergen), 99-129
- Linguistic Evidence for a Phoenician Pillar Cult in Crete, The Journal of the Ancient Near Eastern Society 20 (1991), 7-13
- various articles in national and international magazines in his working fields, since 1972 mainly in the fields of Thracology and decipherment of ancient scripts (1962-)
