= Byblos syllabary =

Undeciphered Bronze Age script

Byblos script
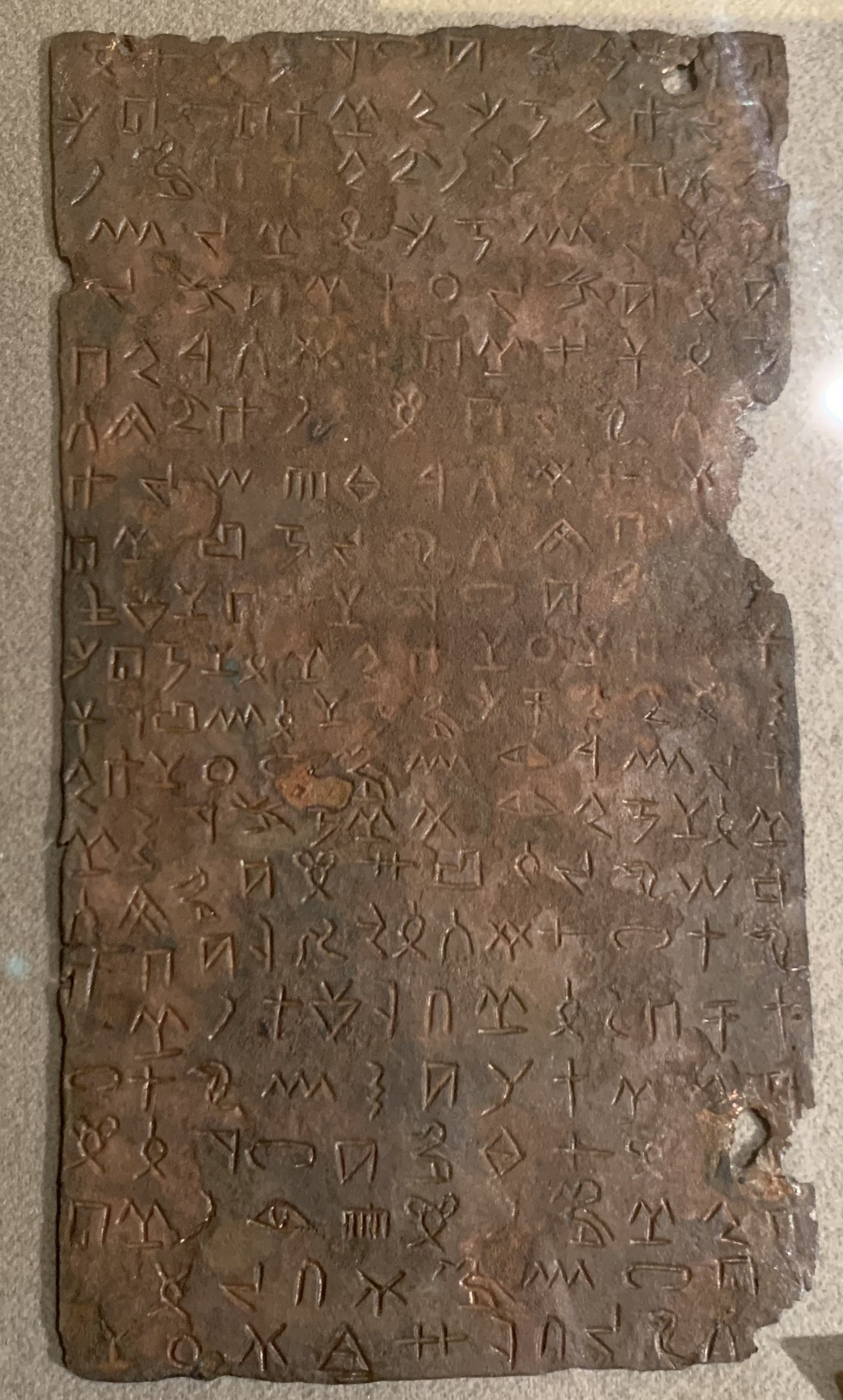
- Script type: Undeciphered (probably a syllabary or abugida)
- Period: Estimated between 1800 BC and 1400 BC
- Languages: Unknown

Related scripts
- Parent systems: Egyptian hieroglyphs/hieratic?: Byblos script

The Byblos script, also known as the Byblos syllabary, Pseudo-hieroglyphic script, Proto-Byblian, Proto-Byblic, or Byblic, is an undeciphered writing system, known from fourteen inscriptions found in Byblos, a coastal city in Lebanon. The inscriptions are engraved on bronze plates and spatulas, and carved in stone. They were excavated by Maurice Dunand, from 1928 to 1932, and published in 1945 in his monograph Byblia Grammata. The inscriptions are conventionally dated to the second millennium BC, probably between the 18th and 15th centuries BC.

Examples of the script have also been discovered in Egypt, Italy, and Megiddo (Garbini, Colless).

== Description of the script ==
=== Fourteen inscriptions ===
The Byblos script is usually written from right to left; word dividers are rarely used. Ten inscriptions were described by Dunand in 1945, named a to j in their order of discovery. They are:

- Two rectangular bronze tablets, documents c (16×11 cm) and d (21×12 cm), with 225 and 459 characters, respectively. Both tablets are inscribed on both sides. The characters were not made by scratching but by hammering chisels into the metal.
- Four bronze "spatulas" (documents b, e, f, and i, with 40, 17, 48, and 84 characters, respectively). These spatulas have a more or less triangular shape with a "flower stem" handle at the sharpest angle of the triangle. They are about 5 by 9 centimeters and 1 mm thick. It is not known what their function was, but Dunand thinks they are "labels" attached to, for example, votive objects. All spatulas are inscribed on both sides, except spatula e (one side only). The writing is relatively sloppy. The text on the back side of spatula f is the only text known that reads from left to right. Spatulae b and i use short vertical strokes as word dividers.

Inscription on spatula e

Inscription on spatula e. The handle of the spatula has broken off; four possible reconstructions of the damaged leftmost character of the inscription are given.

- Four fragments of stone steles: documents a, g, h, and j, with 116, 37, 7, and 13 characters respectively. The characters are carefully carved, with conspicuous interlinear baselines ("monumental style"). Dunand suggests that fragments h and j originally belonged to the same monument; the chemical composition of the limestone of both seems identical. The text on fragment g is written vertically, in five columns. Block j has vertical strokes, apparently as word dividers.

In 1978 Dunand published four more inscriptions on stone slabs, referred to as k to n, with approximately 28, 45, 10, and 20 signs, respectively. A four-line part of inscription l consisting of characters not elsewhere found in Proto-Byblian texts has been interpreted as an Egyptian dating formula in the hieratic script.

Photos and diagrams of all fourteen inscriptions are given by Sass.

=== Related inscriptions ===
At least four objects are known with traces of Proto-Byblian inscriptions. They have been studied by Malachi Martin. When such an object was later reused, the original text was largely erased and replaced by an inscription in Phoenician alphabetic characters. Several of these Phoenician inscriptions are dated to the 10th century BCE, which suggests that objects with Pseudo-hieroglyphs may have remained in use longer than is usually assumed.

One of these palimpsest objects is the bronze so-called Azarba‘al Spatula. On its seemingly empty back side many traces are still visible of a Proto-Byblian inscription that Dunand at first thought were random traces made by the engraver trying his stylus. Martin however identified a text of 31 signs in four lines, which he tried to interpret. He concluded that the inscription included seven cases of a consonant written twice, first in a “primitive” form (Egyptian hieroglyph, Proto-Sinaitic script), and then in the proper Proto-Byblian or Phoenician form, and he therefore called the script “mixed” or “developed” Pseudo-hieroglyphic. On the front side of the spatula an erased Proto-Byblian inscription is overwritten with a Phoenician text, but some fifteen signs of the original text are still visible.

Traces of Proto-Byblian characters are also visible on the Ahiram sarcophagus (five signs) and the Yehimilk inscription (at least 26 signs); clearly here too an older inscription was partly effaced and overwritten with a text in Phoenician alphabetic characters.

Finally, traces of ten Proto-Byblian characters are still visible between the lines of a monumental inscription in stone (the so-called “Enigmatic Byblos stone”) that has been found in Byblos. The later text is written in a script that seems intermediate between Pseudo-hieroglyphs and the later Phoenician alphabet: while most of the 21 characters are common to both the Pseudo-hieroglyphic script and the Phoenician alphabet, the few remaining signs are either Pseudo-hieroglyphic or Phoenician.

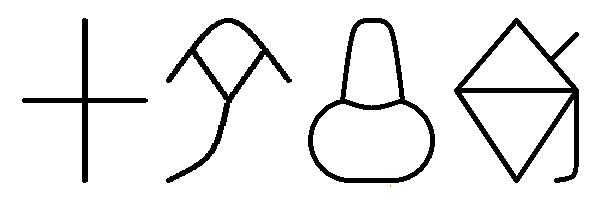
Martin has noted that a particular sequence of four Pseudo-hieroglyphs ( ) appears again and again: it is visible on the Azarba‘al Spatula, the Enigmatic stone, and no less than three times on the Yehimilk inscription, where this sequence is overwritten each time with the city name Gubal (Byblos). This reminds one of the final part of the Ahiram inscription where those who "chisel away" a funeral inscription are cursed.

Isolated characters from the Byblos syllabary have also been found on various other objects, such as axes, a dagger, and pottery.

=== Sign list ===
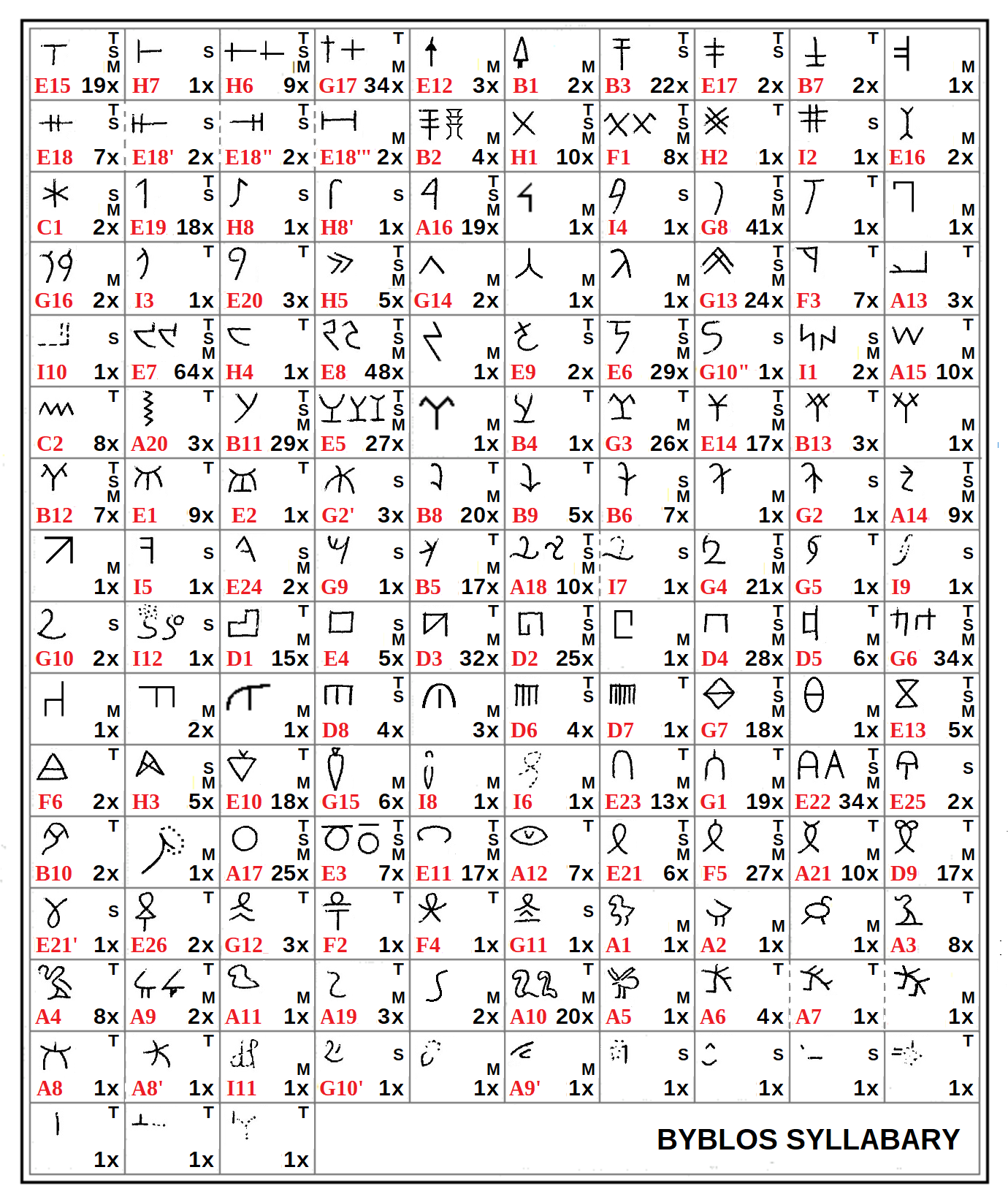
Sign list.

Each cell in the adjoining table shows a sign (upper left), its Dunand code number (lower left, in red), its frequency (lower right), and indicates (upper right) whether it was used on tablets (T), spatulas (S), or monuments (M). Signs in different cells may actually be writing variants of a single sign; for example, in the top row the signs H6, G17, and E12 are probably the same sign.

=== Number of different signs ===
The ten main Pseudo-hieroglyphic inscriptions together contain 1046 characters, while the number of 'signs', that is different characters, is given by Dunand as 114. Garbini has noted that the latter number probably is too high, for two reasons. First, Dunand's sign list includes heavily damaged characters for which it is impossible to say whether they really constitute a new sign. Secondly, writing variants clearly existed, for example between the "monumental" style of the steles and the "linear" style of the spatulas and tablets. Taking these variants into account would reduce the total number of signs.

Garbini estimates the actual number of signs to be about 90. This number suggests the script to be a syllabary, where each character was pronounced as a syllable, usually a consonant-plus-vowel combination. If the number of consonants were between 22 (like the later Phoenician alphabet) and 28 (like Ugaritic) and if the number of vowels were three (the original Semitic vowels were a, i, and u) or four to six (if it included an e and o, or a mute vowel), then the total number of signs needed would be between 3×22=66 and 6×28=168, which is of the right order of magnitude for a syllabary.

== Relation to other scripts ==
It has been observed that some signs, for example , look like modified common Egyptian hieroglyphs, but there are many others which do not. According to Hoch (1990), many of the signs seem to derive from Old Kingdom hieratic, rather than directly from hieroglyphic. It is known that from as early as 2600 BC Egyptian influence in Byblos was strong: Byblos was the main export harbor for cedar wood to Egypt, and consequently there was a considerable Egyptian merchant community in Byblos. Thus it is plausible that the syllabary was devised by someone in Byblos who had seen Egyptian hieroglyphs and used them freely as an example to compose a new syllabary that was better adapted to the native language of Byblos—just as in neighbouring Ugarit a few centuries later a cuneiform alphabet was devised that was easier to use than the complicated Akkadian cuneiform.

According to Brian Colless (2014), several signs resemble letters of the later Phoenician alphabet: , and as many as 18 of the 22 letters of the Phoenician alphabet have counterparts in the syllabary. This would entail that the latter was derived in some way from the syllabary. Colless believes that the proto-alphabet evolved as a simplification of the syllabary, moving from syllabic to consonantal writing, in the style of the Egyptian script (which did not normally indicate vowels). Thus, in his view, the inscriptions are an important link between the Egyptian hieroglyphic script and the later Semitic abjads derived from Proto-Sinaitic.

== Attempts at decipherment ==
=== Dhorme (1946) ===
The corpus of inscriptions is generally considered far too small to permit a systematic decipherment on the basis of an internal analysis of the texts. Yet already in 1946, one year after Dunand published the inscriptions, a claim for its decipherment was made, by Edouard Dhorme, a renowned Orientalist and former cryptanalyst from Paris. He noted that on the back of one of the inscribed bronze plates was a much shorter inscription ending in a row of seven nearly identical chevron-like marks, very much like our number "1111111". He assumed this to be a number (probably "seven", though Dhorme took it to be 4×10+3=43 because four marks were slightly larger than the other three), and guessed that the backside inscription as a whole contained a dating of the inscription.

The word directly before the seven "1" marks consists of four different signs: . The first (rightmost) sign, damaged but recognizable, and the leftmost sign resemble the letters 'b' and 't', respectively, of the later Phoenician alphabet. Dhorme now interpreted the whole word ('b-..-..-t') as Phoenician "b(a) + š(a)-n-t", "in the year (of)" (Hebrew bišnat), which gave him the phonetic meanings of all four signs. These he substituted in the rest of the inscriptions, thereby looking for recognizable parts of more Phoenician words that would give him the reading of more signs. In the end he proposed transcriptions for 75 signs.

=== Sobelman (1961) ===
Harvey Sobelman didn't try to find phonetic values for the various signs, but instead tried to determine word boundaries and find grammatical patterns, using his linguistic techniques. Daniels' judgement is that Sobelman's "result should be taken into account in all future work on these texts."

=== Martin (1961-1962) ===
In 1961 and 1962 Malachi Martin published two articles, after an autopsy of all inscriptions then in existence (one tablet had been partly lost when Dunand had tried to remove its thick oxide crust). The first article was devoted to vague, half-erased traces of Proto-Byblian signs on several objects, already hinted at by Dunand. The clearest signs were on the back side of the Azarba‘al Spatula. Martin there saw parallels with Egyptian hieroglyphs, Phoenician consonantal signs, and also two presumed determinatives ("to pray, speak" and "deity, Lord (of)"). He identified four Semitic words, but refrained from an all-out translation. He also described the vague signs he detected on three stone monuments (the Yeḥimilk and Aḥiram inscriptions and the Enigmatic Stone).

In his second article, in two parts, Martin first presented corrections to Dunand's readings. Subsequently, he proposed a categorization of the various signs into 27 "classes". The signs in each class he considered either "identical", or "variants of the same fundamental type". Variants he attributed to the different writing materials (stone, metal), or achievement and freedom of individual engravers. His 27 classes seem to suggest that Martin thought it possible that the syllabary might be an alphabet, but he did not draw this conclusion explicitly. After publishing this part of his analysis he never published a sequel.

=== Mendenhall (1985) ===
In 1985 a new translation attempt was published by George E. Mendenhall from the University of Michigan. Many signs that reappear in the later Phoenician alphabet were assumed by Mendenhall to have a similar phonetic value. For example, the sign which in Phoenician has the value g (Hebrew gimel), is assumed to have the phonetic value ga. A sign which resembles an Egyptian hieroglyph meaning "King of Upper Egypt" is interpreted as "mulku" (Semitic for 'regal'; compare Hebrew mèlekh, 'king'), which furnished the phonetic reading mu. The latter example illustrates that Mendenhall extensively made use of the acrophonic principle, where the phonetic value of a syllabic sign is assumed to be equal to the initial sound of the (Semitic) word for the object that is depicted by the sign.

Mendenhall took the language to be very early ("Old Coastal") Semitic, from before the split between the Northwest Semitic (Phoenician, Hebrew) and South Semitic (Old South Arabian) language groups. He dated the texts to as early as 2400 BC. As noted earlier, James Hoch (1990) sees the source of the signs in Egyptian Old Kingdom characters (c. 2700–2200 BC) and so this West Semitic syllabary would have been invented in that period.

The translations proposed by Mendenhall are often cryptic: "Adze that Yipuyu and Hagara make binding. Verily, in accordance with that which Sara and Ti.pu established we will be surety. Further: with Miku is the pledge." (Spatula document F, which includes three witness marks). The text with the seven '1' marks, referred to above (Bronze Tablet C) is interpreted by Mendenhall as a marriage contract, where the marks are the "signatures" of seven witnesses. For Mendenhall, Document D (the longest text) is a covenant document between a king and his vassals. The decipherment should not be judged on the basis of Mendenhall's translations but on the plausibility of the texts his system reveals, and also whether his table of signs and sounds produces credible results on other inscriptions that were not included in his decipherment procedure.

Brian Colless (1992, 1998) supports Mendenhall's decipherment, and argues that the Megiddo signet-ring confirms it, reading (according to Mendenhall's identifications for the signs): "Sealed, the sceptre of Megiddo". This is just one indication that use of this script was not confined to Byblos. Inscriptions employing this West Semitic syllabary have also been found in Egypt.

=== Jan Best (2008) ===
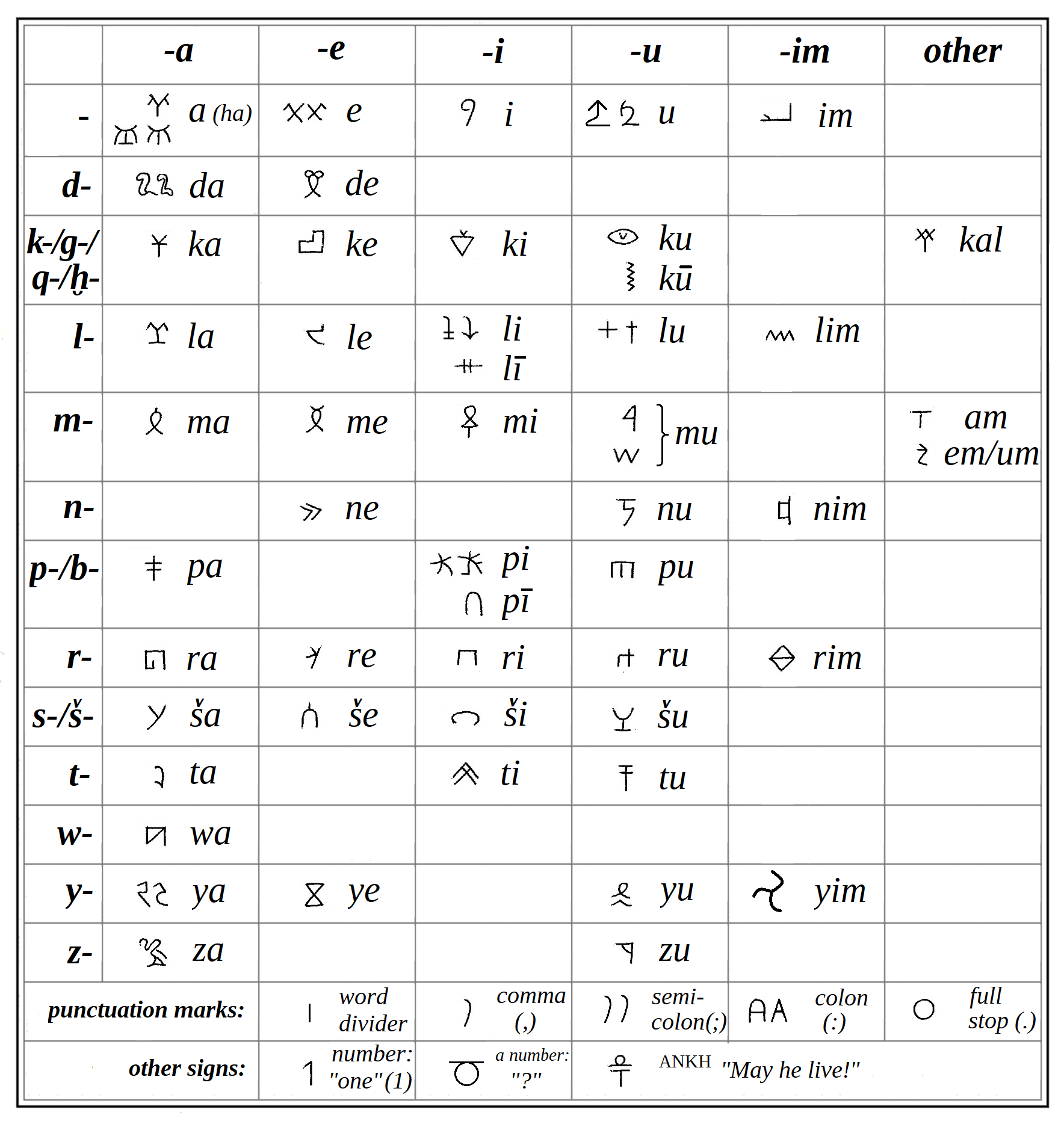
List of Byblos sign values according to Jan Best.

In 2008 Jan Best, a Dutch prehistorian and protohistorian, published an article Breaking the Code of the Byblos Script. He focused on the long tablets c and d. Best, who before had presented readings of Linear A on the assumption that its signs generally had the same sound value as in Linear B, noted that, in turn, several Byblos signs were similar to Linear A signs. He thus read the sequences wa-ya and u-ya, which appear several times. Best identified them as the Semitic word wa, 'and', just like in Linear A.

Most Byblos texts do not have word dividers. However, just before the word wa a curved sign ")" was present several times. Best interpreted it as a punctuation mark, a "comma". He also interpreted the double "))" as a "semicolon", an A-shaped sign as a "colon", and a circle "O" as a "full stop".

On tablets c and d several sequences are present multiple times, and there are also many near-repeating sequences (where only one sign differs). These could be interpreted as spelling variants, especially of proper names.

Best started by assigning to several Byblos signs a phonetical value on the basis of their similarity with signs from Linear A (or occasionally Egyptian or Cretan hieroglyphs). If a longer sequence with one unknown sign could be interpreted as an appropriate Semitic word or name, this yielded a guess for the value of that unknown sign. For example, the doublet wa-X-ya-lu / wa-X-ya-le he read as wa-ka-ya-lu/e, Akkadian waklu, 'overseers'. Thus proceeding, Best successively read some fifty signs. He found that the -u/-e ambiguity seen in wa-ka-ya-lu/e, which is also known in Linear A (where the same word is spelled sometimes ending in -u, sometimes in -e), was quite common on tablets c and d.

Best concluded that most Byblos syllables belong to four vowel sequences (like la, le, li, lu—an -o series -*lo seems to be absent). In addition there is an -im series (lim). In a few cases a different sign is used to indicate a long vowel (long lī vs. short li).

Tablet c, according to Best's interpretation, recorded gifts for the dedication of a temple built at Byblos for the Sun god Šuraya, the Indo-Arian equivalent of the Egyptian sun god Amon-Re. At the end of tablet c the conspicuous number 'seven' corresponds with the names of the seven men who oversaw the building project. The larger tablet d is similar, but more elaborate, recording the construction of a larger temple for Šuraya also at Byblos, for which there were no less than nine overseers. And stone monument a apparently records yet another building project, with three "overseers". The small spatulas are common votive presents (on spatula f the name of the Sun god Šuraya appears).

The language of the inscriptions is Northwest Semitic—Best emphasized the similarities in vocabulary, morphology, and syntax with 18th-century Akkadian. However, Byblian also had its own peculiarities, for example archaic uncontracted word forms where Akkadian has a contracted form, or a convention to sometimes write -a- as -a-ya- (like waka(y)alu > waklu, wa-ya = wa).

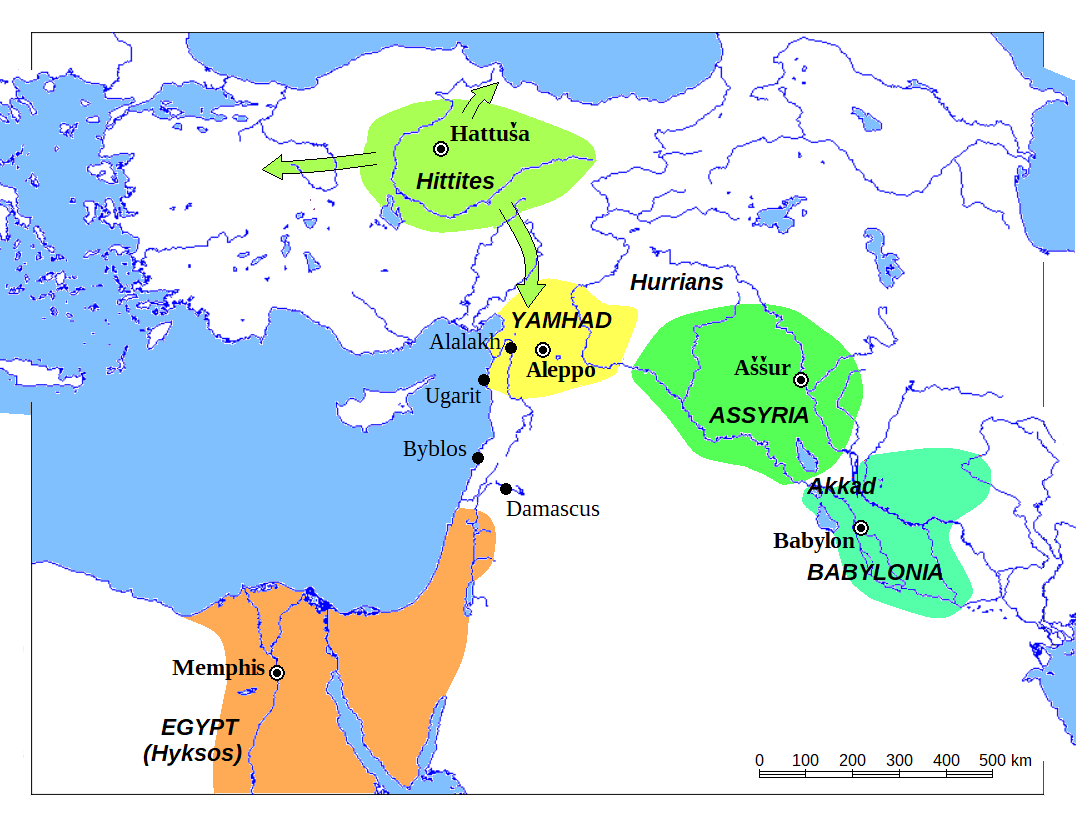
Alalakh and Aleppo threatened by the Hittites, ca. 1650 BCE.

Several names in the texts are well known from Akkadian archives, such as the names of two rulers, Yarimlim (III?), king of Aleppo, and Ammitaku (II?), a petty ruler at Alalakh; and among the seven dedicators on tablet c we encounter a name that sounds familiar: Ya-wa-ne Yu-za-le-yu-su, or 'the Greek Euzaleos'. Occasionally Hurrian loanwords (pi-ta-ki-, 'to build [a ritual building]', a Hurrian technical term) and proper names (Tišedal) are present, testimony of Hurrian influence. Best surmised that the building of the three temples for the Sun god, with rich temple gifts (gold, oil, rituals), may have been meant to propitiate the Egyptian pharaoh and to tempt him to support Yarimlim and Ammitaku against the Hittite king Hattusilis I who threatened to attack the region around 1650 BCE. Only a few years later would Hattusilis indeed capture Alalakh, Byblos was destroyed, and the Byblos script inscriptions became buried in its ruins.

Reviews of Best's 2010 book Het Byblosschrift ontcijferd (The Byblos Script deciphered) were somewhat mixed. The idea that the syllabic Linear A Script from Crete had a number of Semitic characteristics encountered some resistance among those scholars who specialised in Ancient Greek. These scholars tended to believe that Crete was linked with the origins of the Hellenistic culture.

In 2024, the linguists Elisabeth Schmutz and Michael Mäder from the Society for the Decipherment of Ancient Writing Systems (Gesellschaft für die Entzifferung antiker Schriftsysteme, GEAS) examined the assignment of phonetic values and the methods used in the Woudhuizen/Best decipherment proposal. They concluded that the process did not keep up with the GEAS guidelines, and none of the steps taken were falsifiable, meaning that the Woudhuizen/Best translations were therefore scientifically inadequate.

=== Ihor Rassokha (2017) ===
Ihor Rassokha, professor of the Department of History and Cultural Studies of the Kharkiv National Academy of Municipal Economy wrote the article "Indo-European origin of alphabetic systems and deciphering of the Byblos script." He interpreted the Byblos alphabetic (abugida) script to be based on the Brahmi letters. As the result a conclusion has been made that the Byblos texts should be read in Sanskrit. It is generally accepted that in the Ancient East a spread of battle chariots happened together with the penetration of Indo-Aryans which led to the Indo-Aryan dynasties’ ruling and the Indo-Aryan domination in the Hittite state and the Mitanni.

=== Hugo Cartwright (2026) ===
Although not described by the author as any kind of full decipherment, a preliminary reading is currently being attempted by Hugo Cartwright for tablets c. and d. The term "Ba'alat" is visible as "bʕnt" or "bolt" and "Byblos" is tentatively presented in the Egyptian form "kpn". The exploratory contribution reopens the question of whether the Byblos script was majoritarily used to write Afro-Asiatic languages.

== See also ==
- Proto-Sinaitic
- Phoenician

== Literature ==
- Best, Jan Het Byblosschrift ontcijferd - In het voetspoor van Willem Glasbergen 2010 (ISBN 9789035136007)
- Best, Jan (2017). How to Decipher the Byblos Script. Wien: Lit. ISBN 978-3-643-90963-3.
- Best, Jan, 'Suruya in the Byblos Script Corpus', Ugarit-Forschungen 40 (2009), 135-41 (reprinted in Best (2017) pp. 65–72)
- Best, Jan, 'Breaking the Code of the Byblos Script', Ugarit-Forschungen 40 (2009), 129-133 (reprinted in Best (2017) pp. 59–64)
- Colless, Brian, "The Byblos Syllabary and the Proto-alphabet", Abr-Nahrain/Ancient Near Eastern Studies 30 (1992), 15–62
- Colless, Brian, "The Canaanite Syllabary", Ancient Near Eastern Studies 35 (1998), 26–46.
- Colless, Brian E., "The Origin of the Alphabet: An Examination of the Goldwasser Hypothesis", Antiguo Oriente 12 (2014) 71–104.
- Daniels, P.T., "Pseudo-hieroglyphs of Byblos", in: P.T. Daniels & W. Bright (eds.), The World's Writing Systems (New York/Oxford, 1996), 29–30.
- Dhorme, Édouard, 'Déchiffrement des inscriptions pseudohiéroglyphiques de Byblos', in: Syria 25 (1946–1948).
- Dunand, Maurice, 'Spatule de bronze avec épigraphe phénicienne du XIII^{e} [actually: X^{e}] siècle', in: Bulletin du Musée de Beyrouth 2 (1938) 99–107. (Spatula with traces of Proto-Byblian writing)
- Dunand, Maurice (1945). Byblia Grammata: Documents et recherches sur le développement de l'écriture en Phénicie. Beirut: République Libanaise, Ministère de l’Éducation National des Beaux-Arts.
- Garbini, Giovanni, [review of Mendenhall's book], in: Rivista di Studi Fenici 16 (1988), 129–131.
- Hoch, James E. (1990). "The Byblos Syllabary: Bridging the Gap Between Egyptian Hieroglyphs and Semitic Alphabets". Journal of the Society for the Study of Egyptian Antiquities. 20: 115–124.
- Martin, Malachi, The Scribal Character of the Dead Sea Scrolls, Vol. 1, Bibliothèque du Muséon 44, Publications Universitaires, Louvain, 1958
- Martin, Malachi, The Scribal Character of the Dead Sea Scrolls, Vol. 2, Bibliothèque du Muséon 45, Publications Universitaires, Louvain, 1958
- Martin, Malachi (1961). "A Preliminary Report after Re-Examination of the Byblian Inscriptions". Orientalia (Nova Series). 30 (1): 46–78. JSTOR 43073578.
- Martin, Malachi (1962). "Revision and Reclassification of the Proto-Byblian Signs". Orientalia (Nova Series). 31 (2): 250–271. JSTOR 43073693.
- Martin, Malachi (1962). "Revision and Reclassification of the Proto-Byblian Signs (Continued)". Orientalia (Nova Series). 31 (3): 339–363. JSTOR 43073707.
- Mäder, Michael & Schmutz, Elisabeth (2024): „Die Byblos-Schrift: Beurteilung des Entzifferungsvorschlags von F. Woudhuizen und J. Best anhand der GEAS-Methodologie. “. Begleitpapiere zum Entzifferungstool – Alice Kober Gesellschaft für die Entzifferung antiker Schriftsysteme (GEAS) 2024/1. [= Assessing Decipherment Attempts Series 1].
- Mendenhall, George E., The Syllabic Inscriptions from Byblos, Beirut, The American University (1985), Syracuse University Press (1986), ISBN 0-8156-6077-4.
- Sobelman, Harvey, 'The Proto-Byblian inscriptions: a fresh approach', in: Journal of Semitic Studies 6 (1961) 226–245.
- Thiollet, Jean-Pierre, Je m'appelle Byblos, H & D (2005), ISBN 2-914266-04-9.
