= Paul Faure (archaeologist) =

French archaeologist (1916–2007)

Paul Faure (French: [pɔl fɔʁ]; 1 January 1916 in Paris – 13 July 2007) was a distinguished French archaeologist and philologist. He worked extensively on the history and linguistics of the Mediterranean, and especially of Crete and of the Minoan civilization.

== Education ==
He studied at the Lycée Montaigne, and at the Lycée Louis-le-Grand in Paris. Later, he graduated from École normale supérieure.

He started to teach at various French Lycees in 1943. He taught at French Universities starting from 1955. His doctoral thesis was under the guidance of Dr. Charles Picard.

In 1967, he became professor of Greek language and civilization at the University Blaise Pascal at Clermont-Ferrand. He eventually became Doctor Honoris Causa at the University of Athens.

== Work ==
During his life as a scientist, Faure was connected with expeditions and studies of history, historical geography, and linguistics of the Mediterranean and Near East. He has worked and published extensively on topics related to Minoan civilization, particularly on the interpretation of the Linear A writing system.

He started to work in Crete in 1953, and prepared an extensive catalogue of ancient sites. He also explored many Cretan caves, and worked on the historical geography of Crete.

Faure has advanced the hypothesis that the language written in Linear A was a pre-Greek Indo-European language. He has also proposed a deciphering of the Phaistos disc.

With a group of friends, Faure worked on recreations of many of Alexander the Great's military campaigns in the Near and Middle East.

His bibliography comprises more than 70 articles and books, published between 1961 and 2003.

Faure was made an honorary citizen of Iraklion, Crete.

== Awards ==
- Chevalier de la Légion d'honneur
- Officier de l'Ordre national du Mérite
- Commandeur des Palmes académiques

== Major published works ==
- 1964 - Faure, Paul. Fonctions des Cavernes Crétoises. École française d'Athènes, Travaux et mémoires 14.E. de Boccard, Paris.
- 1973 - Faure, Paul. La vie quotidienne en Crète au temps de Minos (1500 av.J.-C.). Hachette, Paris.
- 1975 - Faure, Paul. La vie quotidienne en Grèce au temps de la Guerre de Troie (1250 avant Jésus-Christ). Hachette, Paris.
- 1976 - Faure, Paul (translated by Isolde and K. F. Eisen). Kreta. Das Leben im Reich des Minos. Reclam, Stuttgart.
- 1982 - Faure, Paul. Henri Schliemann: Une vie d'archéologue. Jean Cyrille Godefroy, Paris.
- 1989 - Faure, Paul. Recherches de toponymie crétoise. Opera Selecta. Adolf M. Hakkert, Amsterdam.
- 1990 - Faure, Paul (translated by Barbara Brumm). Magie der Düfte. Eine Kulturgeschichte der Wohlgerüche. Von den Pharaonen zu den Römern. Artemis Verlag, München and Zürich.
- 1992 - Faure, Paul (editor and translator). Henri Schliemann: Une vie d'archéologue. Jean-Cyrille Godefroy, Paris, France.
- 1996 - Faure, Paul. Iera spilea tis Kritis (Sifis Kamaris, translator). Iraklion: Vikelea Vivliothiki.
