= Minos Kalokairinos =

Greek art historian and archaeologist (1843–1907)

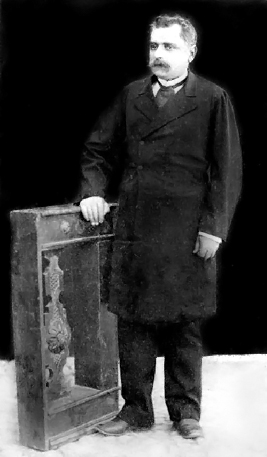
- Born: 1843; Heraklion, Crete, Ottoman Empire
- Died: 1907 (aged 63–64); Heraklion, Crete, Greece
- Scientific career
- Fields: Archaeology

Minos Kalokairinos (Greek: Μίνως Καλοκαιρινός, 1843, Heraklion - 1907, Heraklion) was a Cretan Greek businessman and amateur archaeologist known for performing the first excavations at the Minoan palace of Knossos. His excavations were continued later by Arthur Evans.

== Biography ==
He was the youngest of the sons of Andreas Kalokairinos, a rich landowner, who owned, in particular, the site of the Cnossian palace. He obtained secondary education on the island of Syros, then enrolled with the law faculty of the university of Athens where he studied only for a year, as his father's illness forced him to return to Heraklion. After his father died, he and his brother Lysimachos Kalokairinos assumed management of his soap manufacturing business.

In 1869 he married Skevo Kyriazi, with whom he had five children. In 1895 his company became bankrupt.

In 1903 he resumed his legal studies.

== Excavations ==
The initial excavation began in 1877 on the Kephala Hill, followed by full-scale excavations in 1878 which revealed the first good evidence that Knossos (or Cnossos), the most important site of the Minoan civilization, was there, attracting worldwide interest.

The Turkish authorities who controlled the island forced him to stop excavation three weeks later, but he managed to discover storage rooms and a corner part of the throne hall of the west wing of the palace.

News of his excavations awoke interest among many archaeologists, including W.J. Stillman, Heinrich Schlieman and finally Sir Arthur John Evans, who was able to excavate the whole palace after the island gained independence from Turkey.

== Collection ==
Minos Kalokairinos had a large collection of objects found during his excavations. During the violent events of August 25, 1898, when the Turks attacked the locals attempting to suppress the Cretan revolt, his home was pillaged and burnt, and his collection was much damaged; only the rarest objects, which were kept separately, survived. They were mostly amphoras found in the western wing of the palace, which he donated later to museums of Greece, Paris and London to promote public interest in Cnossos.
