= Knossos =

Archaeological site and Minoan palace complex in Heraklion, Crete

- Κνωσός (Greek)
- Κνωσσός, Cnossus, Knosos
- 35°17′53″N 25°9′47″E
- Type: Minoan palace, urban settlement
- Periods: Neolithic, Bronze Age, Iron Age, Classical, Hellenistic, Roman, Byzantine
- Cultures: Minoan, Mycenaean, Greek, Roman, Byzantine
- Location: Heraklion, Crete, Greece
- Region: Southern periphery of Heraklion, about 5 km (3.1 mi) south of the historic centre

History
- Built: Settlement from about 7000 BC; first palace about 1900 BC
- Abandoned: Palatial destruction conventionally dated about 1350 BC; wider site occupied into the Byzantine period

Site notes
- Area: Knossos Urban Landscape Project survey area: about 11 km^{2} (4.2 sq mi). Palace: about 20,000 m^{2} (220,000 sq ft).
- Excavation dates: 1878 to present
- Archaeologists: Minos Kalokairinos, Arthur Evans, David George Hogarth, Duncan Mackenzie, Theodore Fyfe, Christian Doll, Piet de Jong, John Davies Evans
- Condition: Restored and maintained for visitation
- Management: Ephorate of Antiquities of Heraklion
- Public access: Yes
- Website: Municipality of Heraklion; Hellenic Ministry of Culture

UNESCO World Heritage Site
- Part of: Minoan Palatial Centres
- Criteria: Cultural: ii, iii, iv, vi
- Reference: 1733-001
- Inscription: 2025 (47th Session)

Knossos (/(kə)ˈnɒsoʊs, -səs/; Ancient Greek: Κνωσσός, romanized: Knōssós; Greek: Κνωσός, romanized: Knōsós; Linear B: 𐀒𐀜𐀰 Ko-no-so) is an archaeological site and ancient urban centre in Crete, Greece. It is located within the southern periphery of Heraklion, about 5 km (3.1 mi) south of the city's historic centre. The site was occupied from the Neolithic period into the first millennium AD and became the largest and best-known centre of the Minoan civilisation.

Knossos is widely considered Europe's oldest city.

Settlement on Kephala hill began around 7000 BC, making Knossos one of the earliest known Neolithic settlements on Crete. Its expansion into an urban centre accelerated at the beginning of the second millennium BC. Knossos became a leading centre of the Minoan civilisation, widely regarded as Europe's earliest advanced civilisation. Occupation of the valley continued through the Greek, Roman and early Byzantine periods.

The site is dominated by the monumental Palace of Minos. Like other Minoan palaces, the complex is generally interpreted as an administrative, economic, religious and ceremonial centre. Its role as a royal residence is debated. The first palace was built around 1900 BC on a hill that had already been occupied for several millennia. It was rebuilt and expanded after a major destruction around 1700 BC and remained the central monument of Knossos into the Late Bronze Age. A major palatial destruction is conventionally dated to about 1350 BC, although the chronology of the palace's final destruction remains debated.

Knossos is closely associated with the Greek myths of Minos, Pasiphaë, Ariadne, Theseus, Daedalus, Icarus and the Minotaur. In later Greek tradition, the complex plan of the palace was remembered as the Labyrinth. In 2025, Knossos was inscribed as part of the UNESCO World Heritage Site Minoan Palatial Centres, together with Phaistos, Malia, Zakros, Zominthos and Kydonia.

== Name ==
The ancient name of the city is attested in Greek as Κνωσσός and in Linear B as 𐀒𐀜𐀰, transliterated as Ko-no-so. The Latinised form Cnossus was also used in antiquity and in older scholarship. The modern Greek form is usually written Κνωσός, although the classical spelling Κνωσσός remains common in archaeological and historical writing.

== Location and setting ==
Knossos lies on Kephala hill, in the valley of the Kairatos river, within the modern municipality of Heraklion, about 5 km (3.1 mi) south of the historic centre. The location gave the ancient settlement access to the north coast of Crete, its harbour and routes into the island's interior.

The archaeological landscape extends beyond the palace itself. It includes remains of the surrounding Minoan town, later Greek and Roman occupation, cemeteries, roads, villas, sanctuaries and ritual buildings. The Knossos Urban Landscape Project, a collaboration involving the British School at Athens and the Greek Archaeological Service, surveyed approximately 11 km^{2} (4.2 sq mi) around Knossos. It documented occupation from about 7000 BC into the modern period across an archaeological landscape that includes an urban site of about 1.5 km^{2} (0.58 sq mi), surrounding cemeteries and other archaeological features.

== Chronology ==
The chronology of Knossos extends from the Neolithic to the Byzantine period. The dates below are approximate; the dating of the final palatial destruction remains debated.

Main periods at Knossos
Period	Approximate date	Main characteristics
Neolithic	c. 7000 to 3000 BC	First permanent settlement on Kephala hill; early farming community; long continuity of occupation
Prepalatial period	c. 3000 to 1900 BC	Settlement growth, increasing craft specialisation, exchange networks and social complexity
First Palace period	c. 1900 to 1700 BC	Construction of the first palace; development of palatial administration, storage and ritual activity
Second Palace period	c. 1700 to 1450 BC	Rebuilt and expanded palace; peak of Minoan architecture, fresco painting and palace-centred organisation
Mycenaean period	c. 1450 to 1350 BC	Mycenaean Greek influence; Linear B administration; major palatial destruction conventionally dated about 1350 BC
Postpalatial and Late Bronze Age	c. 1350 to 1100 BC	Reduced use of the palace complex; continued occupation of the wider settlement
Early Iron Age	c. 1100 to 700 BC	Continued settlement; important cemeteries; evidence of regional status and external contacts
Archaic and Classical periods	c. 700 to 323 BC	Development as a Greek Cretan city-state; association with Minos and Cretan lawgiving traditions
Hellenistic period	c. 323 to 67 BC	Political rivalry with other Cretan cities, especially Gortyn; continued urban occupation
Roman period	67 BC to late antiquity	Roman colony; development of villas, mosaics and later urban structures
Early Byzantine period	Late antiquity to first millennium AD	Continued but declining occupation as Heraklion became the dominant regional centre

== History ==
=== Neolithic period ===
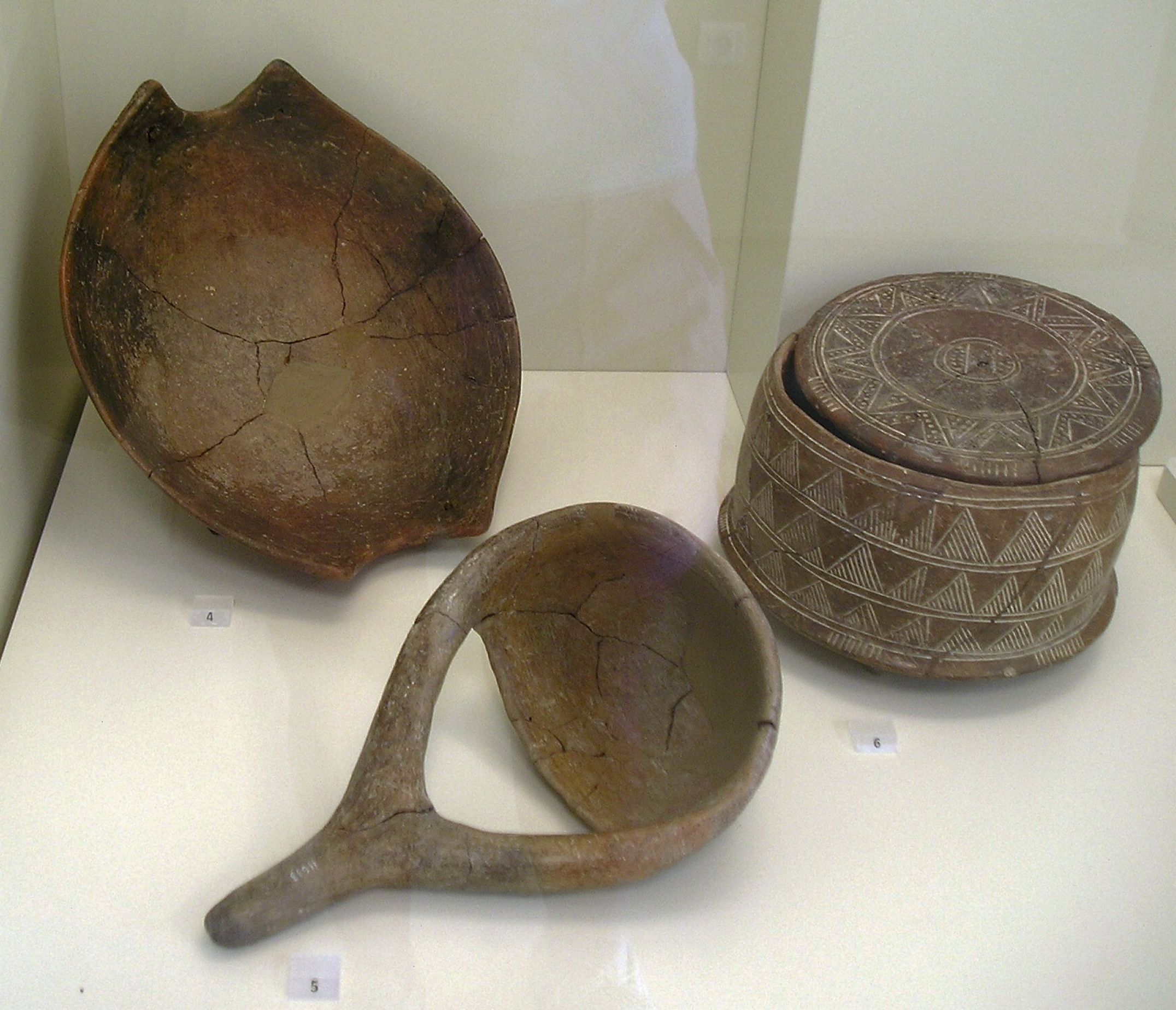
Bowl with fork handles from Knossos, Early Neolithic, 6500 to 5800 BC. Also a ladle and a three-legged vessel from later periods

The earliest known settlement at Knossos dates to about 7000 BC, during the early Neolithic period. This makes Knossos one of the earliest permanent settlements on Crete and one of the earliest long-lived settlements in the Aegean. The first community occupied the summit of Kephala hill, the later site of the palace. Archaeological evidence indicates a small but stable settlement based on farming, animal husbandry and domestic craft production.

Over the following millennia, the settlement expanded and accumulated deep archaeological deposits. Pottery, stone tools, figurines and building remains show long continuity through the Early, Middle, Late and Final Neolithic phases. By the Final Neolithic, the settlement formed a sizeable community that continued to grow during the third millennium BC.

=== Prepalatial period ===
During the Prepalatial period, about 3000 to 1900 BC, Knossos grew in size and complexity before the construction of the first palace. The settlement developed stronger craft specialisation, wider exchange networks and greater social differentiation. Survey evidence indicates a marked acceleration of settlement growth at the beginning of the second millennium BC.

The end of the Prepalatial period saw major architectural changes on Kephala hill. Earlier structures were levelled or reorganised, creating the platform on which the first palace was built.

=== First Palace period ===
The first palace at Knossos was constructed around 1900 BC. It marked a major shift in the organisation of the settlement and the surrounding region. The palace appears to have functioned as a centre for administration, storage, redistribution, ritual activity and craft production. The use of writing systems, sealings and specialised storage areas points to a complex bureaucracy.

The first palace was destroyed around 1700 BC, probably by an earthquake or a series of seismic events. The palace was subsequently rebuilt on a larger and more elaborate scale.

=== Second Palace period ===
The Second Palace period, from about 1700 to 1450 BC, was the height of Minoan Knossos. The palace was reconstructed with its central court, monumental entrances, staircases, magazines, reception rooms, ritual spaces, light wells, drainage systems and richly decorated wall paintings. The surrounding town also expanded.

During this period, Knossos maintained strong links with other parts of Crete and the wider eastern Mediterranean. Evidence from pottery, frescoes, administrative documents and luxury objects suggests extensive economic, artistic and cultural exchange.

The palace was partially destroyed around 1450 BC, during a wider period of disruption affecting many Minoan sites. After this event, Knossos continued to function, but with stronger Mycenaean Greek influence.

=== Mycenaean and Postpalatial period ===
After about 1450 BC, Knossos became an important Mycenaean administrative centre. The Linear B tablets discovered at the site record an early form of Greek and provide evidence for administrative control over land, labour, livestock, textiles, offerings and other resources. These tablets are a major source for the study of Late Bronze Age Crete and Mycenaean administration.

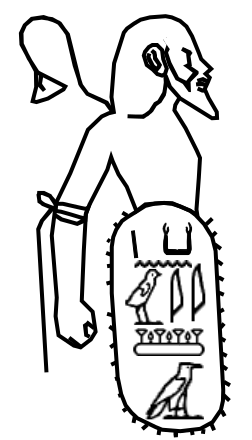
The name of Knossos written in Egyptian hieroglyphs on the Aegean place-name list of Amenhotep III

The fourteenth-century BC Aegean place-name list of Amenhotep III at his mortuary temple at Kom el-Hetan includes a name generally identified as Knossos. The list has been interpreted as an itinerary of an Egyptian journey to the Aegean, although its purpose remains debated.

A major destruction of the palace by fire is conventionally dated to about 1350 BC. The date of the final destruction and the interpretation of later material in the palace remain subjects of archaeological research. Occupation of the wider settlement continued after the decline of the palatial administration.

=== Early Iron Age ===
Knossos remained occupied after the collapse of the Bronze Age palace system. During the Early Iron Age, it was one of the most significant communities on Crete. Cemeteries such as the North Cemetery, Fortetsa and Teke provide evidence for continued prosperity, social organisation and overseas contacts. Grave goods show connections with other parts of the Aegean and the eastern Mediterranean.

Survey work has also identified extensive Early Iron Age occupation beyond the areas previously excavated. Imported pottery, metals and ornaments indicate connections with mainland Greece, Cyprus, the Near East, Egypt, Italy and the western Mediterranean. Burial evidence and settlement material together help establish the extent and character of the community.

=== Archaic, Classical and Hellenistic periods ===
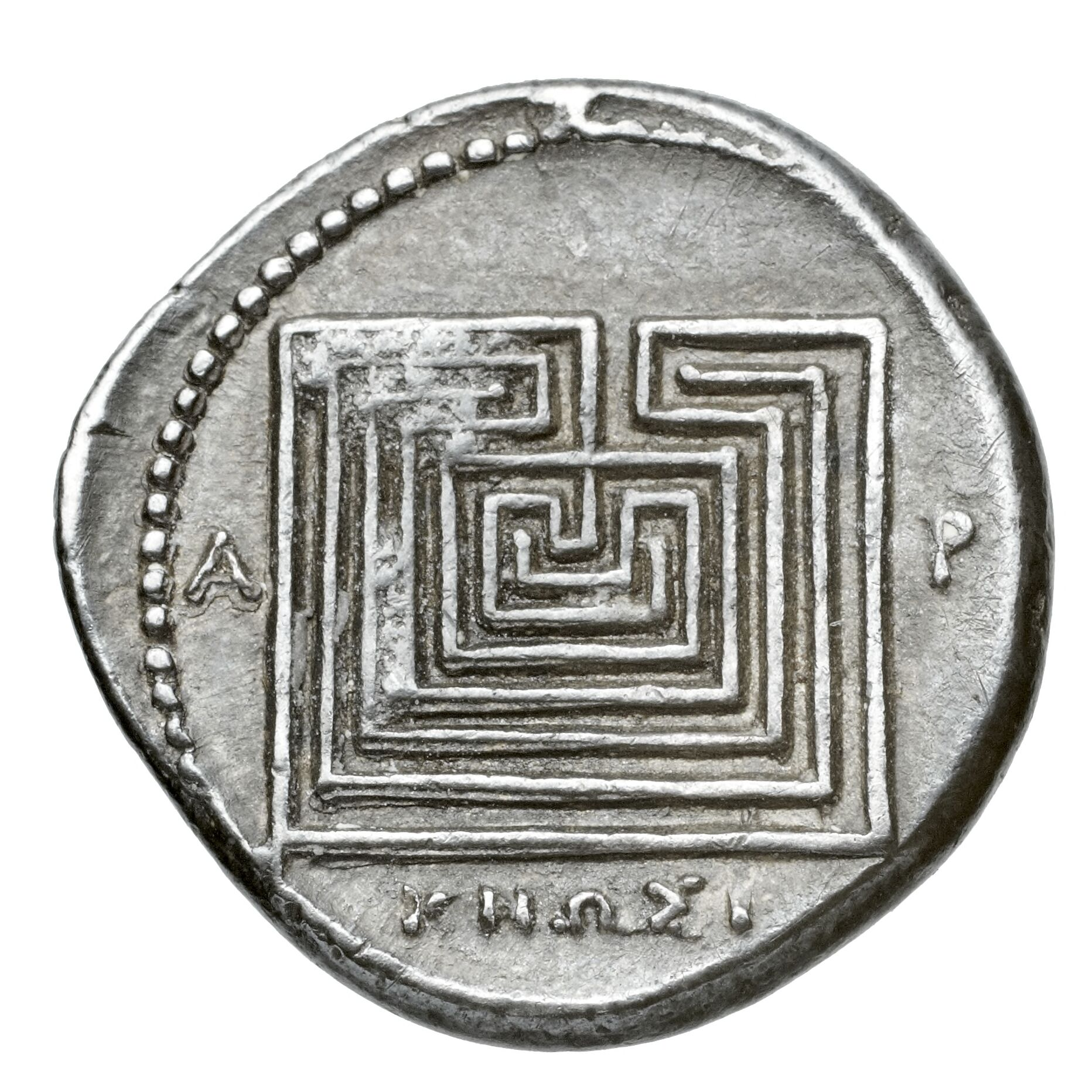
Silver drachm of Knossos showing the Labyrinth motif

In the Archaic and Classical periods, Knossos was a major Cretan city-state. It was associated in Greek tradition with King Minos and the laws of Crete. Literary sources and archaeological evidence show that Knossos remained politically important, although its power fluctuated in relation to other Cretan cities, especially Gortyn.

Knossos issued coinage and participated in the political and military rivalries of Crete. Its mythological status also gave it cultural significance beyond the island. The Labyrinth motif on Knossian coinage demonstrates the continuing connection between the city and the mythic memory of Minos, Theseus and the Minotaur.

During the Hellenistic period, Knossos continued to compete with other Cretan cities. Cretan politics in this period were marked by alliances, rivalries and repeated local conflicts. Knossos remained one of the principal cities of the island, although Gortyn increasingly became the dominant political centre in Roman Crete.

=== Roman and early Byzantine periods ===
In the Roman period, after Crete came under Roman control, Knossos remained inhabited and developed new public and private buildings. The Roman Villa of Dionysos, known for its mosaics, is one of the notable remains from this phase. The city became known as Colonia Iulia Nobilis Cnossus, reflecting its status under Roman rule.

Occupation continued into the early Byzantine period, although the site gradually declined in importance as nearby Heraklion became the dominant urban centre of the region. The ancient name survived in later settlement history and in the modern place name.

== Mythology ==
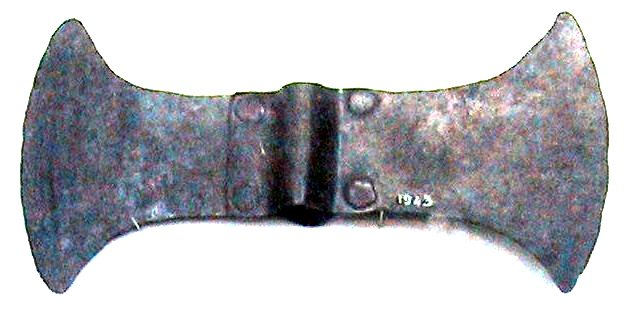
A bronze labrys from the Messara Plain. The double axe became one of the most recognisable symbols associated with Minoan Crete.

Knossos was central to several of the best-known myths of ancient Crete. In Greek tradition, it was the seat of King Minos, son of Zeus and Europa. Minos was remembered as a powerful ruler, lawgiver and judge.

The most famous myth connected with Knossos is the story of the Labyrinth and the Minotaur. According to the myth, Minos ordered Daedalus to build the Labyrinth to contain the Minotaur, a creature with the body of a man and the head of a bull. Athens was forced to send young men and women as tribute until Theseus, helped by Minos's daughter Ariadne, entered the Labyrinth, killed the Minotaur and escaped by following a thread.

Other myths connected with Knossos include the story of Daedalus and Icarus, who escaped from Crete with wings made by Daedalus. These myths became central to later Greek, Roman and European art, literature and political symbolism.

The association between Knossos and the Labyrinth has been interpreted in several ways. Some scholars have connected the word "labyrinth" with the labrys, or double axe, although this interpretation remains debated. The palace's complex plan, with its courts, corridors, staircases and multiple levels, probably contributed to the later Greek image of Knossos as the home of the Labyrinth.

== Archaeology ==
=== Early investigation ===
The first known modern excavation at Knossos was carried out in 1878 and 1879 for several weeks by Minos Kalokairinos, a Cretan antiquarian and merchant from Heraklion. Kalokairinos exposed parts of the west wing and identified storage magazines containing large pithoi. His work demonstrated the importance of the site and attracted wider scholarly interest. Political conditions in Ottoman Crete prevented large-scale excavation at that time. After Crete gained autonomy, the site became available for systematic archaeological work.

=== Arthur Evans ===
In 1900, Arthur Evans began large-scale excavations at Knossos. Working with archaeologists and architects including Duncan Mackenzie, David George Hogarth, Theodore Fyfe and Christian Doll, Evans uncovered most of the palace and many parts of the surrounding settlement.

Evans established "Minoan" as the archaeological designation for the Bronze Age civilisation of Crete, drawing on the myth of King Minos. His work made Knossos central to the study of Aegean prehistory. Finds from the excavations included fresco fragments, pottery, sealings, figurines, stone vessels, metal objects and thousands of Linear B tablets.

Evans undertook extensive reconstructions at the palace using reinforced concrete, colour and architectural interpretation. These works made the site visually accessible to visitors but have also been criticised because they sometimes go beyond what can be securely reconstructed from the archaeological evidence. They are now part of the modern history of Knossos as well as part of the visitor experience.

=== Later research ===
Research at Knossos continued after Evans through excavation, conservation, museum study, survey and reanalysis of earlier material. The British School at Athens, the Greek Archaeological Service and other institutions have worked on the palace, the town, the cemeteries and the wider archaeological landscape.

The Knossos Urban Landscape Project expanded the study of the site beyond the palace by surveying the valley and documenting long-term settlement patterns. This work has helped shift interpretation from a palace-centred model to a broader understanding of Knossos as a long-lived urban landscape.

== Palace complex ==
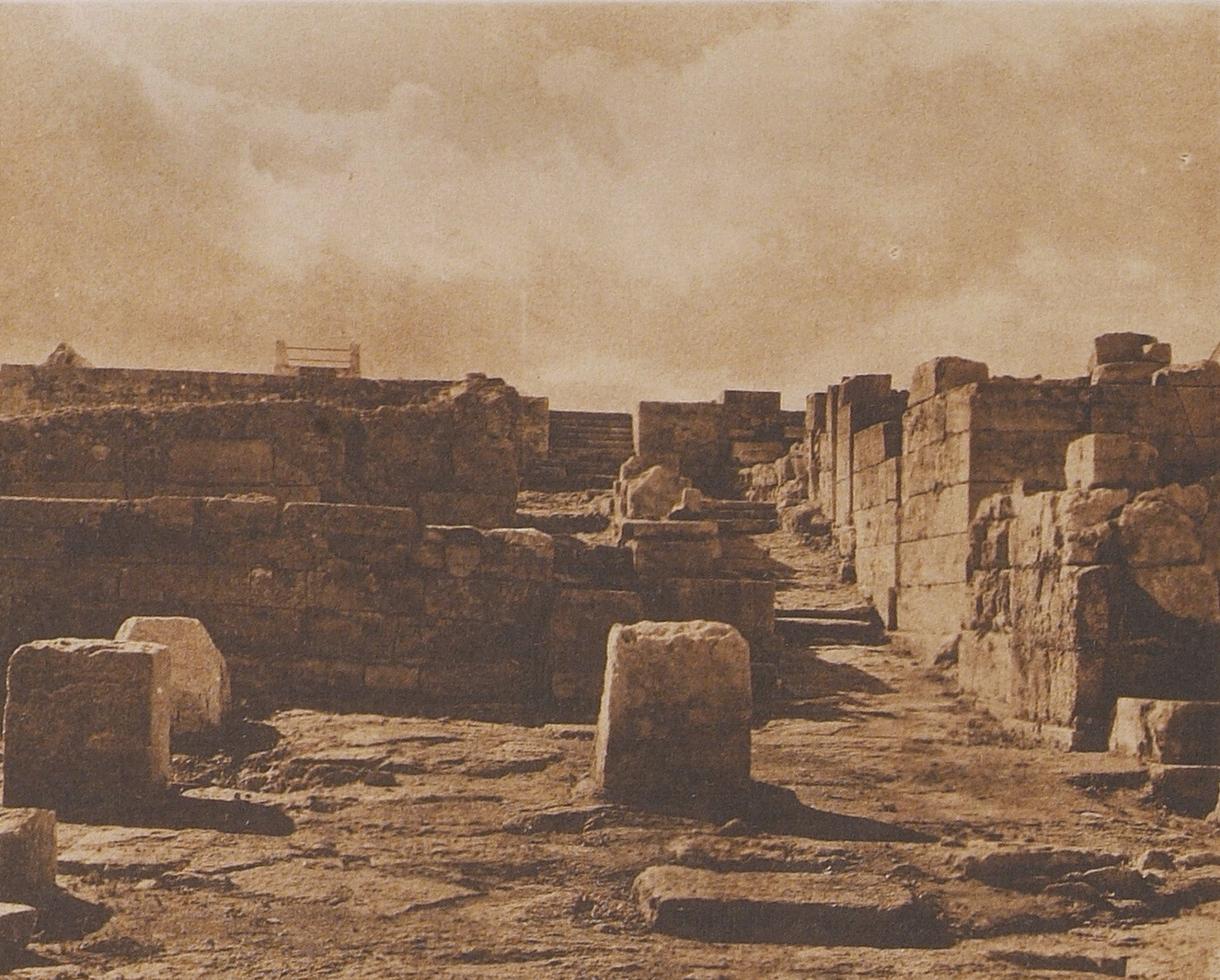
Restored North Entrance of the palace

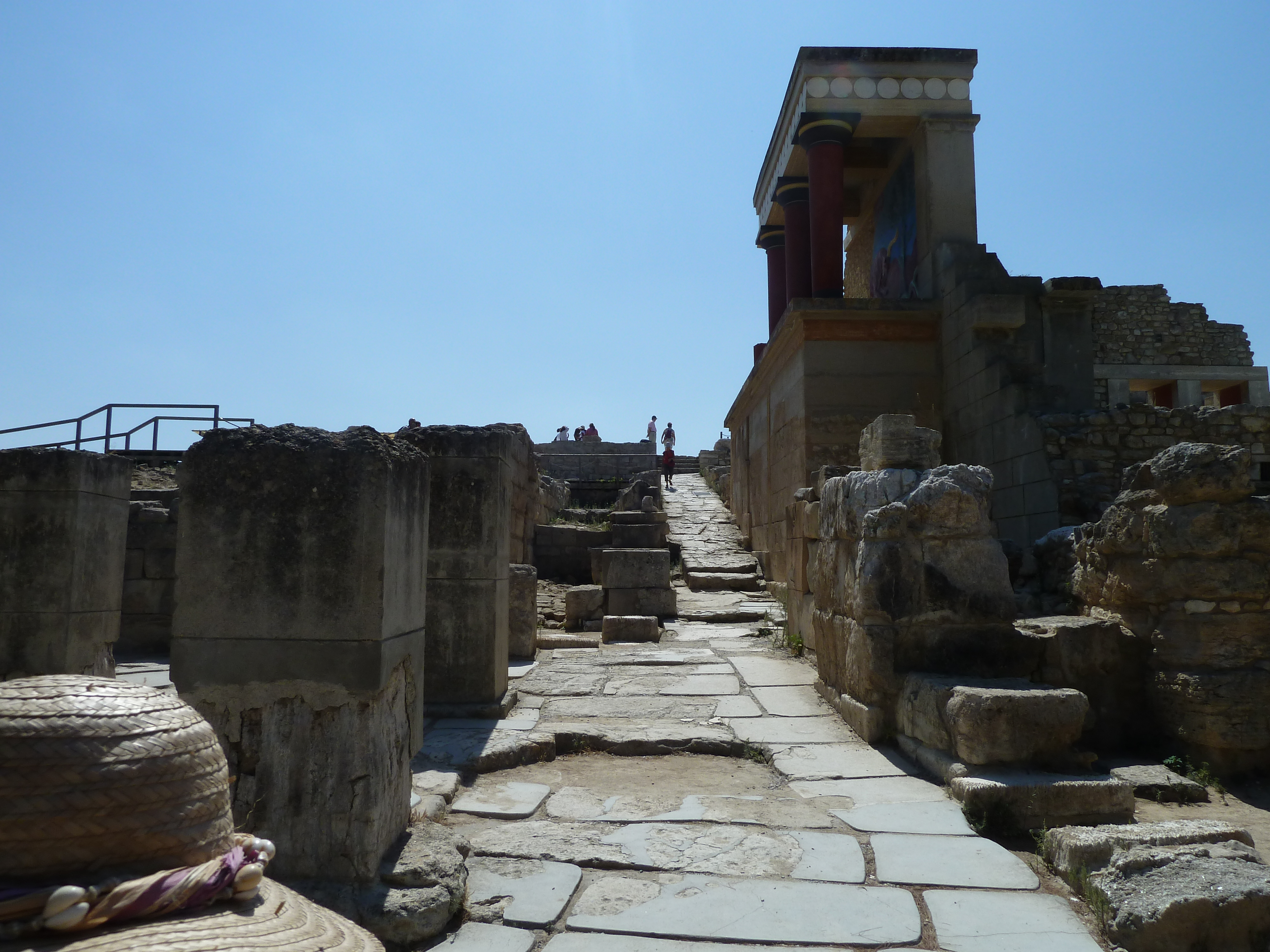
Restored architectural detail at Knossos

The Palace of Minos is the dominant archaeological feature at Knossos. The multi-storey complex covered approximately 20,000 m^{2} (220,000 sq ft).

The palace was continuously renovated and modified throughout its use. Its visible form largely belongs to the Second Palace period, although earlier and later phases are preserved within and around the complex. The palace formed part of the surrounding town.

=== Layout ===
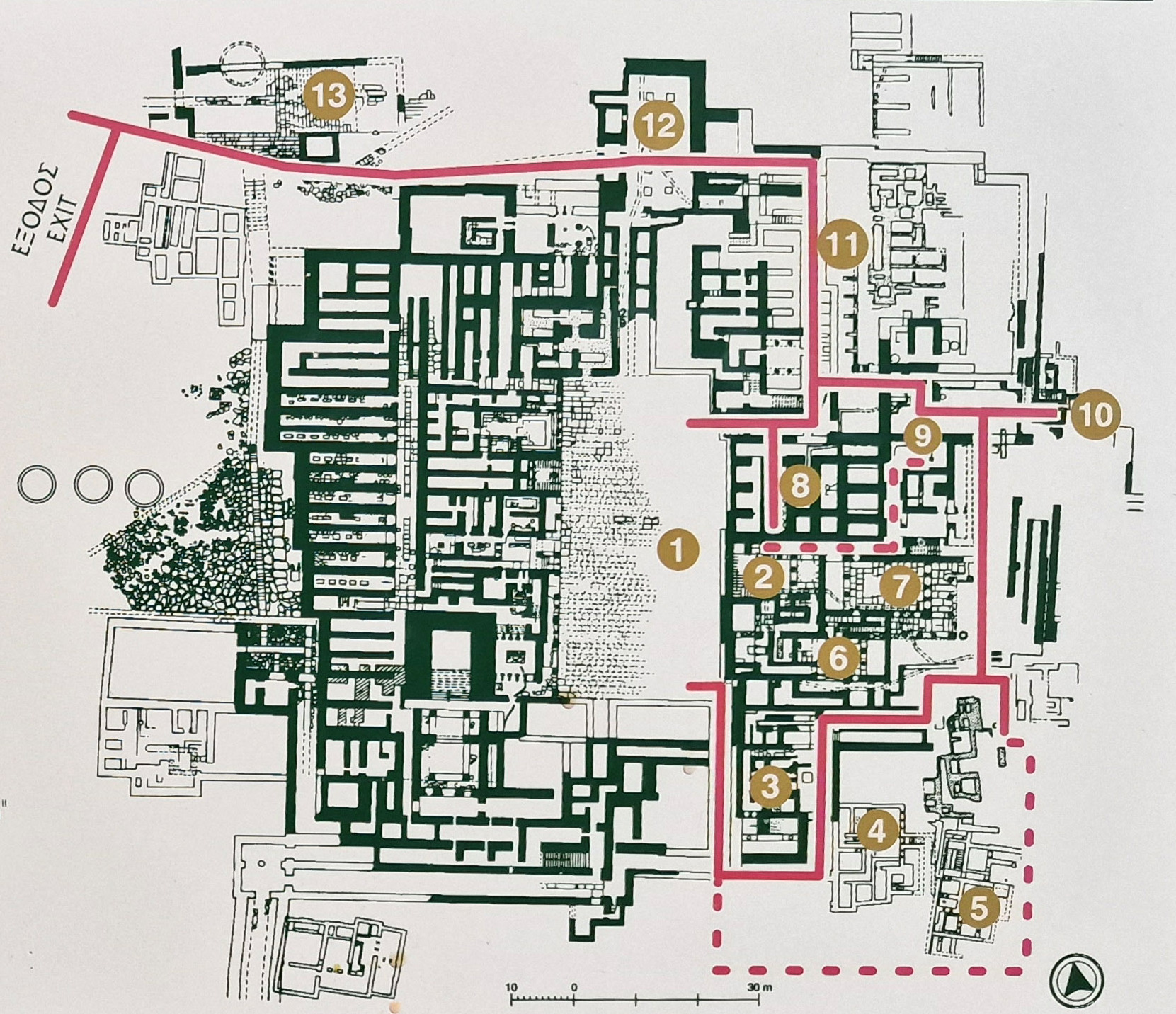
Plan of the palace at Knossos, organised around the Central Court

Like other Minoan palaces, Knossos was arranged around a large rectangular Central Court. This court was the organising space of the complex and was probably used for ceremonies, gatherings and movement through the palace. The building developed over several levels and included staircases, corridors, light wells, magazines, workshops, shrines and reception rooms.

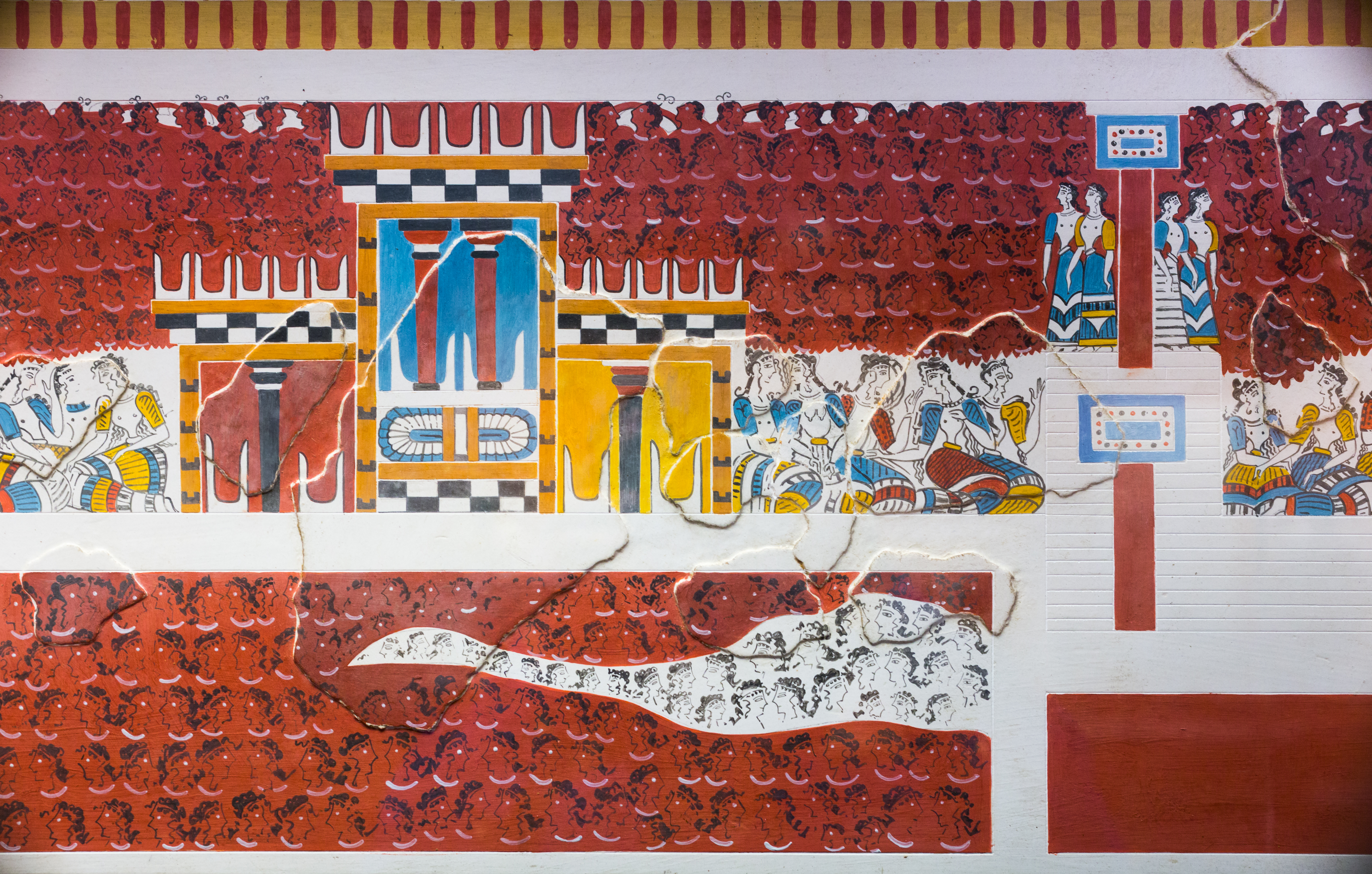
Wall painting usually interpreted as showing a ceremony at or near the Central Court

The West Court formed a major approach to the palace and probably had ceremonial functions. The west wing contained important administrative and ritual areas, including magazines, the Throne Room complex, pillar crypts and repositories. The east wing contained elaborate rooms built into the slope of the hill, including the Hall of the Double Axes and the Queen's Hall. The south and north entrances connected the palace to processional routes and the surrounding town.

The palace's complex arrangement of rooms and passages has long been associated with the later Greek tradition of the Labyrinth.

=== Storage and administration ===
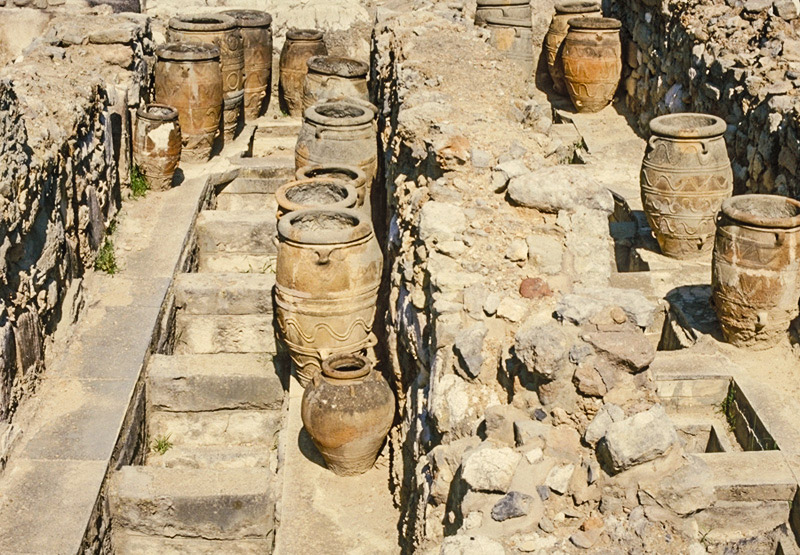
Large storage jars, or pithoi, at Knossos

The palace contained extensive magazines, especially in the west wing. These long storage rooms held large ceramic jars, or pithoi, used for storing oil, grain, wine and other commodities. Storage, recording and redistribution were central features of palatial administration.

Administrative evidence includes sealings and Linear B tablets. These records suggest that the palace controlled or monitored agricultural production, livestock, craft activity and offerings. The use of writing at Knossos is one of the key indicators of its bureaucratic role in the Late Bronze Age.

=== Water, drainage, lighting and ventilation ===
The palace incorporated drains, water channels, light wells, staircases, timber-reinforced masonry and multi-storey construction. The use of light wells, open courts, porticoes, shafts and pier-and-door partitions allowed internal rooms to receive daylight and air despite the density of the building.

Channels, drains and sloped surfaces helped remove rainwater and wastewater from parts of the building, alongside a water-supply system serving the palace.

Because of its position on Kephala hill, the palace also received summer sea breezes. The architectural use of open shafts and light wells has been interpreted as part of a broader environmental strategy in the New Palace period, helping to bring natural light and airflow into the deeper parts of the complex and contributing to internal comfort in warm conditions.

Minoan builders used a variety of materials, including limestone, gypsum, timber, rubble masonry and plaster. Wall paintings, painted plaster, stone revetments and architectural ornament gave parts of the palace a highly decorated appearance.

=== Minoan columns ===
The palace includes examples of the distinctive Minoan column. Unlike later Greek columns, Minoan columns often taper downward. They were usually made from timber, set on stone bases and finished with rounded capitals. Reconstructed examples are now among the most recognisable visual features of Knossos.

=== Frescoes and decoration ===
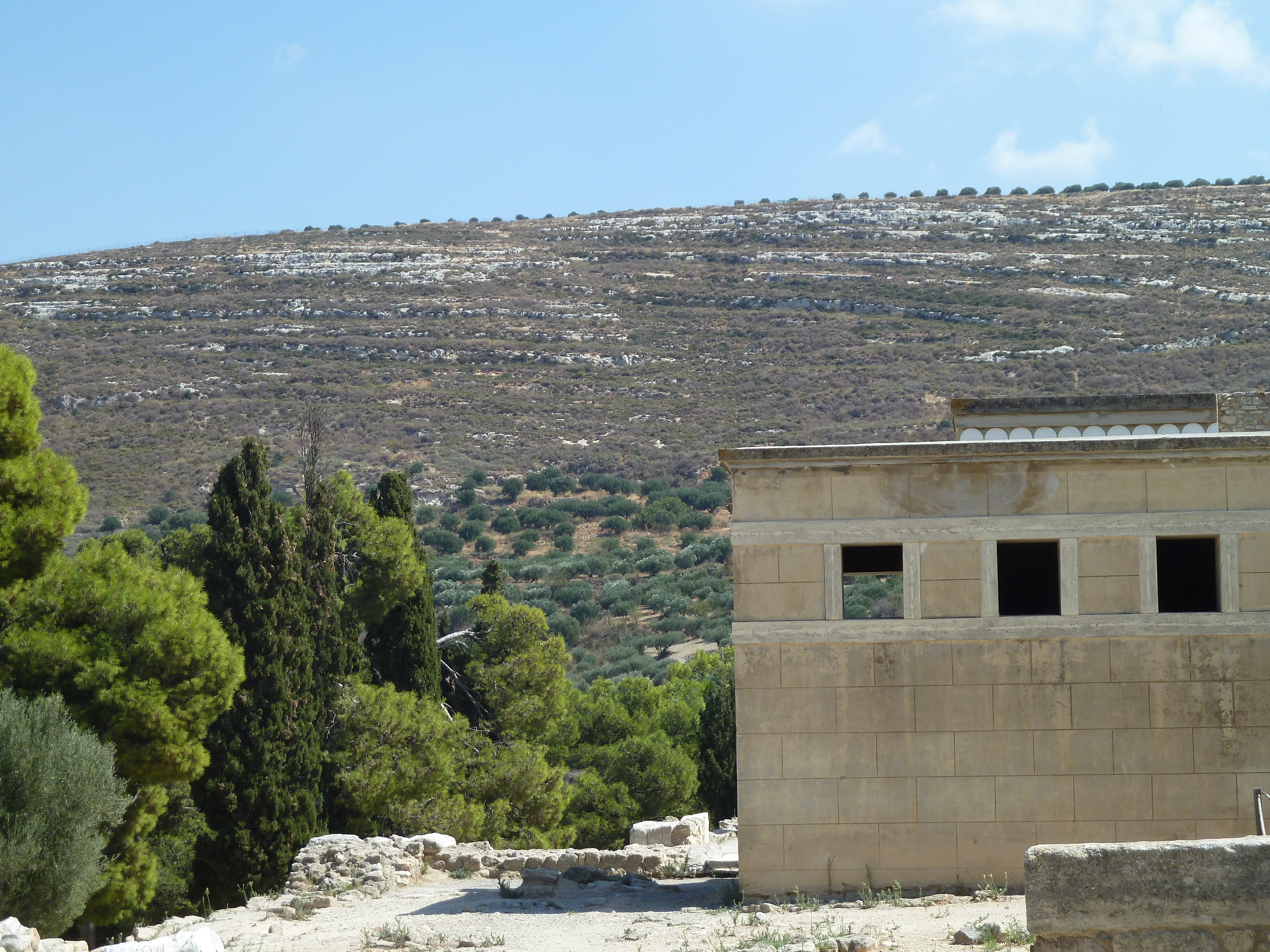
View to the east from the west side of the palace. In the foreground is the west wall of the lustral basin.

Knossos is famous for its frescoes, although many survive only as fragments and some published images are reconstructions. Well-known frescoes associated with the site include the Bull-Leaping Fresco, the Procession Fresco, the Cup-Bearer, the Dolphin Fresco, the Sacred Grove fresco and the image often called the Prince of the Lilies.

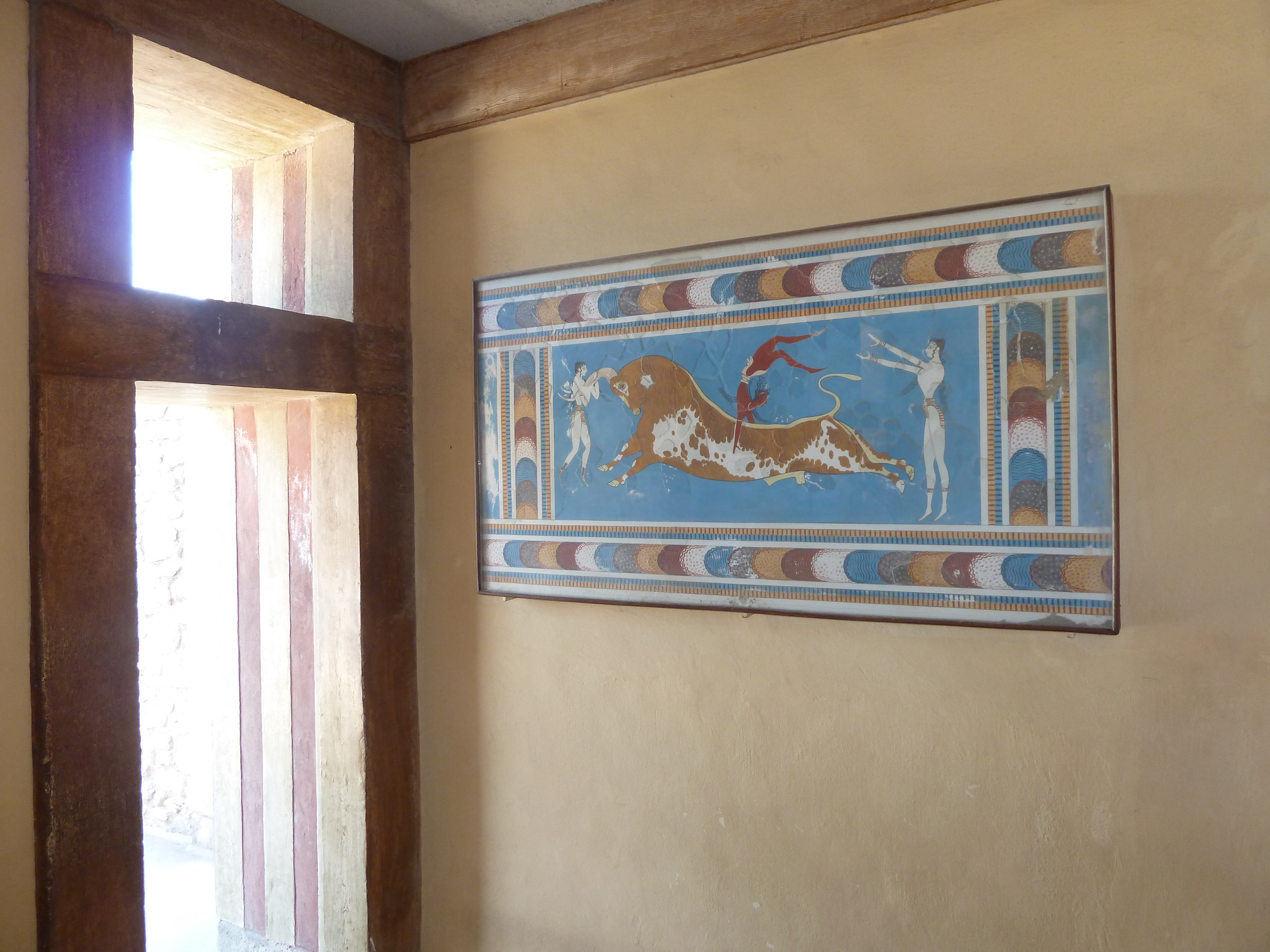
Bull-leaping fresco reconstruction at Knossos

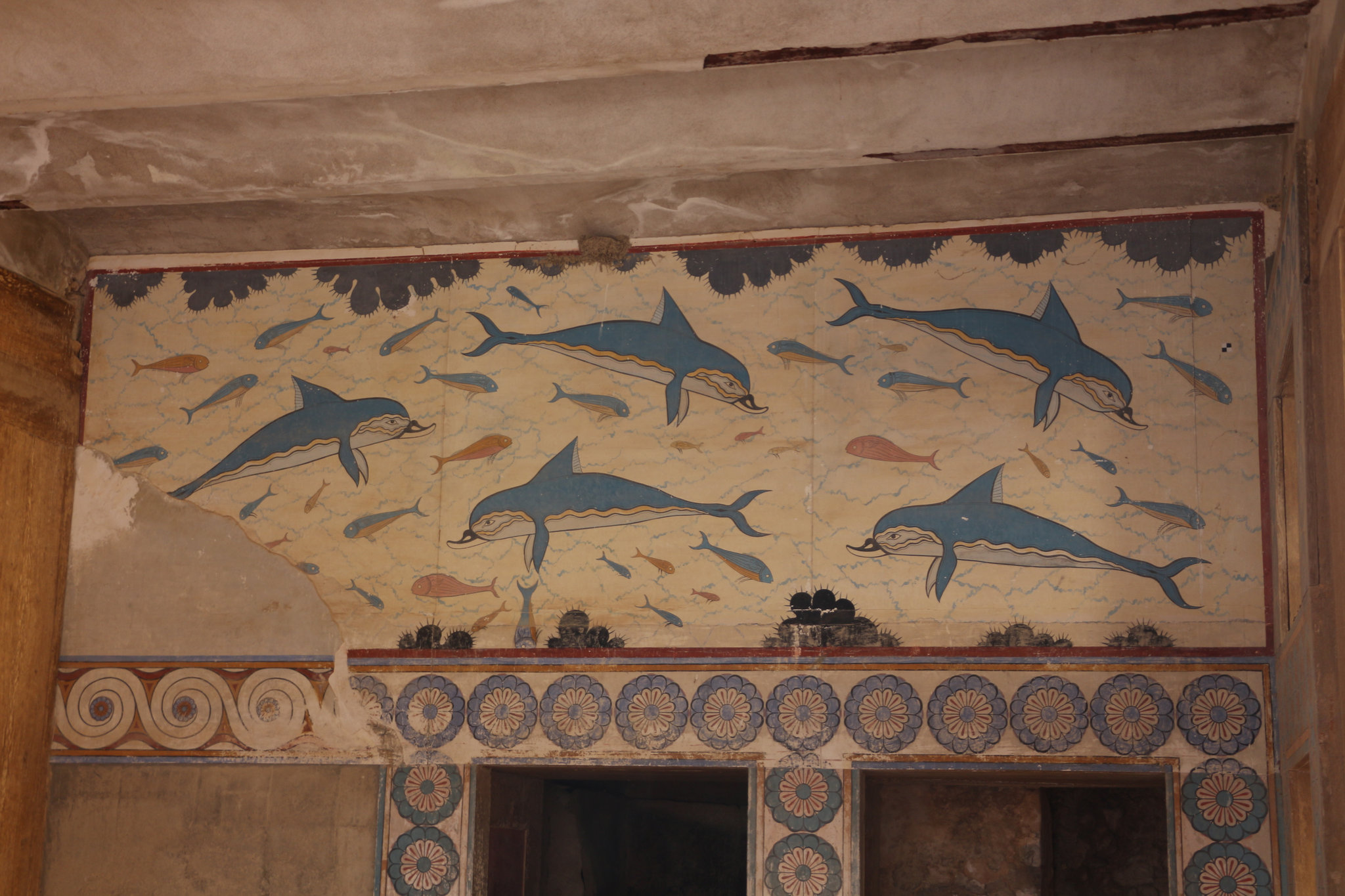
Dolphin fresco reconstruction

The frescoes show processions, animals, plants, marine life, ritual scenes and human figures. Their interpretation is complicated by the fragmentary condition of the originals and the extent of later reconstruction: familiar compositions may combine surviving ancient fragments with modern additions.

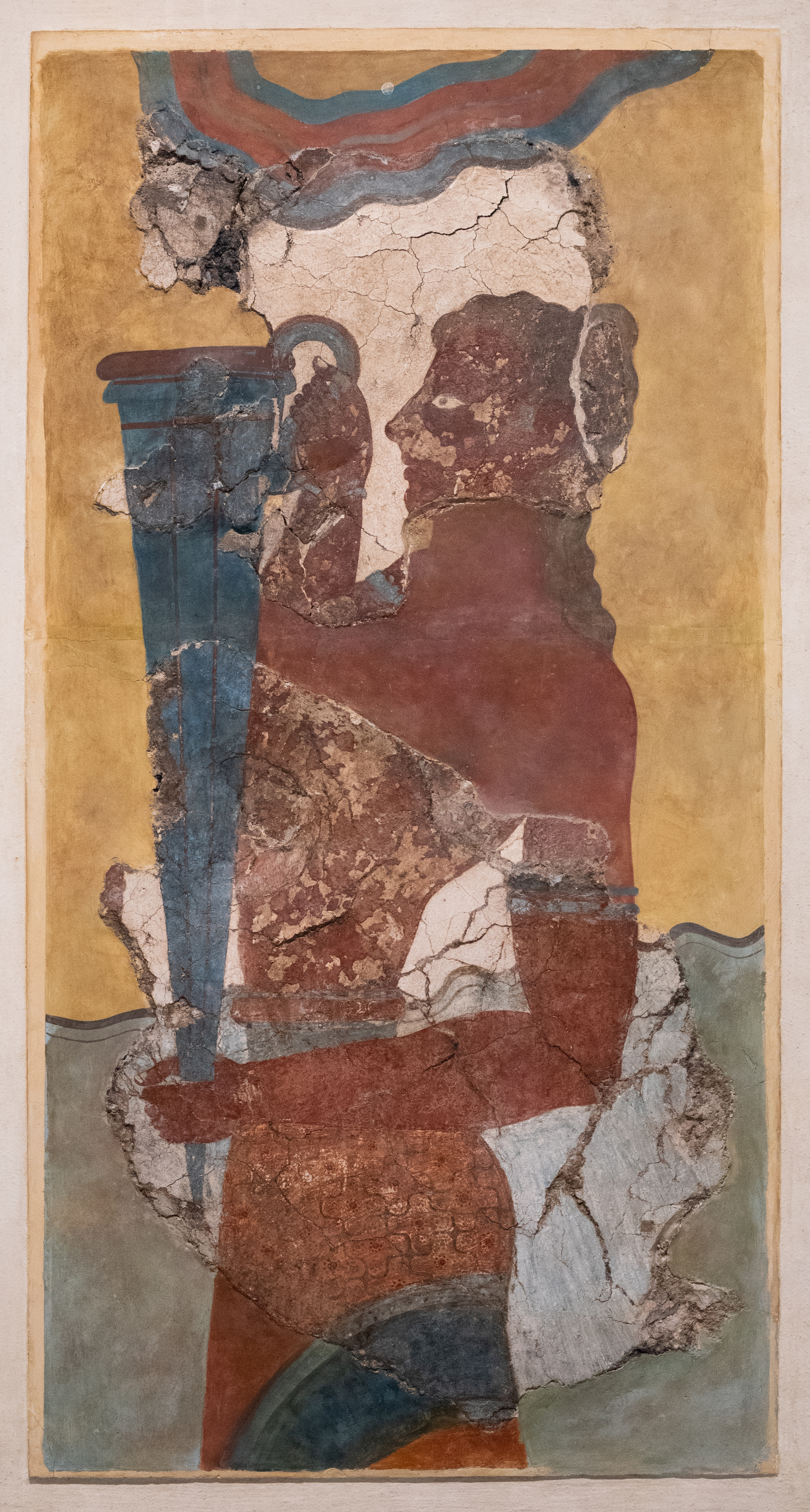
Cup-Bearer fresco

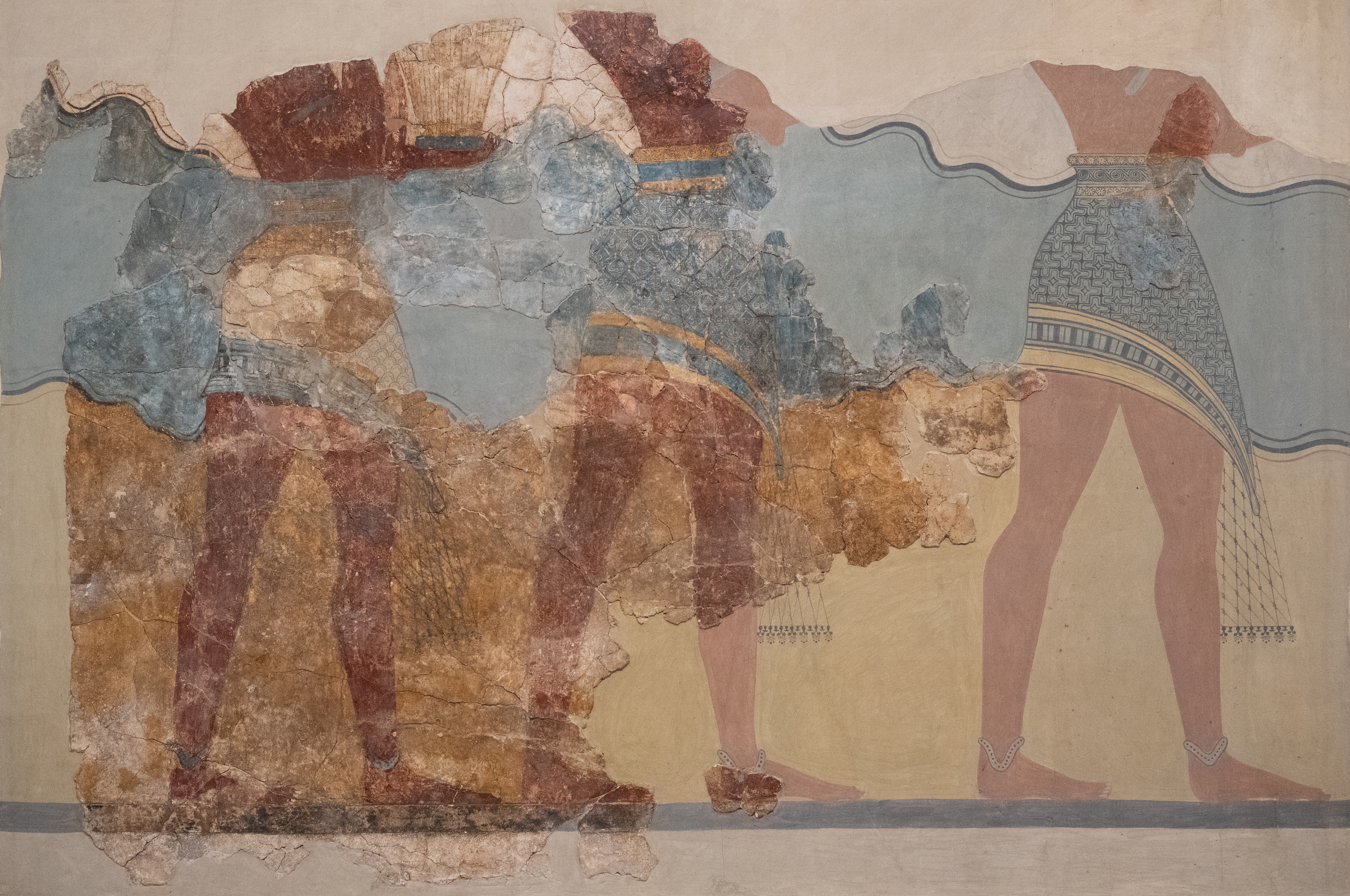
Procession fresco

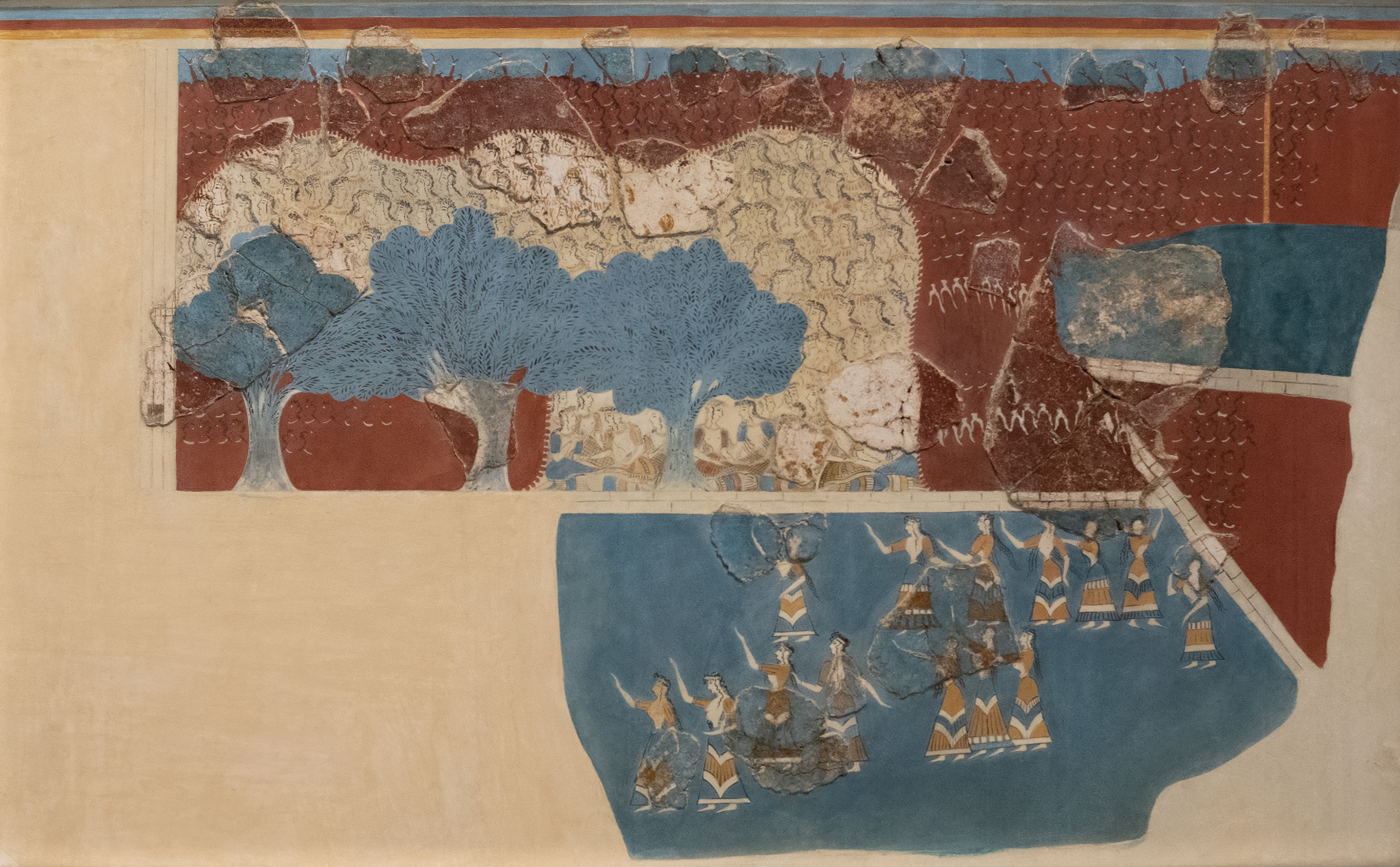
Sacred Grove fresco

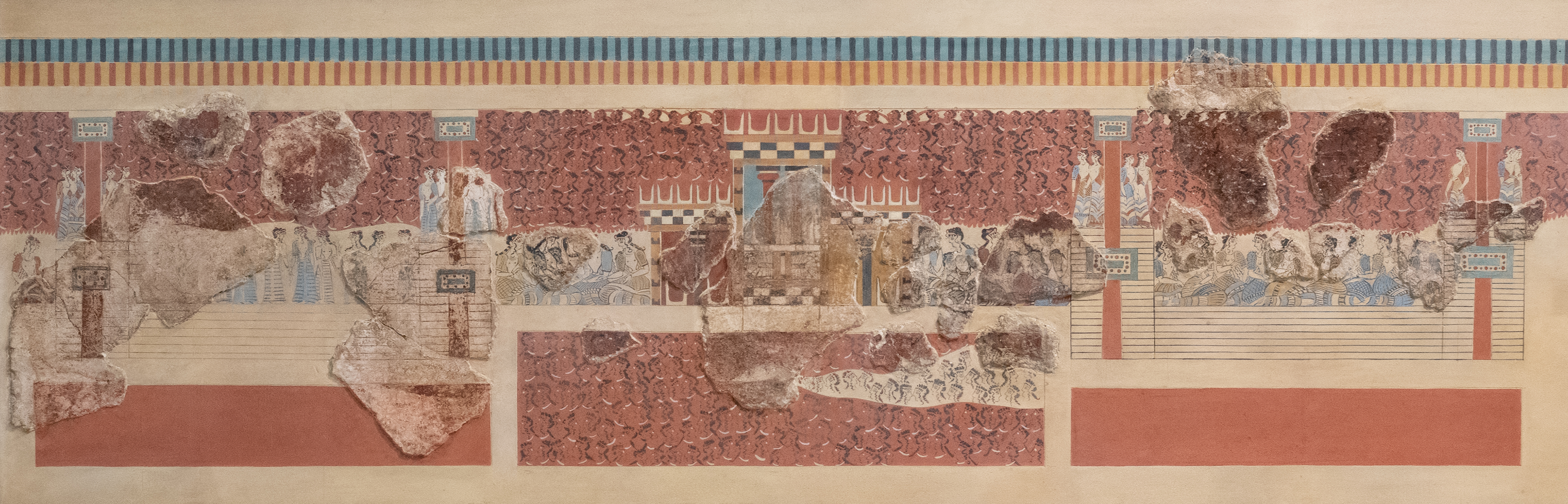
Grandstand fresco

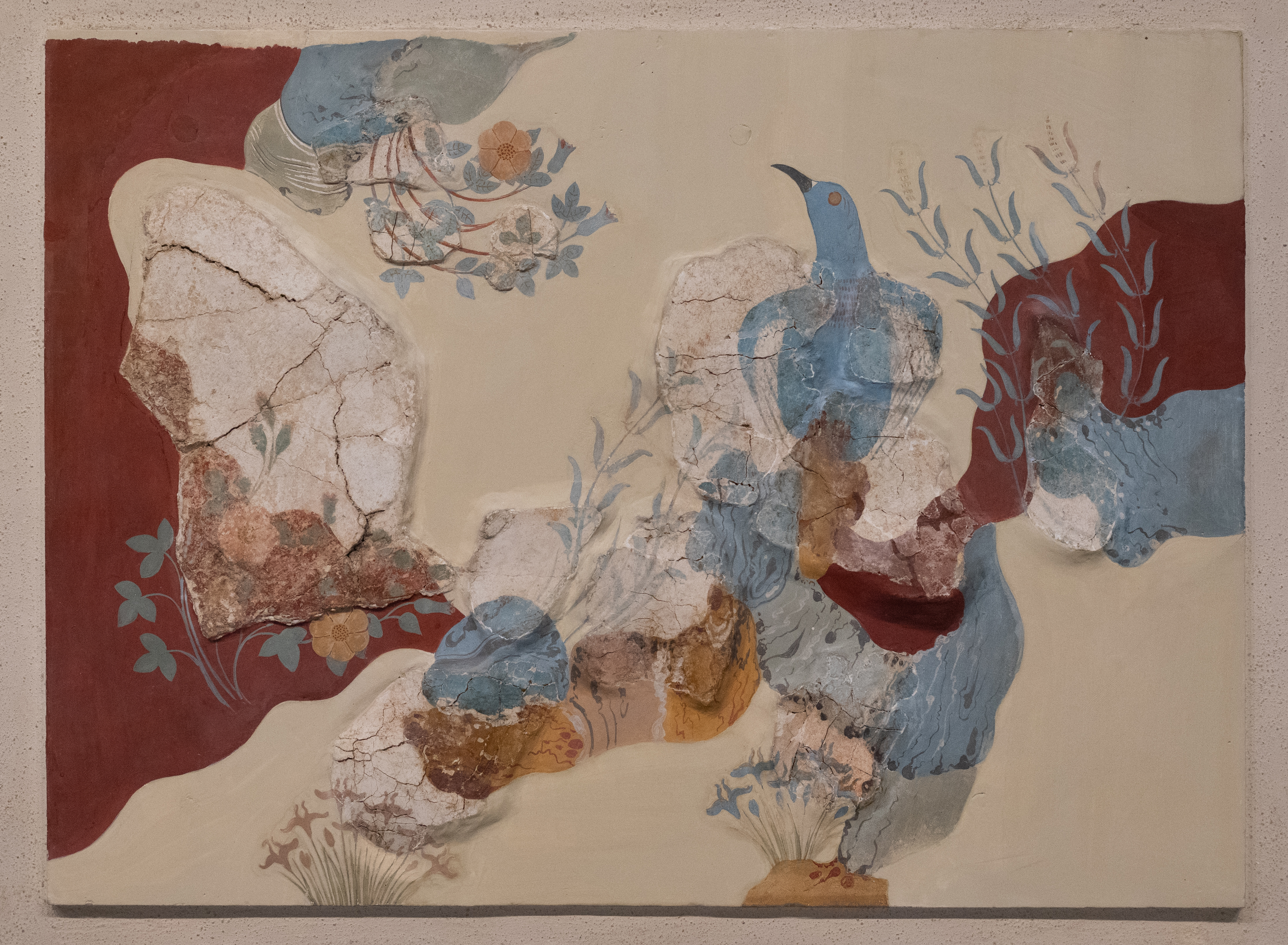
Blue Birds fresco

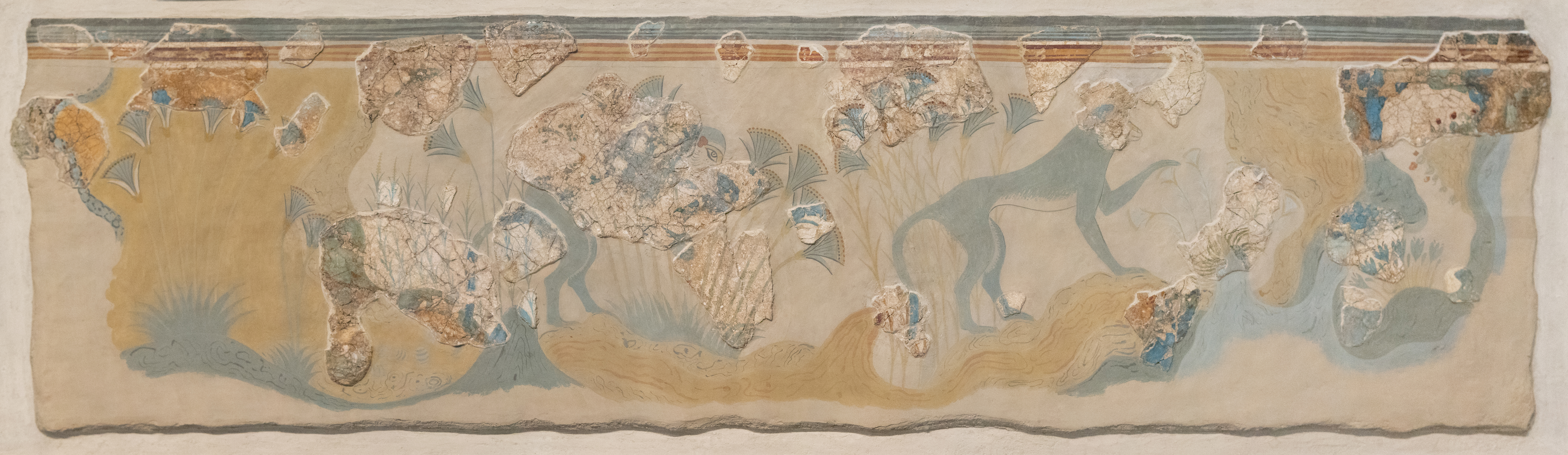
Blue Monkeys fresco

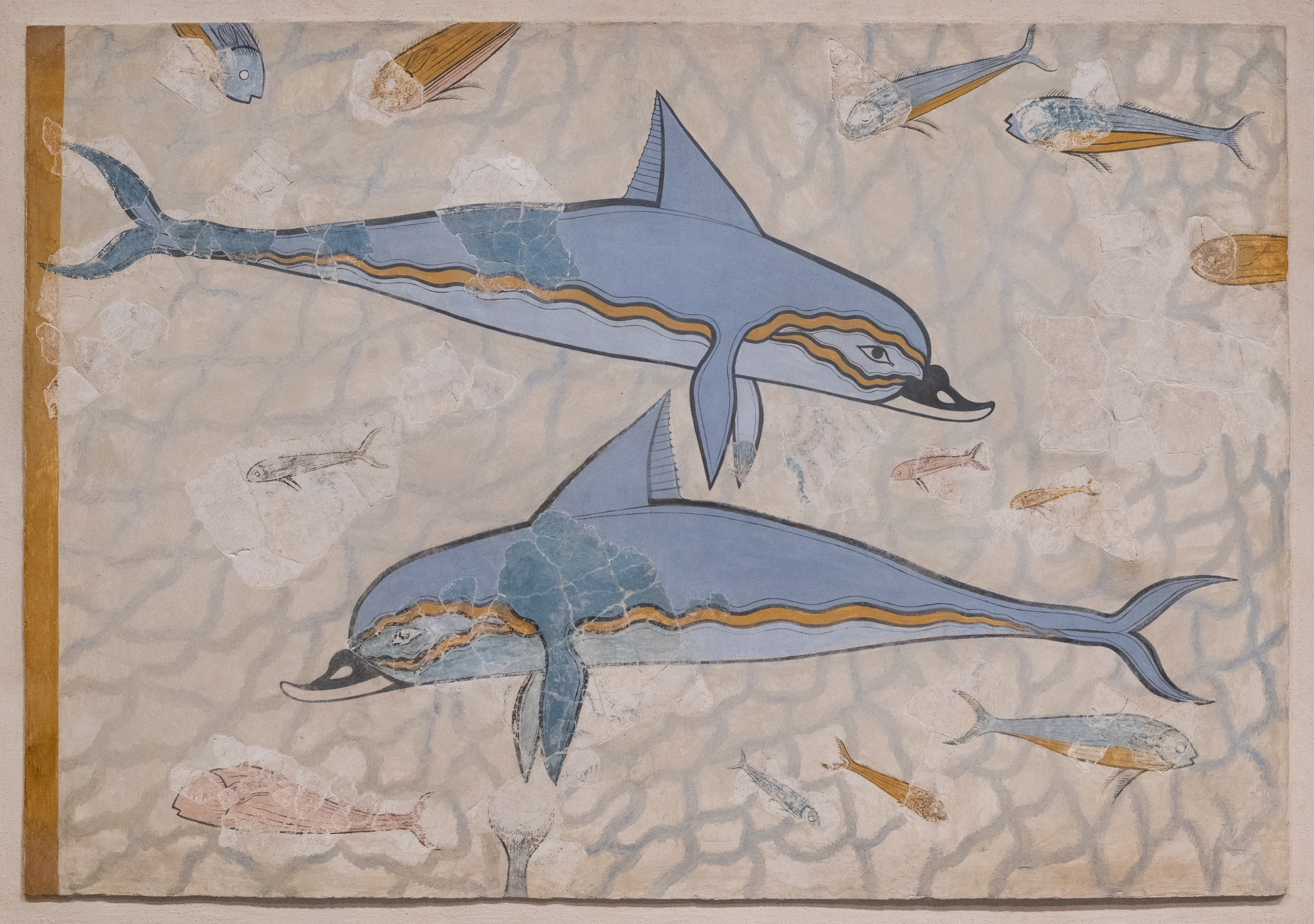
Dolphin fresco

=== Throne Room ===
The Throne Room complex is one of the most visited areas of the palace. It contains a gypsum seat set against the wall, benches, a lustral basin and painted griffins. Evans interpreted the room as the throne room of King Minos. Later scholarship has proposed other interpretations, including ritual or priestly use. The function of the room remains debated.

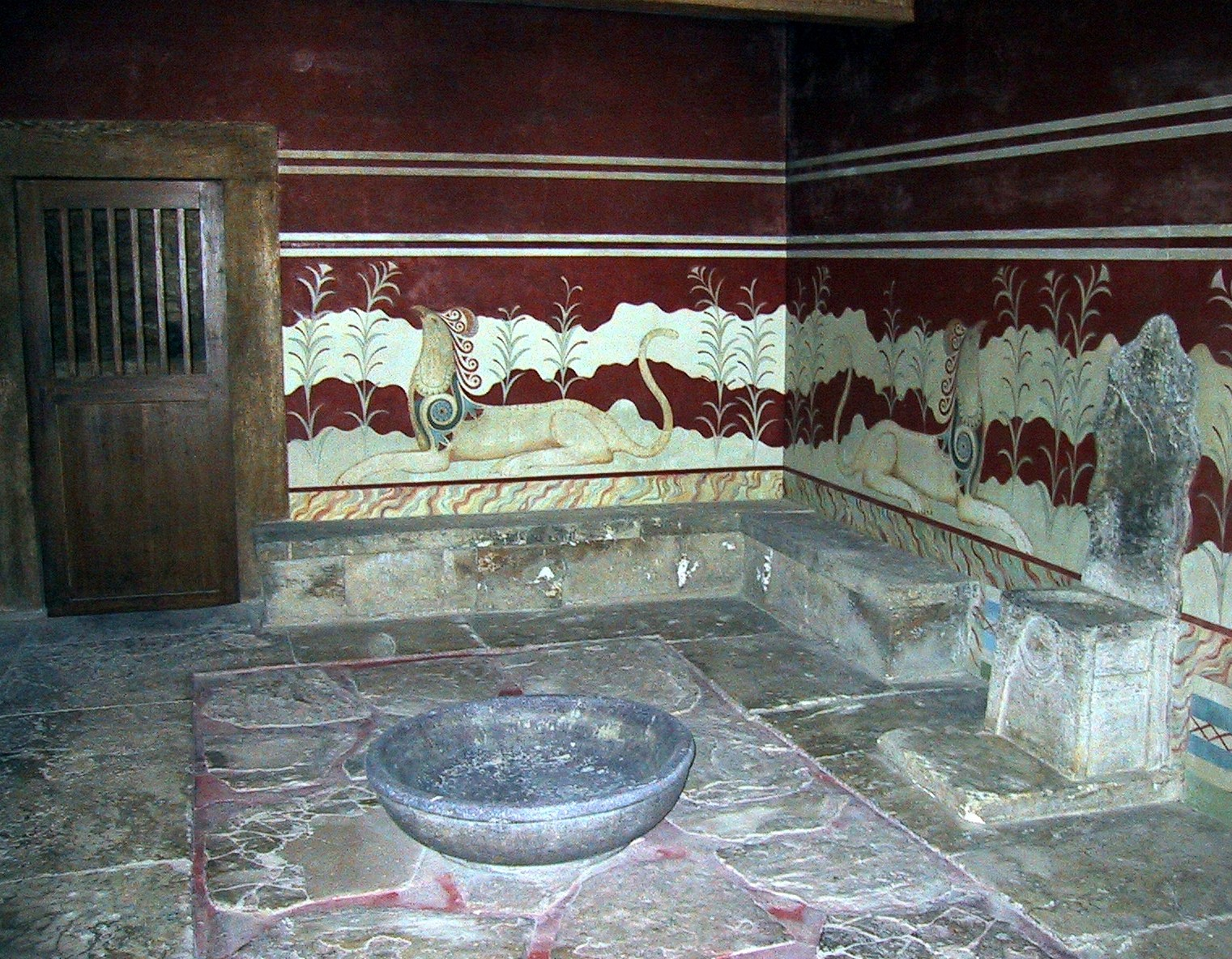
The throne from which the room was named

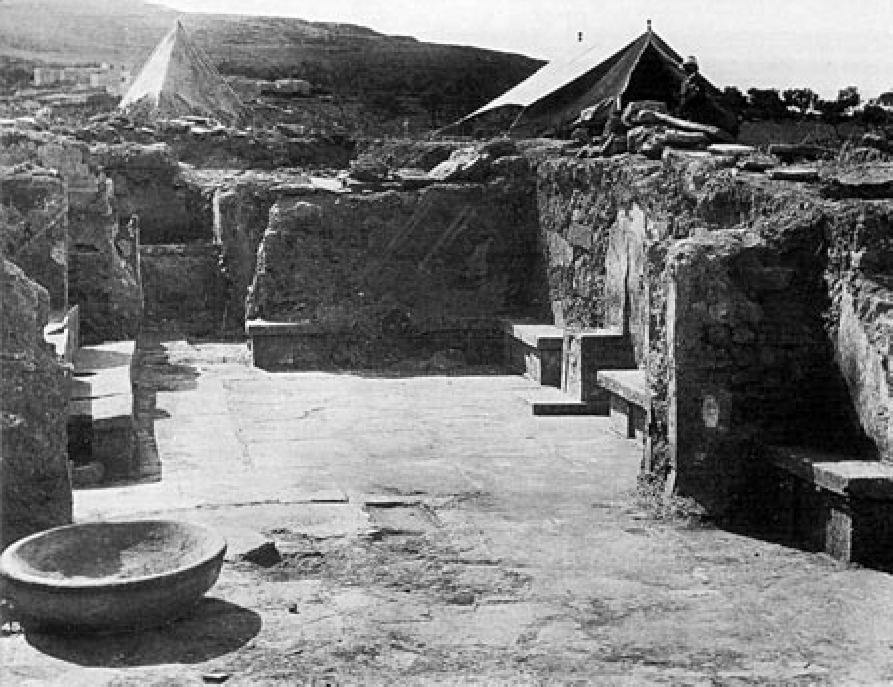
The Throne Room before reconstruction

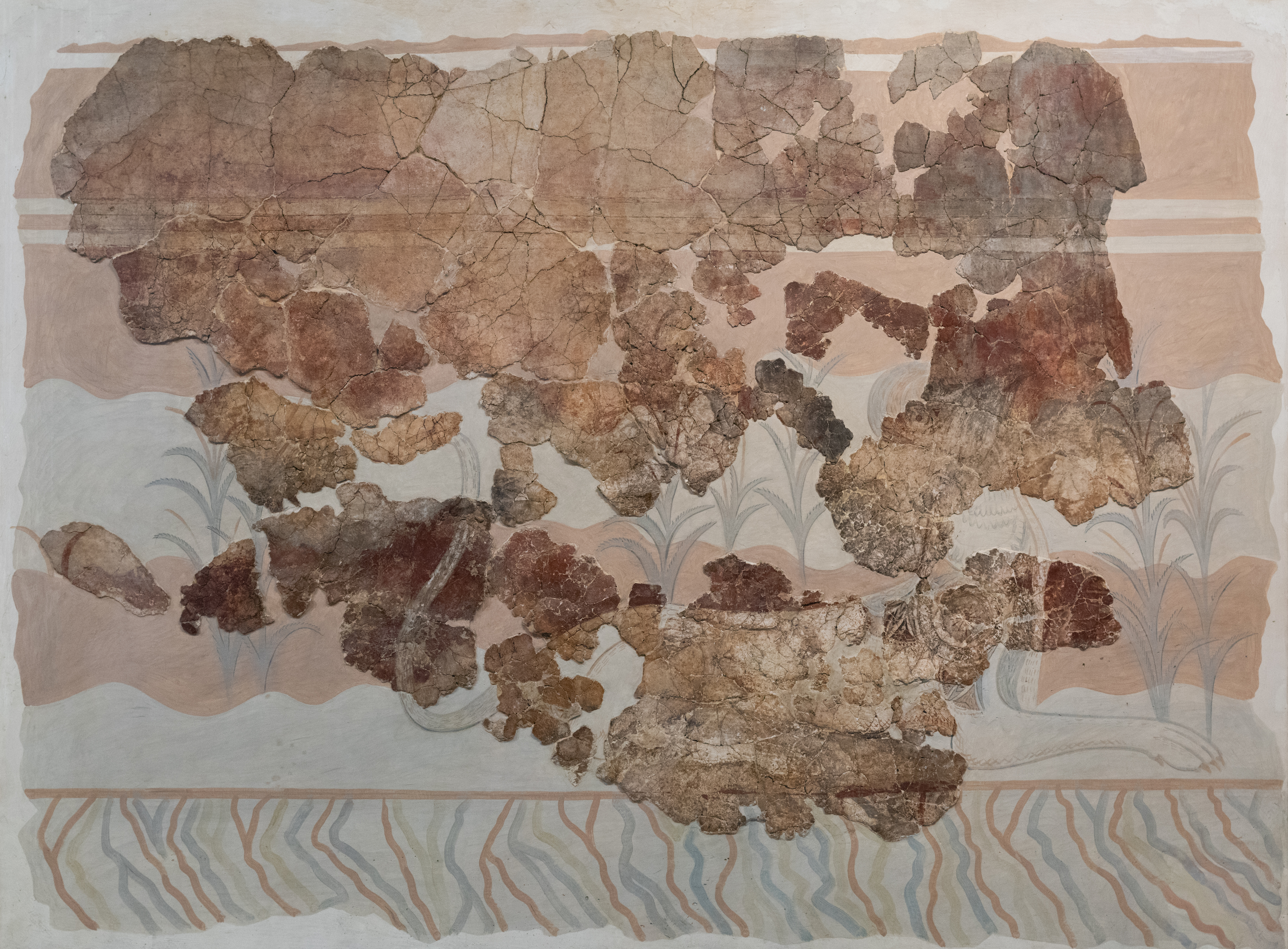
Throne Room grass fresco

=== Surrounding buildings ===
Important structures around the palace include the Small Palace, the Royal Villa, the South House, the Caravanserai, the Temple Tomb and the Theatral Area. These structures formed part of the town and its ceremonial spaces.

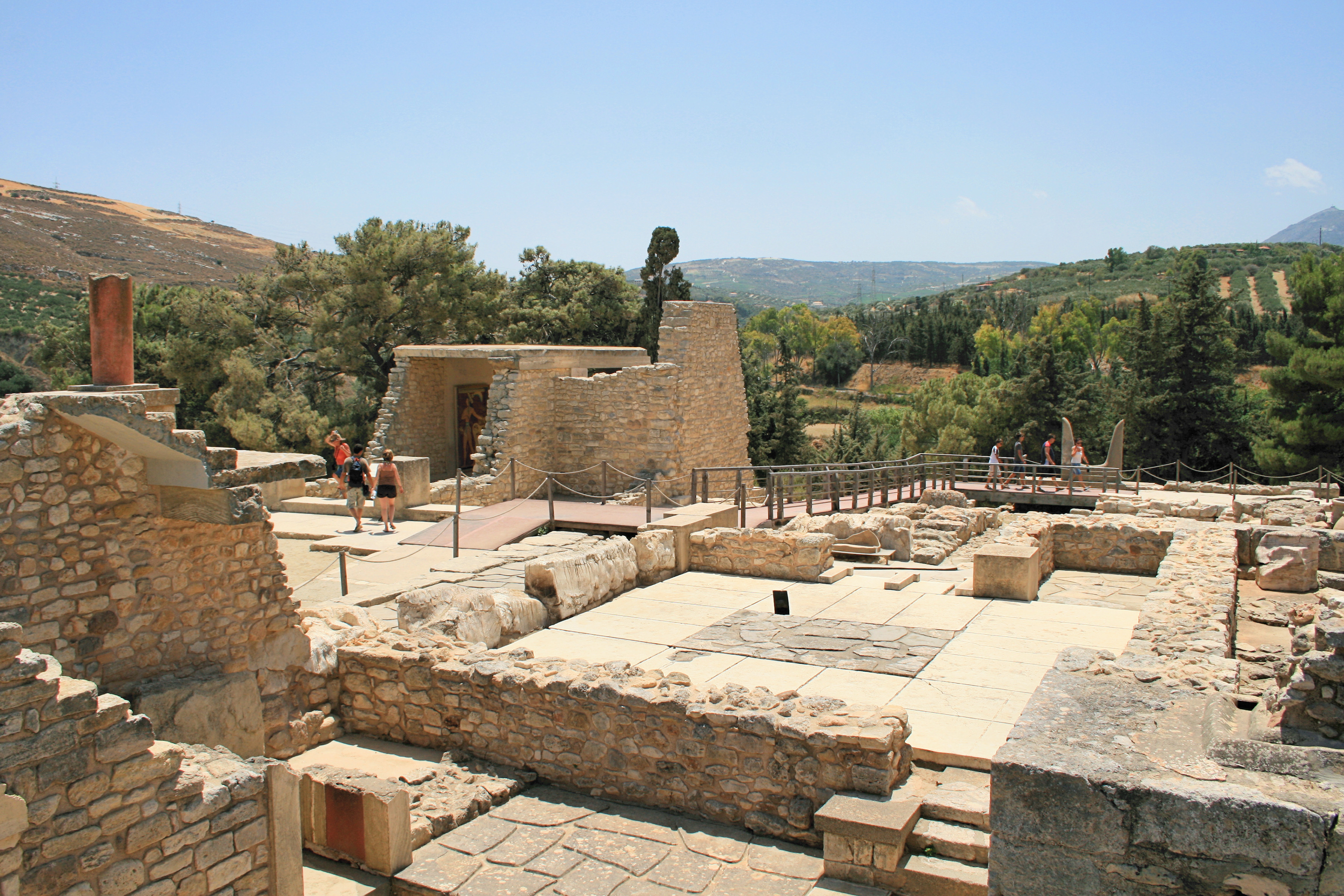
Restored area of the palace at Knossos

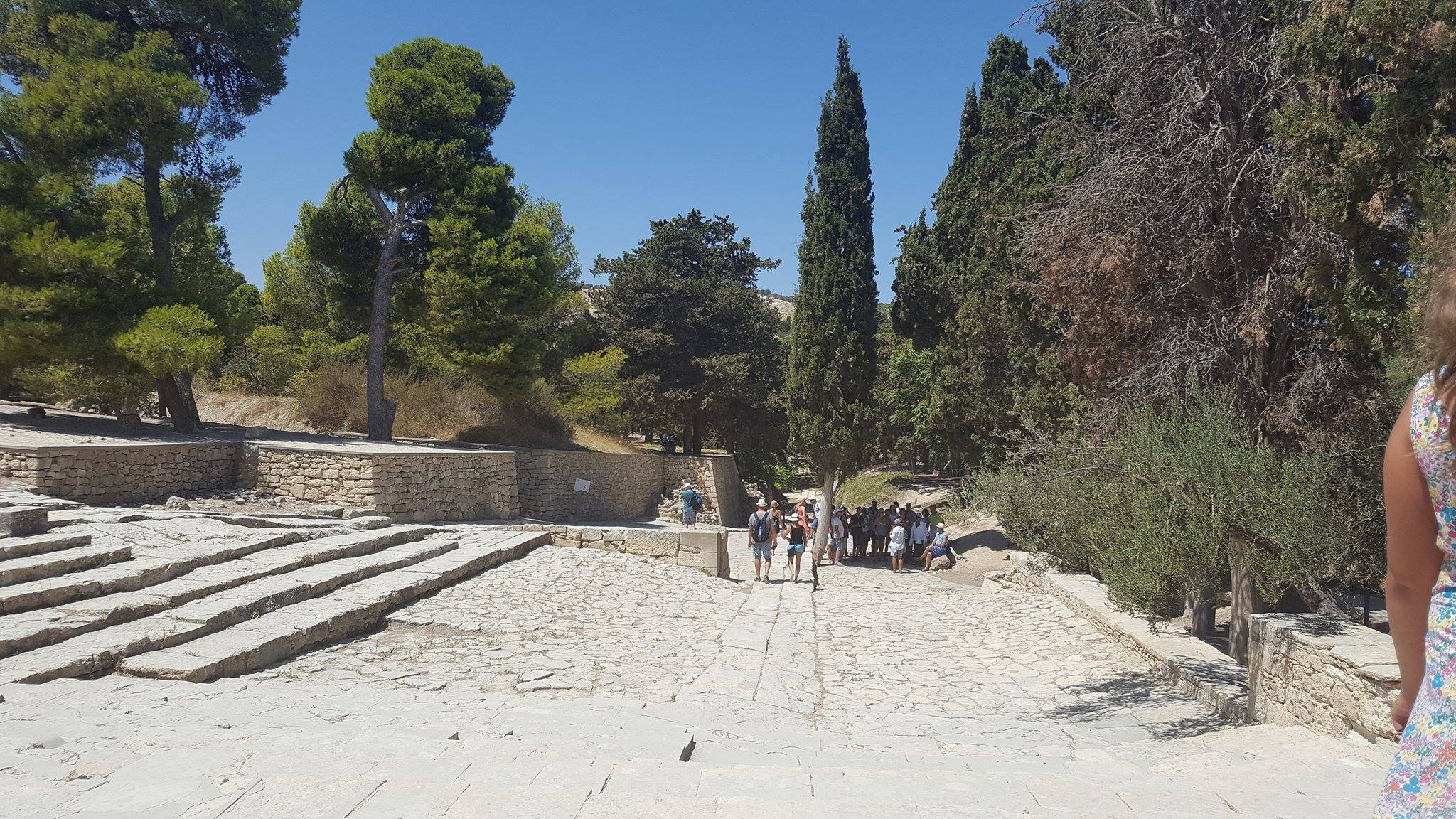
The Central Court of the palace

The Royal Road connected the palace area with parts of the surrounding town. In later periods, Greek and Roman buildings occupied parts of the same landscape, including houses, sanctuaries, tombs and the Roman Villa of Dionysos.

== Writing and administration ==
Knossos is a major site for the study of Aegean writing. Minoan administration used scripts including Cretan hieroglyphs and Linear A, which remains undeciphered. After the Mycenaean takeover, Knossos produced a major archive of Linear B tablets, written in an early form of Greek.

The Linear B tablets record administrative matters such as livestock, textiles, landholding, personnel, offerings and commodities. They show that the later palace operated as a bureaucratic centre with organised systems of record-keeping.

UNESCO has identified Cretan Hieroglyphic and Linear A as two of the earliest writing systems in Europe, developed in Crete at the beginning of the second millennium BC.

== Finds ==
Many of the most important finds from Knossos are housed in the Heraklion Archaeological Museum. These include fresco fragments, pottery, stone vessels, seal stones, figurines, bronze objects, jewellery and Linear B tablets.

The so-called snake goddess figurines from Knossos are among the most famous objects associated with Minoan religion. Their precise meaning remains debated, but they have become iconic images of Minoan culture.

The Linear B tablets from Knossos were central to the decipherment of Linear B by Michael Ventris and John Chadwick. Their decipherment showed that the tablets recorded an early form of Greek, changing the understanding of Late Bronze Age Crete and the Mycenaean world.

== Conservation and tourism ==
Knossos is one of the most visited archaeological sites in Greece. Its fame rests on the scale of the palace, its mythological associations, its reconstructed architecture and its importance in the study of European prehistory.

Conservation at Knossos is complex because of the age of the remains, the high number of visitors and the early twentieth-century reconstructions carried out by Evans. These reconstructions are now part of the history of the site, but they also require continued monitoring and maintenance.

The modern visitor experience is shaped by both ancient remains and twentieth-century interpretation. The reconstructed columns, frescoes and architectural elements help communicate the palace visually, but they also require careful explanation because they do not always distinguish clearly between excavated remains and modern reconstruction.

== UNESCO World Heritage Site ==
In 2025, Knossos was inscribed on the UNESCO World Heritage List as part of the serial property Minoan Palatial Centres. The property includes six Cretan palatial sites: Knossos, Phaistos, Malia, Zakros, Zominthos and Kydonia. UNESCO recognised the sites under criteria ii, iii, iv and vi for their evidence of Minoan civilisation, early urban development, monumental architecture, writing systems, maritime networks and enduring mythological influence.

== Notable residents ==
- Epimenides, semi-legendary Cretan seer and philosopher
- Aenesidemus, philosopher associated with Pyrrhonist scepticism
- Chersiphron, architect traditionally associated with the Temple of Artemis at Ephesus

== See also ==
- Minoan civilization
- Minoan palaces
- Minoan chronology
- Linear A
- Linear B
- Heraklion Archaeological Museum
- Phaistos
- Malia
- Zakros
- Zominthos
- Kydonia
