= Prassa =

Minoan building complex in southeast of Iraklio, Crete

Prassa (also Prassas) is the archaeological site of an ancient Minoan settlement on Crete.

== Archaeology ==
Two Middle Minoan houses were uncovered at Prassa, which were in use until Late Minoan I.
