= Heraklion Archaeological Museum =

- Αρχαιολογικό Μουσείο Ηρακλείου
- Established: 1883
- Location: Heraklion, Crete, Greece
- Coordinates: 35°20′21″N 25°08′15″E
- Type: Archaeological museum
- Website: http://heraklionmuseum.gr

The Heraklion Archaeological Museum is a museum located in Heraklion on Crete. It is one of the largest museums in Greece, and the best in the world for Minoan art, as it contains by far the most important and complete collection of artefacts of the Minoan civilization of Crete. It is normally referred to scholarship in English as "AMH" (for "Archaeological Museum of Heraklion"), a form still sometimes used by the museum in itself.

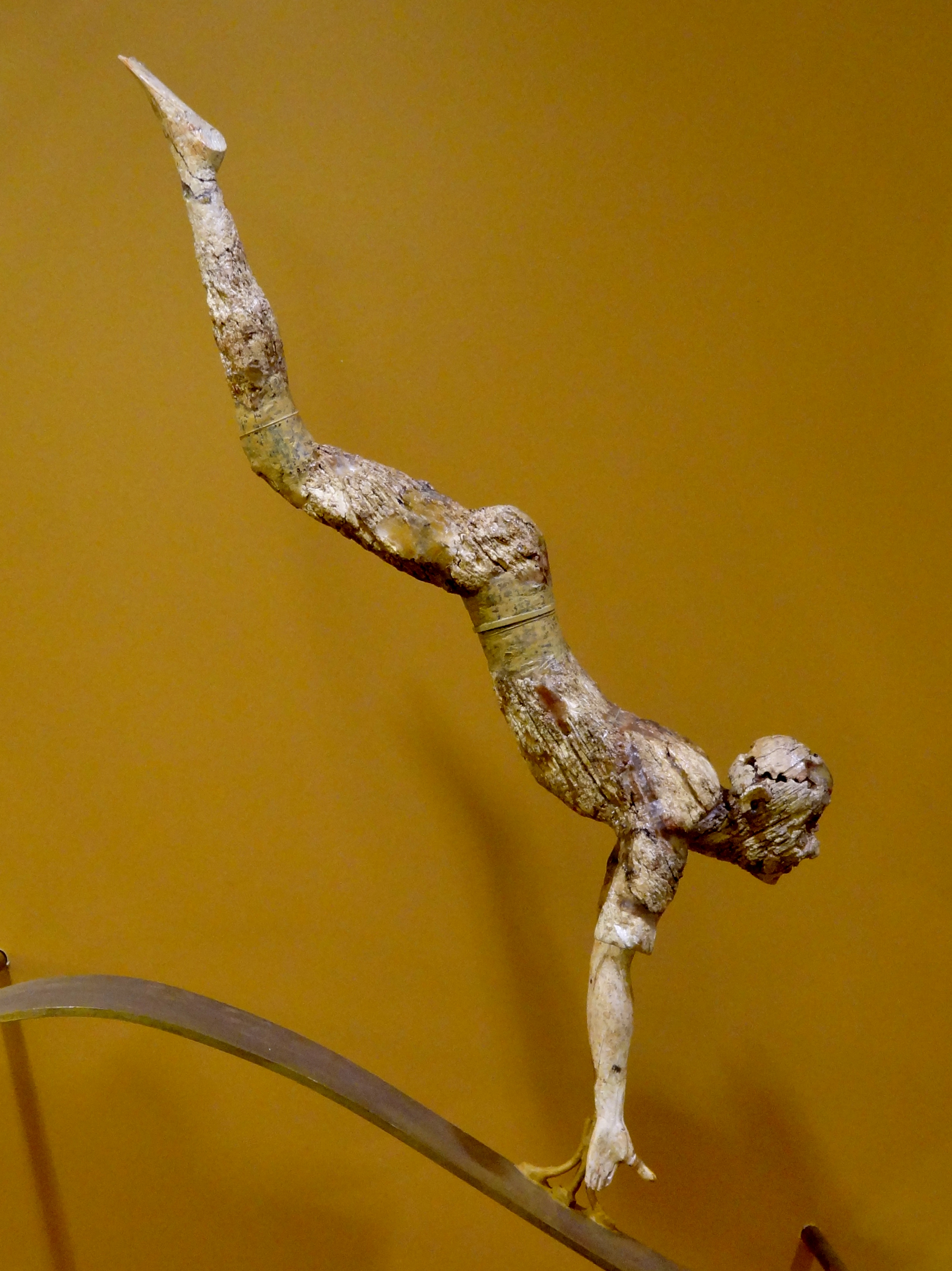
The bull leaper (c. 1500 BC), an ivory figurine from the palace of Knossos

The museum holds the great majority of the finds from the Minoan palace at Knossos and other Minoan sites in Crete.

== History ==
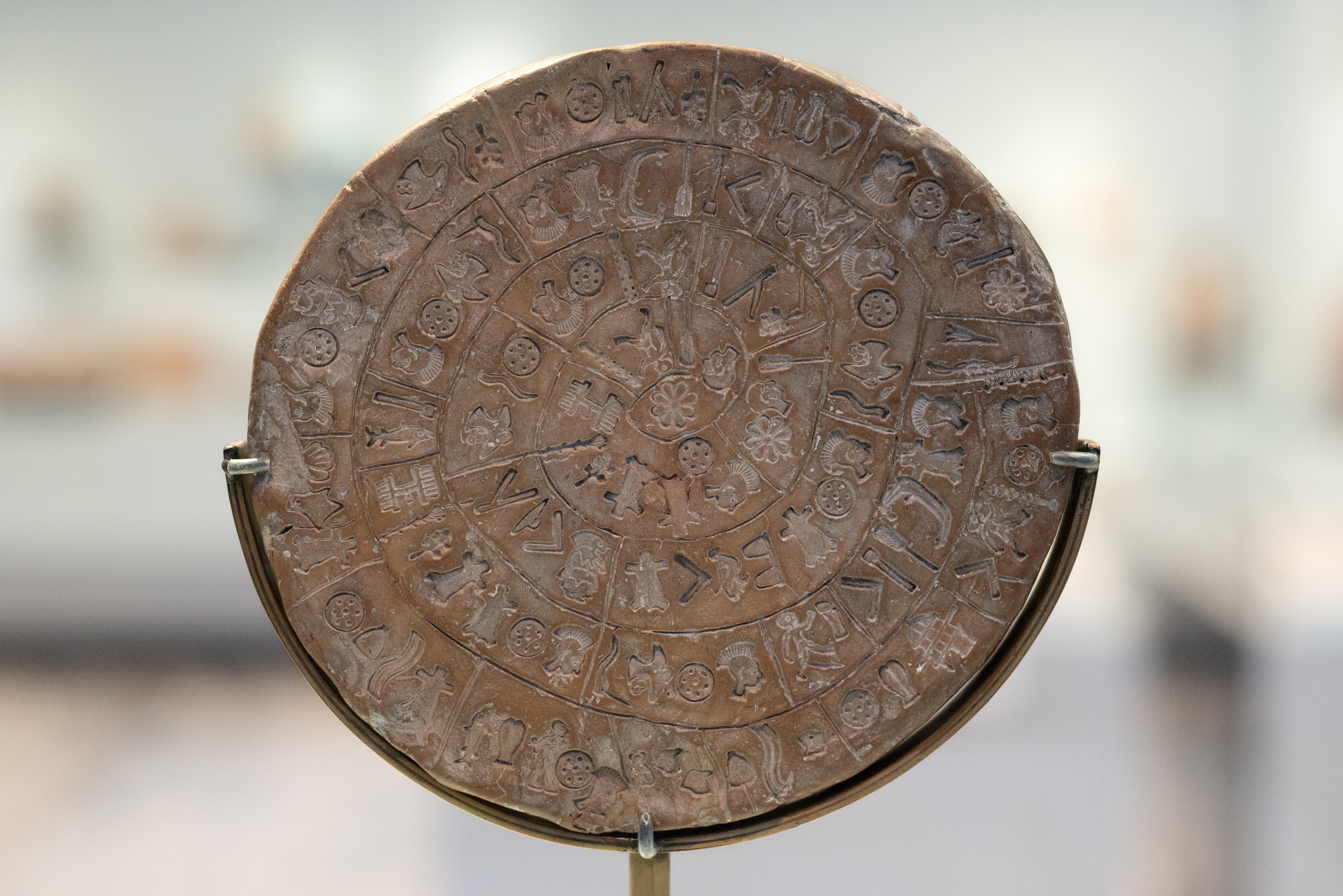
Phaistos Disc

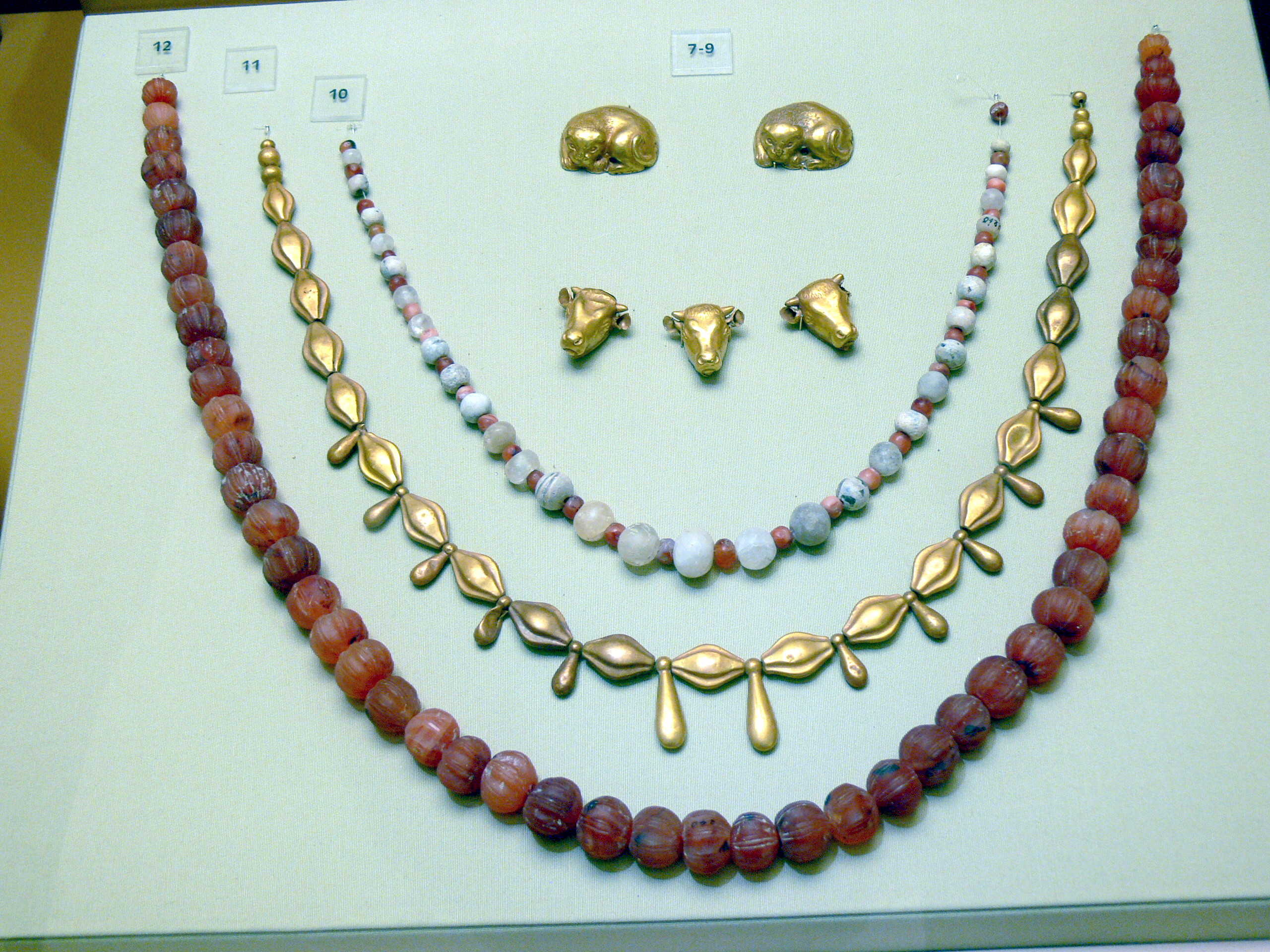
Minoan jewellery

The museum began in 1883 as a simple collection of antiquities; it was about the time when the Minoan civilization was beginning to be rediscovered, and shortly before the first excavations using proper scientific methods. It was also during the period when Crete was a virtually autonomous part of the Ottoman Empire, after the Pact of Halepa of 1878, later followed by the independent Cretan State (1898-1913), protected by a military occupation by the Great Powers. The political situation helped to keep Cretan finds on the island during a crucial period of discoveries.

A dedicated building was constructed from 1904 to 1912 at the instigation of two Cretan archaeologists, Iosif Hatzidakis and Stefanos Xanthoudidis. It was built upon the ruins of the Roman Catholic monastery of Saint-Francis which was destroyed by earthquake in 1856. After three destructive earthquakes in 1926, 1930, and 1935, the museum nearly collapsed. The director of the Heraklion Museum was then Spyridon Marinatos, who made great efforts to find funds and persuade the locals and the central government alike that a new solid building was needed. In 1935, Marinatos succeeded in engaging architect Patroklos Karantinos to build a sturdy structure that has withstood both natural disasters and the bombing that accompanied the German invasion in 1941. Although the museum was damaged during World War II, the collection survived intact and again became accessible to the public in 1952. A new wing was added in 1964.

The Herakleion Archaeological Museum is one of the largest museums in Greece. The building is two stories tall, and its exhibition is laid out in 27 rooms. The museum is an example of modernist architecture and was awarded a Bauhaus commendation for its design. The building incorporates colors and construction materials, such as multicolored veined marble, that are reminiscent of the painted imitation marble walls of Minoan palaces.

The museum holds artifacts from 5,500 years of Cretan history, spanning from the Neolithic period to Roman times. The museum prides itself for its collection of unique Minoan art.

Most of the museum was closed for renovation from 2006 and reopened in May 2013. These renovations were co-funded by the European Union.

Four of the museum's exhibits were toppled over and damaged during a magnitude 6.2 earthquake on 22 May 2025.

== Collections ==
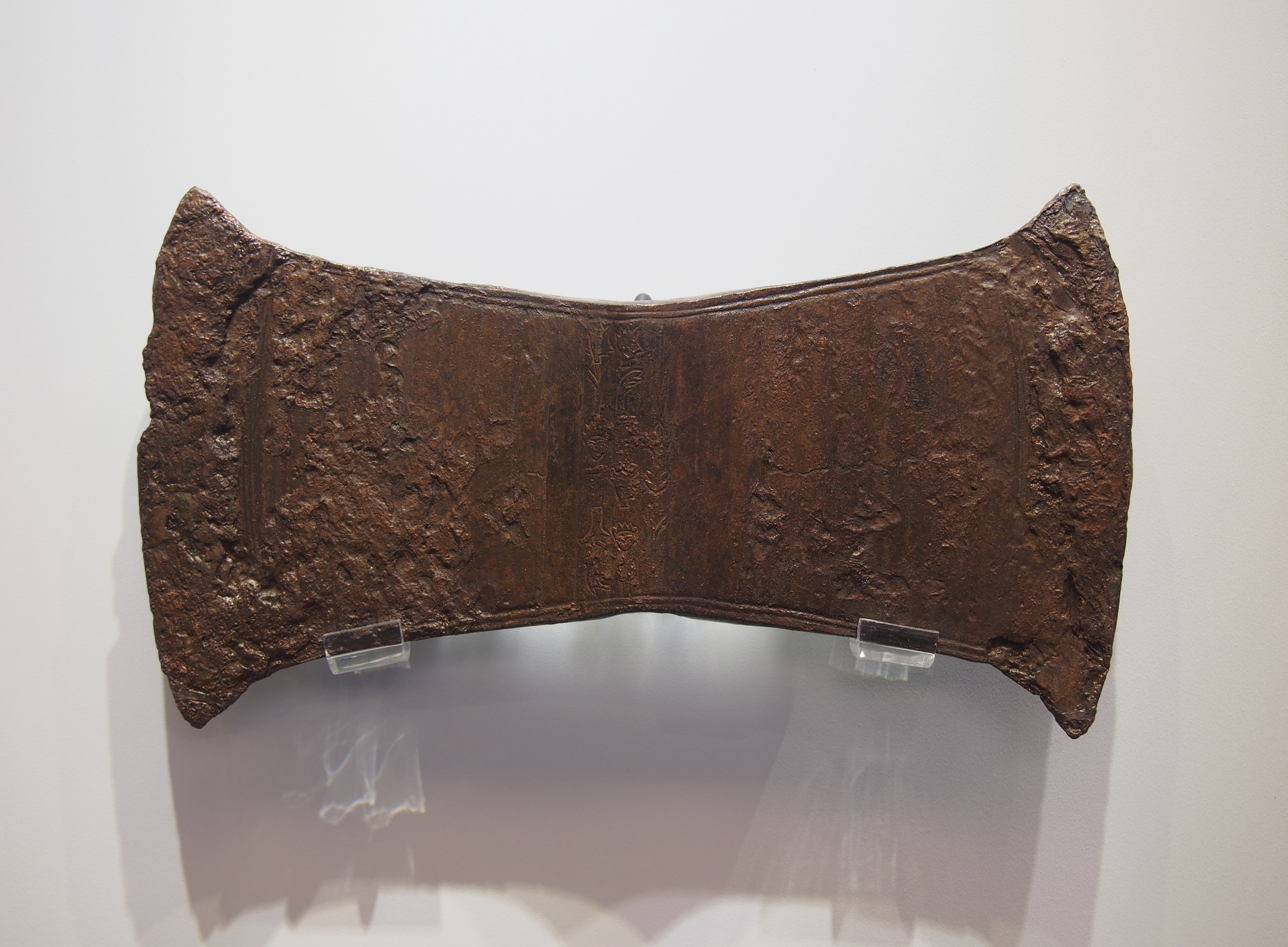
Arkalochori Axe

=== Room I ===
Covers findings from 6000 BCE to the pre-Palatial period, including:

- Neolithic fertility goddess
- Vasiliki ware
- Stone jars from the island of Mochlos
- Miniature clay sculptures

=== Room II ===
Covers findings from 2000 BCE to 1700 BCE in Knossos, Malia and several peak sanctuaries, including:

- Kamares ware pottery
- Glazed plaques of Minoan houses (aka the "Town Mosaic")
- Peak sanctuary figurines

=== Room III ===
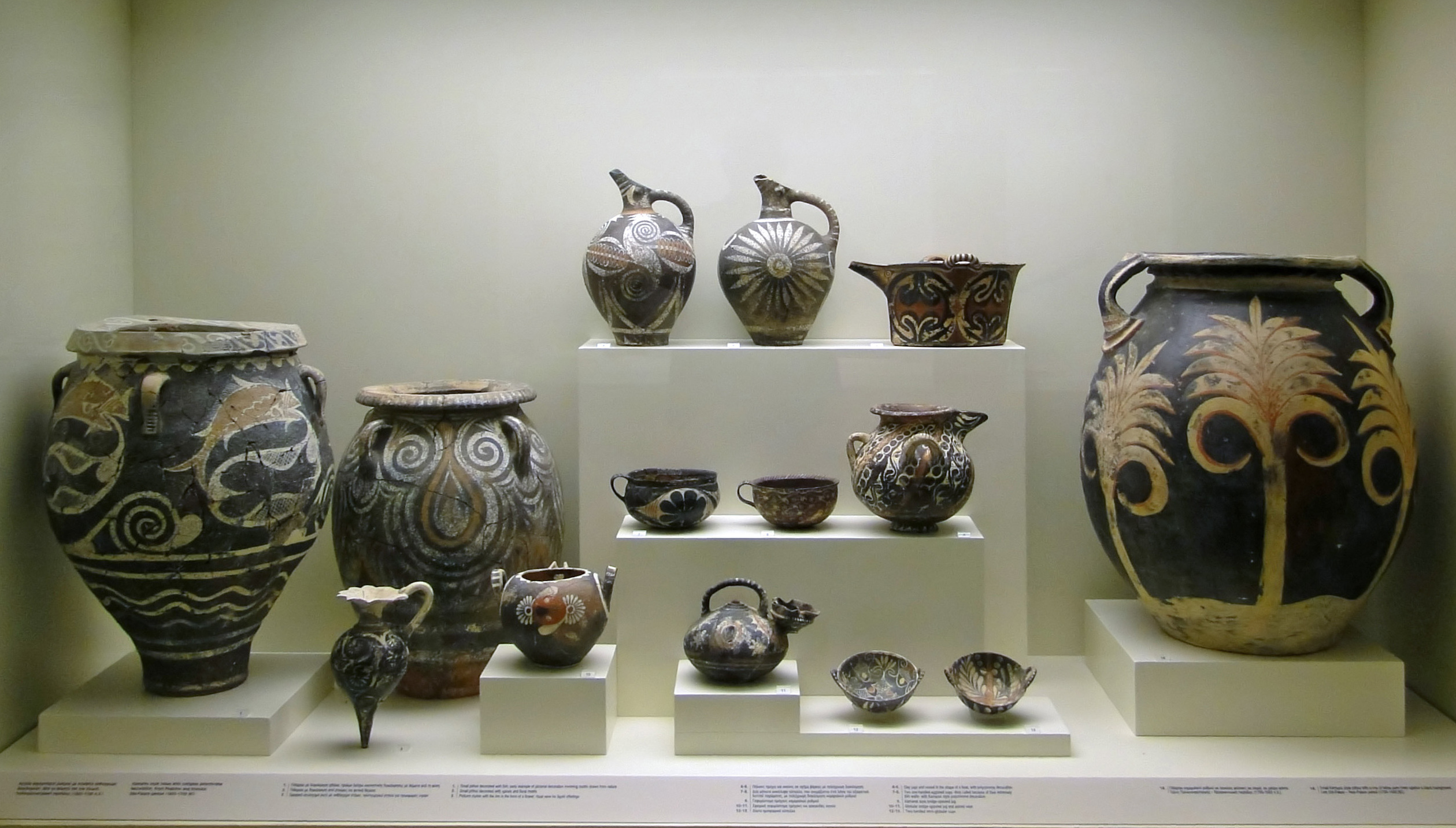
Kamares style vases from Phaistos and Knossos

- Phaistos Disc
- Kamares ware pottery

=== Room IV ===
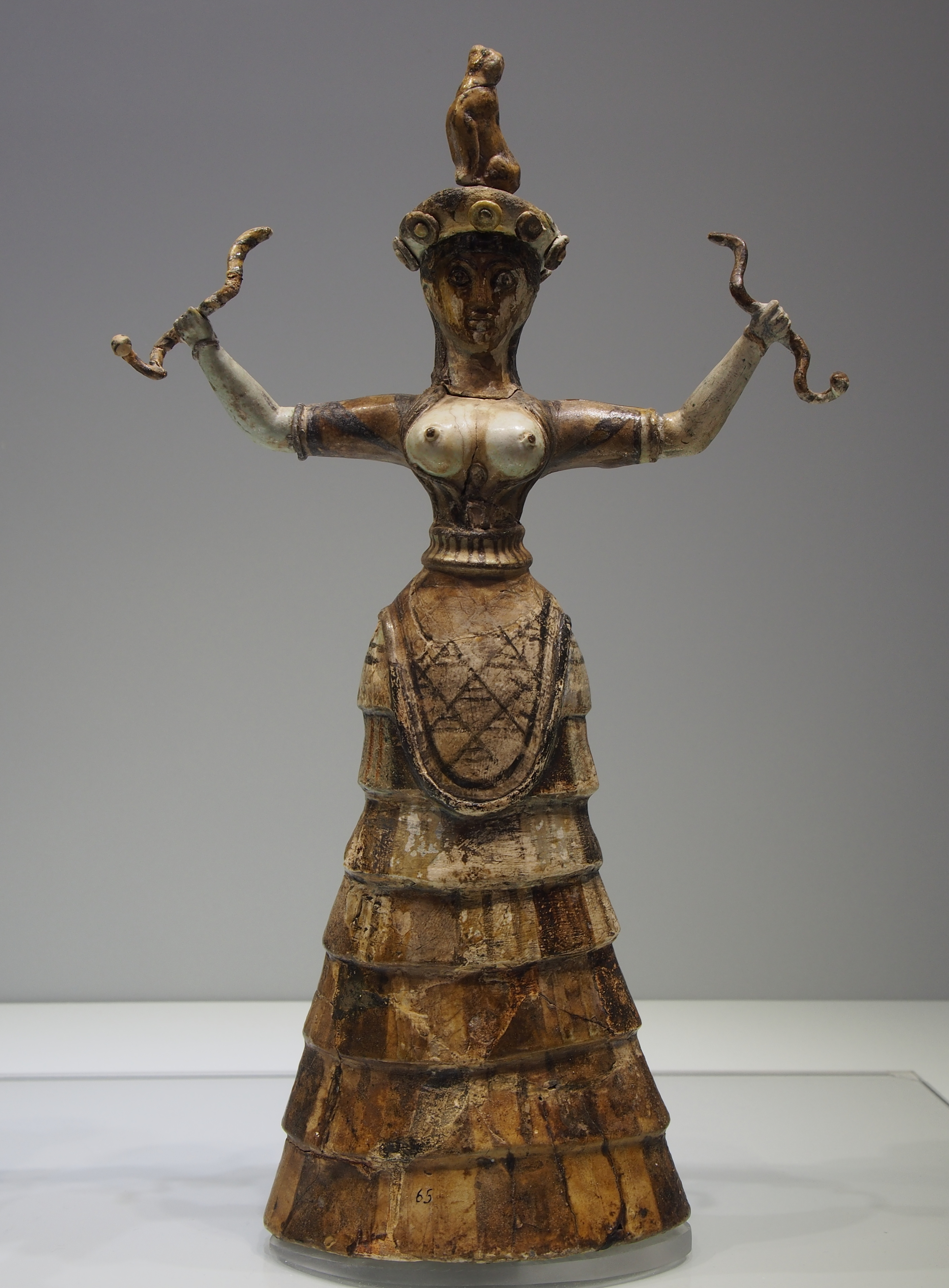
The Snake Goddess figurine; a goddess or priestess (MM III)

Covers findings from 1700 BCE to 1450 BCE, including:

- Bull's head rhyton from Knossos
- Snake goddess figurines
- Tools and weapons, mostly cast in bronze
- Cups with Linear A inscriptions

=== Room V ===
Covers findings from 1450 BCE to 1400 BCE, including:

- Ancient Egyptian trade objects
- Clay model of a house
- Examples of a Linear A and Linear B scripts

=== Room VI ===
Covers findings from cemeteries at Knossos, Phaistos and Archanes, including:

- Clay figurines
- Gold jewellery
- Horse burial from a tholos tomb at Archanes

=== Room VII ===
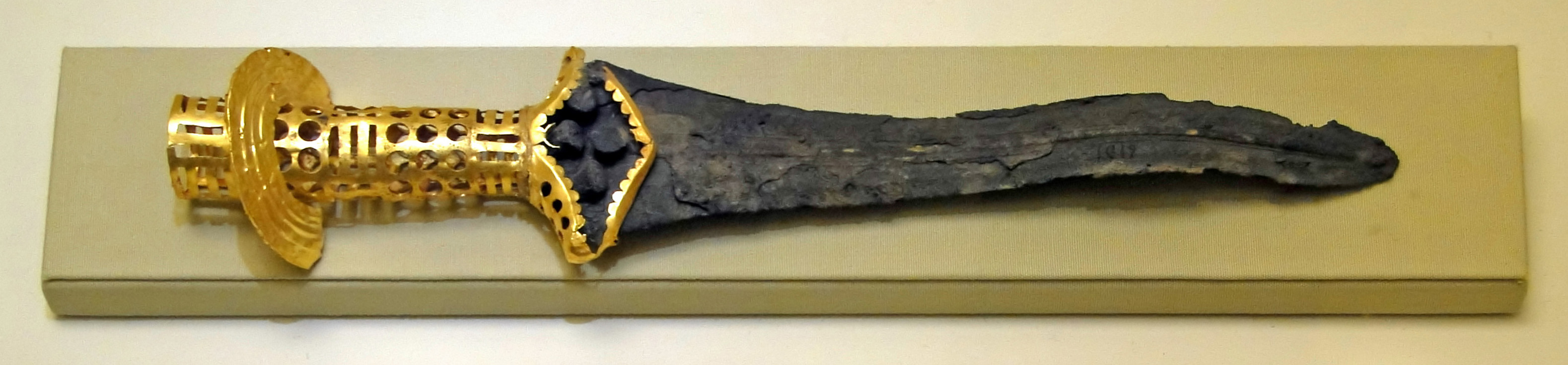
Bronze dagger from Malia

Covers findings from 1700 BCE to 1300 BCE from smaller villas and sacred caves, including:

- Bronze double axes
- The Harvester Vase
- Steatite vases from Hagia Triada
- Gold jewelry from Malia

=== Room VIII – Zakros ===
Covers findings from 1700 BCE to 1450 BCE from the palace of Zakros, including:

- Rock crystal rhyton
- Bull's head rhyton
- Pottery with floral and marine motifs

=== Room IX ===
Covers findings from 1700 BCE to 1450 BCE in eastern Crete, including:

- Terracotta figurines from Pisokephalo peak sanctuary
- Seal stones

=== Room X – Mycenaean ===
Covers findings from 1400 BCE to 1100 BCE, including:

- Clay figurines
- Clay sculpture of dancers with a lyre player

=== Room XI – Dorian ===
Covers findings from 1100 BCE to 900 BCE during the arrival of the Dorian Greeks, including:

- Weapons and tools, mostly of iron
- Clay fertility figurines
- Votive offerings

=== Room XII ===
Covers findings up to 650 BCE, including:

- Pottery decorated with griffins
- Artefacts and figurines from Kato Syme

=== Room XIII – Larnakes ===
Minoan larnakes (clay coffins) are on display here.

=== Room XIV – Hall of the Frescoes ===
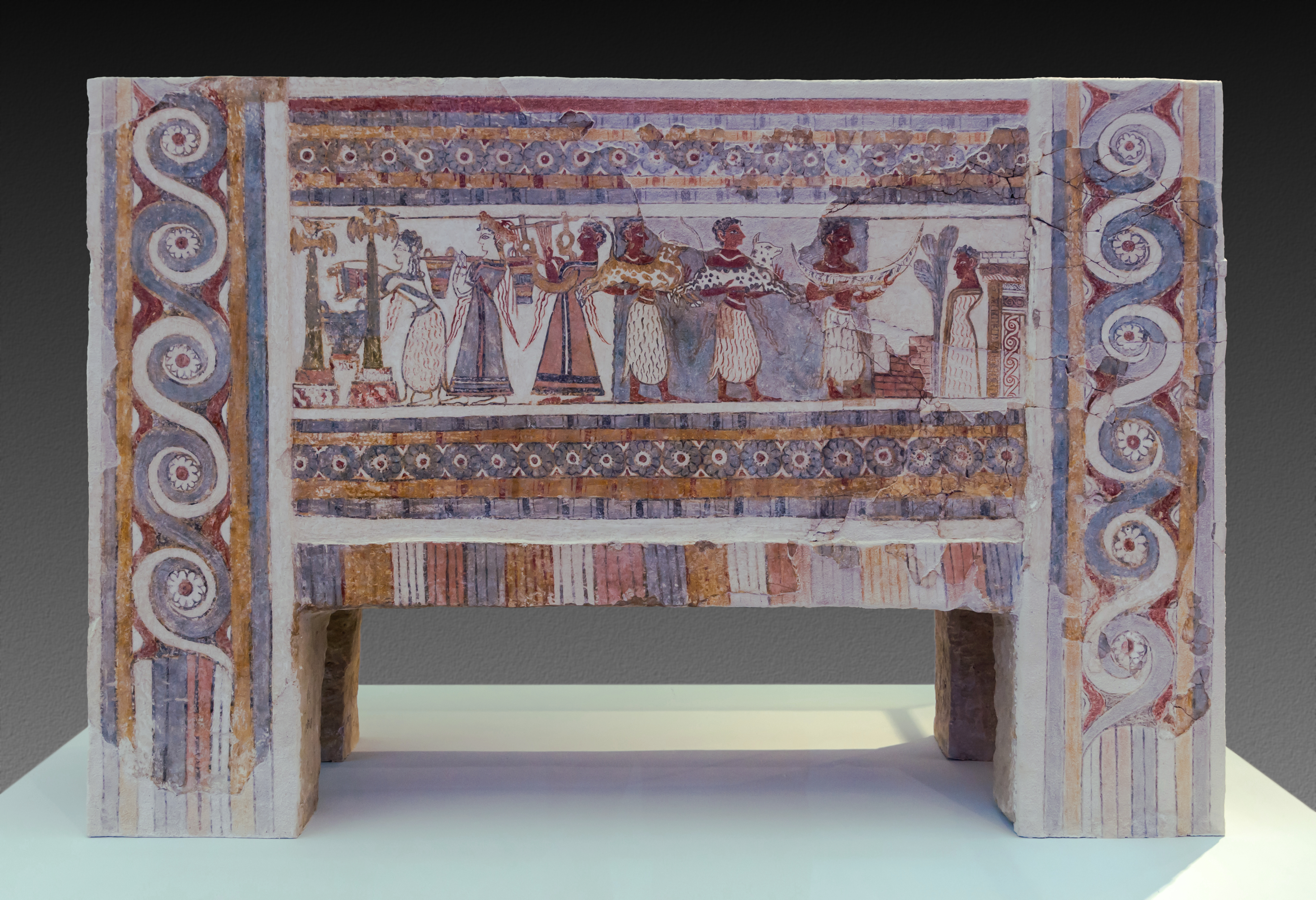
The Hagia Triada sarcophagus

- Frescoes from Knossos and Hagia Triada
- The Hagia Triada sarcophagus

=== Room XV & Room XVI ===
- More frescoes, including the famous "La Parisienne"

=== Room XX – Classical Greek, Greco-Roman ===
Sculptures from Classical Greek and Greco-Roman periods

== Visitor information ==
During the summer season (May–October), the museum is open 08:00–20:00 every weekday besides Wednesday, on which it is open 13:00–20:00. During the winter season (November–March) and April, the museum is open 08:30–15:30 every weekday besides Wednesday, on which it is only open 10:00–17:00. The museum is also only open limited hours on certain holidays.

The price for admission is typically 20€. However, there are days of free admission, such as the first and third Sunday of the month during the winter season (November–March) and several holidays. Persons with disabilities and one escort are also allowed free entry. Greek citizens and EU citizens over 65 receive discount admission of 12€ during the winter season.

There is air conditioning within the building.

Some of the collection cannot be photographed due to publication or another reason. There are usually signs posted nearby the restricted items.

== Notable artifacts ==
- Snake Goddess
- Phaistos Disc
- Arkalochori Axe
- Malia Pendant
- Hymn to Dictaean Zeus stele

== Gallery ==
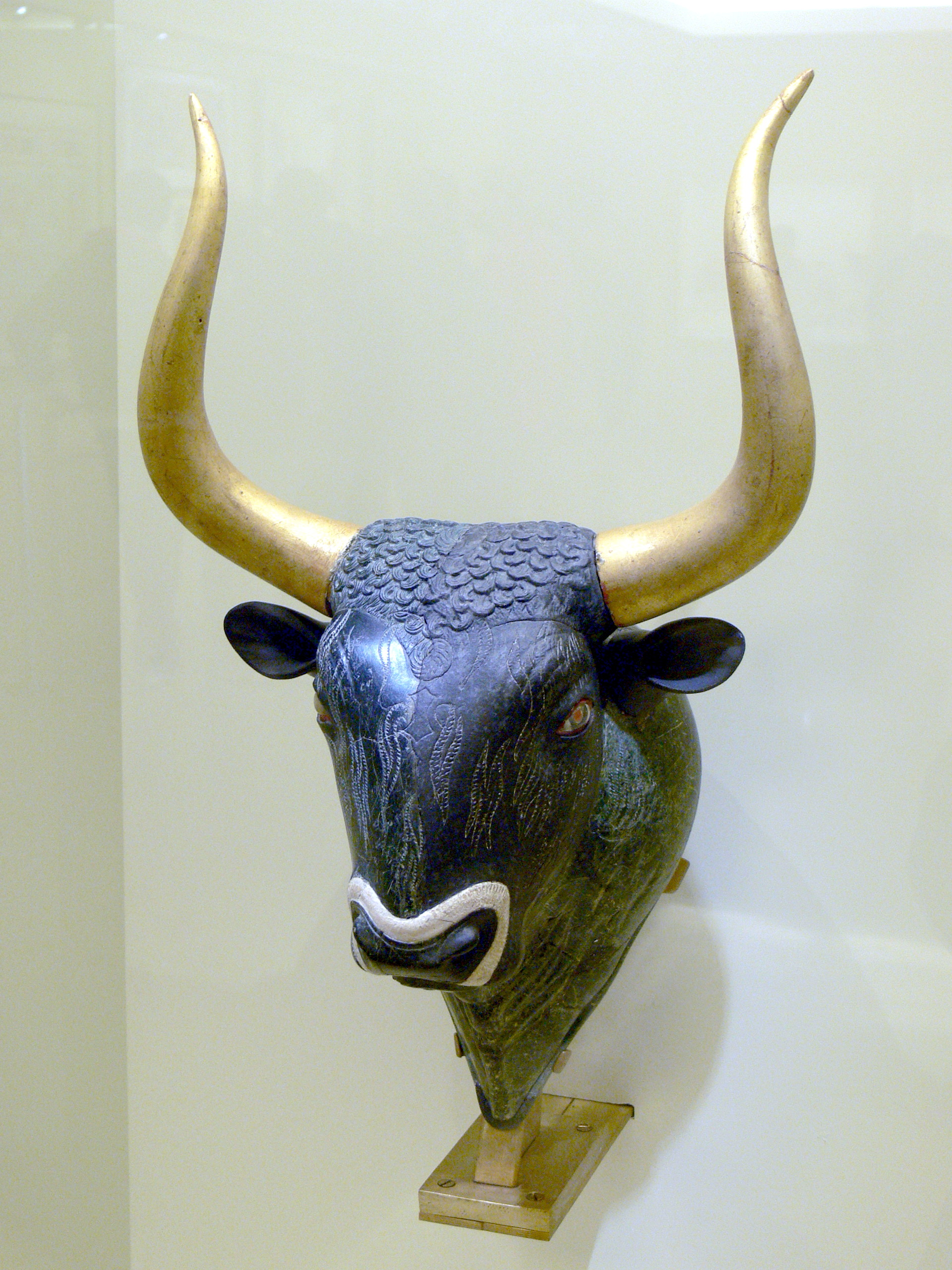
Minoan rhyton in form of a bull

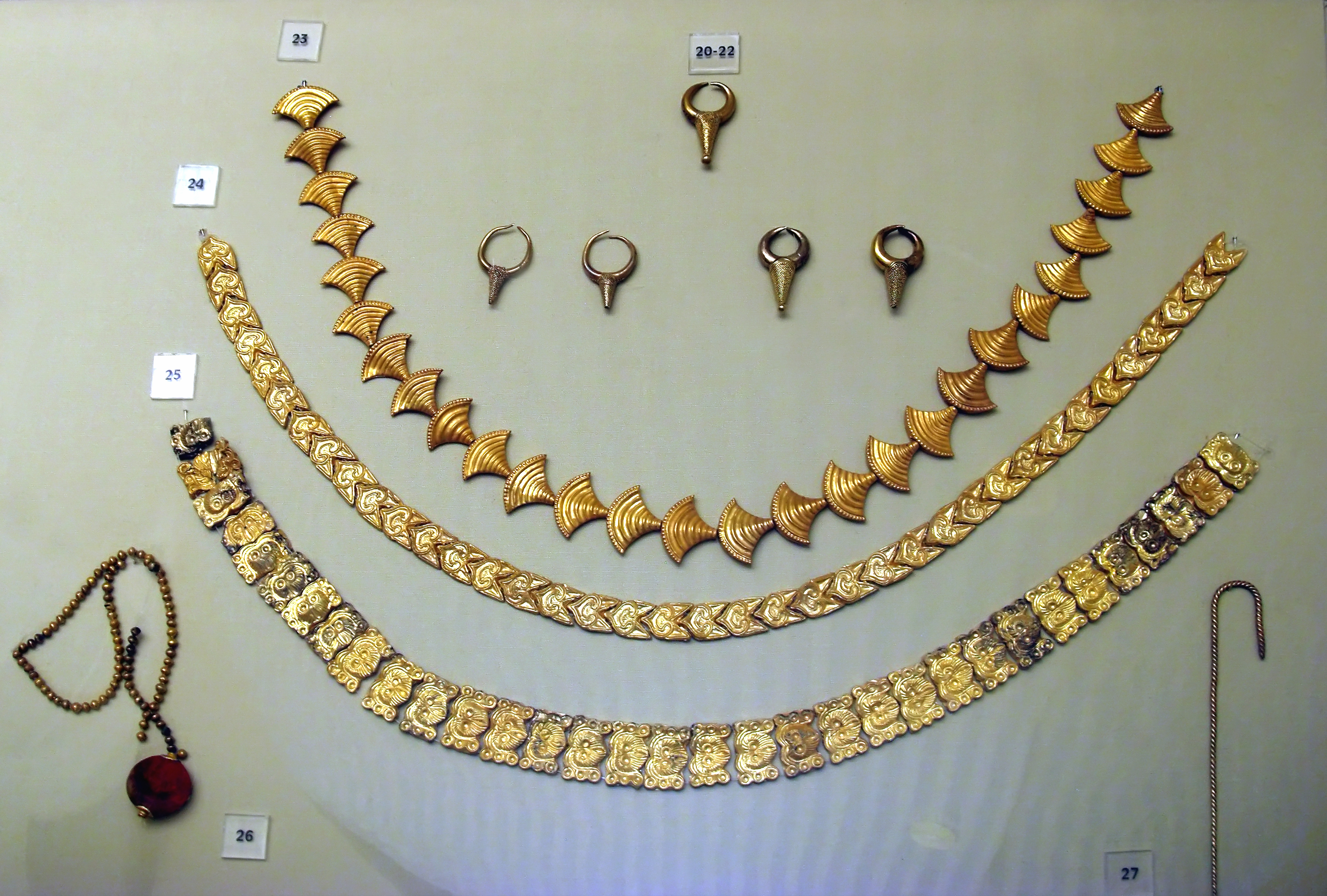
Minoan jewelry

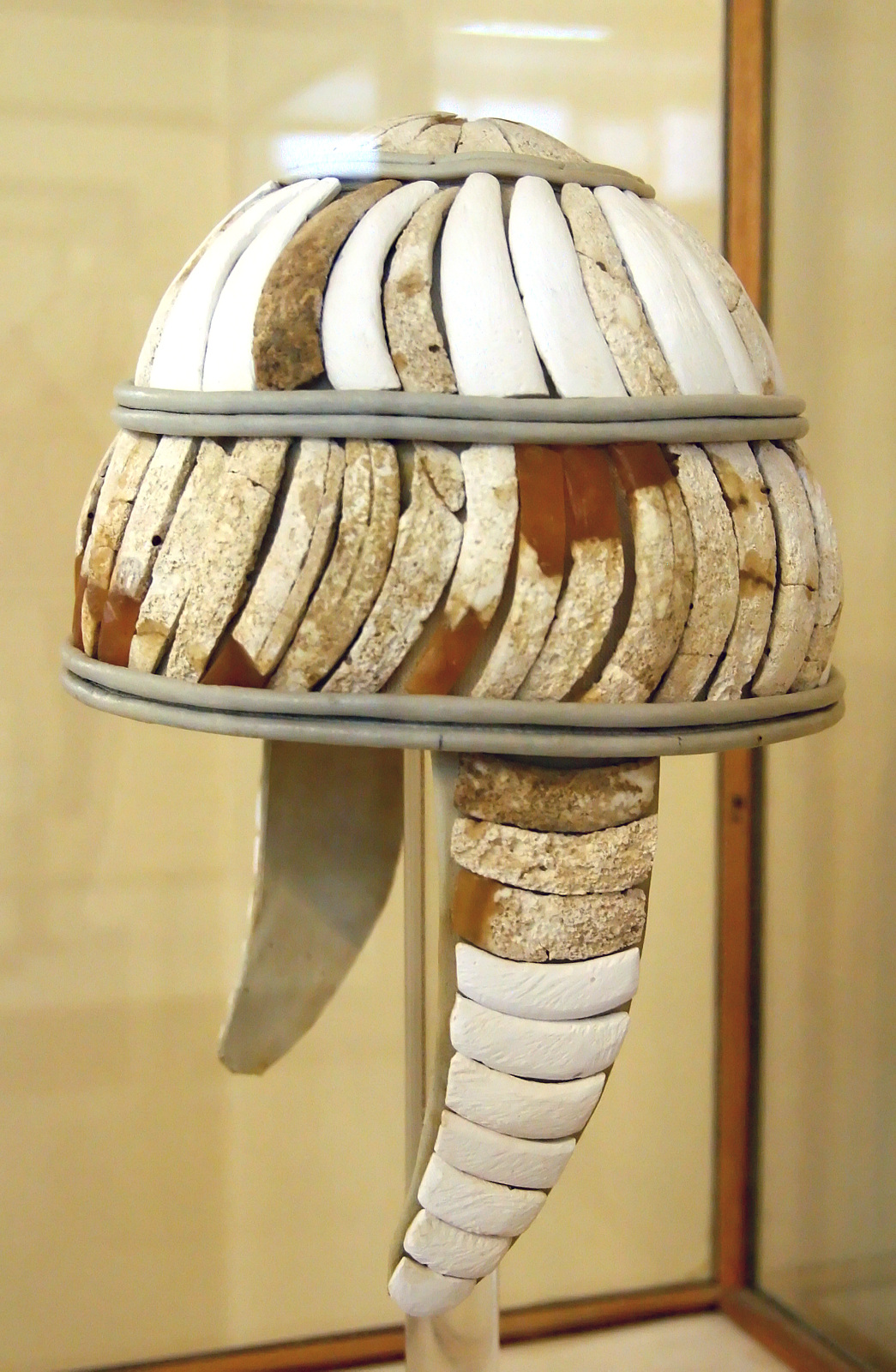
Boar tusk helmet

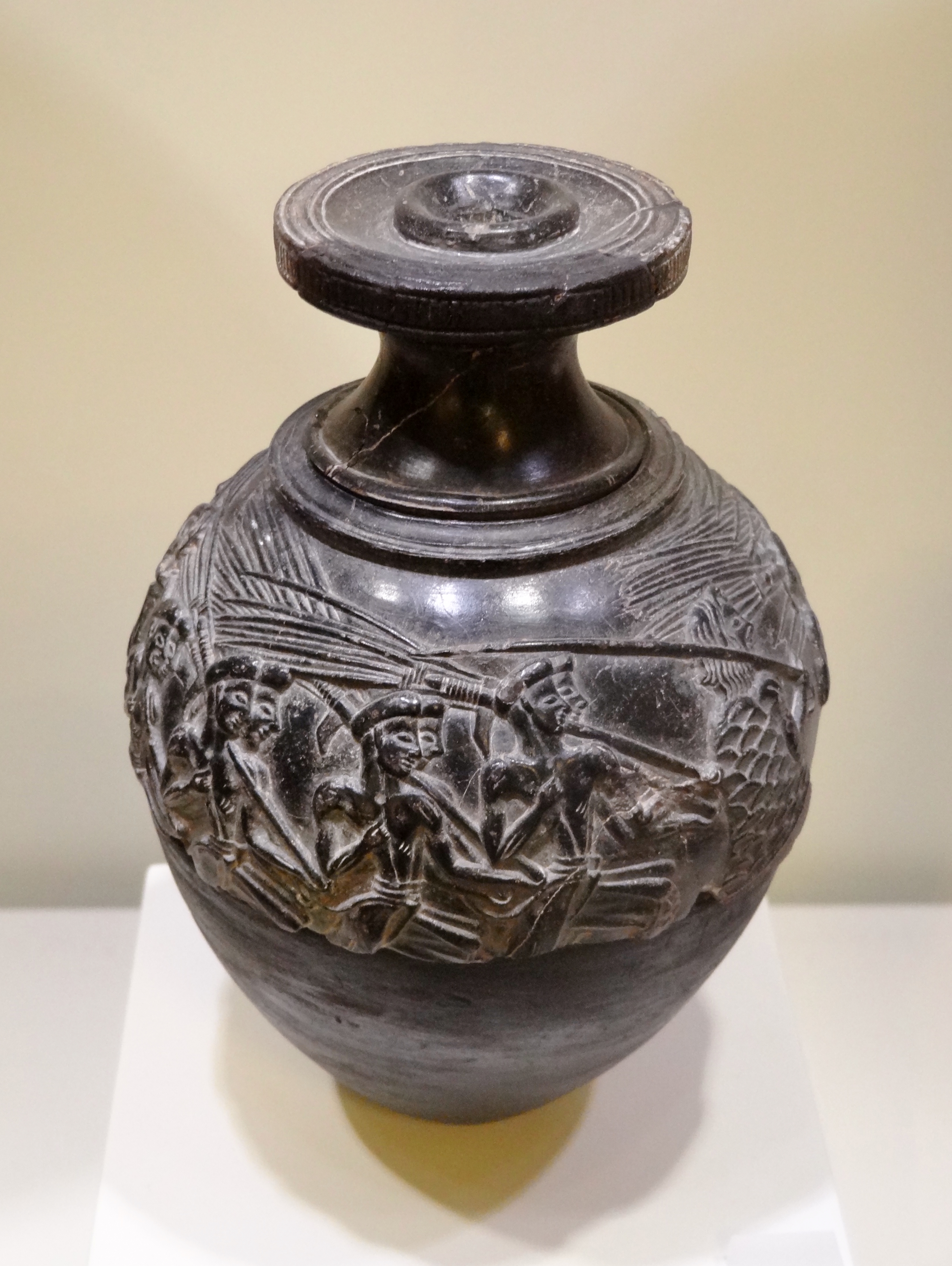
Harvester Vase

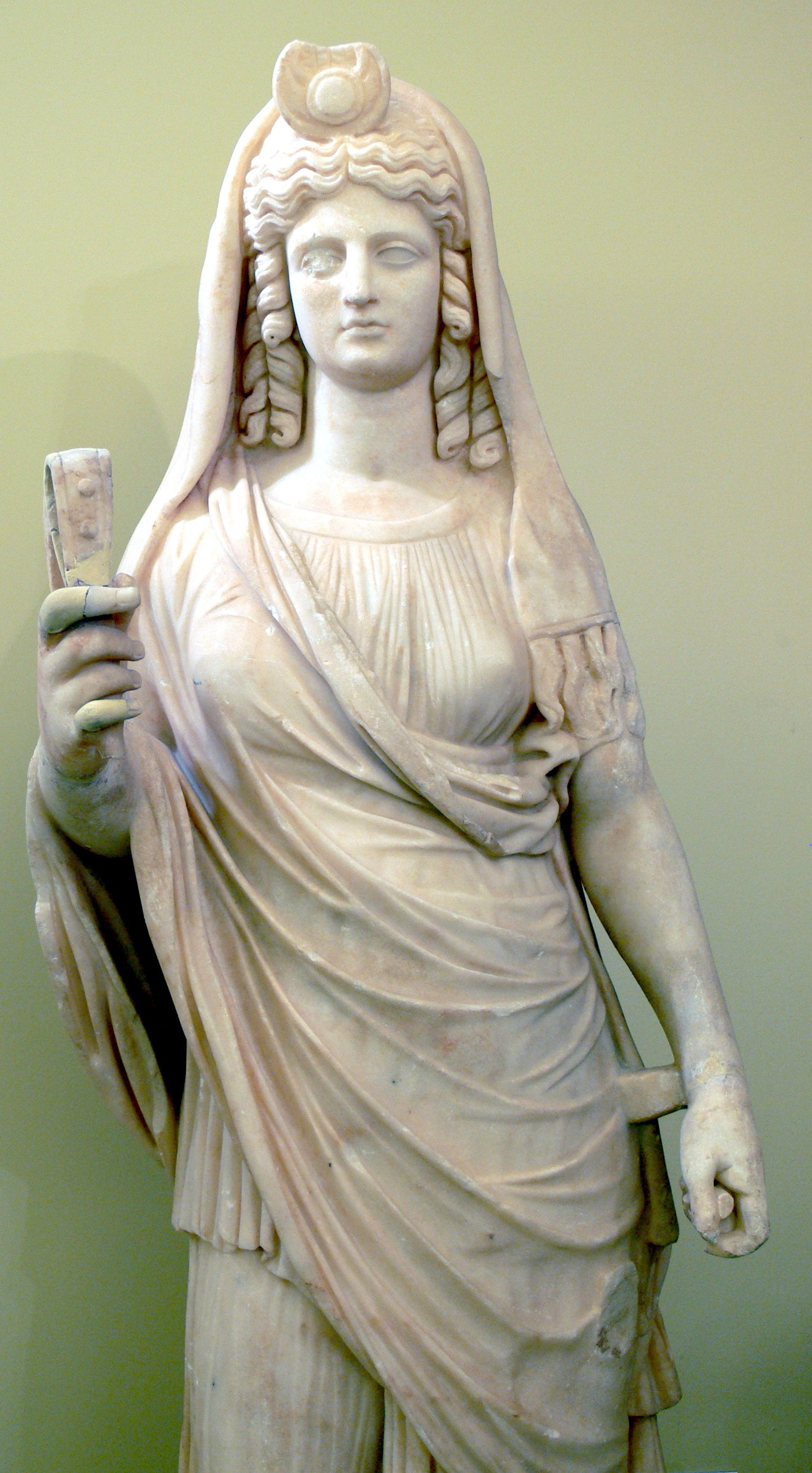
Statue of Isis-Persephone holding a sistrum

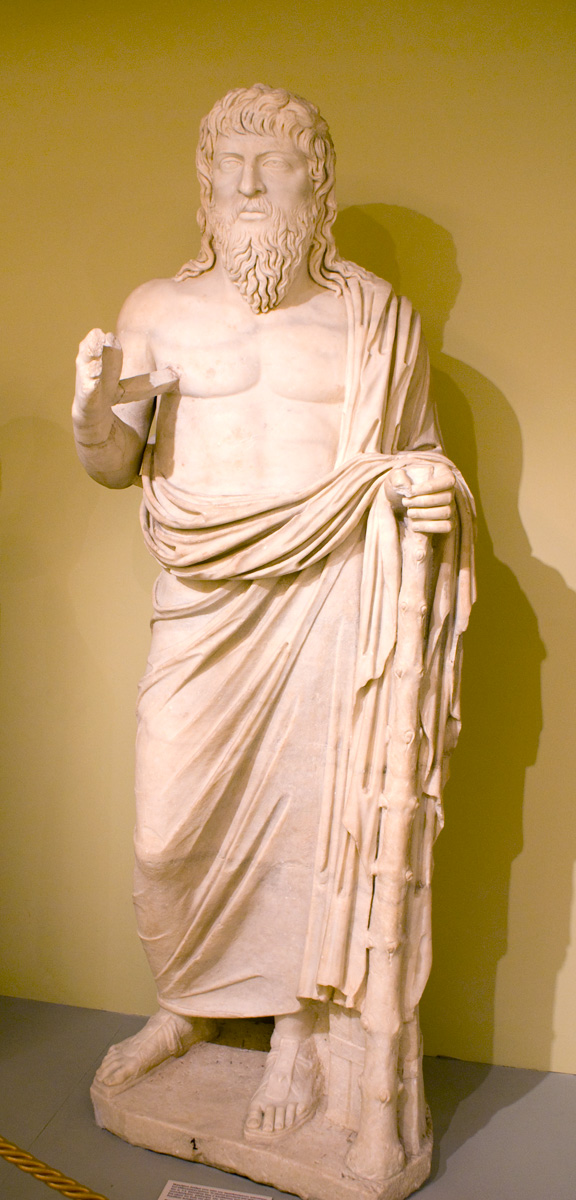
A wandering philosopher, commonly associated with Apollonius of Tyana

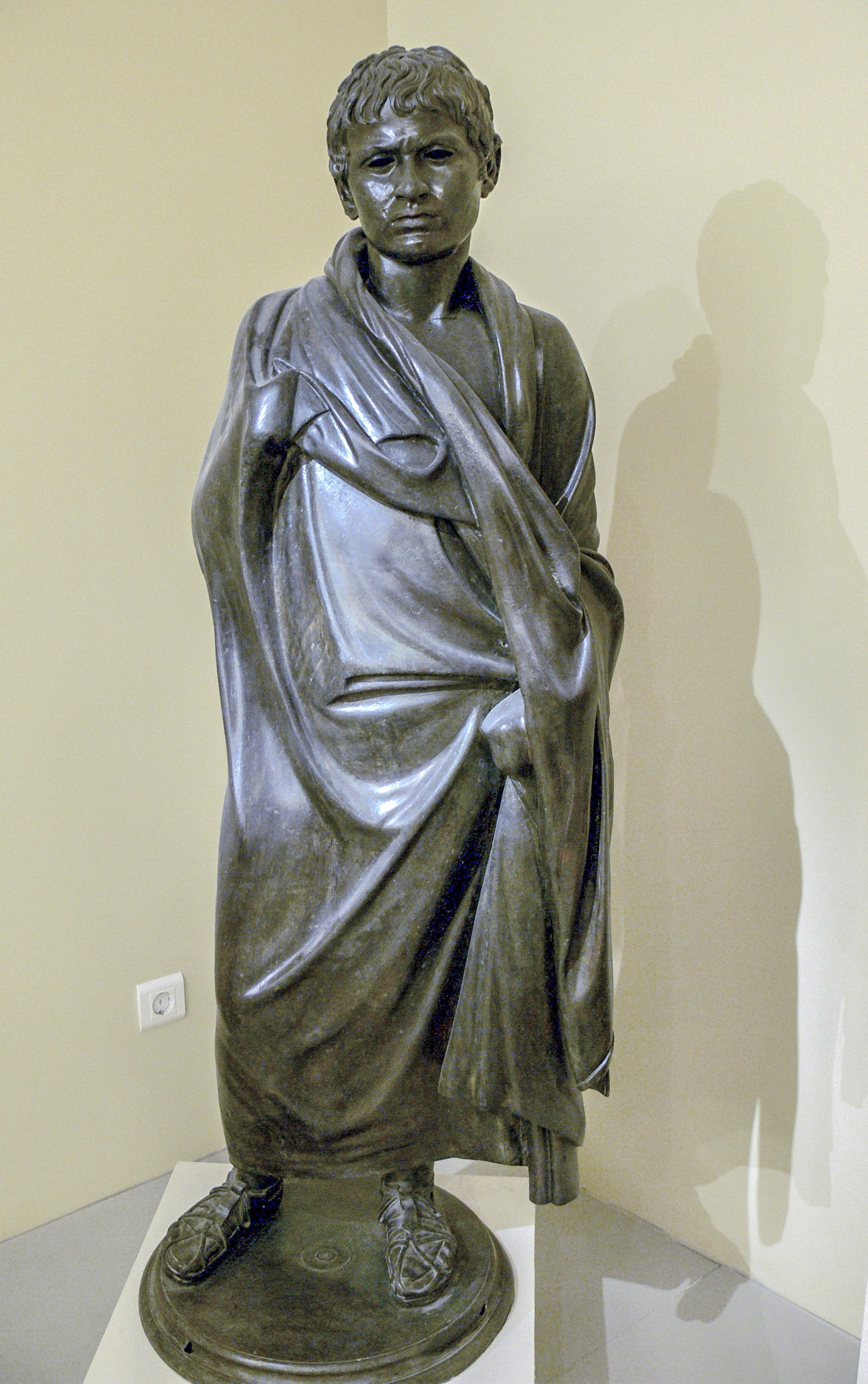
Bronze portrait statue of a youth found in Ierapetra

== Frescos ==
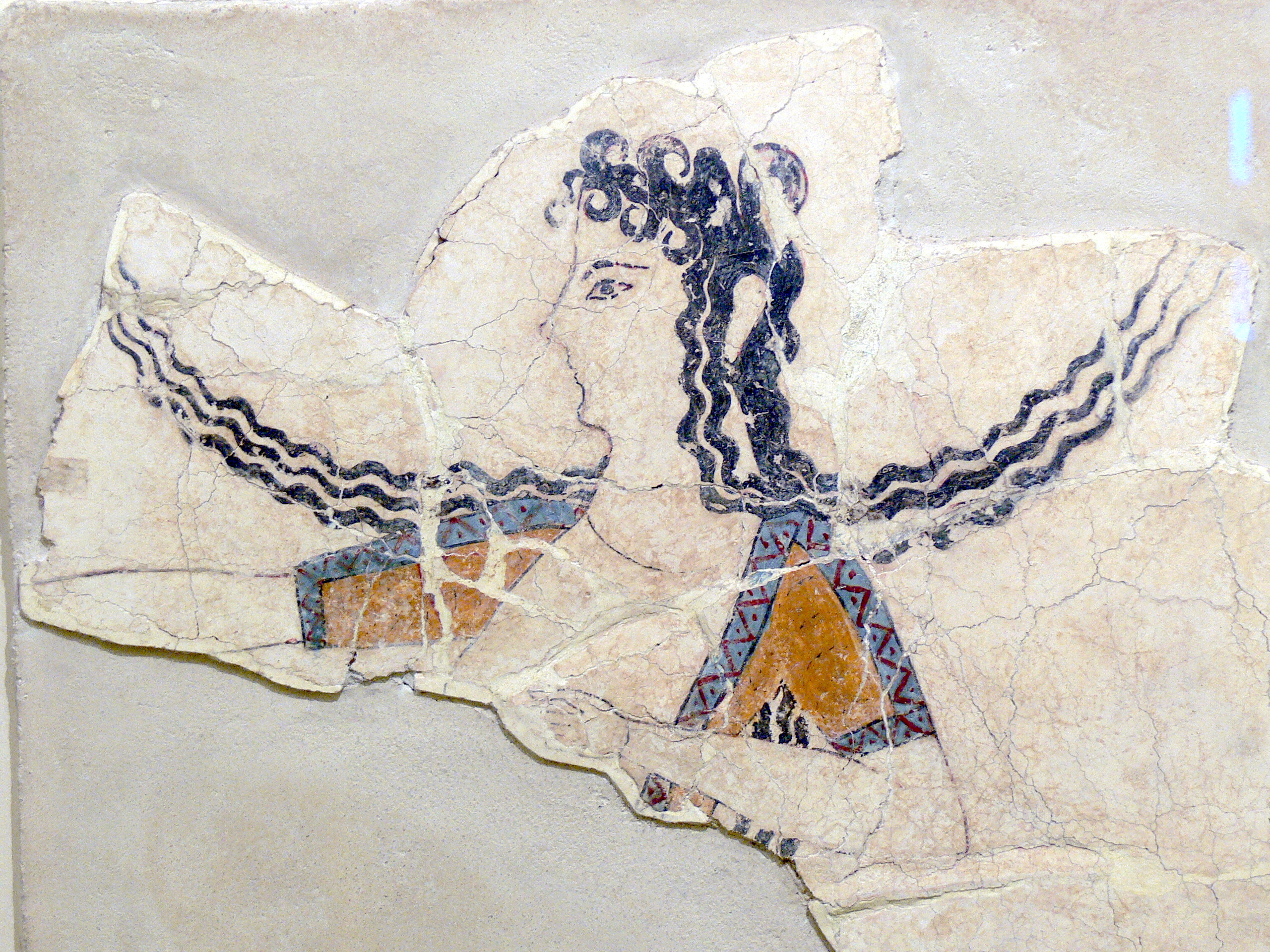
Fresco fragment of a dancing woman (Knossos, 1600-1450 BC)

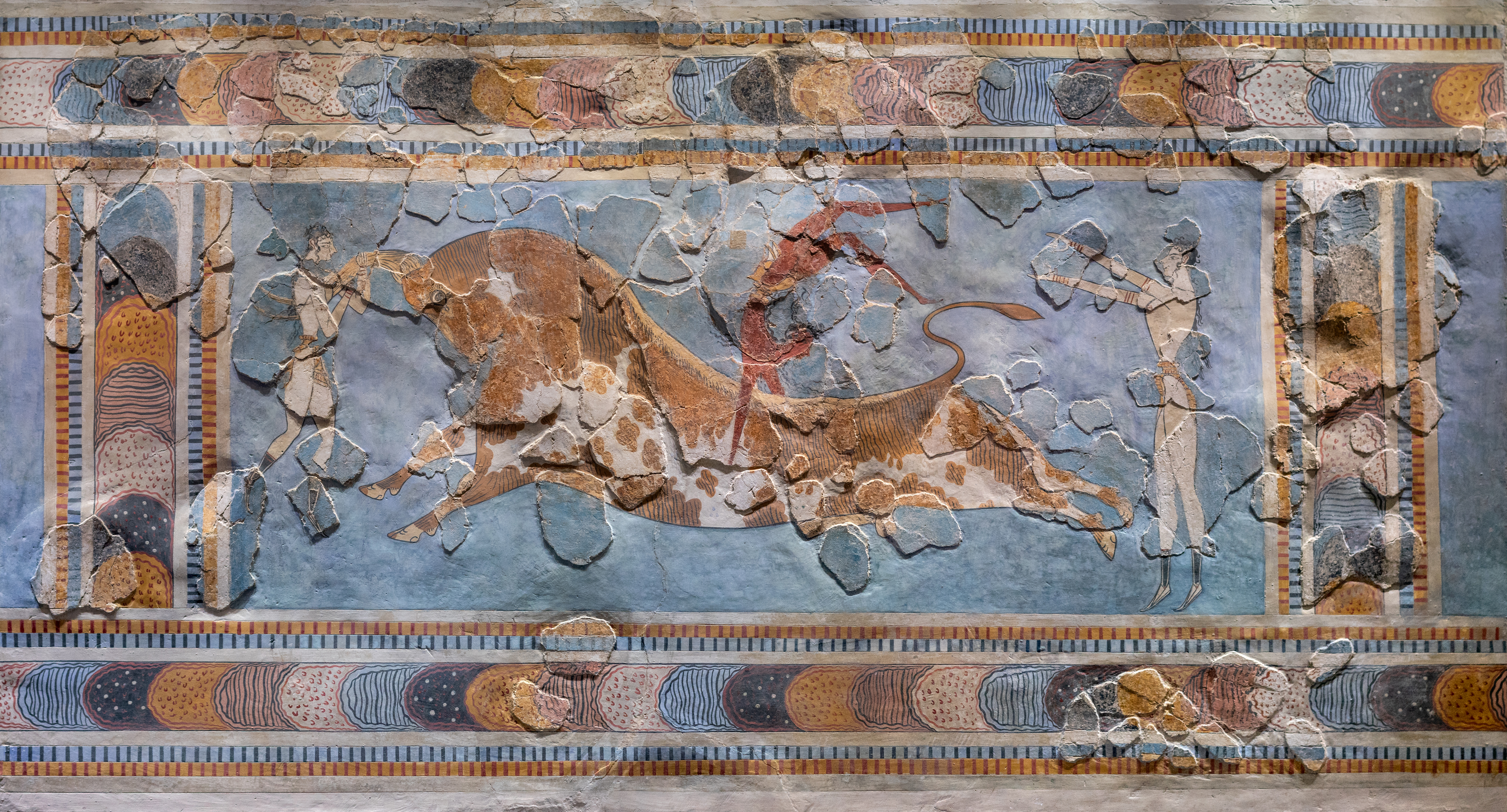
Bull leaping fresco(1600-1450 BC) from Knossos palace, acrobats leaping across a bull

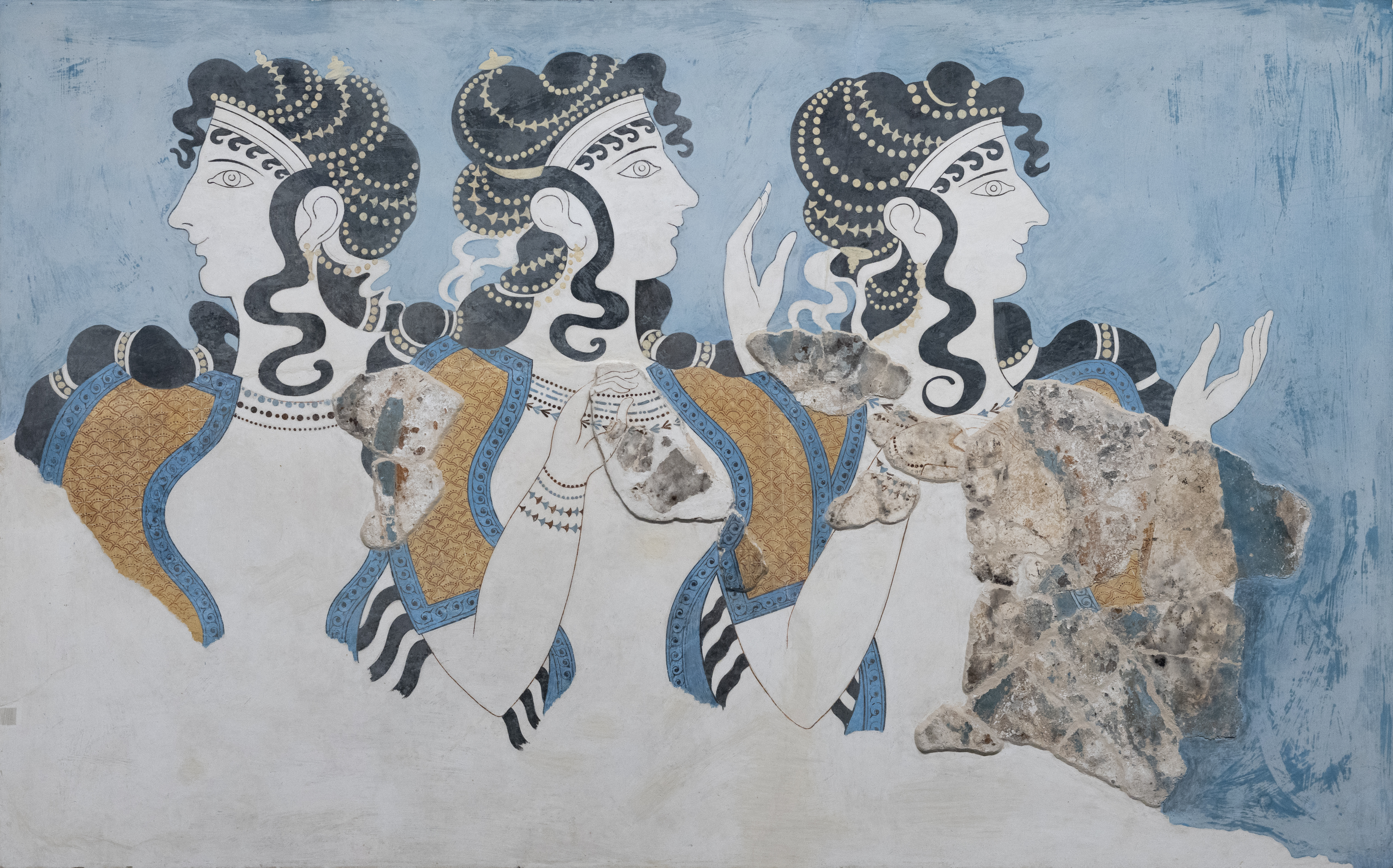
Ladies in Blue fresco

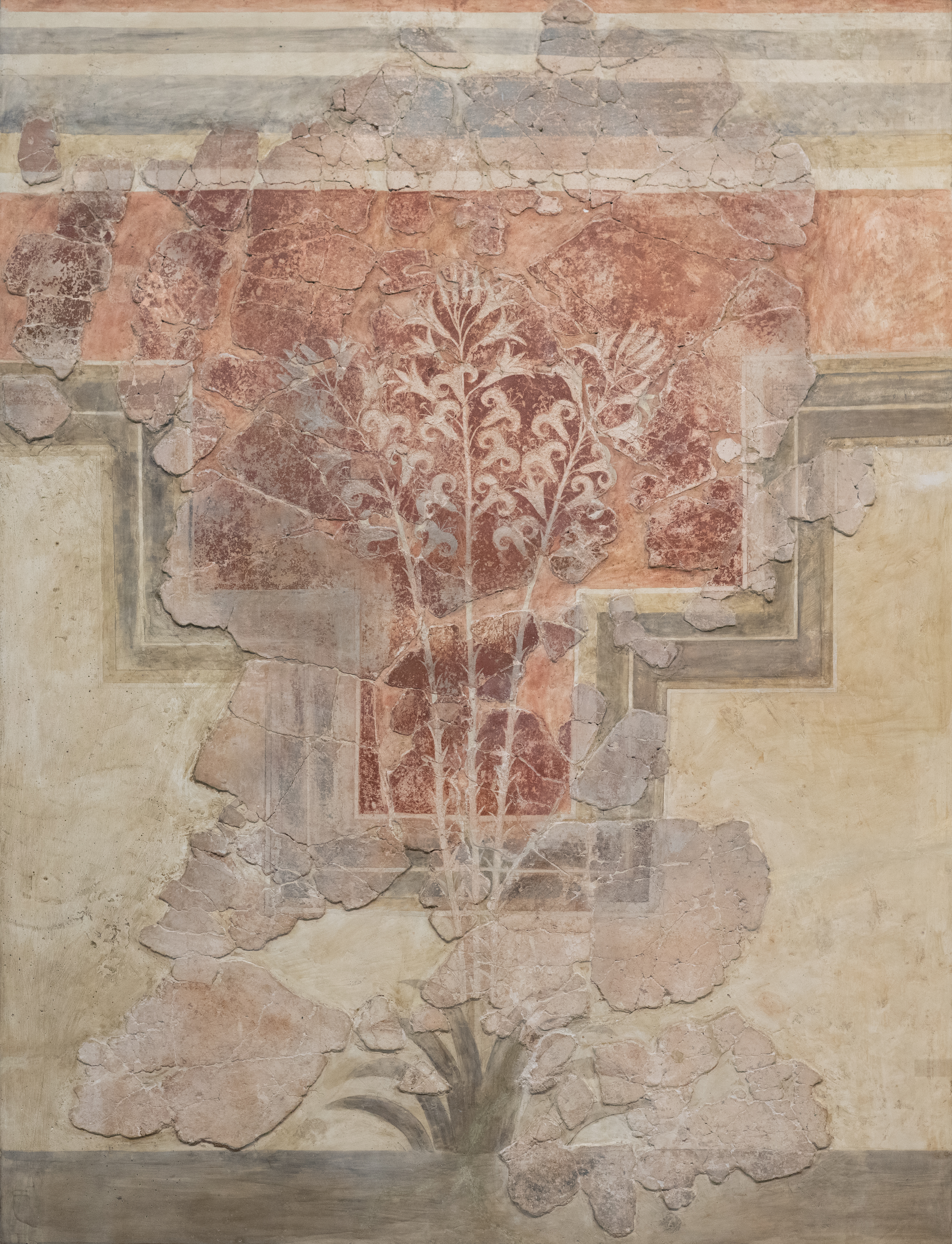
Lily fresco

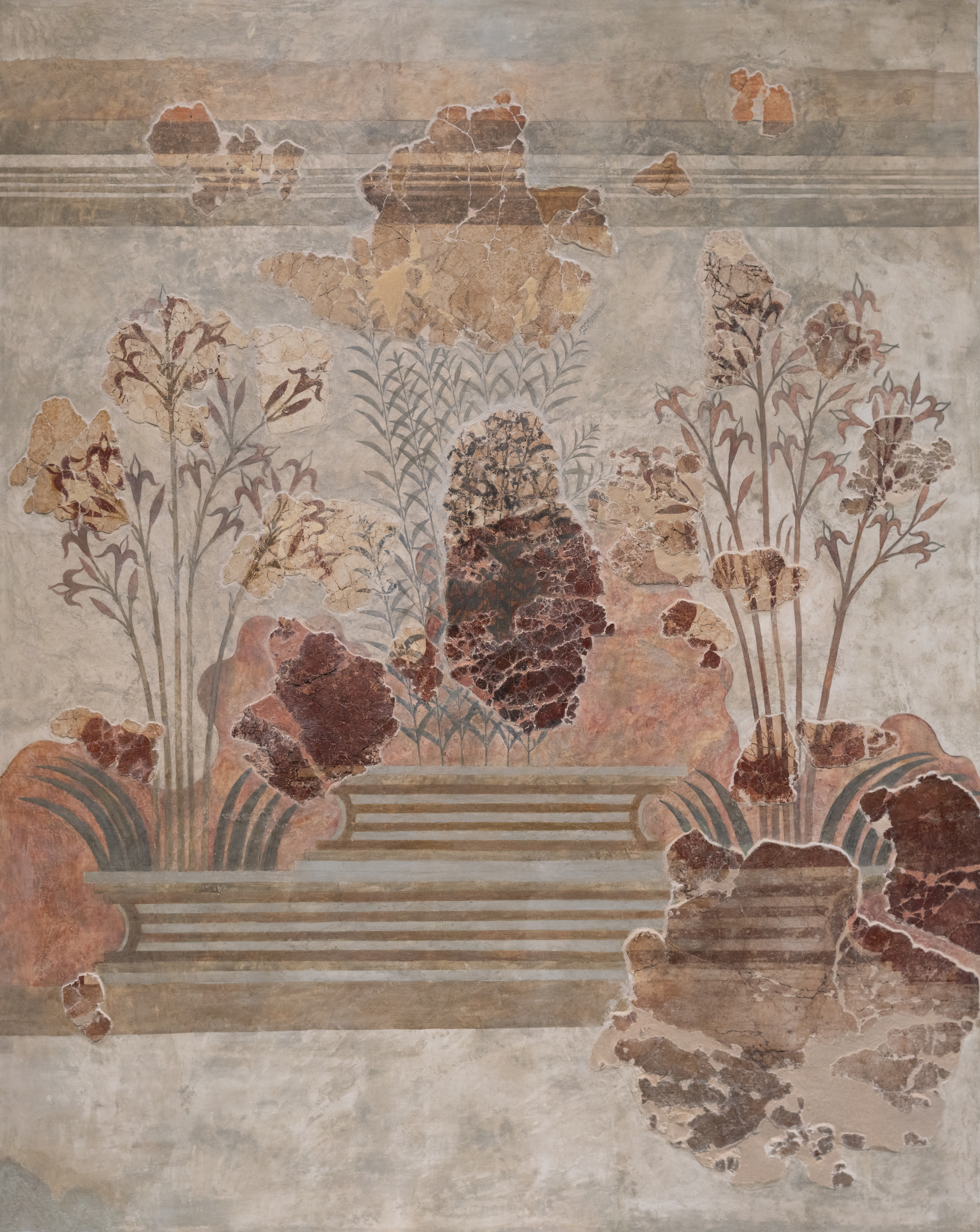
Lily fresco

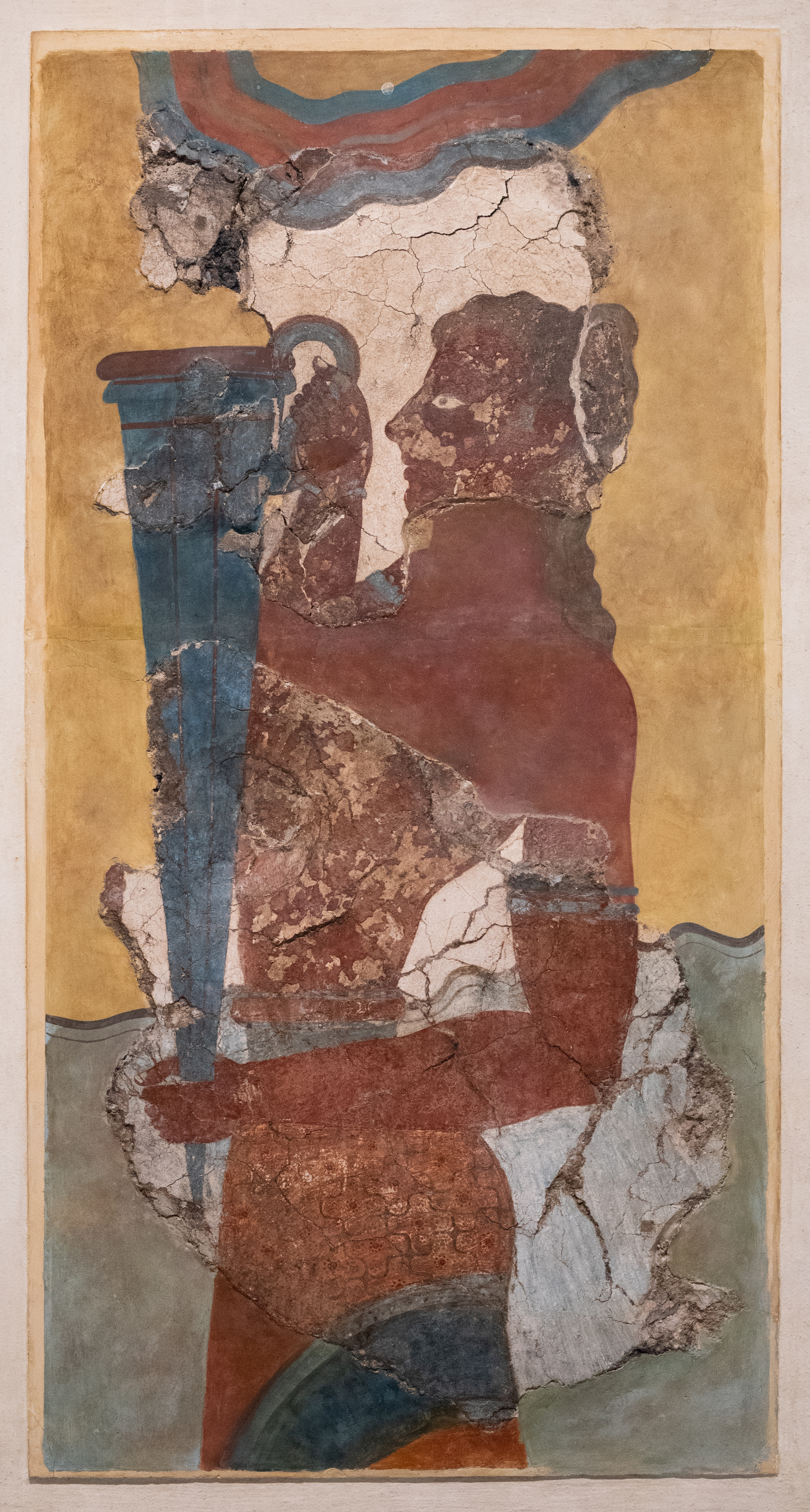
Cup bearer fresco

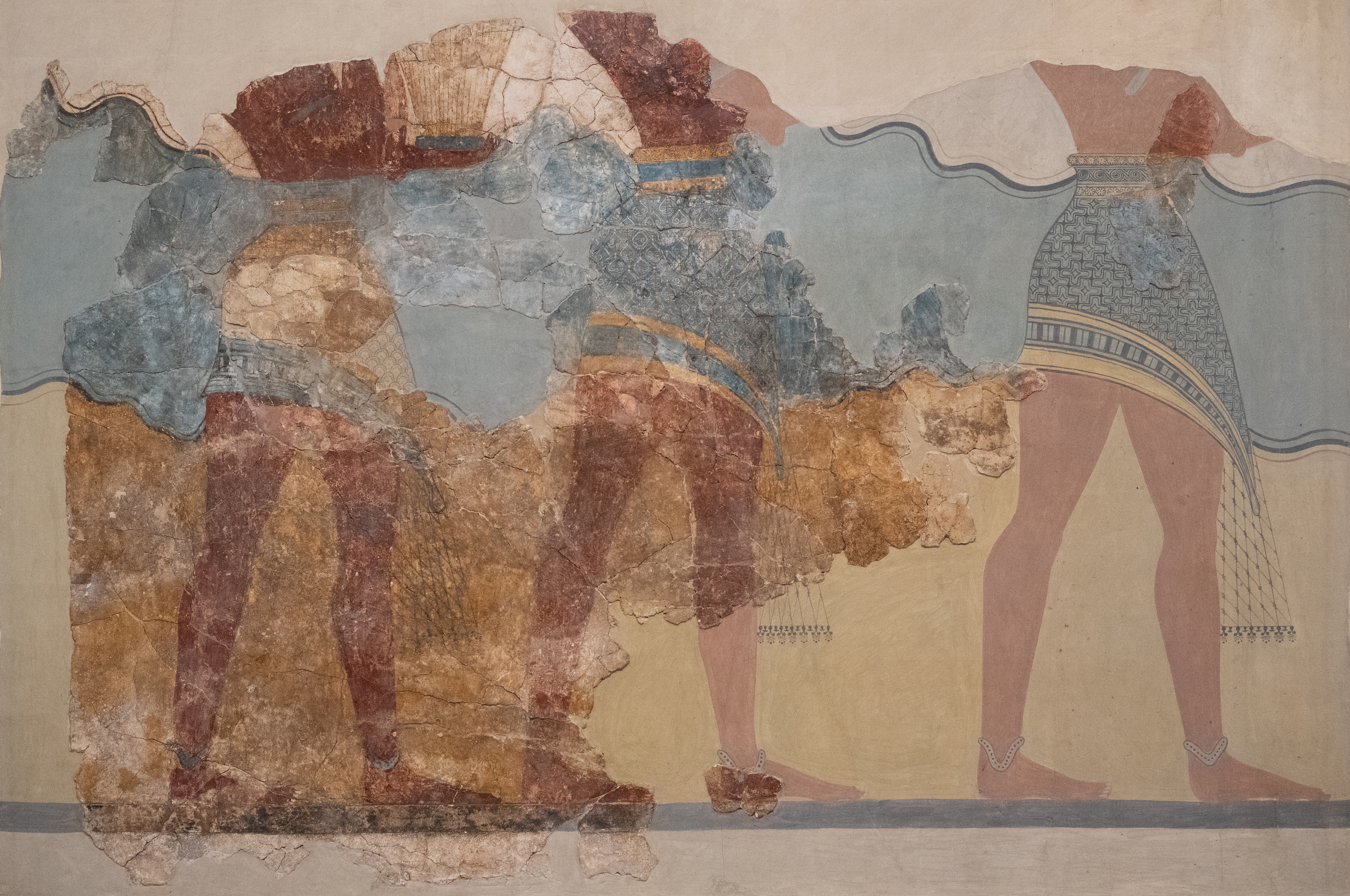
Procession fresco

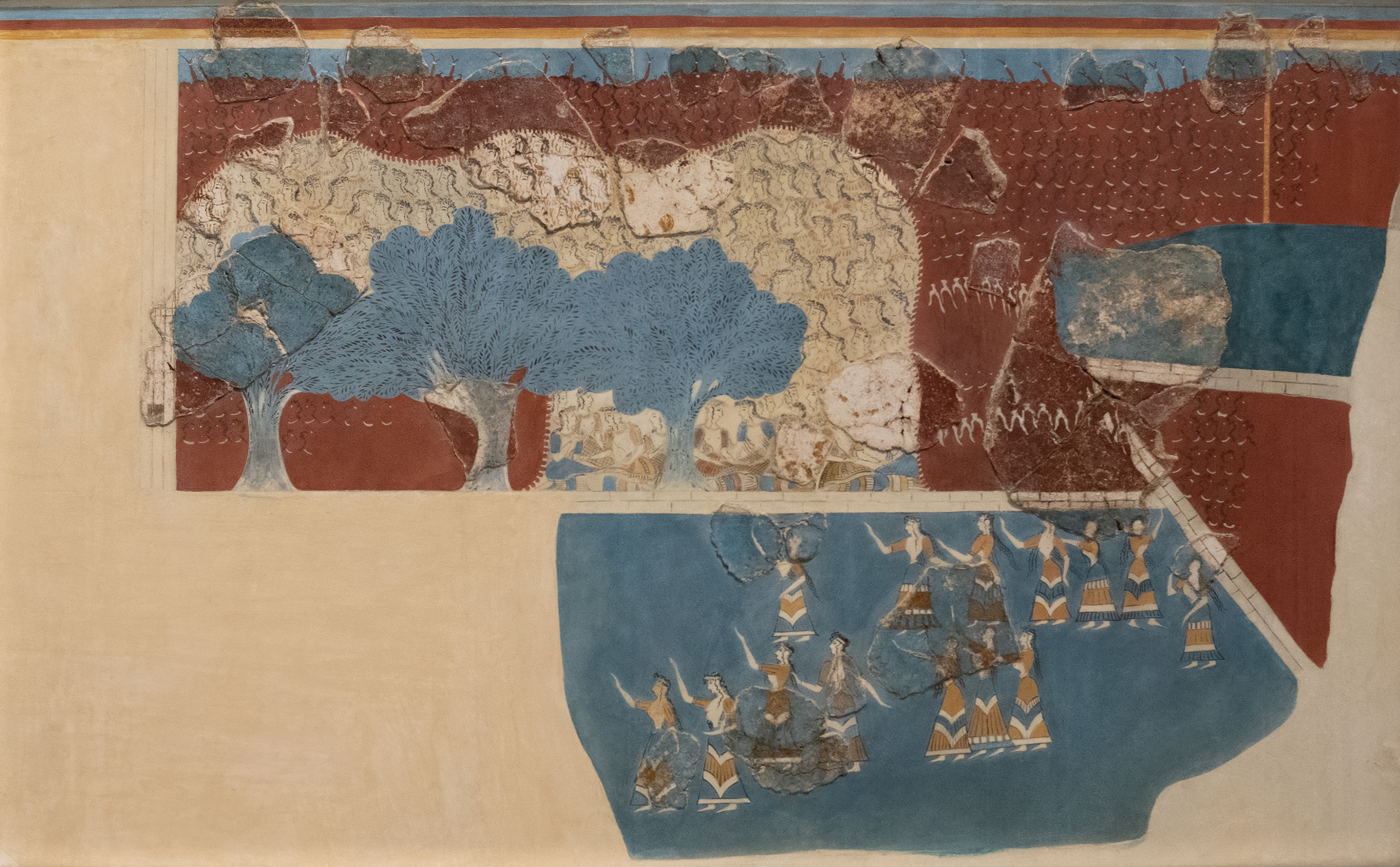
Sacred grove fresco

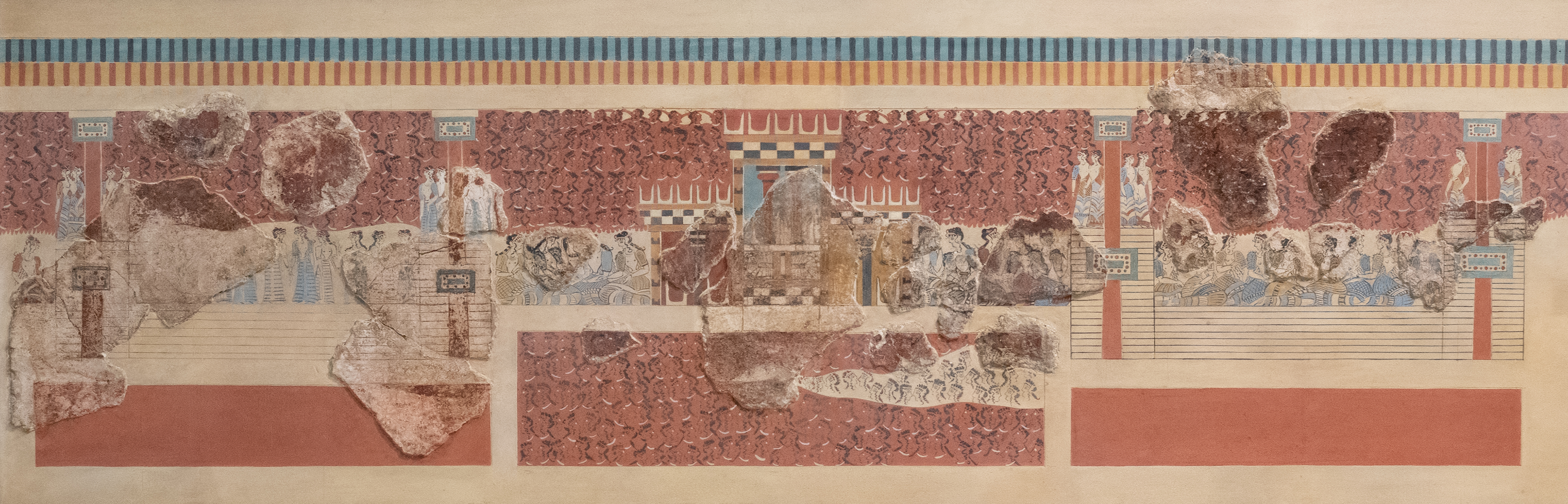
Grandstand fresco

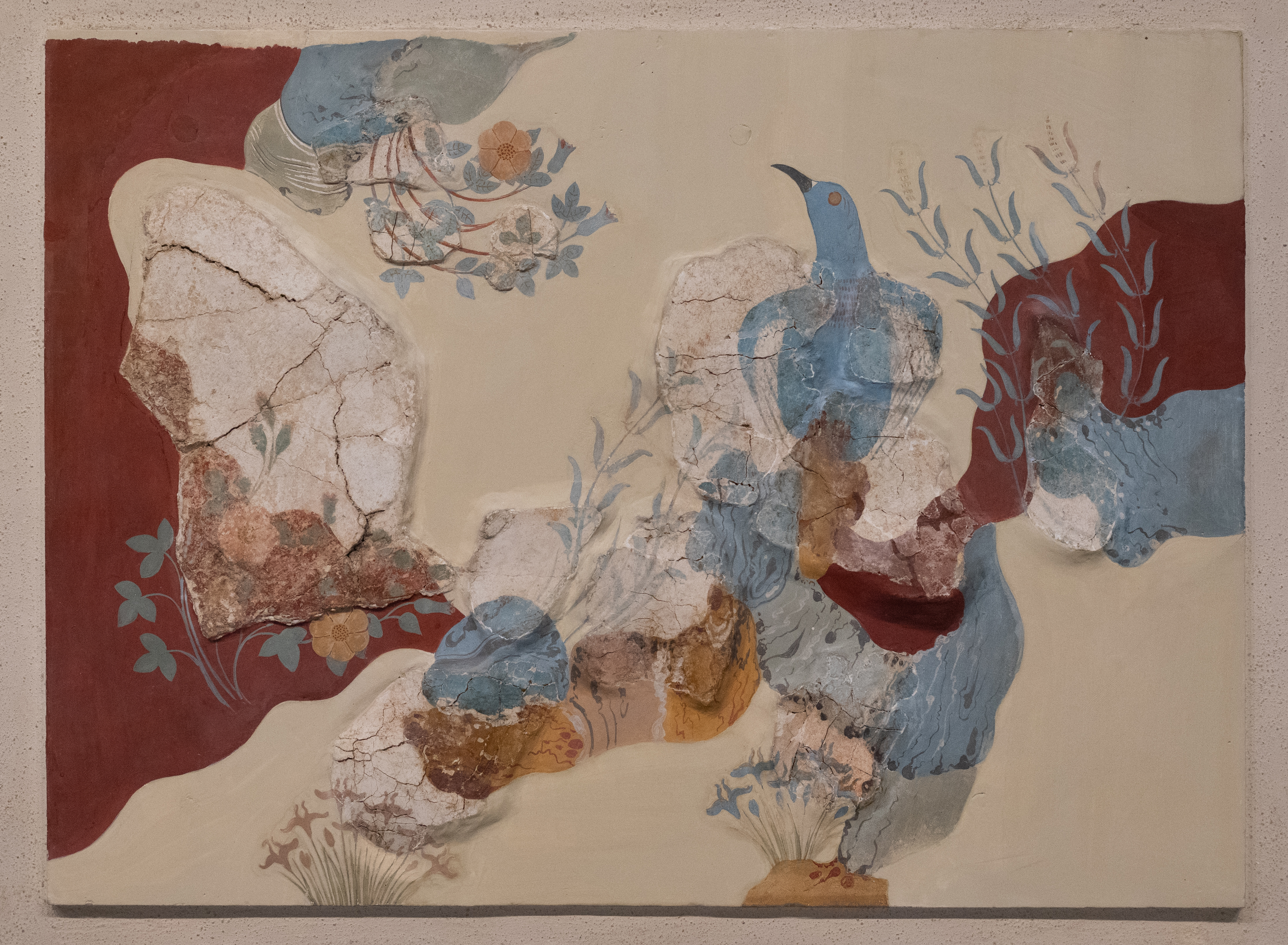
Blue birds fresco

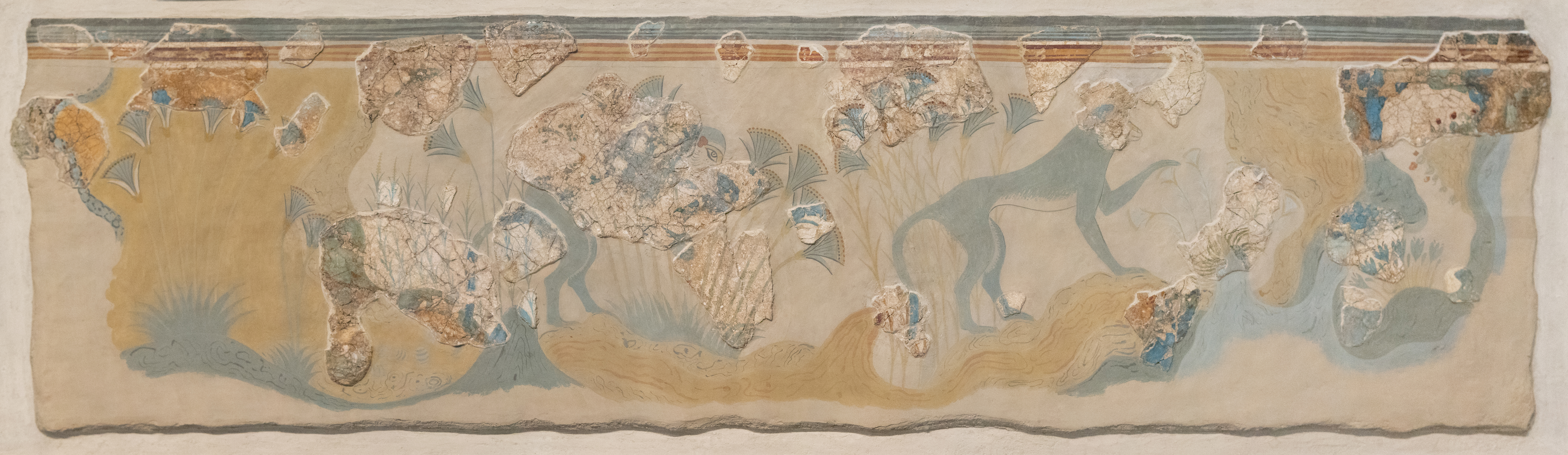
Blue monkeys fresco

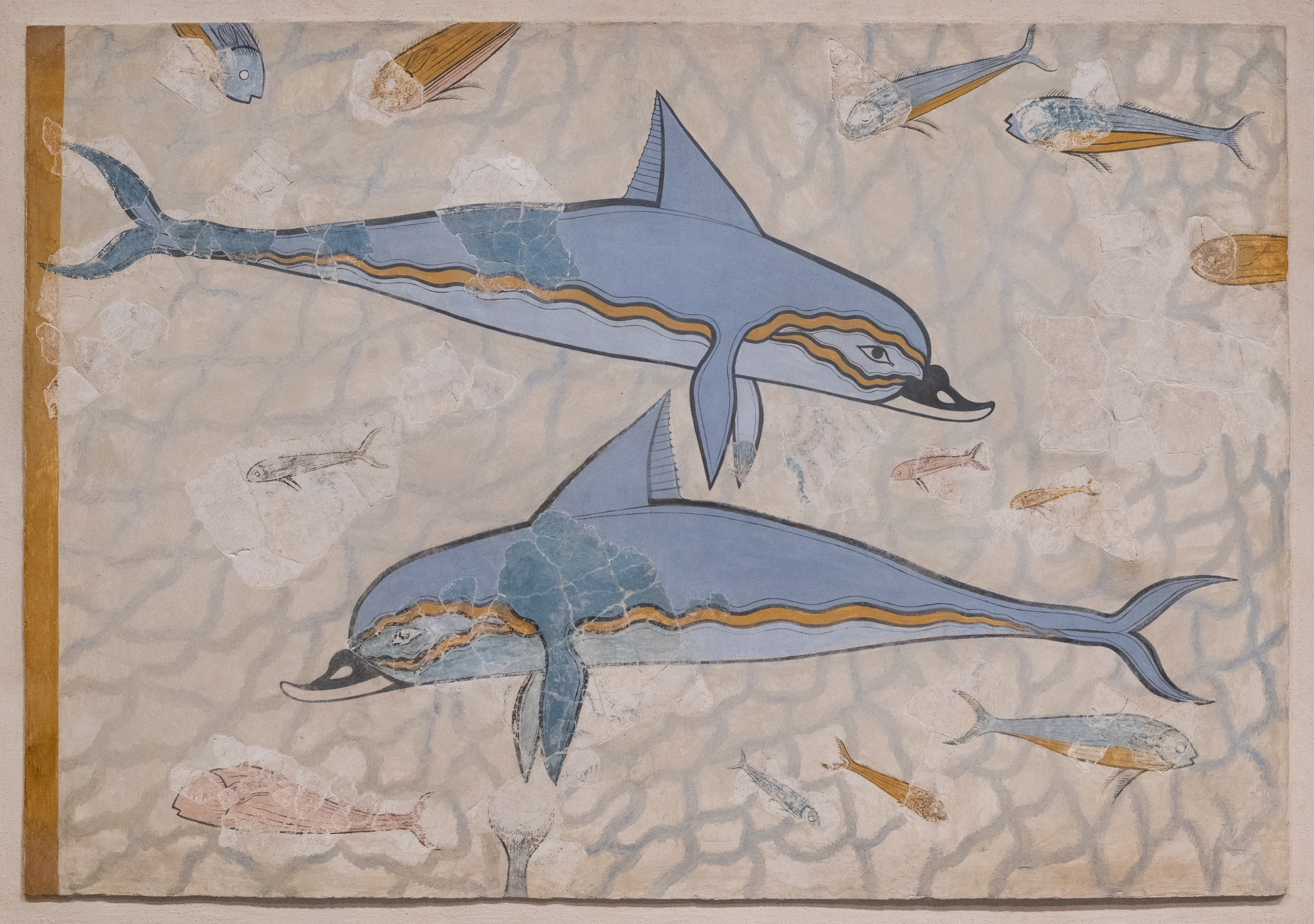
Dolphin fresco

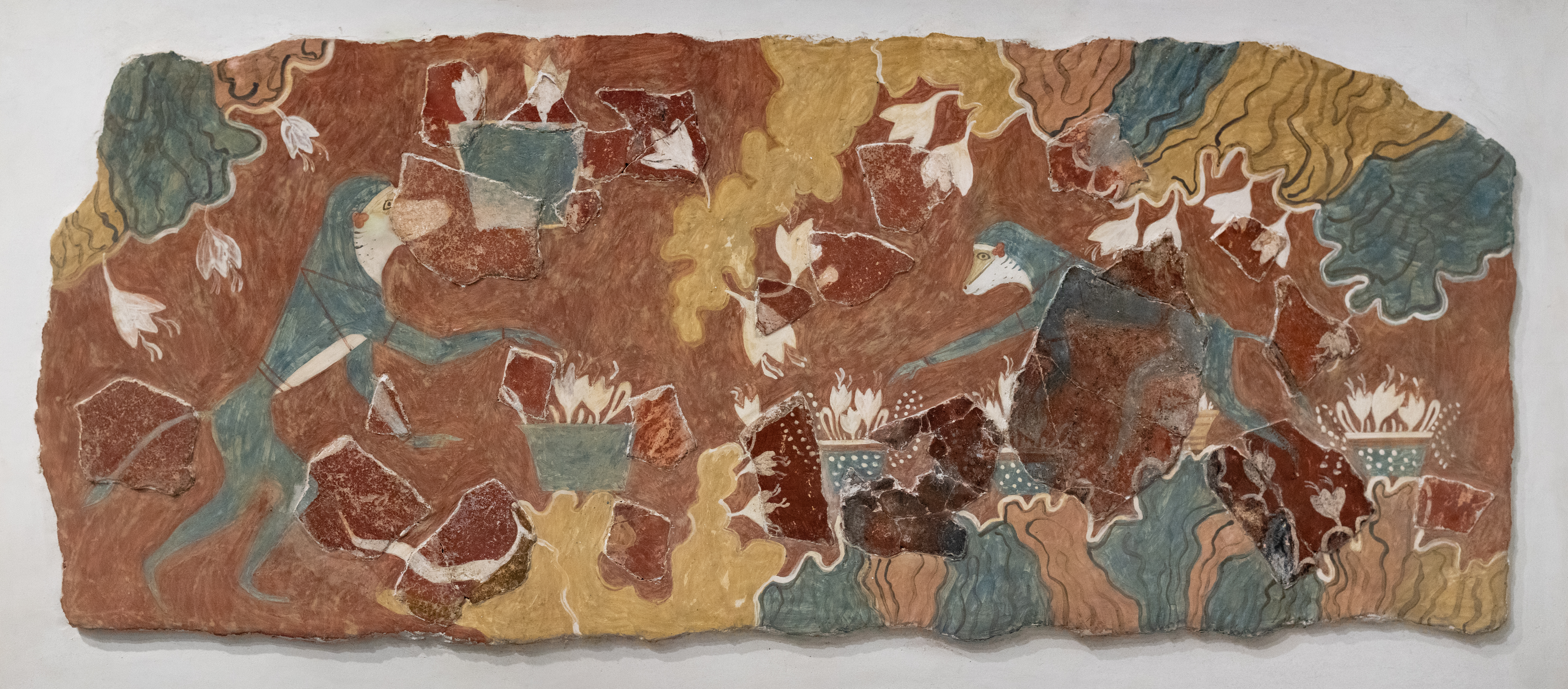
Saffron Gatherer fresco

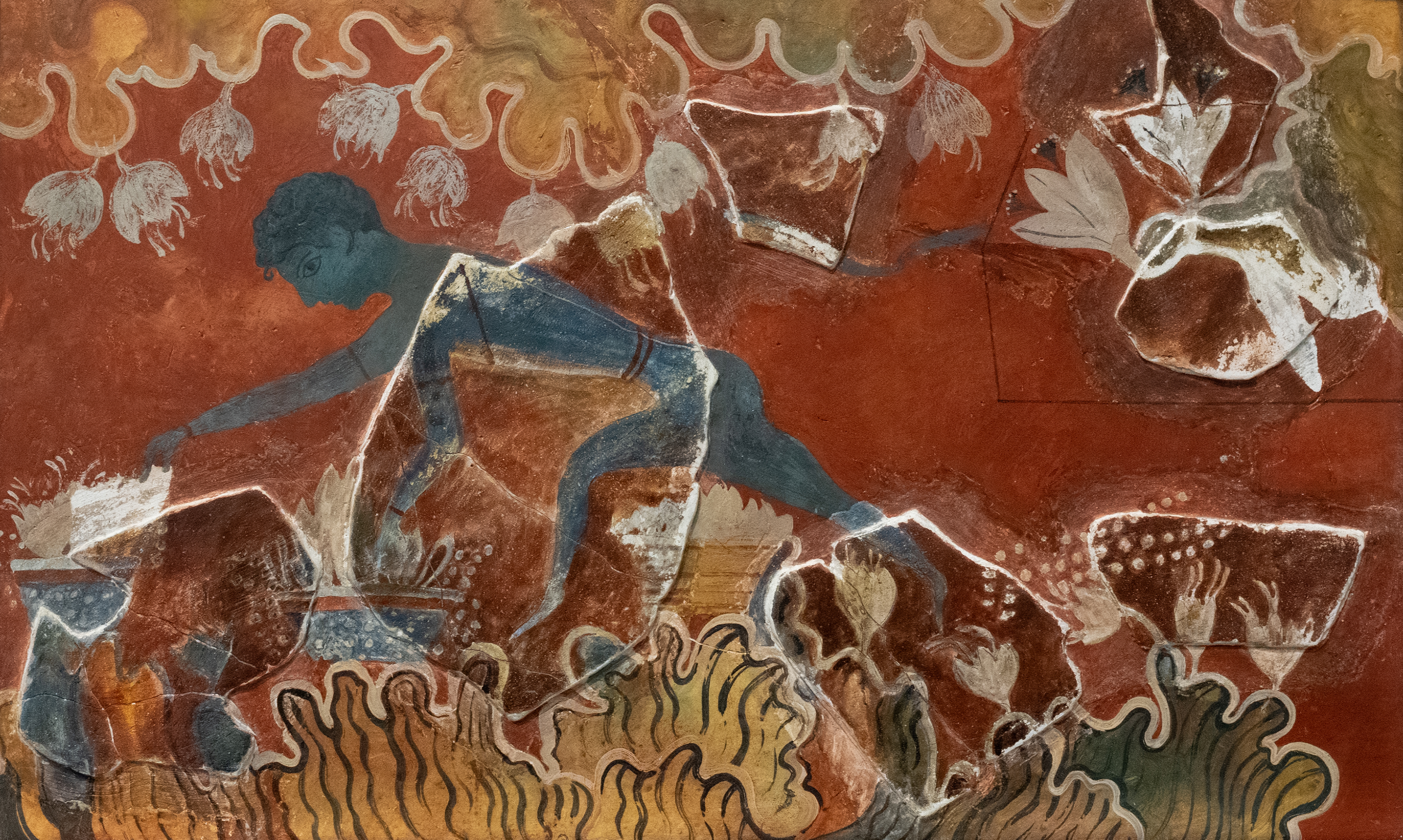
Saffron Gatherer fresco

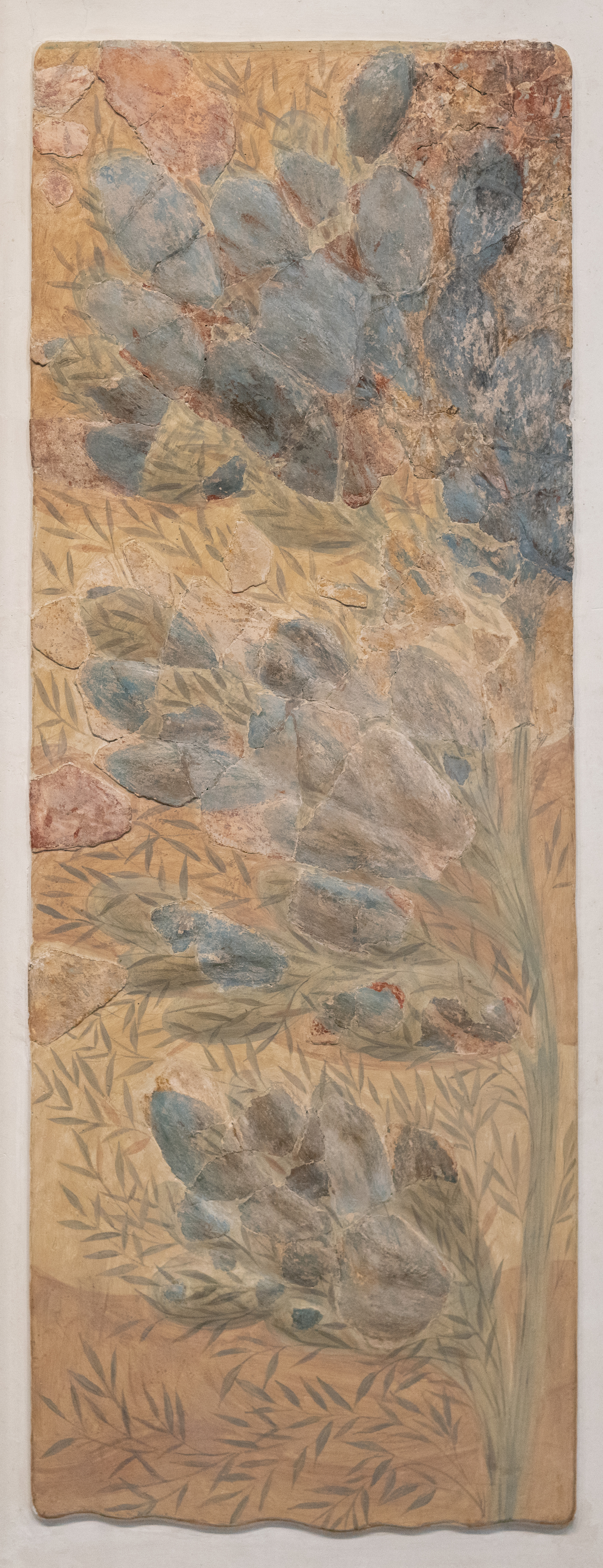
Olive tree fresco

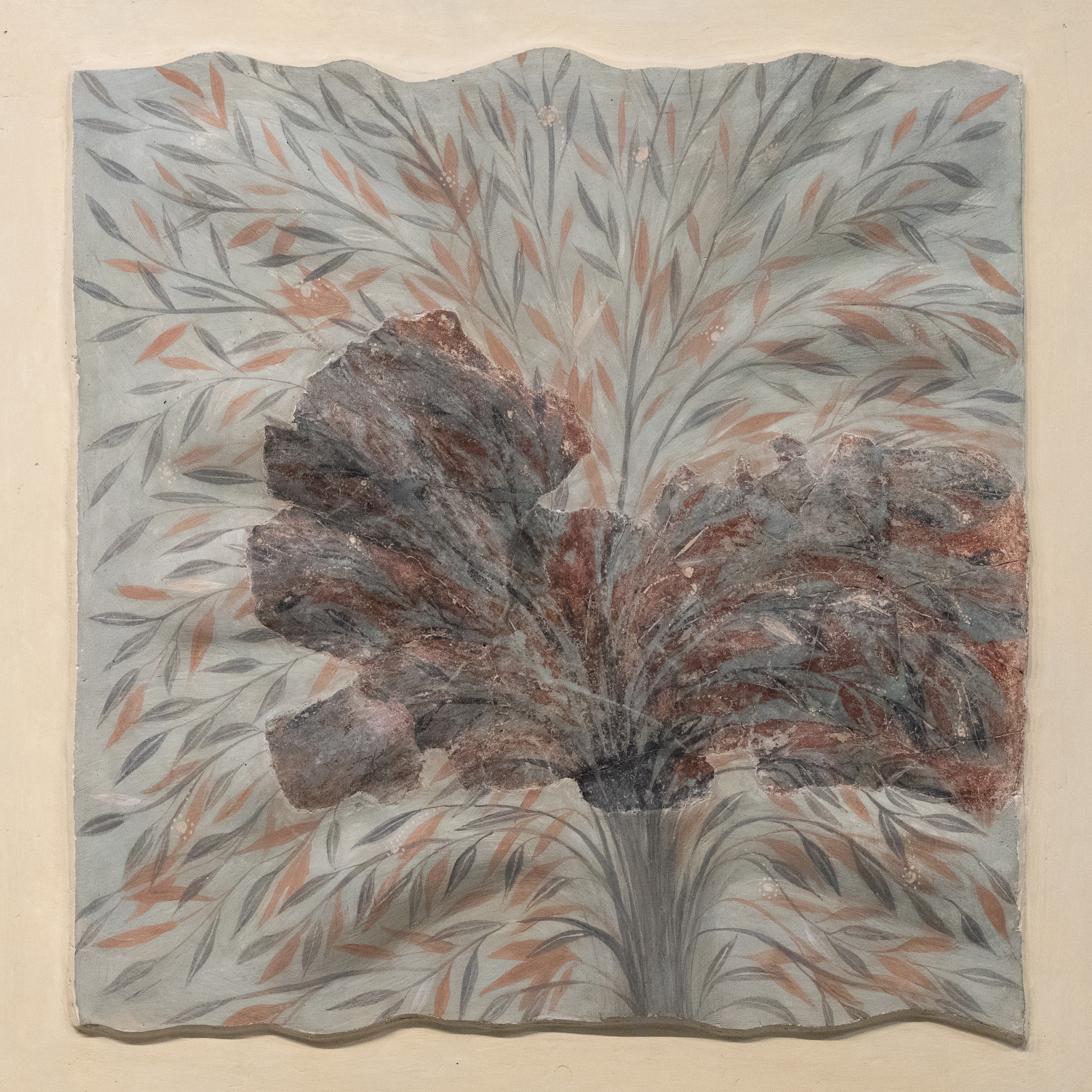
Olive tree fresco

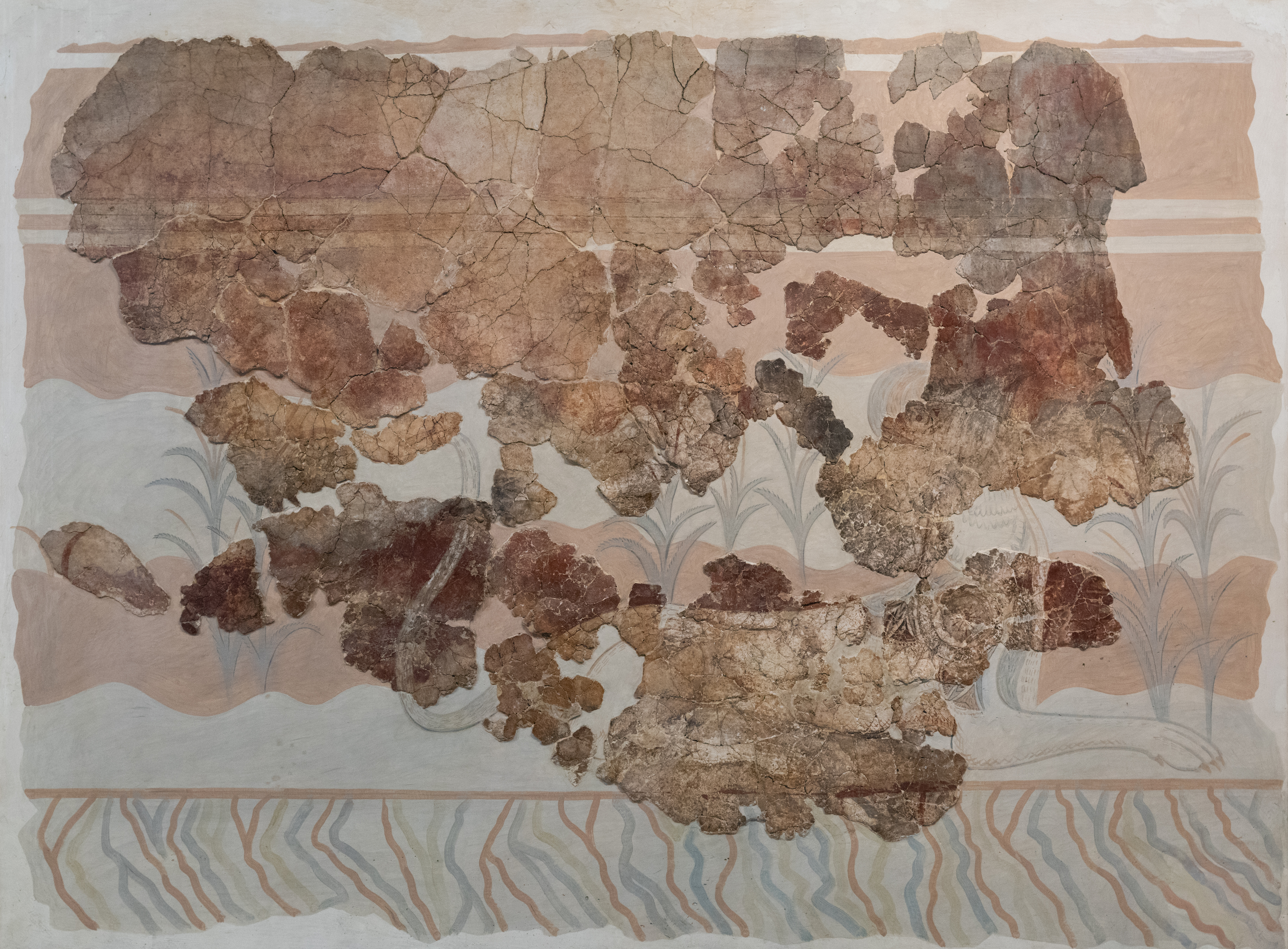
Knossos throne room grass fresco

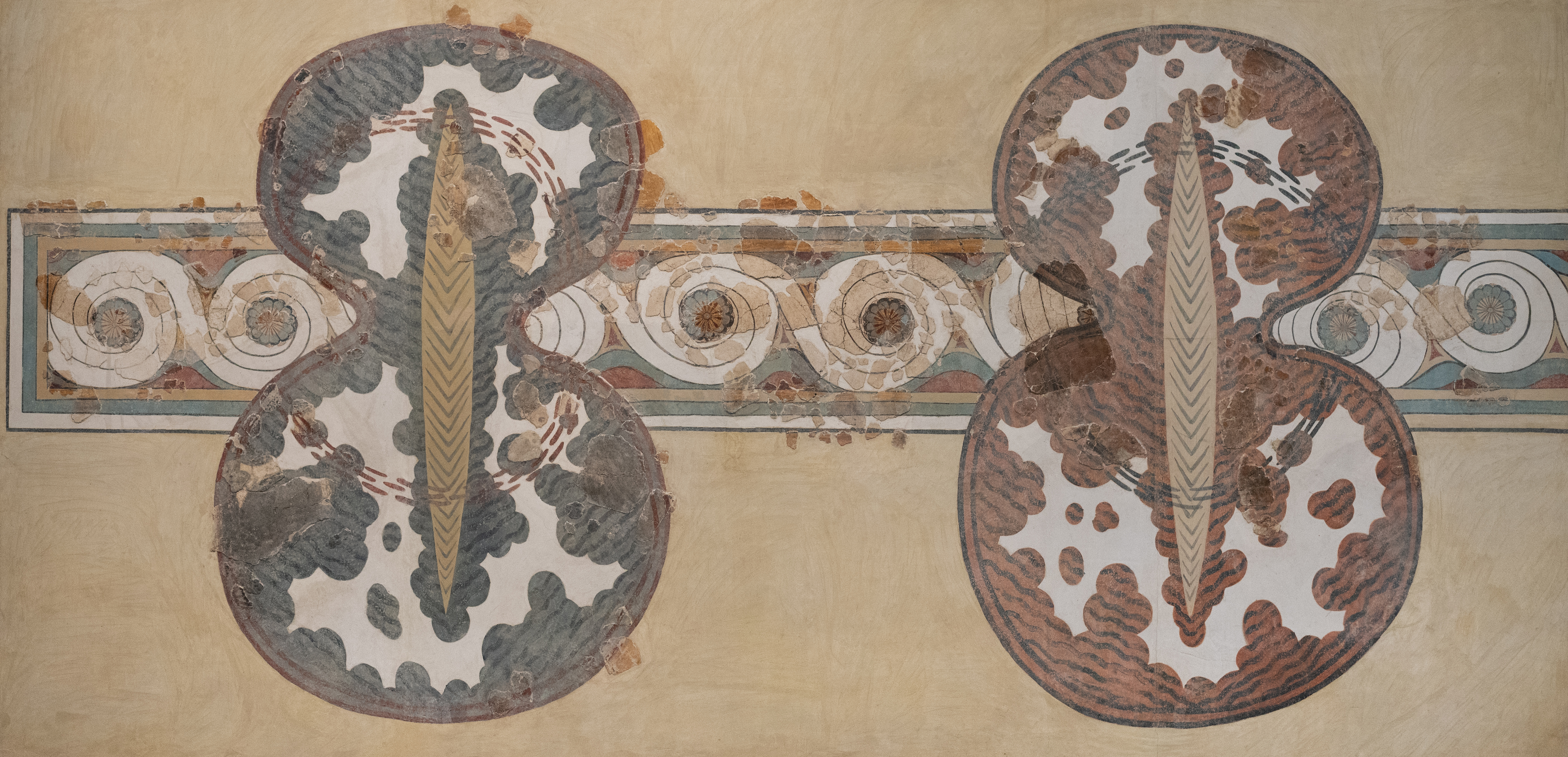
Figure of eight shields fresco

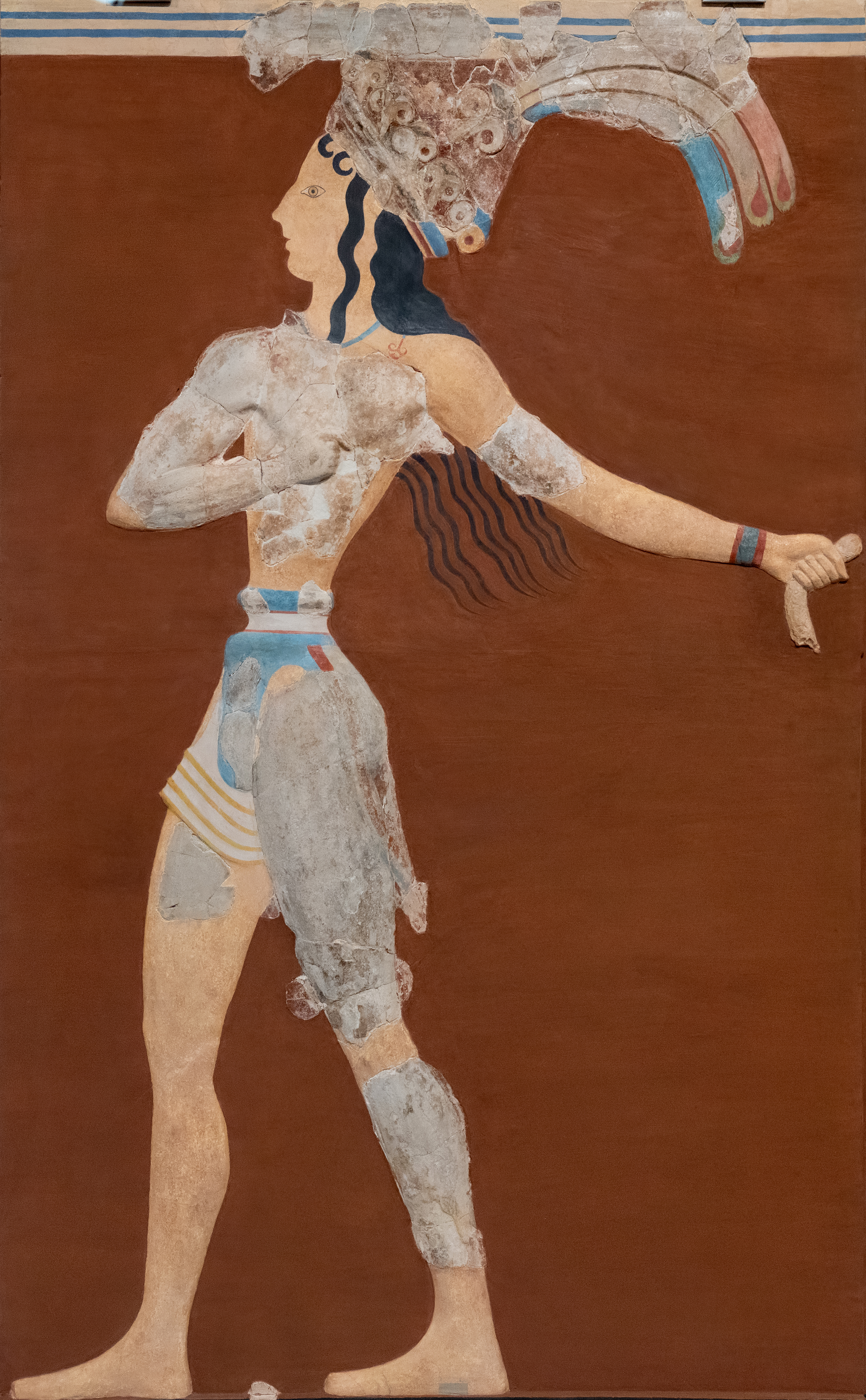
Prince of the Lilies

=== The Epiphany Cycle ===
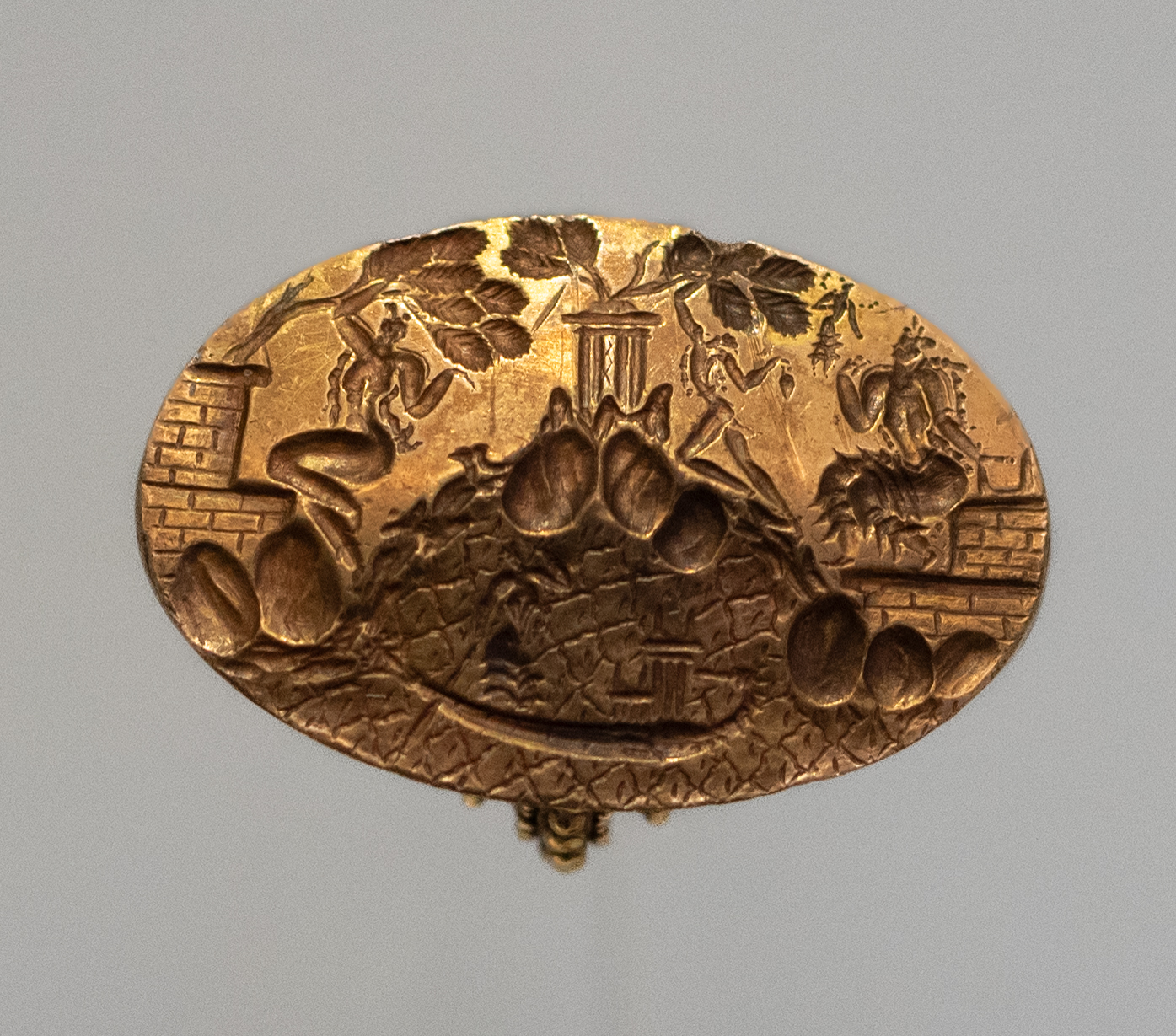
The ring of Minos. Knossos, 1450–1400 BC.

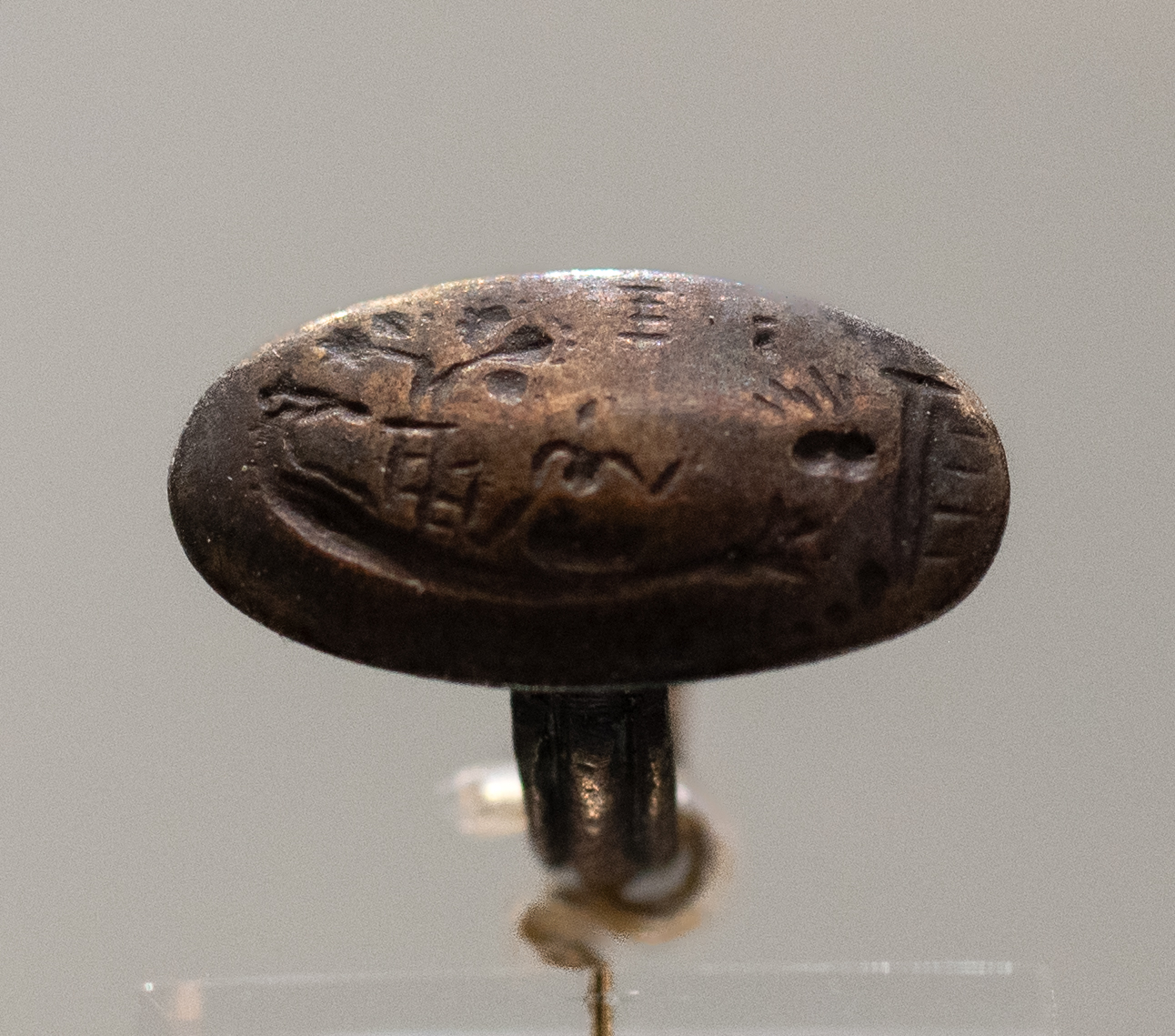
A boat carrying a seated female figure and a stepped shrine. Mochlos, 1450 BC.

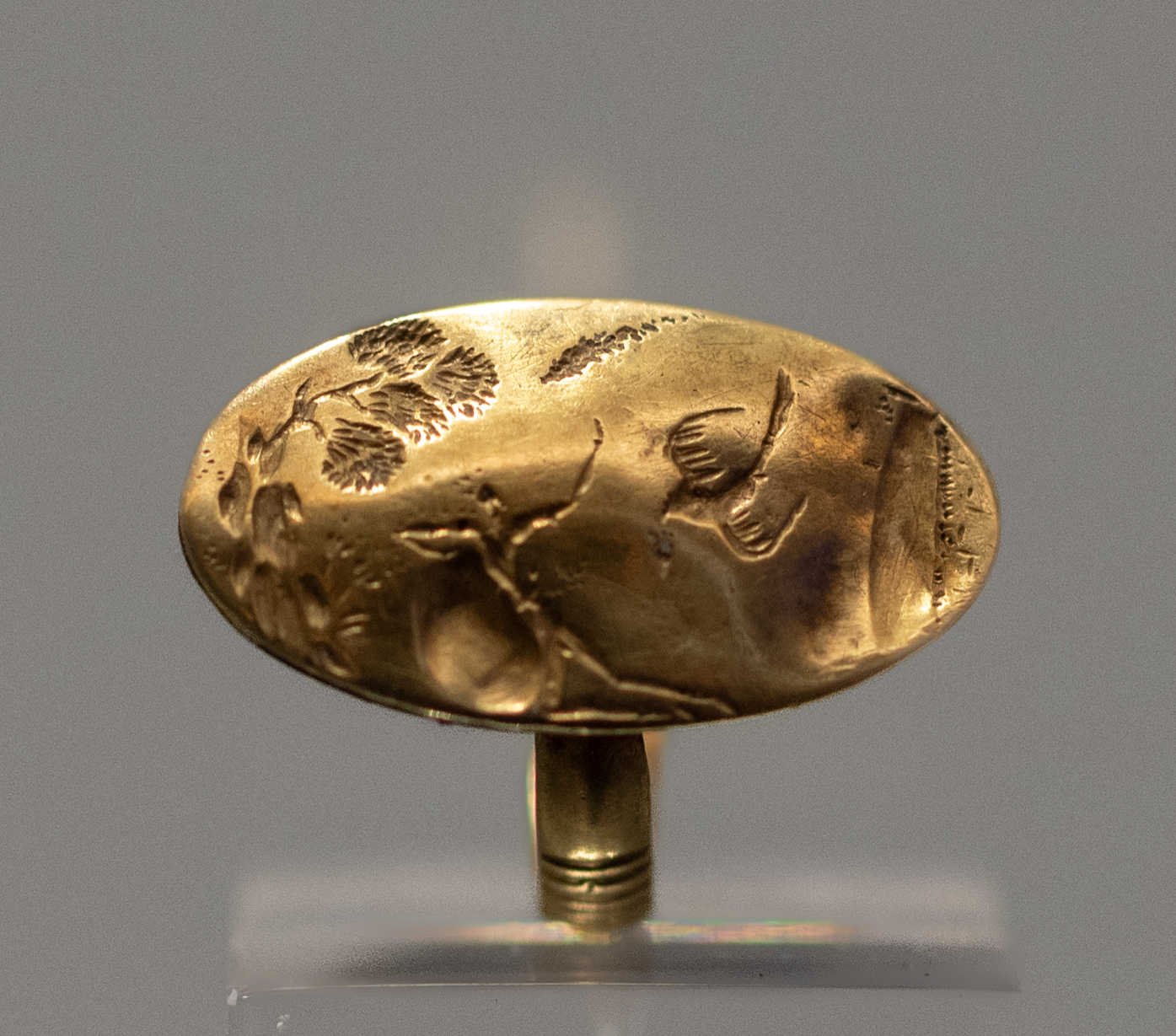
A male figure embracing a baetyl. Knossos, Sellopoulo, 1400–1375 BC.

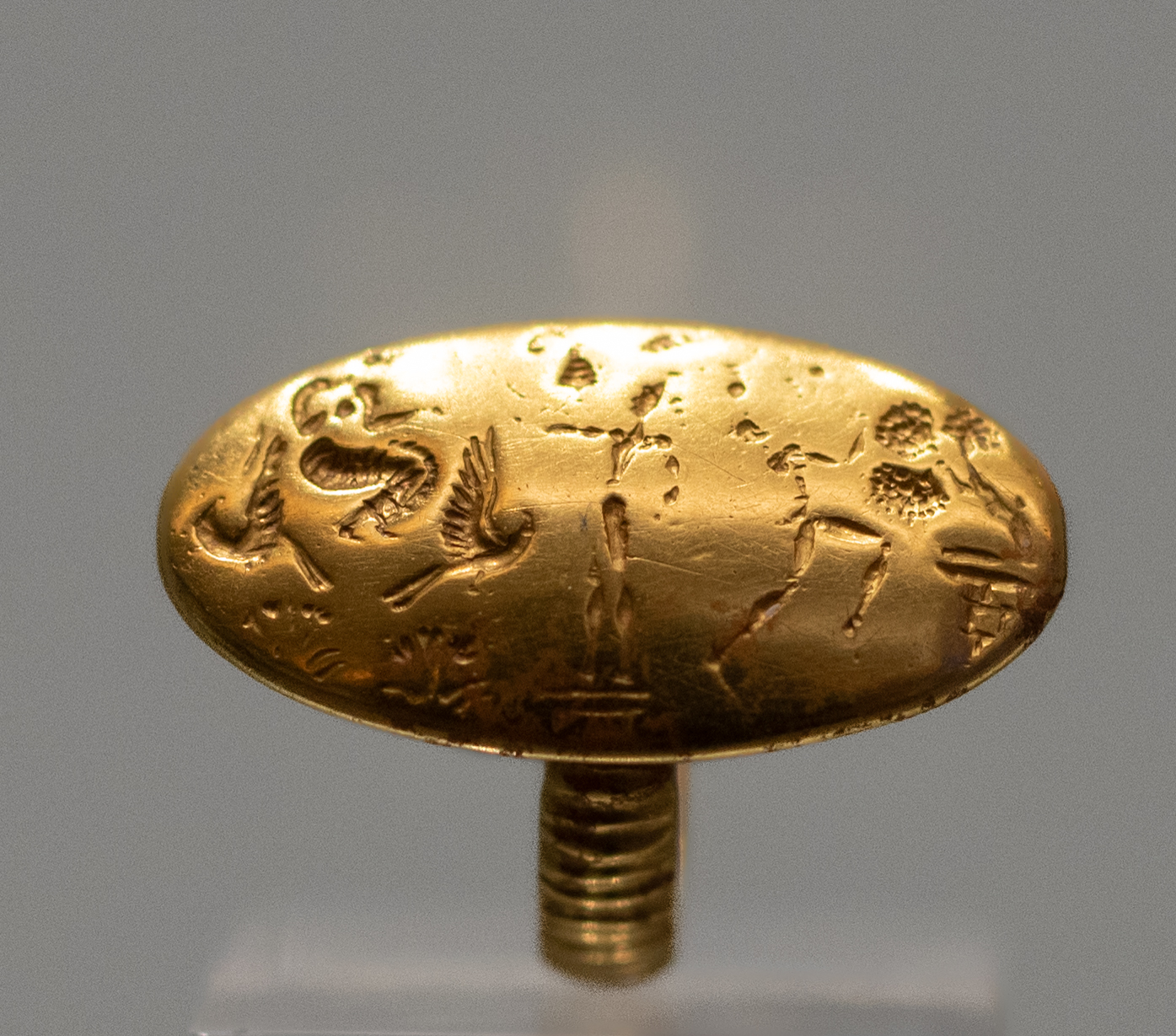
A Sacred Conversation. Poros, 1500–1450 BC.

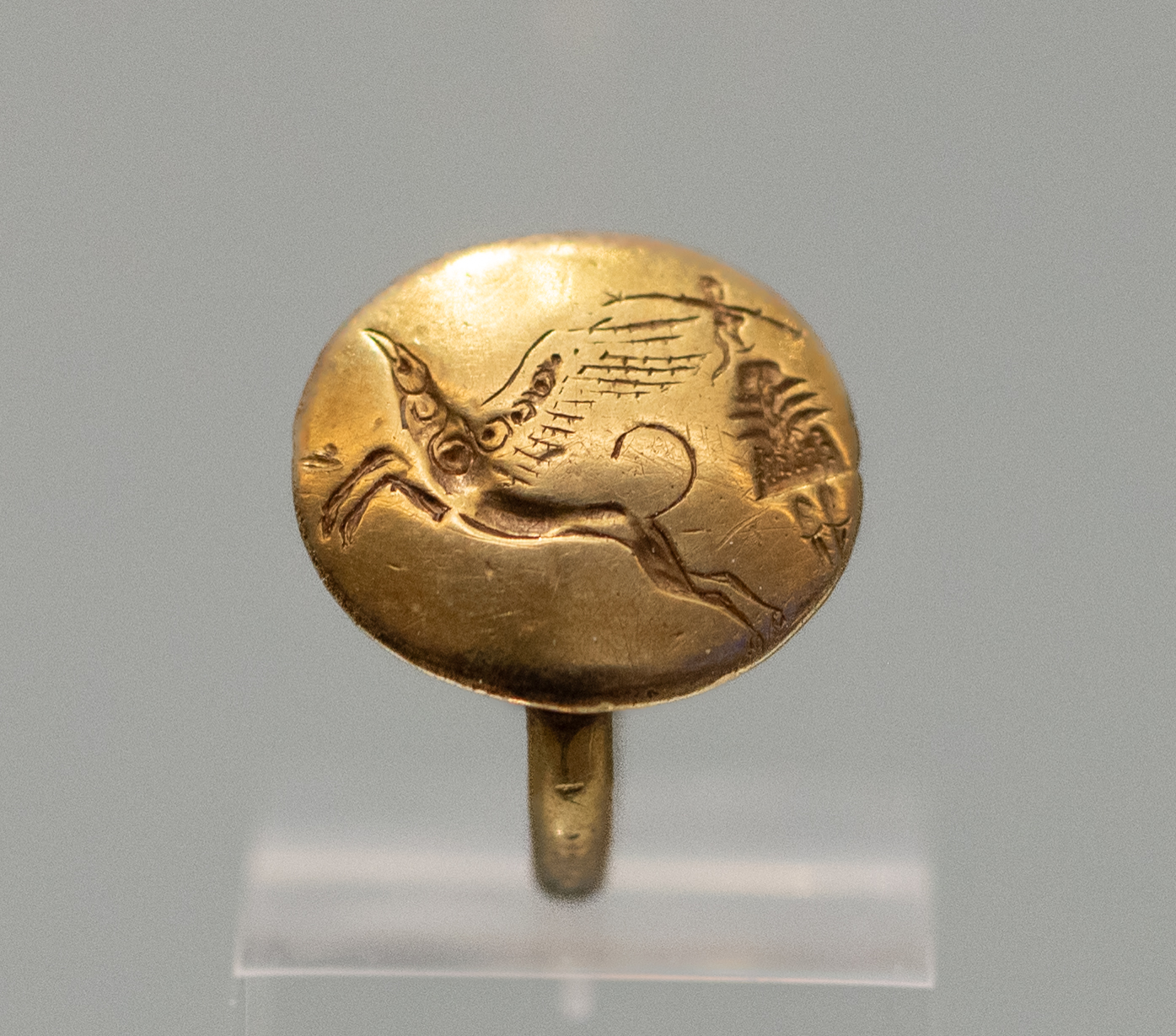
A ring with a female figure and a griffin. Archanes, Phourni, 1700–1450 BC.

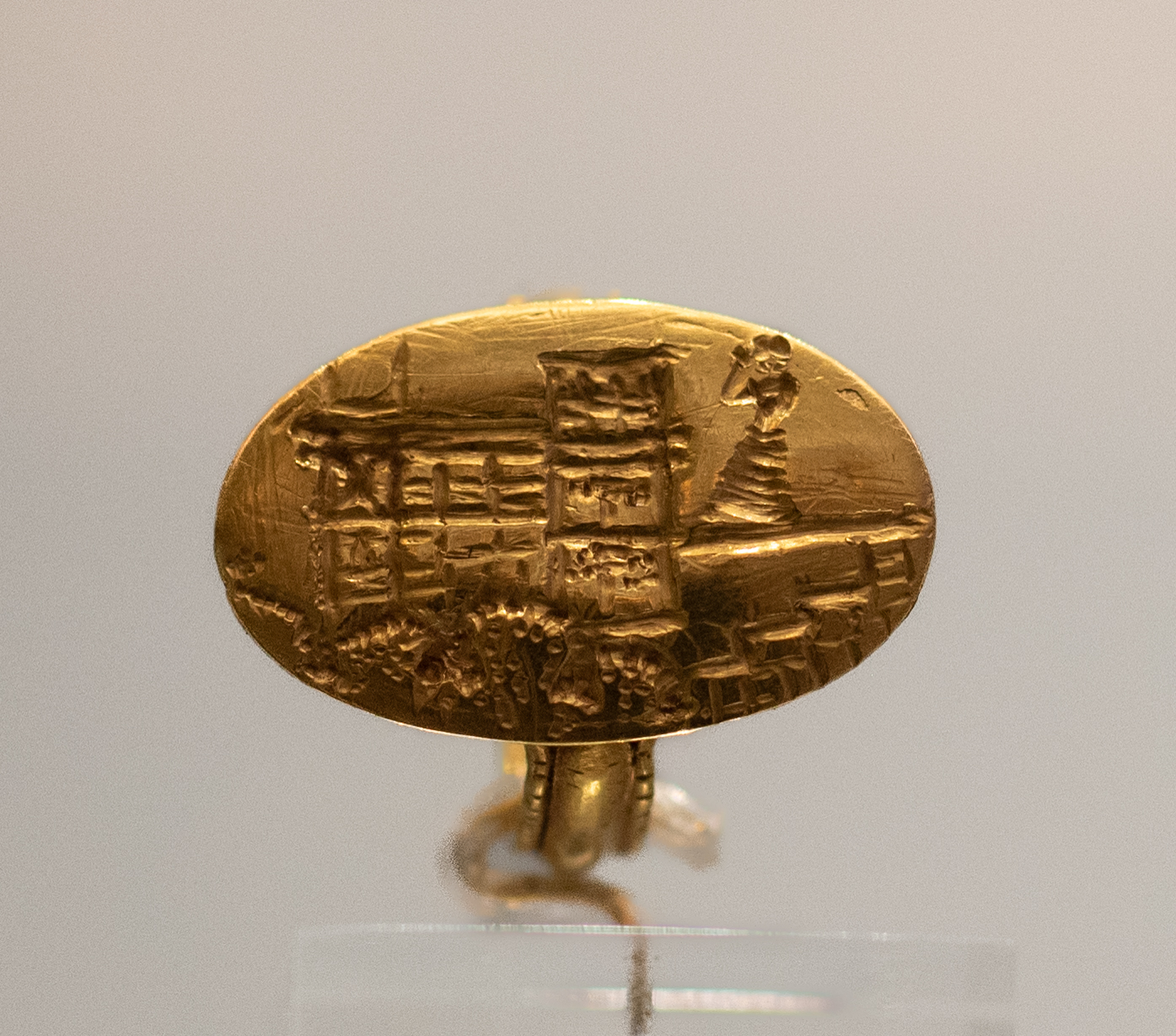
A shrine on a hill. Poros, 1500–1450 BC.

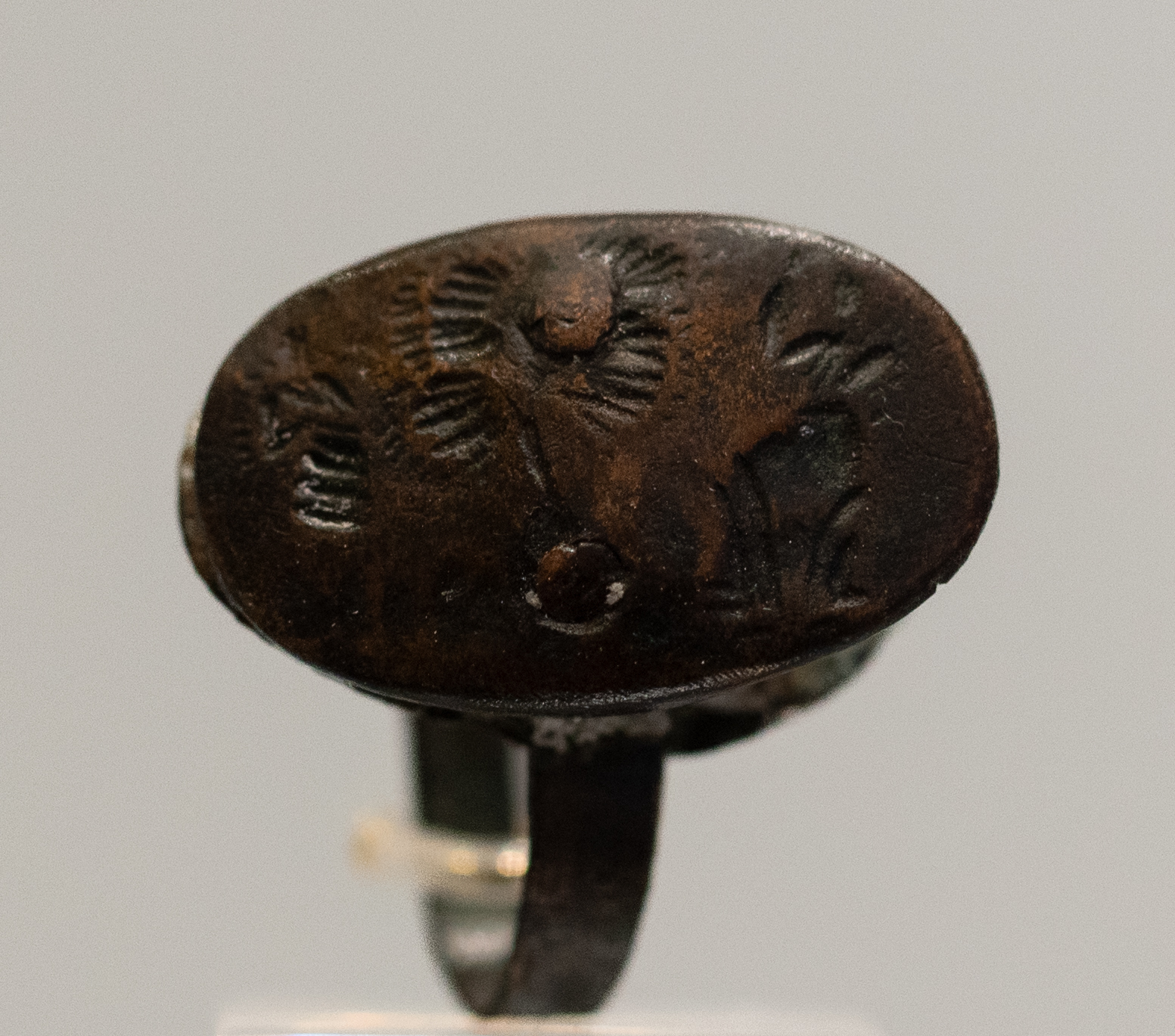
A female figure hovering in front of a tree. Gournia, 1600–1300 BC.

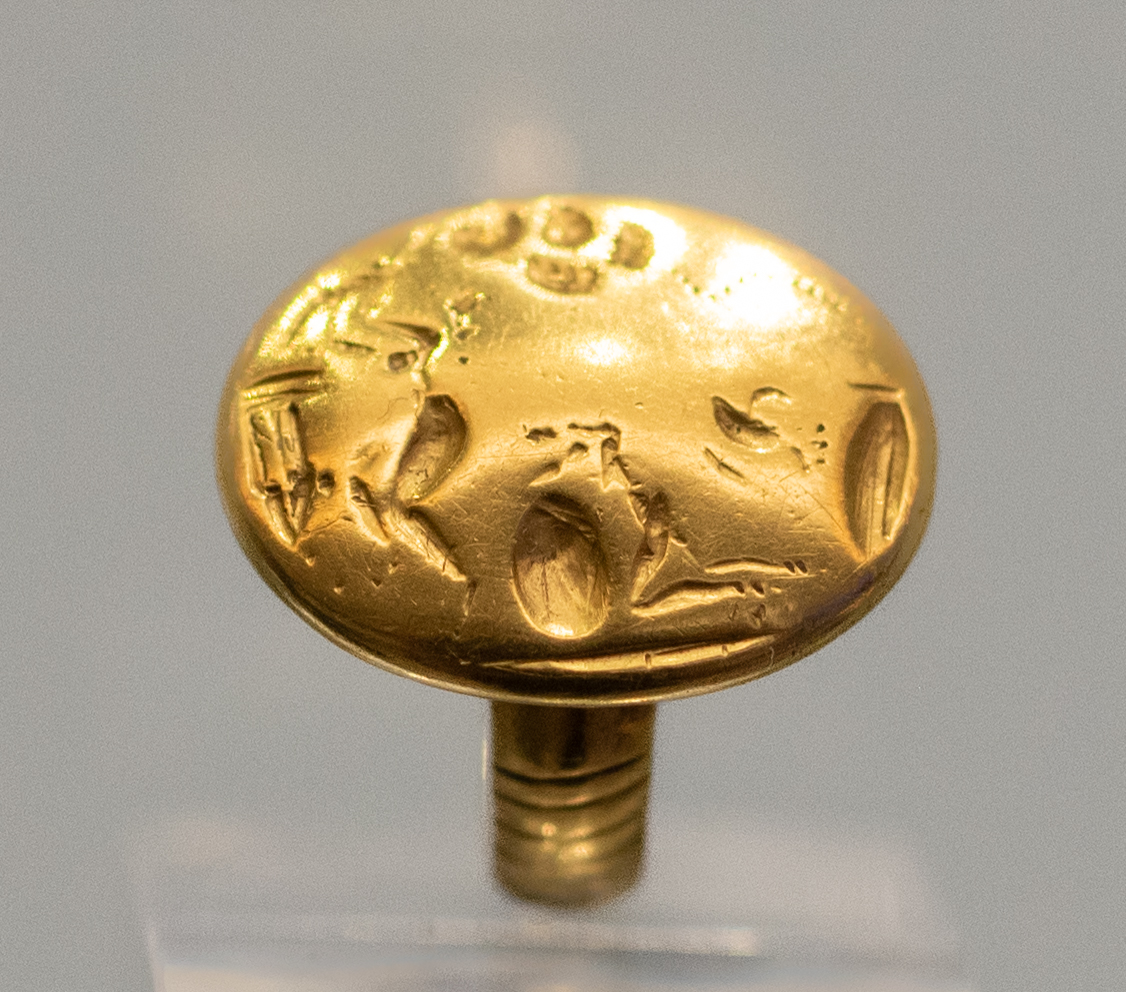
Tree and baetyl worship. Phaistos, Kalivia, 1500–1450 BC.

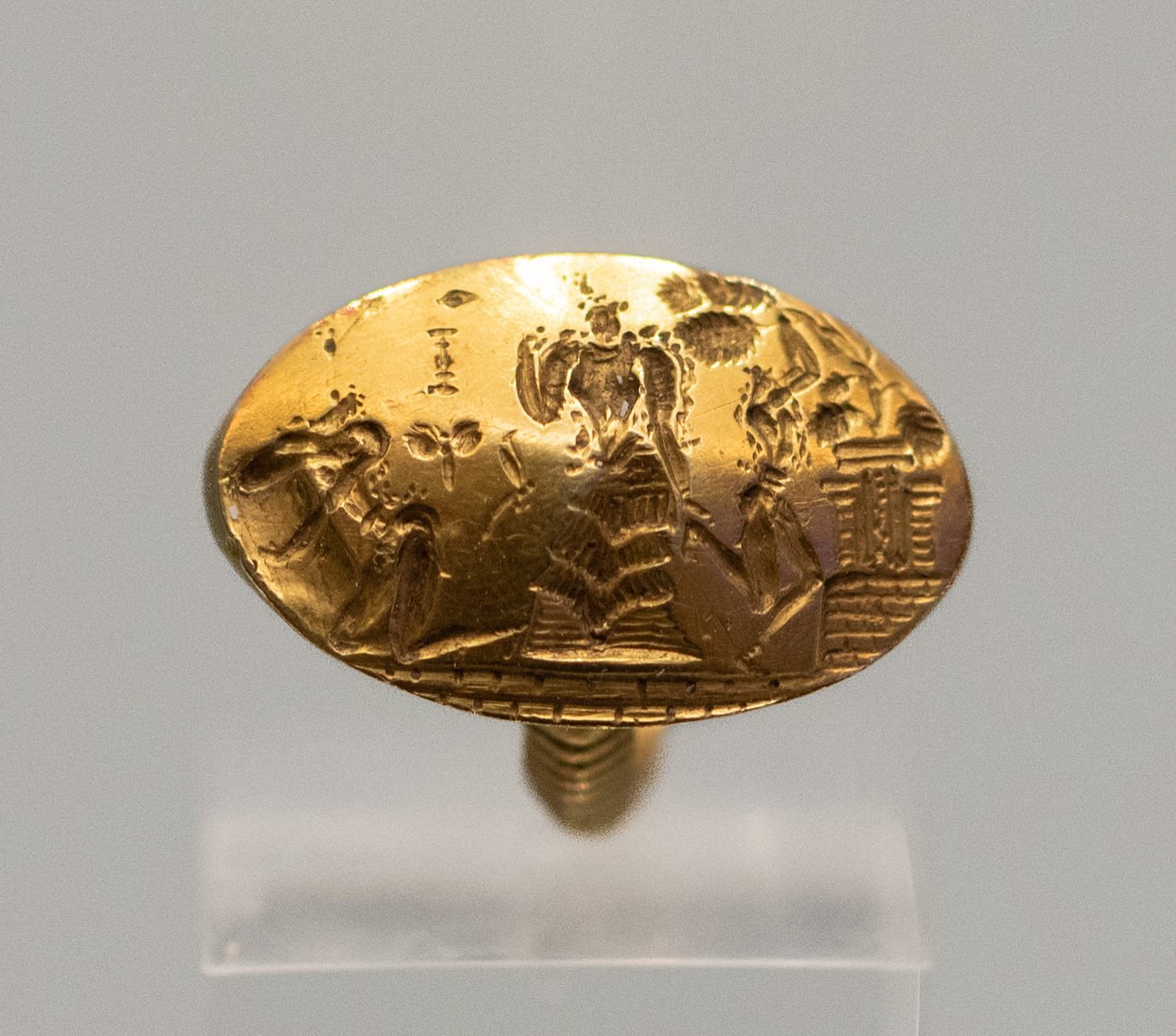
A goddess or a priestess among insects. Archanes, Phourni, 1700–1450 BC.

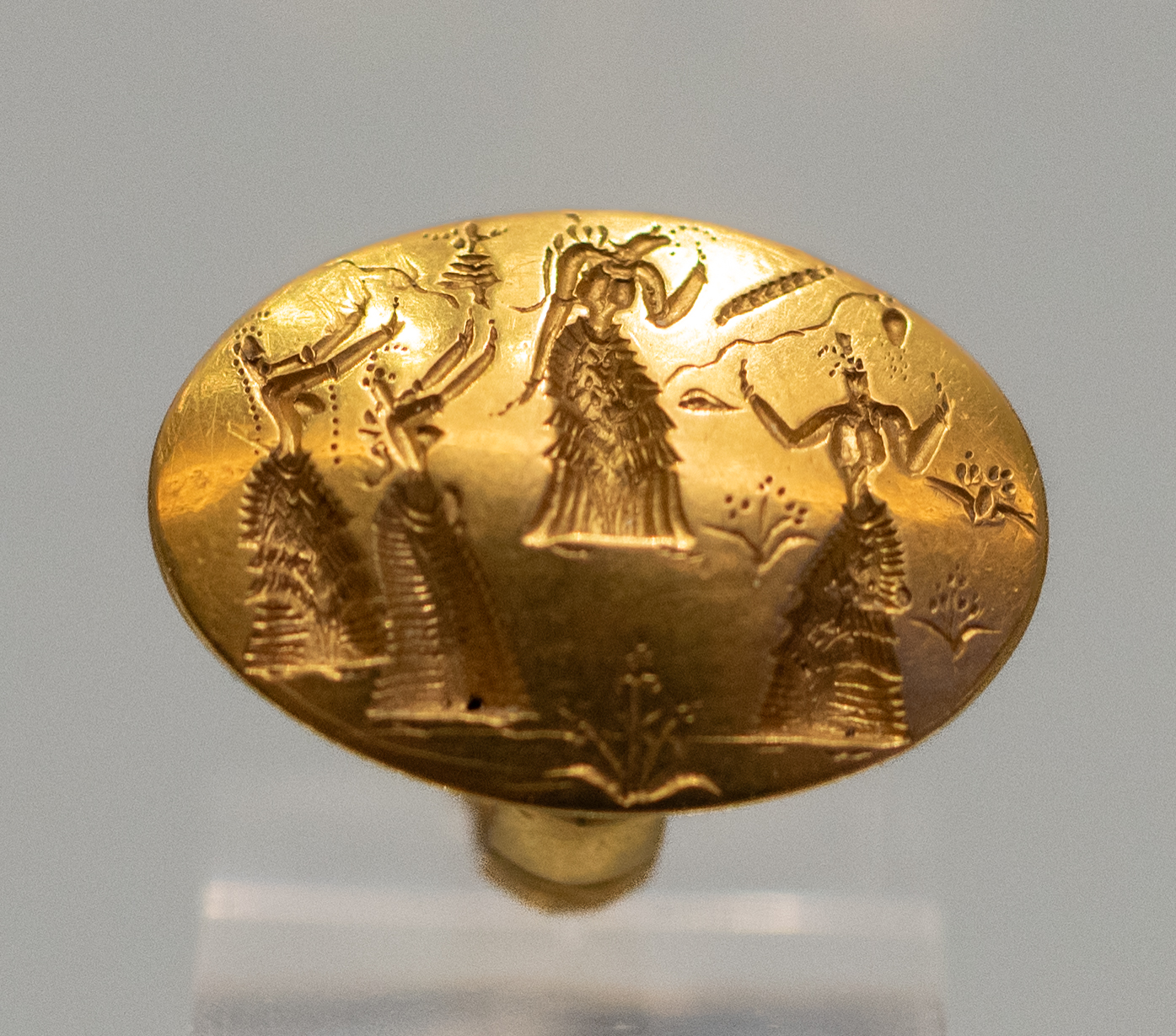
Women dancing. Knossos, Isopata, 1500–1450 BC.

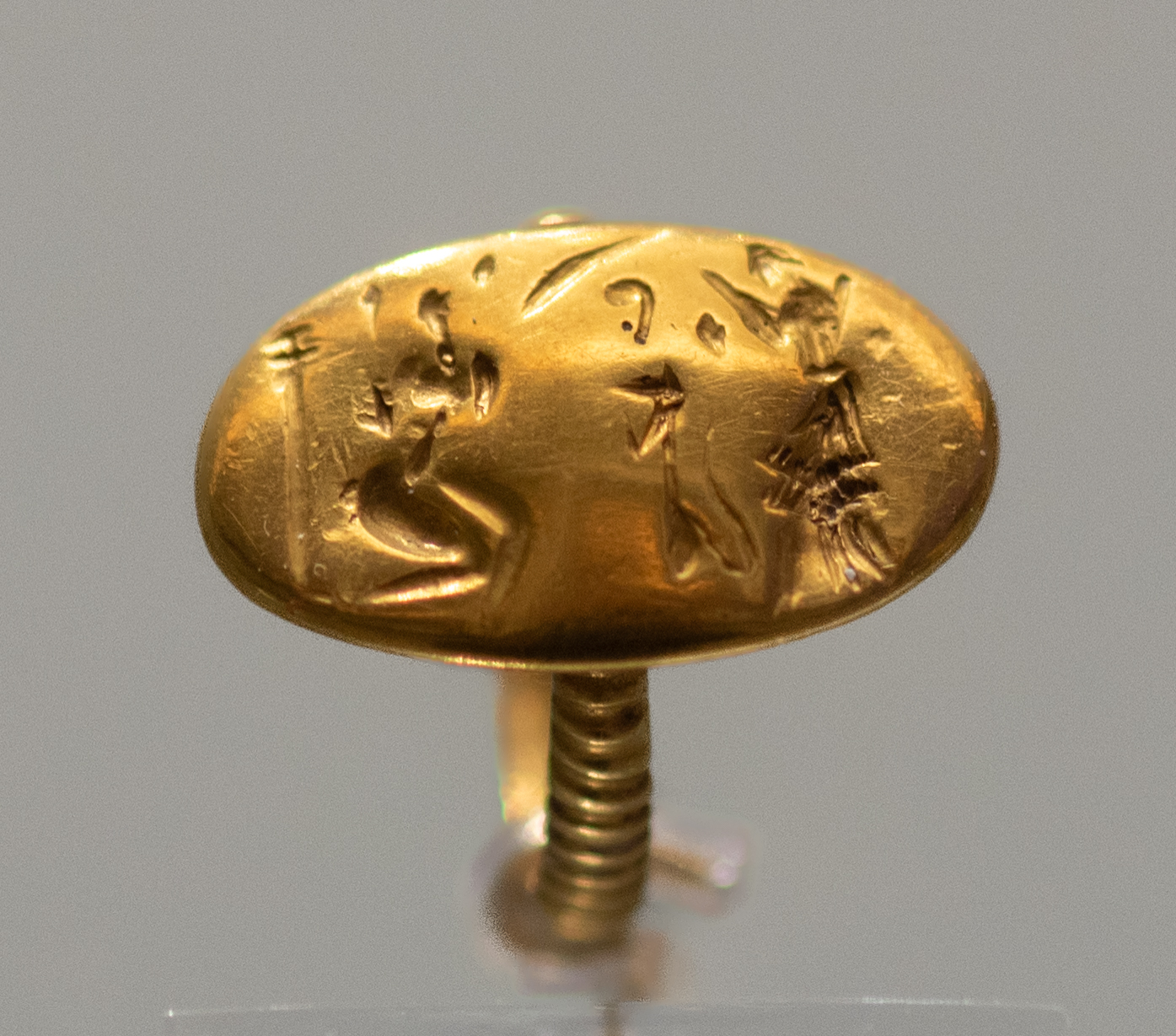
A seated goddess, a worshipper and a monkey. Phaistos, Kalivia, 1500–1450 BC.

== See also ==
- List of museums in Greece
- Minoan pottery

== Bibliography ==
- The Rough Guide to Crete. ISBN 1-84353-292-1.
