= Aegina Treasure =

Minoan gold hoard

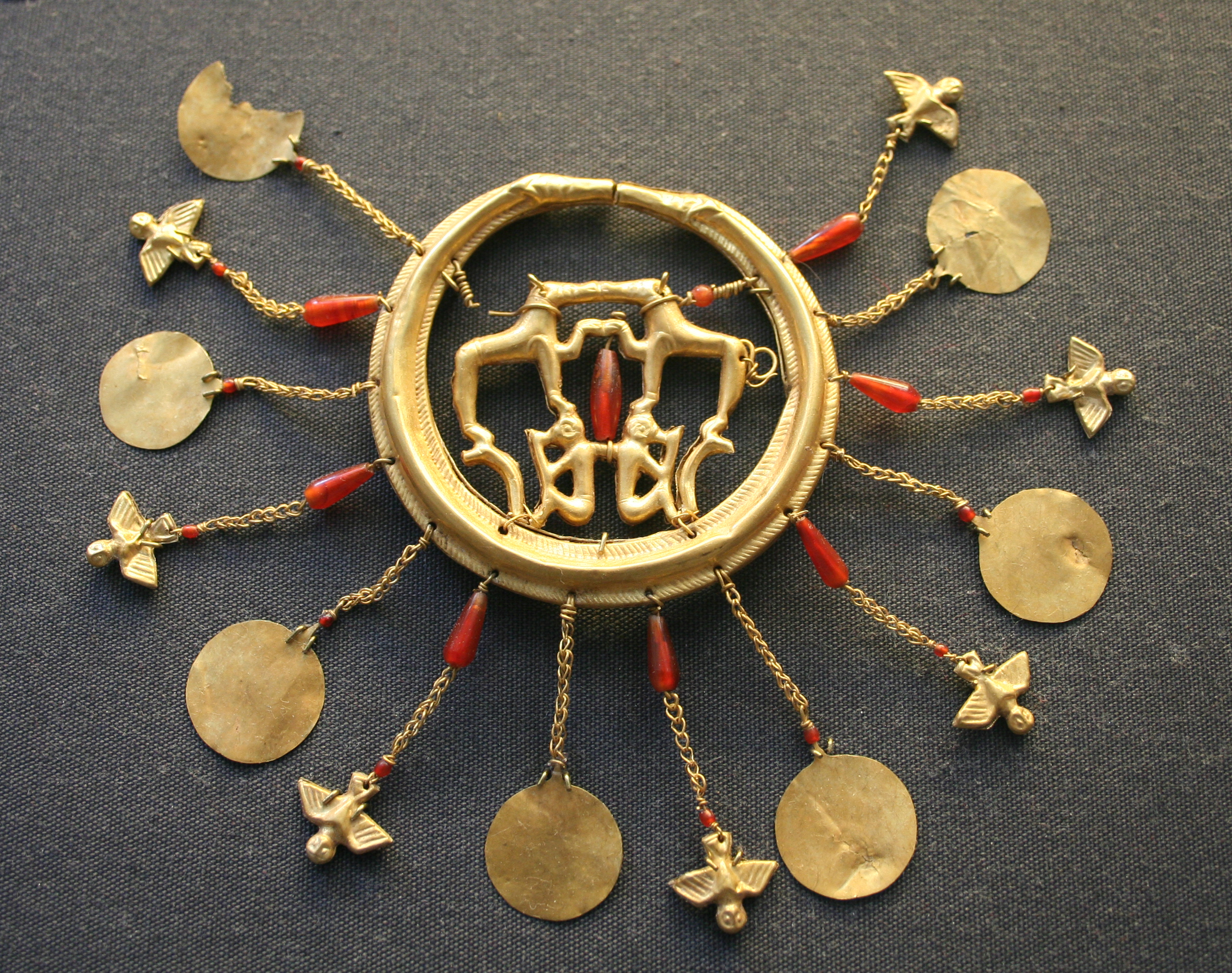
- Elaborate gold earring (one of a pair) from the Aegina Treasure in the British Museum
- Material: Gold
- Size: Height 10.3 cm
- Created: 1850-1550 BC
- Present location: British Museum, London

The Aegina Treasure or Aigina Treasure is an important Minoan gold hoard said to have been found on the island of Aegina, Greece. Since 1892, it has been part of the British Museum's collection. It is one of the most important groups of Minoan jewellery.

The Aegina Treasure is composed largely of gold jewellery that has been dated, based on its style and iconography, to the Greek Bronze Age between 1850 and 1550 BC, so "Middle Minoan II" and III in most versions of the Minoan chronology. It includes two pairs of ornate earrings, three diadems, a chest pendant, a bracelet, a gold cup, four rings, ornamented plaques and plain strips. There are also five hoops or rings and many beads and pendants made of a variety of materials including gold, lapis lazuli, amethyst, quartz, cornelian and green jasper.

== Discovery ==
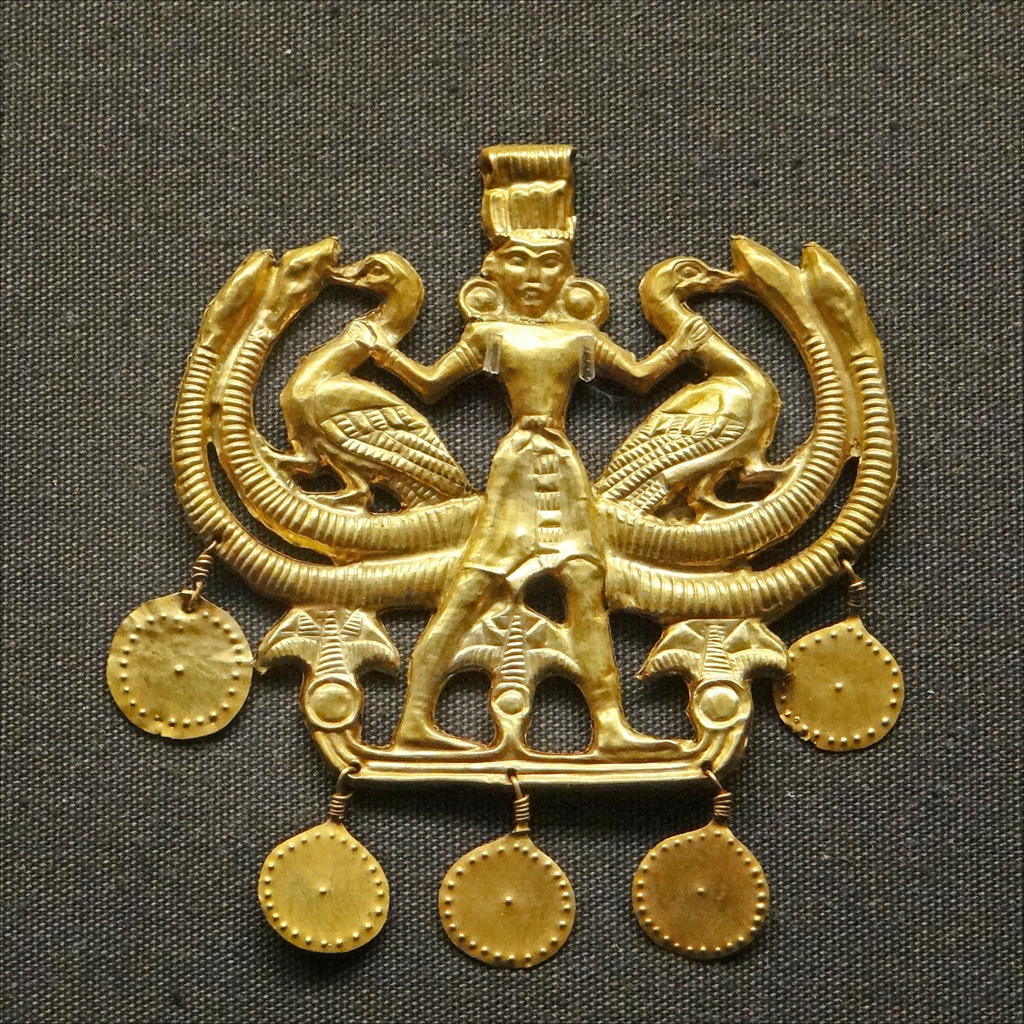
The Master of Animals pendant

The treasure was said to have been found in a tomb on the island of Aegina, not far from Athens, in 1891, although the exact circumstances have never been determined. The British Museum purchased the bulk of the treasure in 1892 from the Cresswell Brothers, a London firm of sponge dealers. Further pieces from the treasure were bought by the museum in 1914.

Many, or most, scholars now believe the hoard was actually excavated at the Chryssolakkos necropolis at Malia, where what the locals called the "gold hole" into tombs near the Minoan palace, had been largely cleared out by the time archaeologists got there. However, the locals had overlooked the spectacular Malia Pendant (found in 1930) and some other pieces, now in the Heraklion Archaeological Museum.

== Pendant and Earrings ==
The most elaborate items in the treasure are a chest pendant and a pair of earrings. The pendant seems to represent a Cretan deity flanked by two geese in a field. Behind him appear to stand two sacred bulls' horns. The god relates to the Master of Animals figures found in much art of the Ancient Near East. The pair of earrings are designed in the shape of double-headed snakes which encircle two pairs of facing greyhounds.

== See also ==
- Priam's Treasure
- Mask of Agamemnon

== Gallery ==
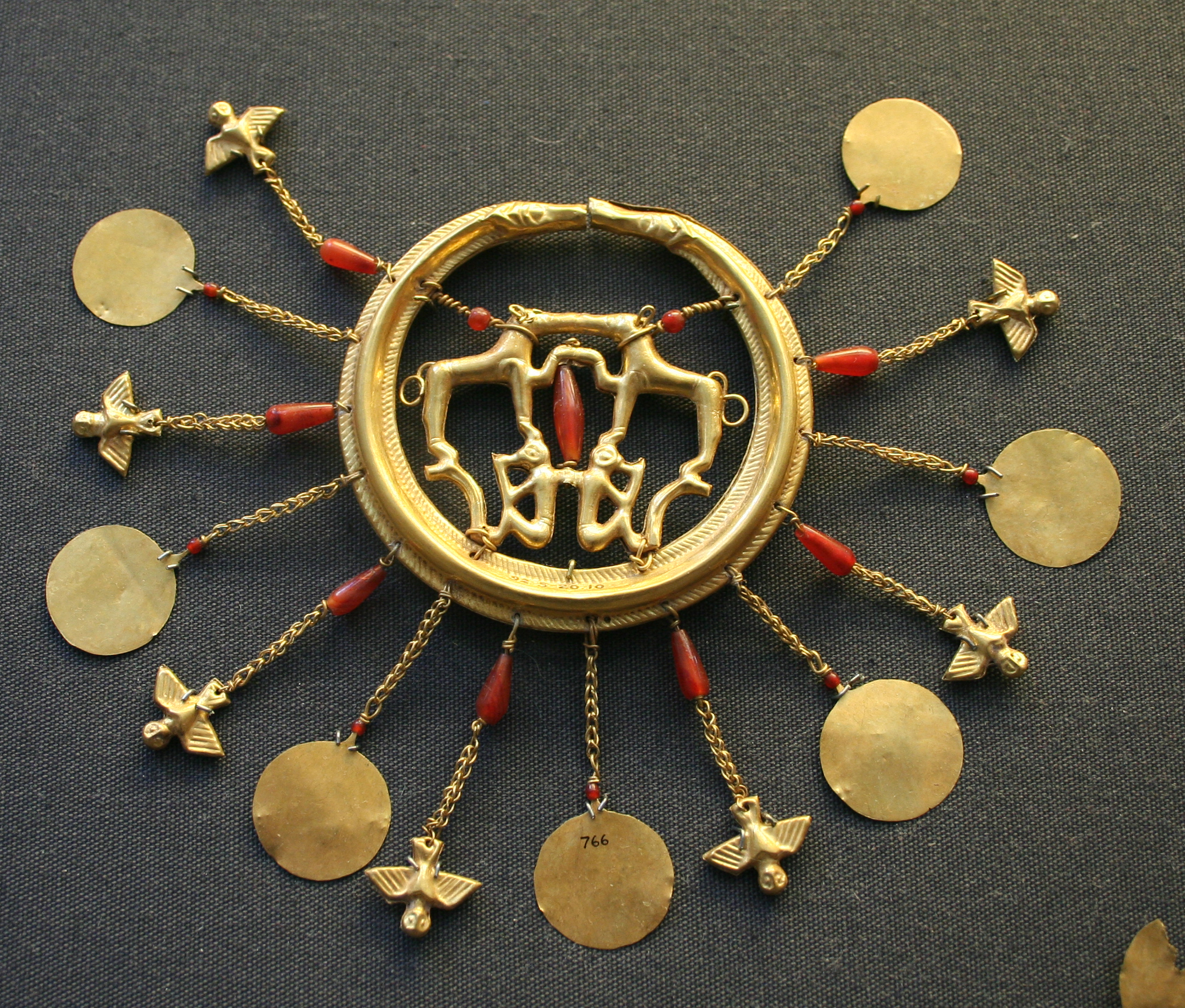
The other elaborate earring

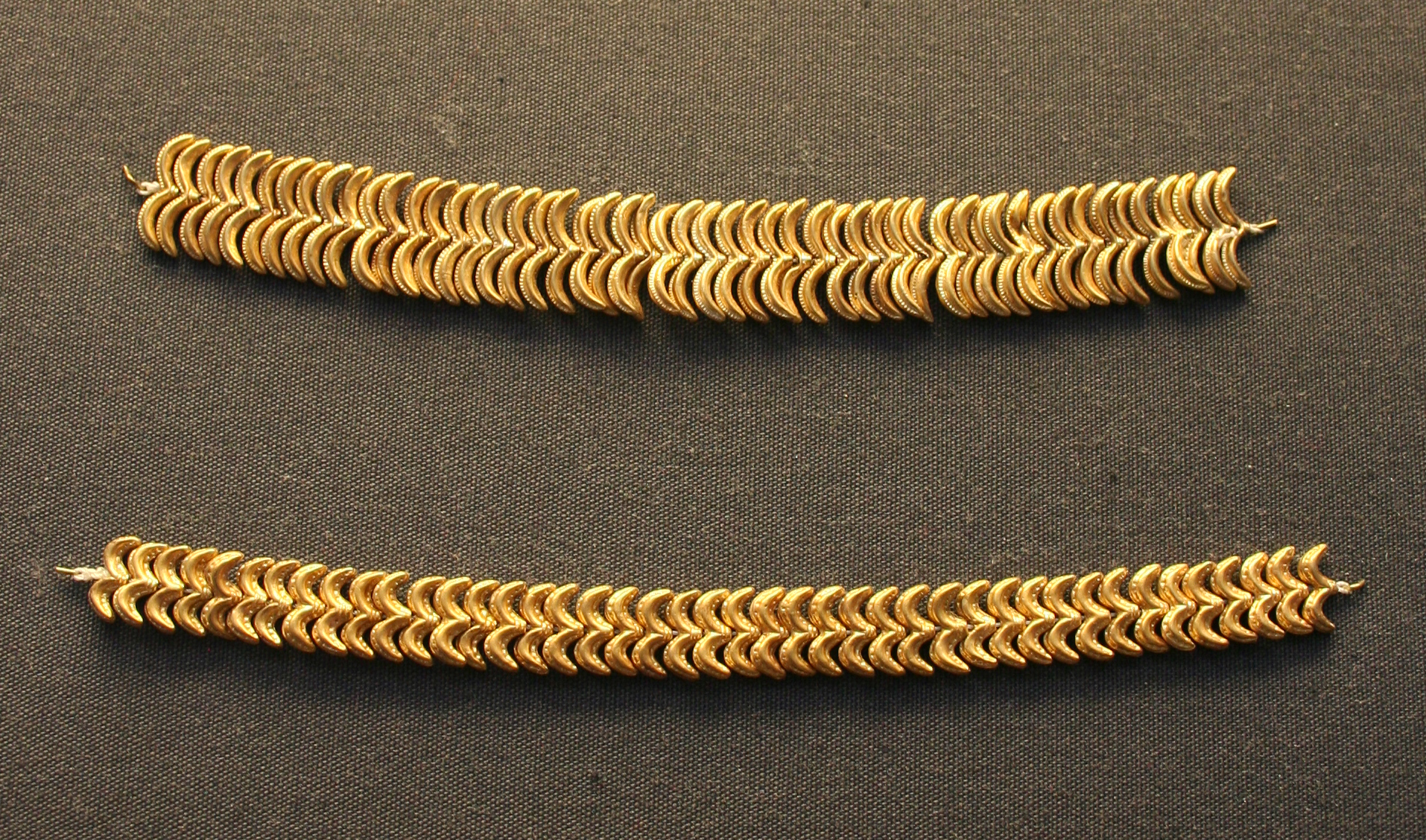
Two sets of golden beads

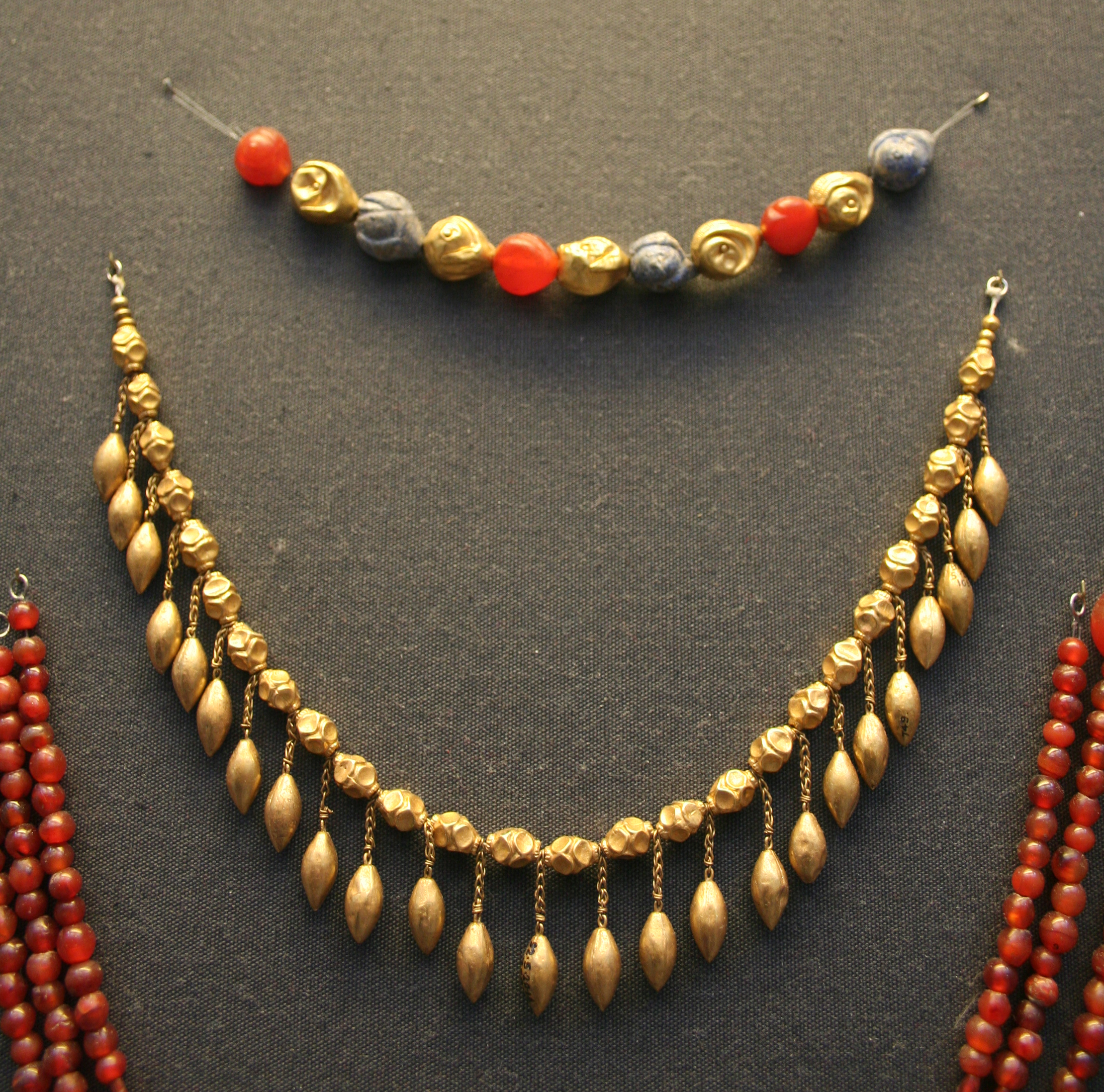
Various necklaces from the hoard

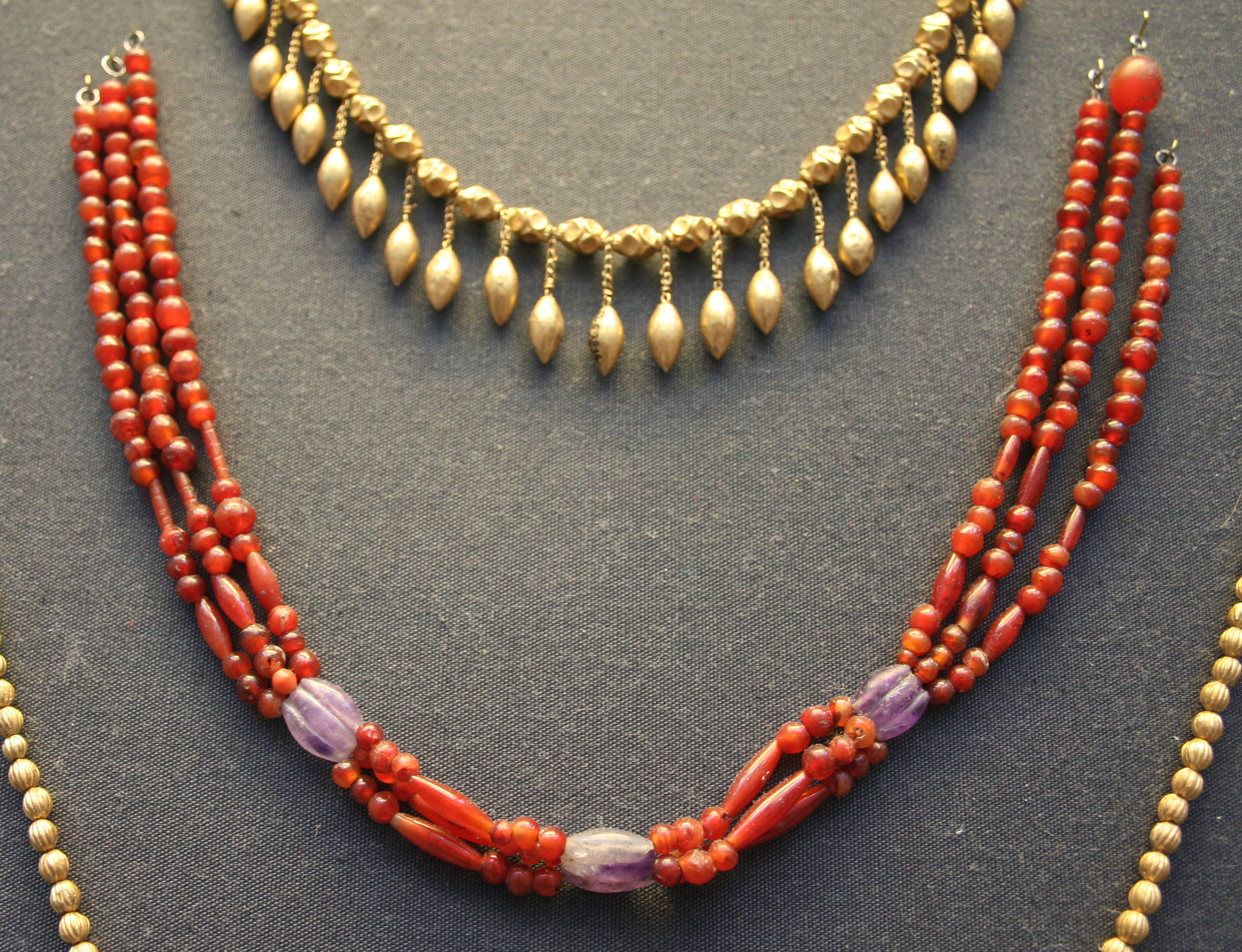
Necklaces made of gold, cornelian and jasper

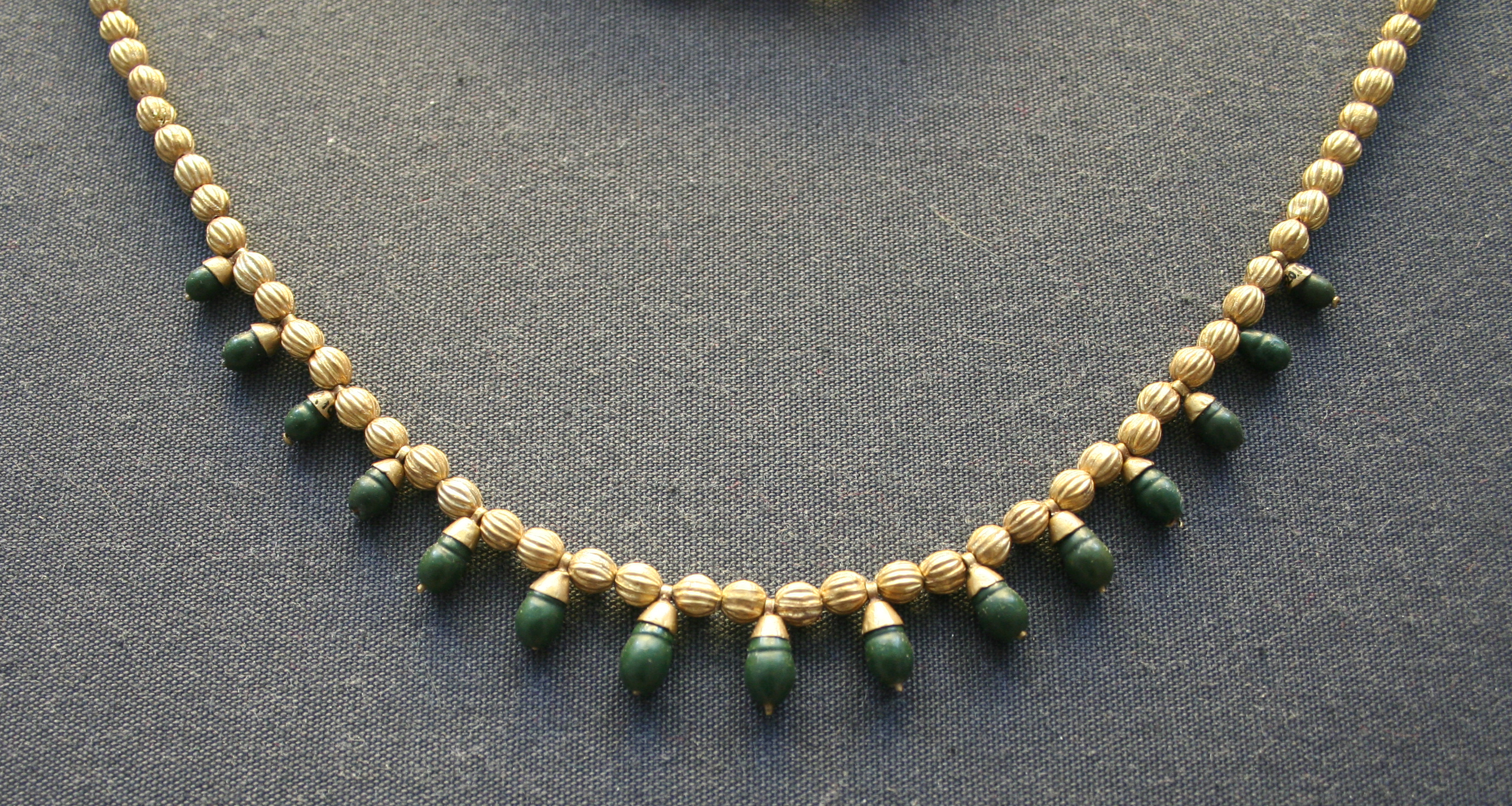
Necklace made of golden beads and pendants of jasper

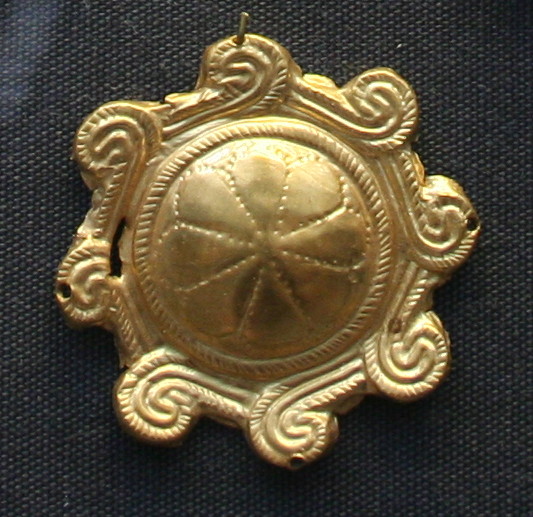
One of 54 identical gold plaques

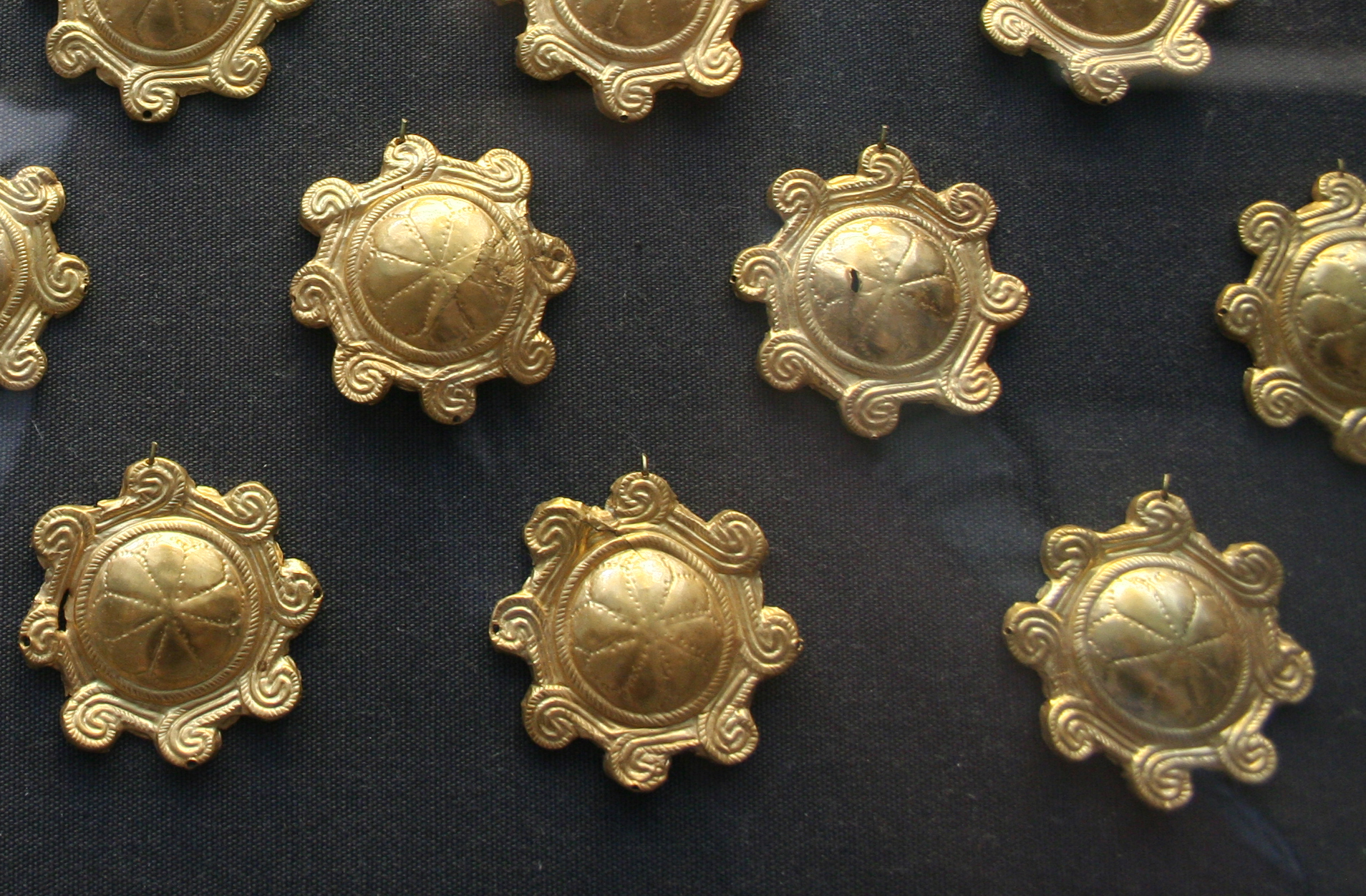
More plaques with convex bosses decorated with rosettes of petals.

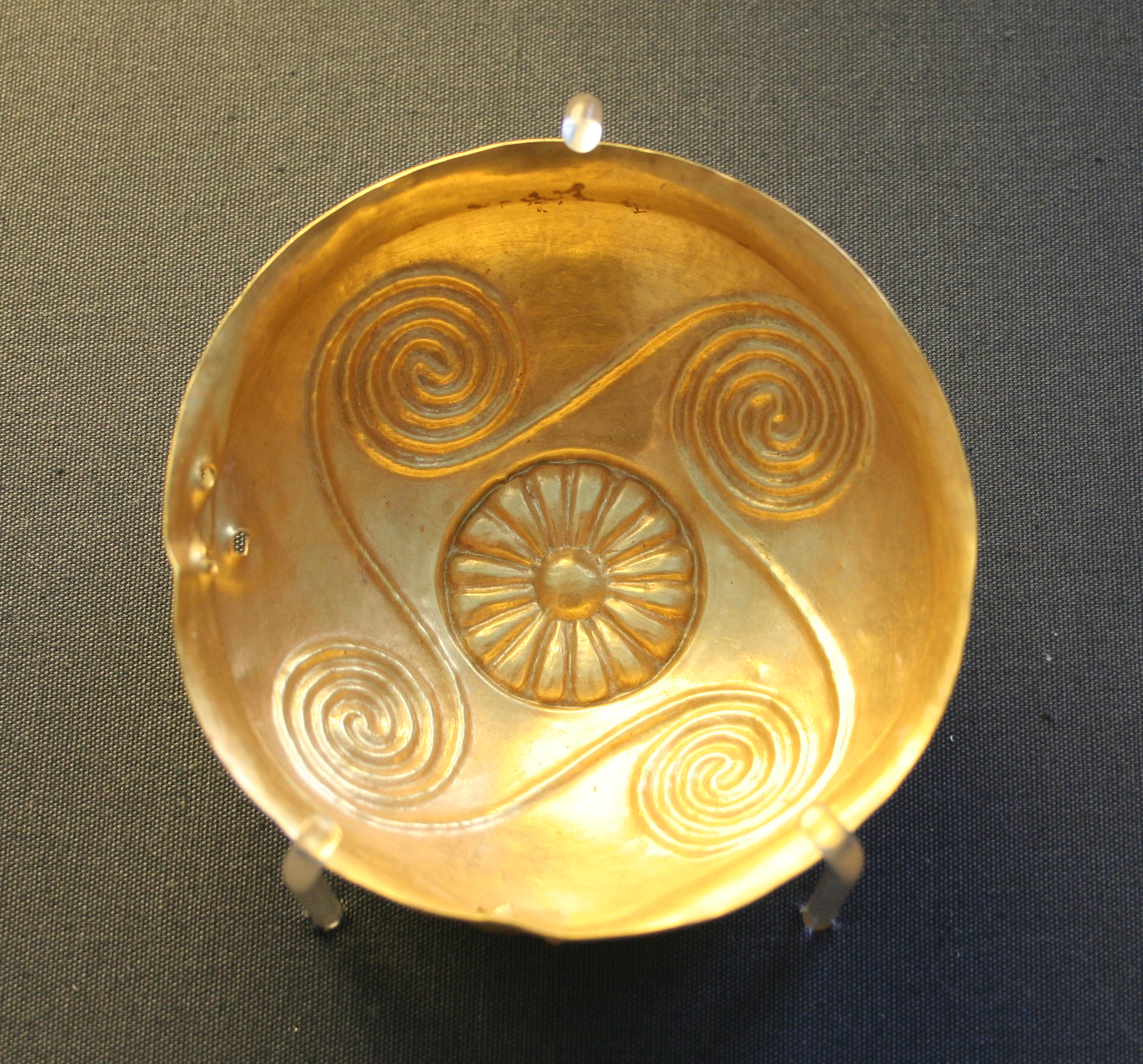
Embossed gold cup with a rosette and spirals

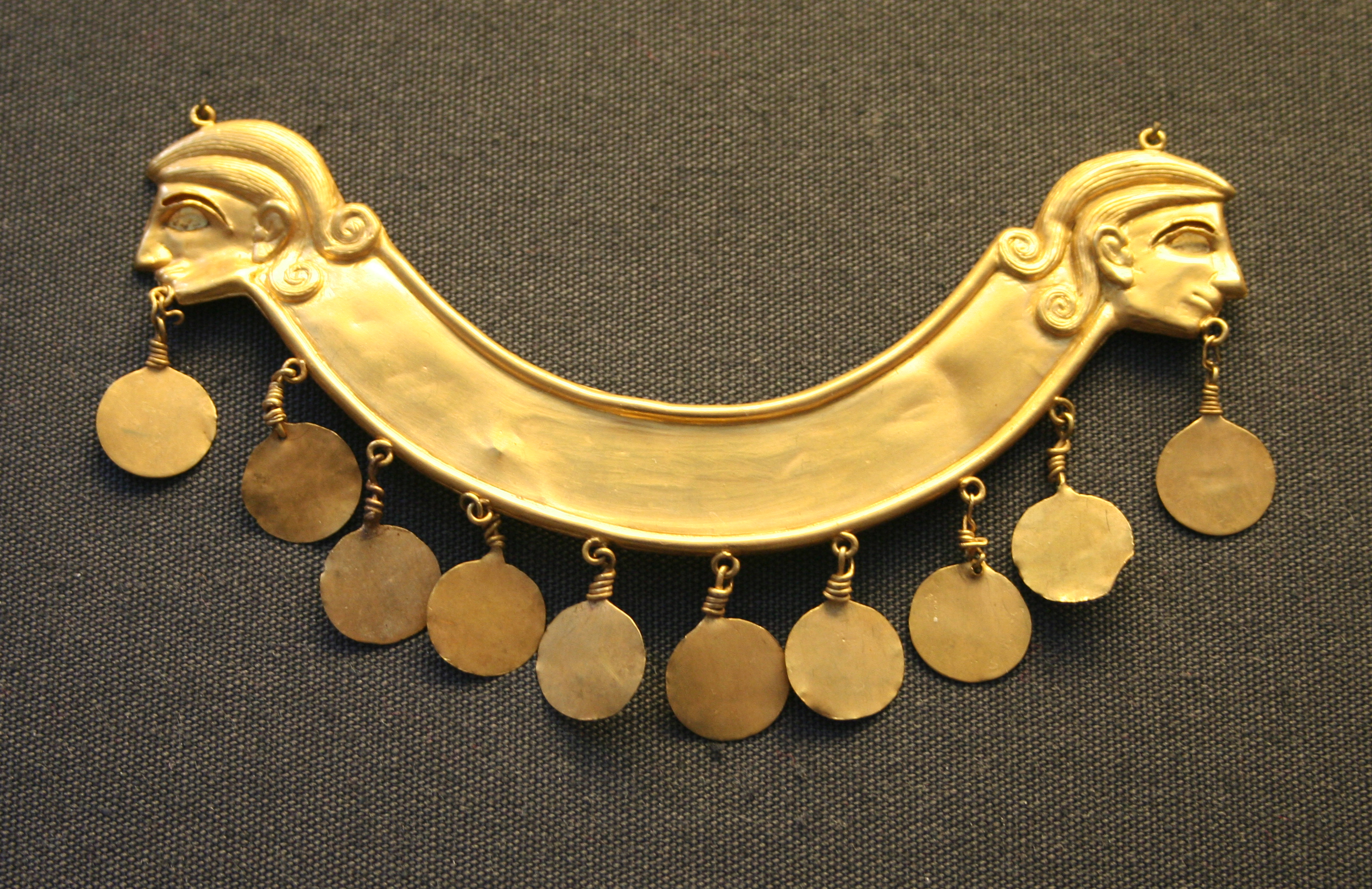
Elongated breast ornament with human heads at both ends

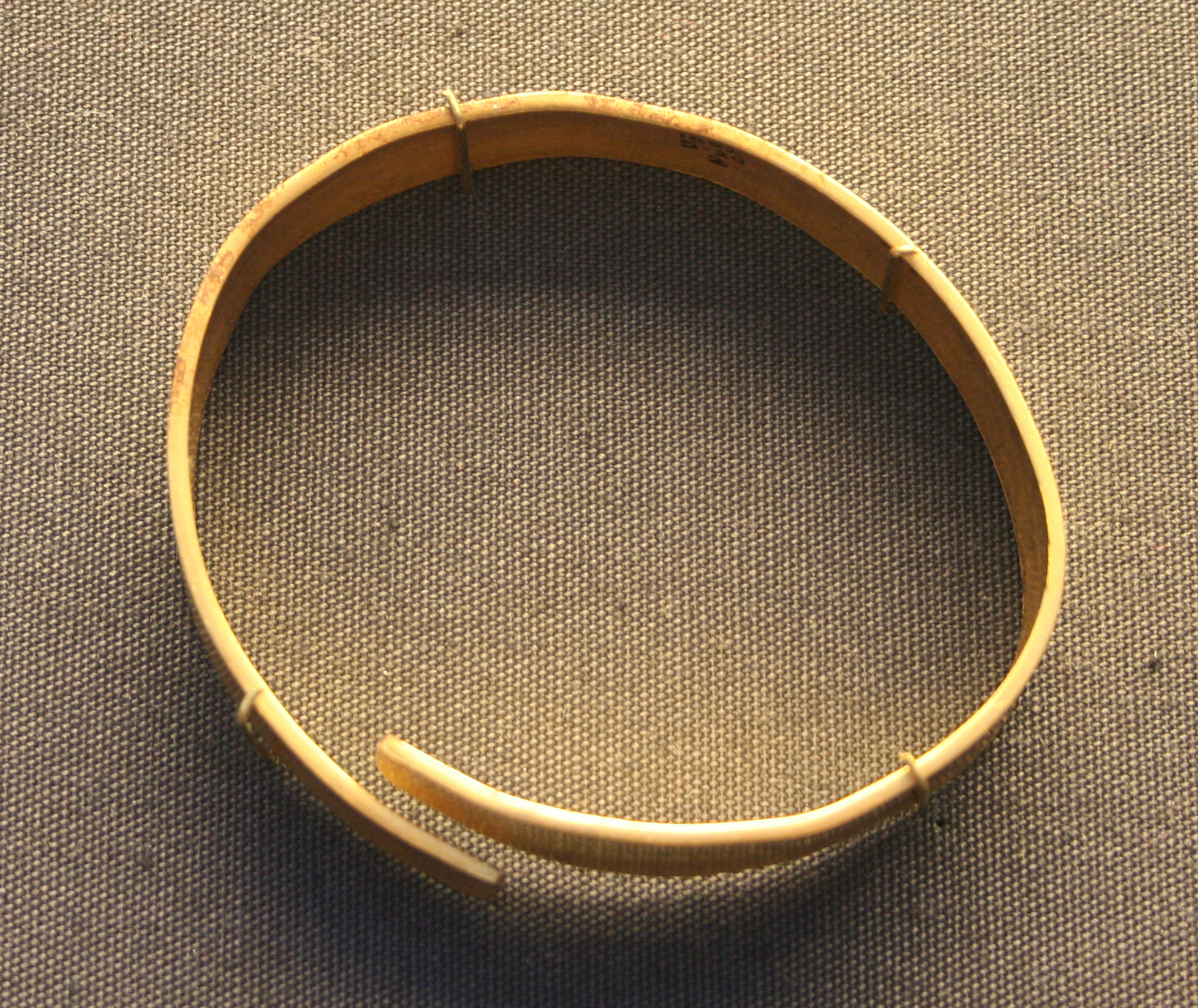
Heavy gold bracelet

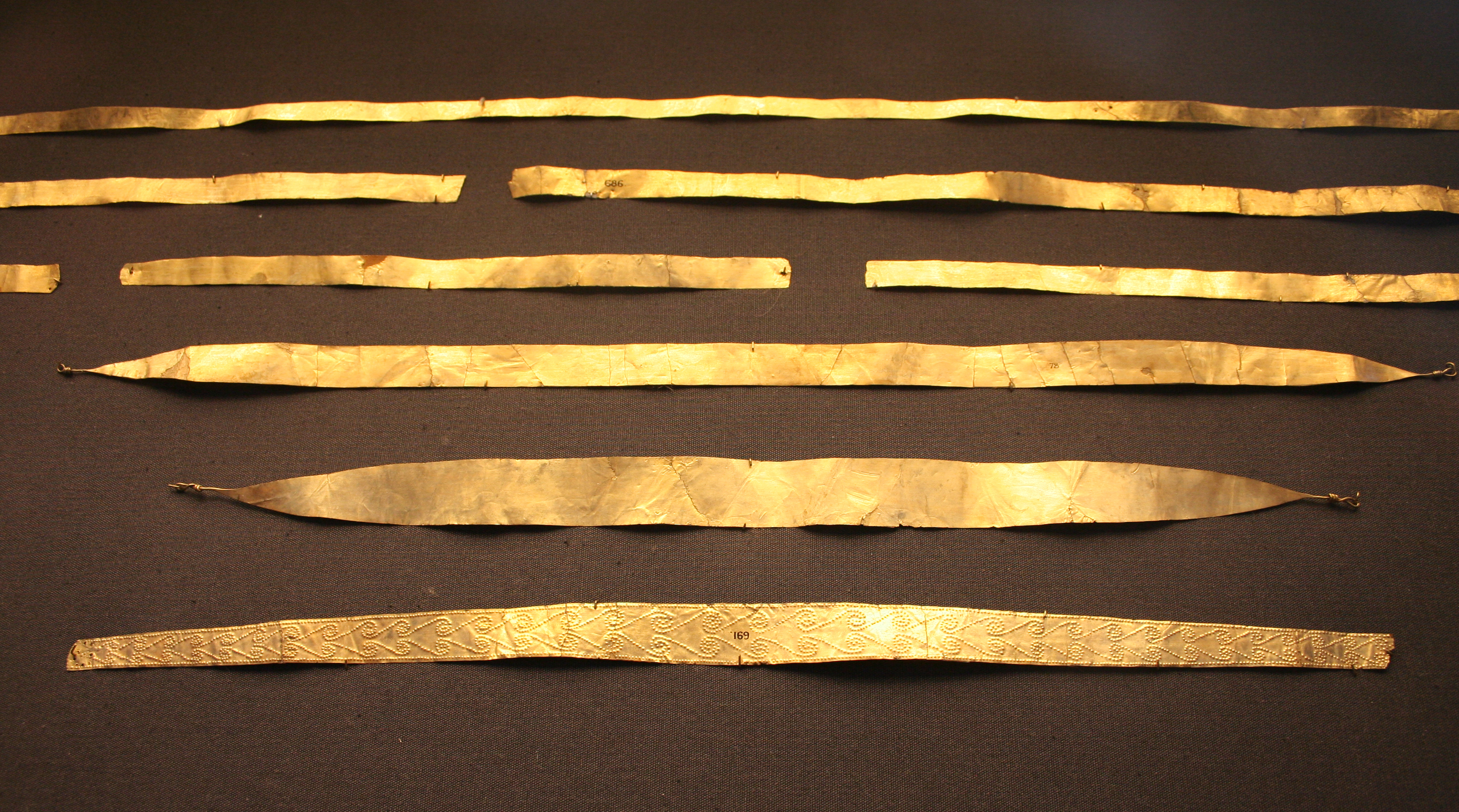
Several gold bands and diadems

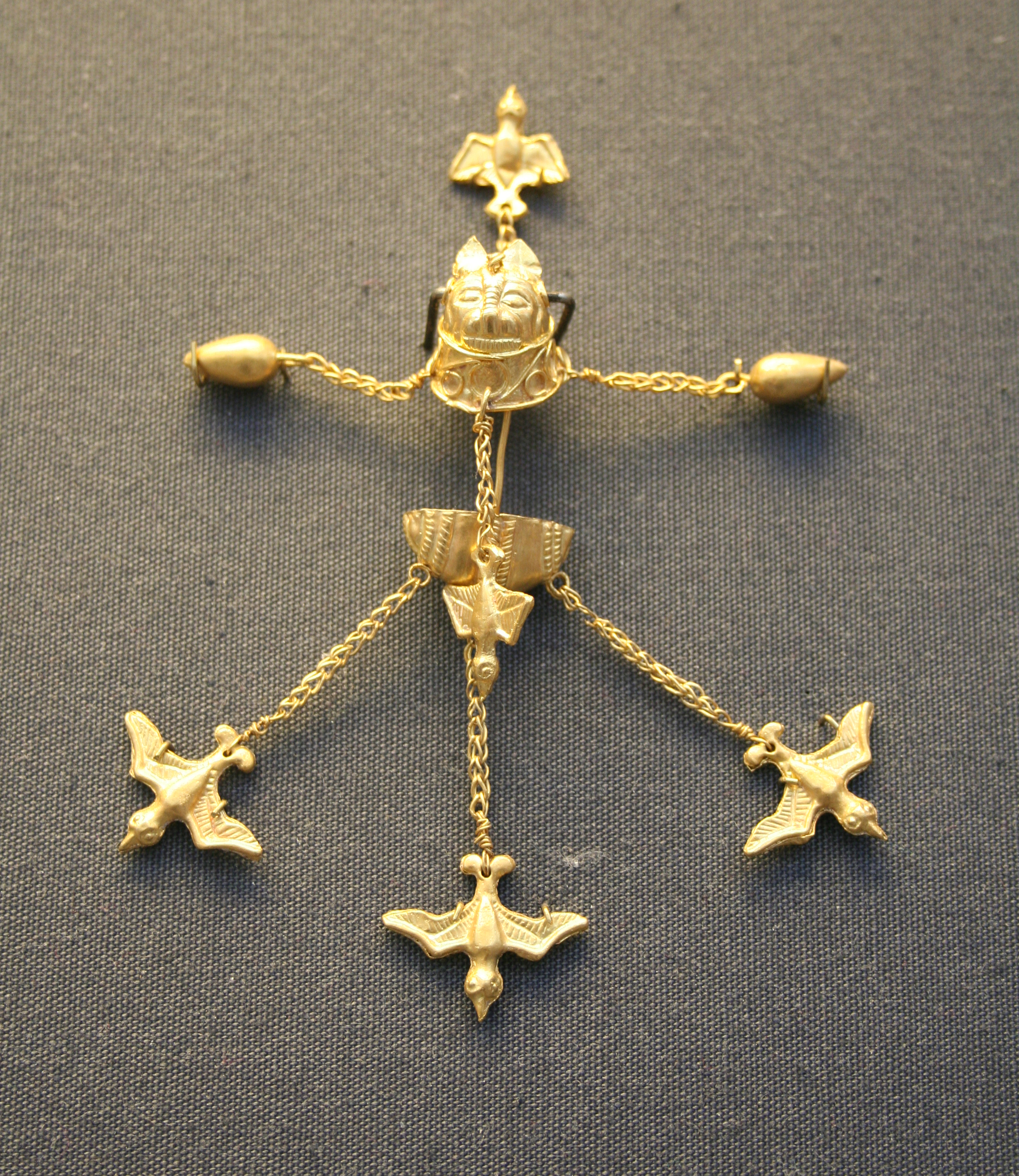
Gold ornament based on a lions head

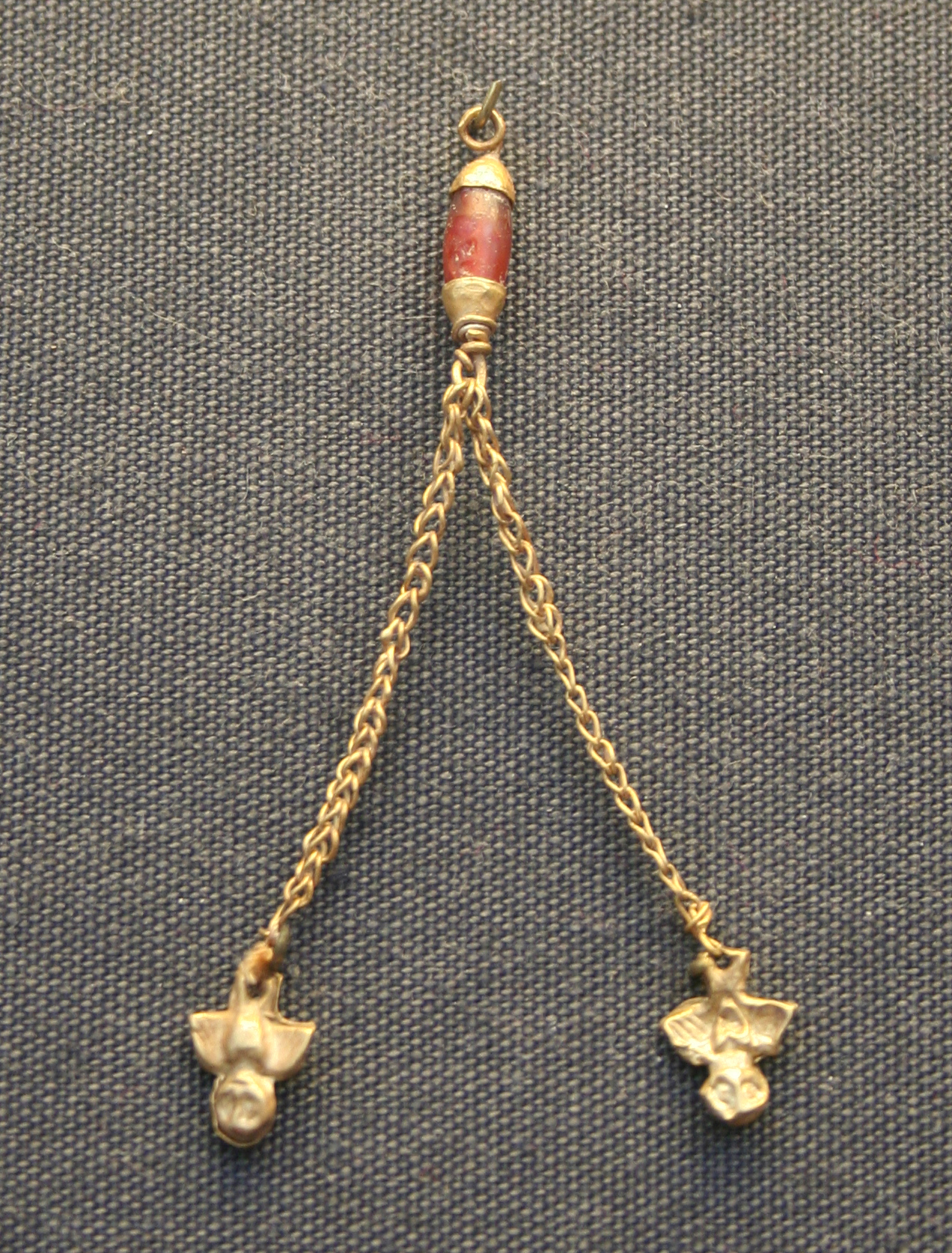
Gold ornament with two chains ending in owl figurines

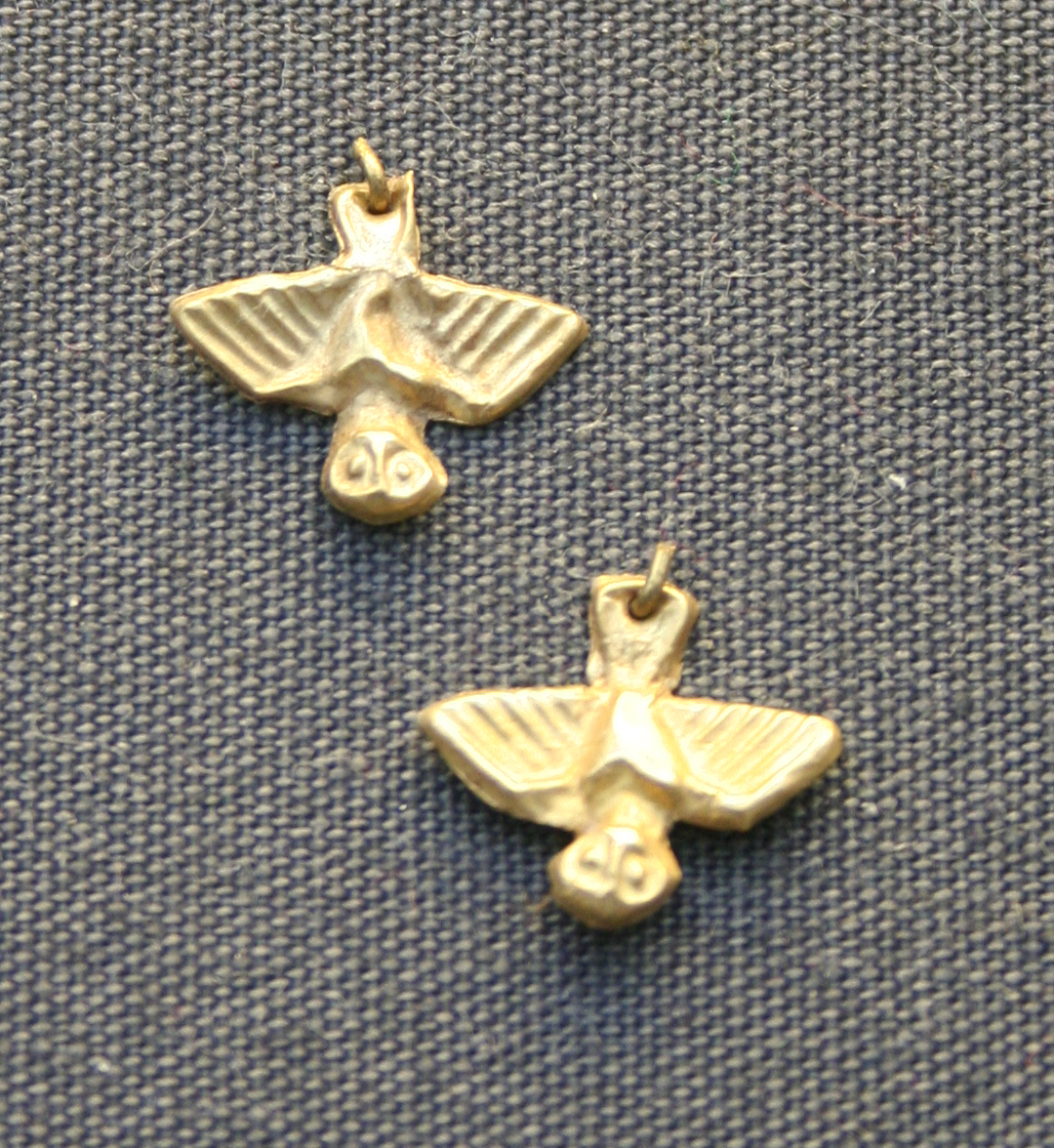
Gold pendants in the shape of owls

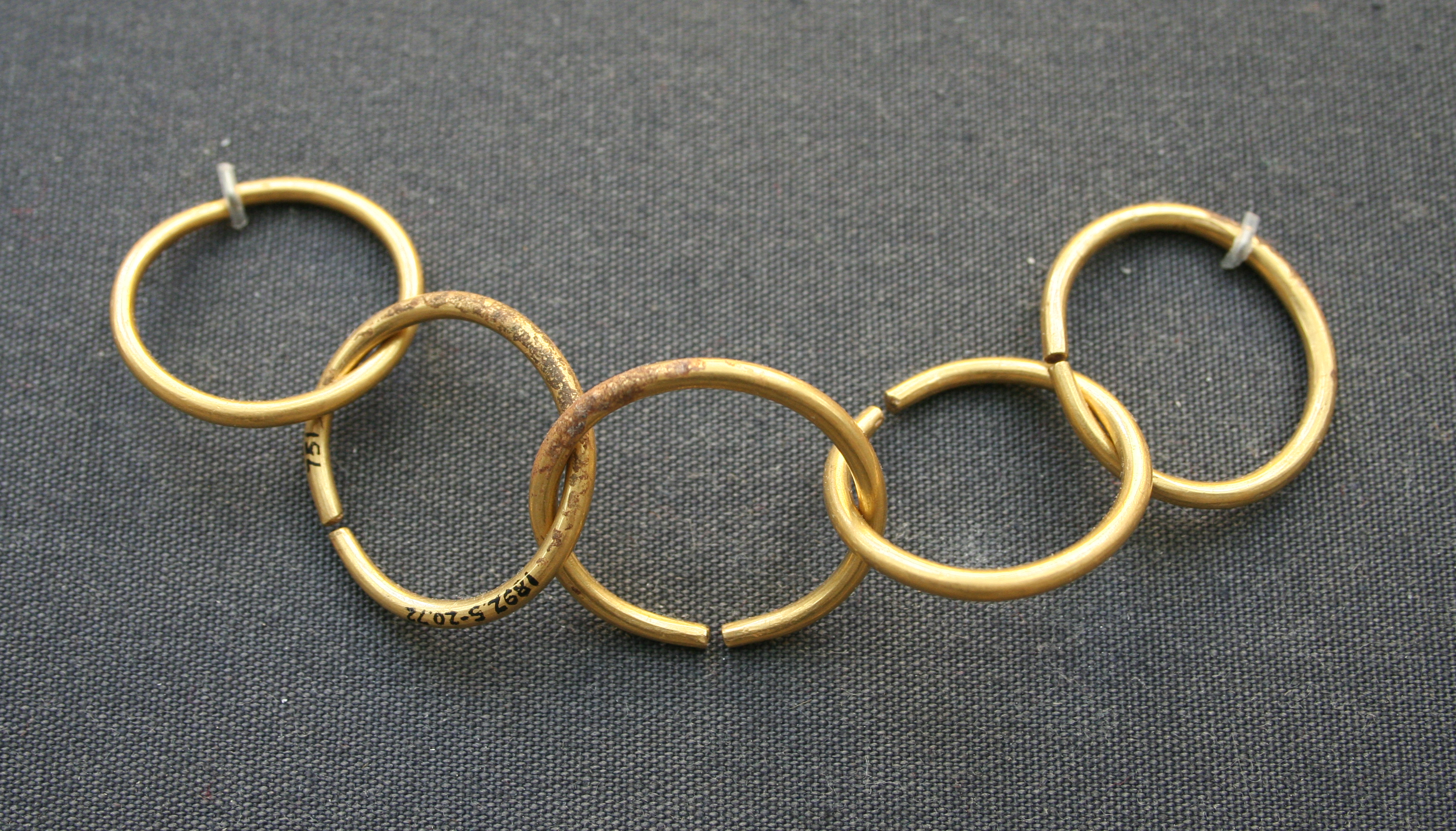
Five interconnecting golden rings

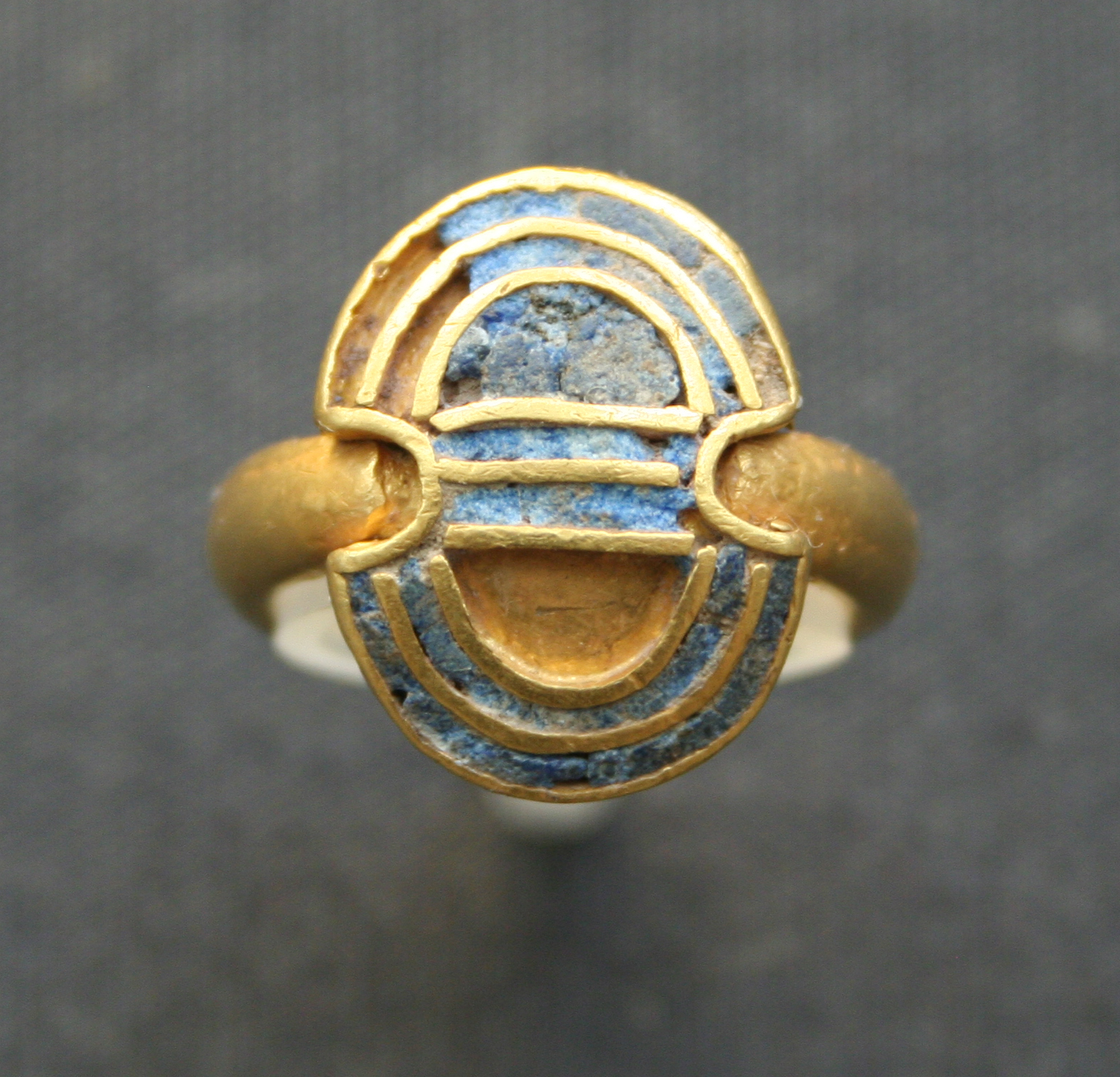
Gold finger ring with lapis lazuli inlays in the shape of a double axe

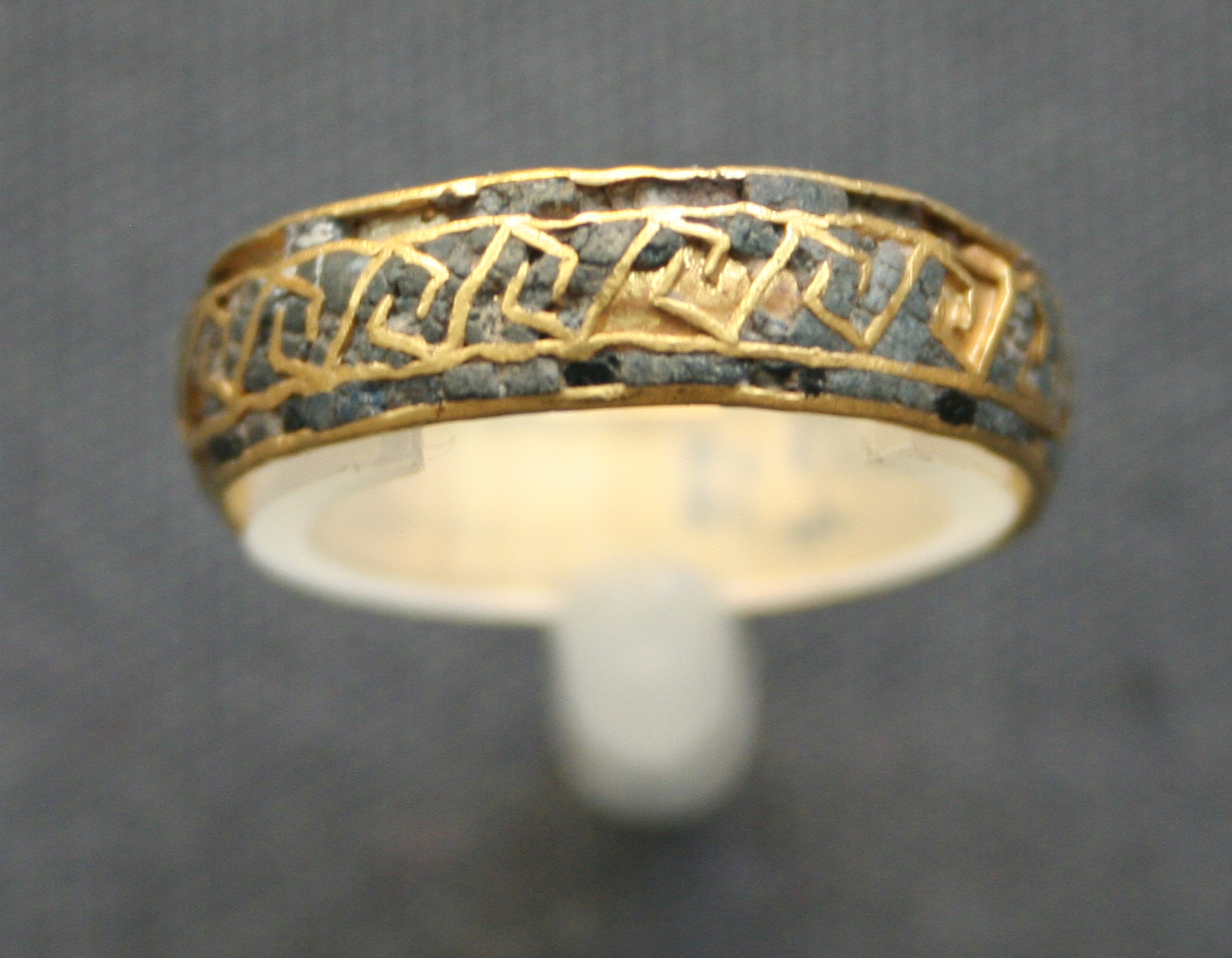
Finger ring inlaid with lapis lazuli

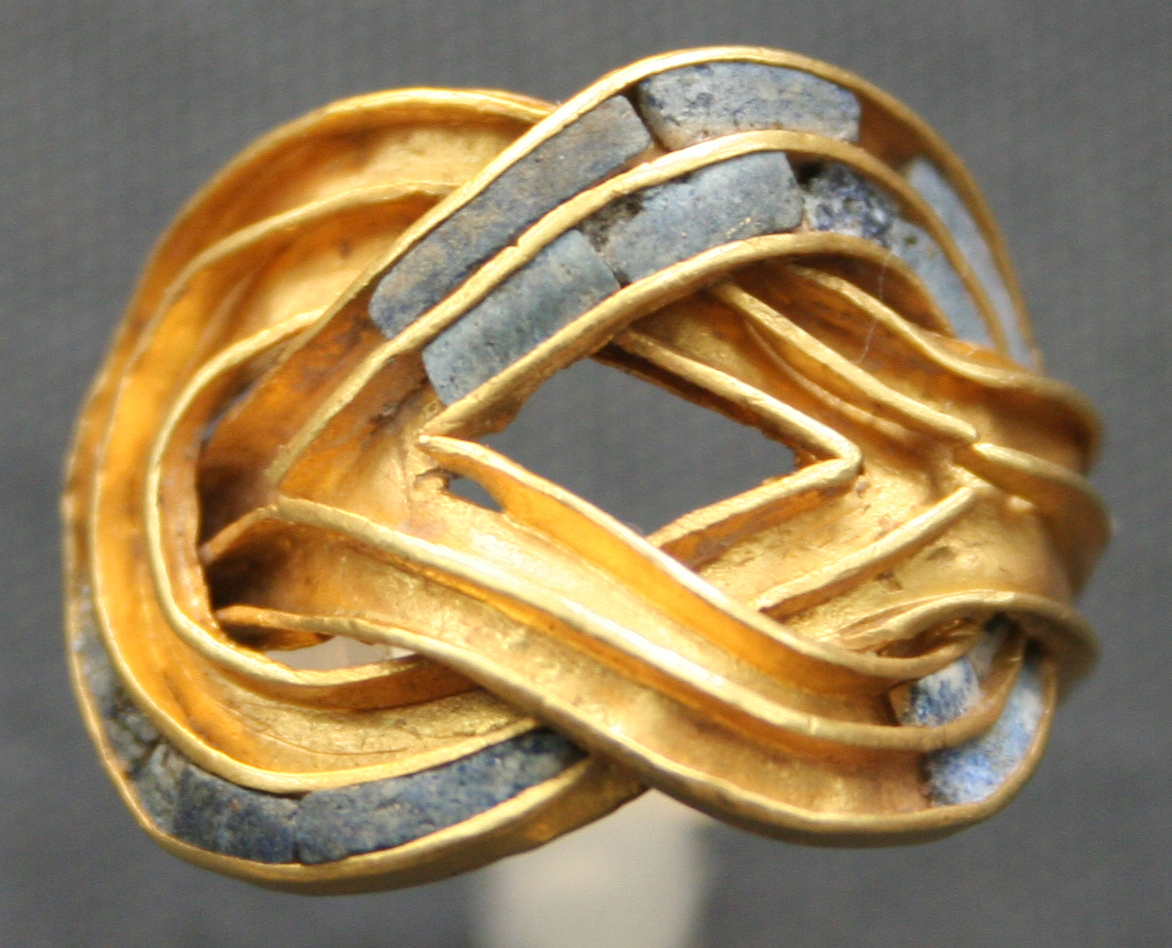
Gold finger ring in the shape of a reef knot

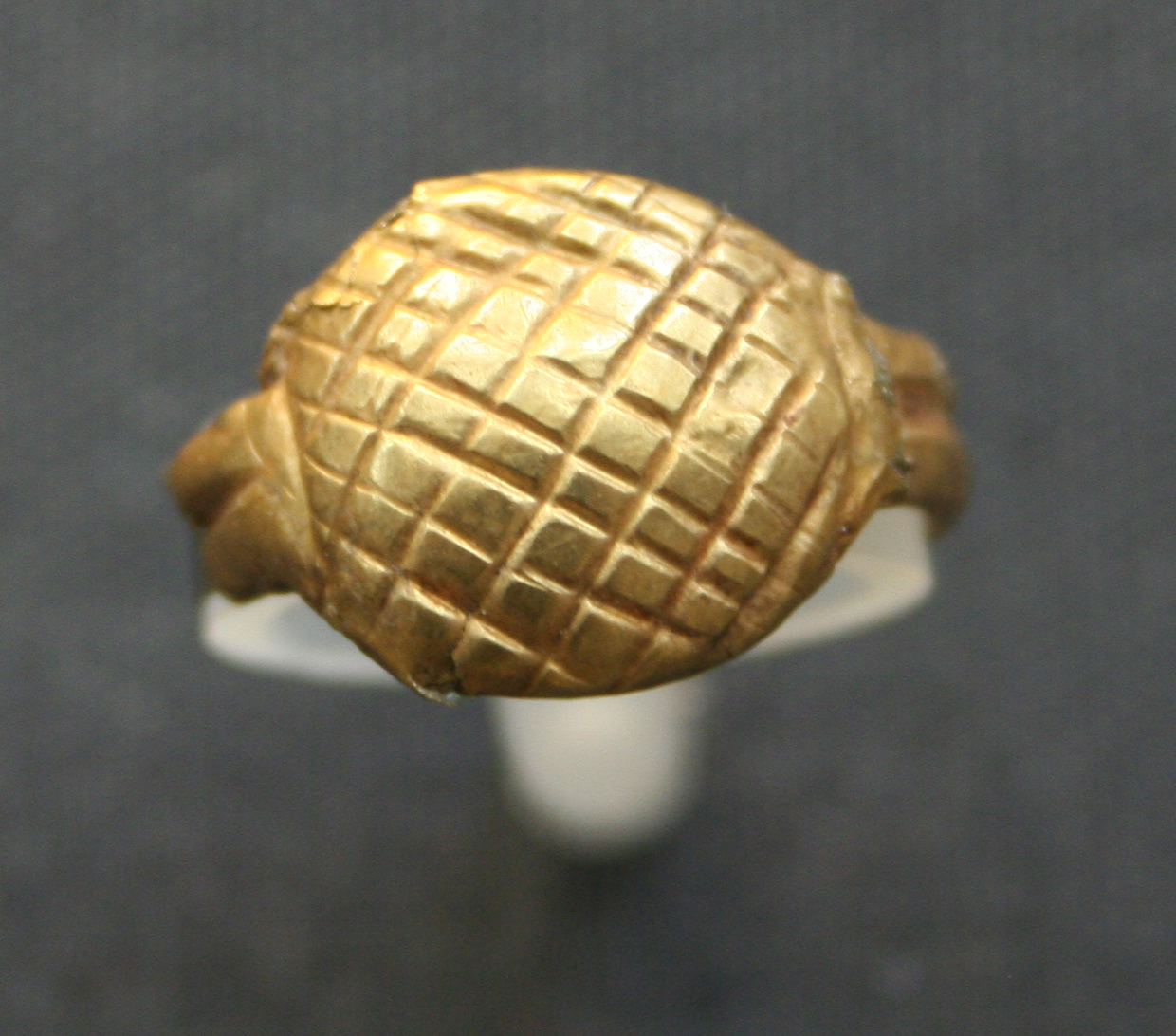
Ring decorated with cross hatched lines

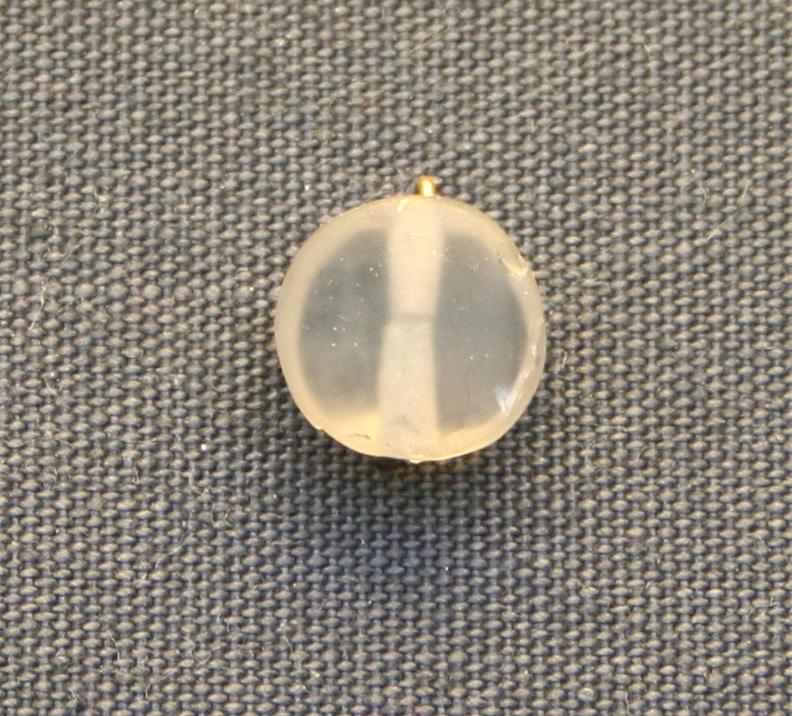
Disk bead made from rock crystal

== Bibliography ==
- L. Burn, The British Museum Book of Greek and Roman Art (British Museum Press, 1991)
- Castleden, Rodney, Minoans: Life in Bronze Age Crete, 2002, Taylor & Francis, ISBN 9781134880645, google books
- R. Higgins, The Aegina Treasure - An Archaeological Mystery (London, 1979)
- R. Higgins, 'The Aegina treasure reconsidered', Annual of the British School-1, 52 (1957), pp. 42–57
- Hood, Sinclair, The Arts in Prehistoric Greece, 1978, Penguin (Penguin/Yale History of Art), ISBN 0140561420
