= Chryssolakkos =

Coordinates: 35°17′53″N 25°29′36″E

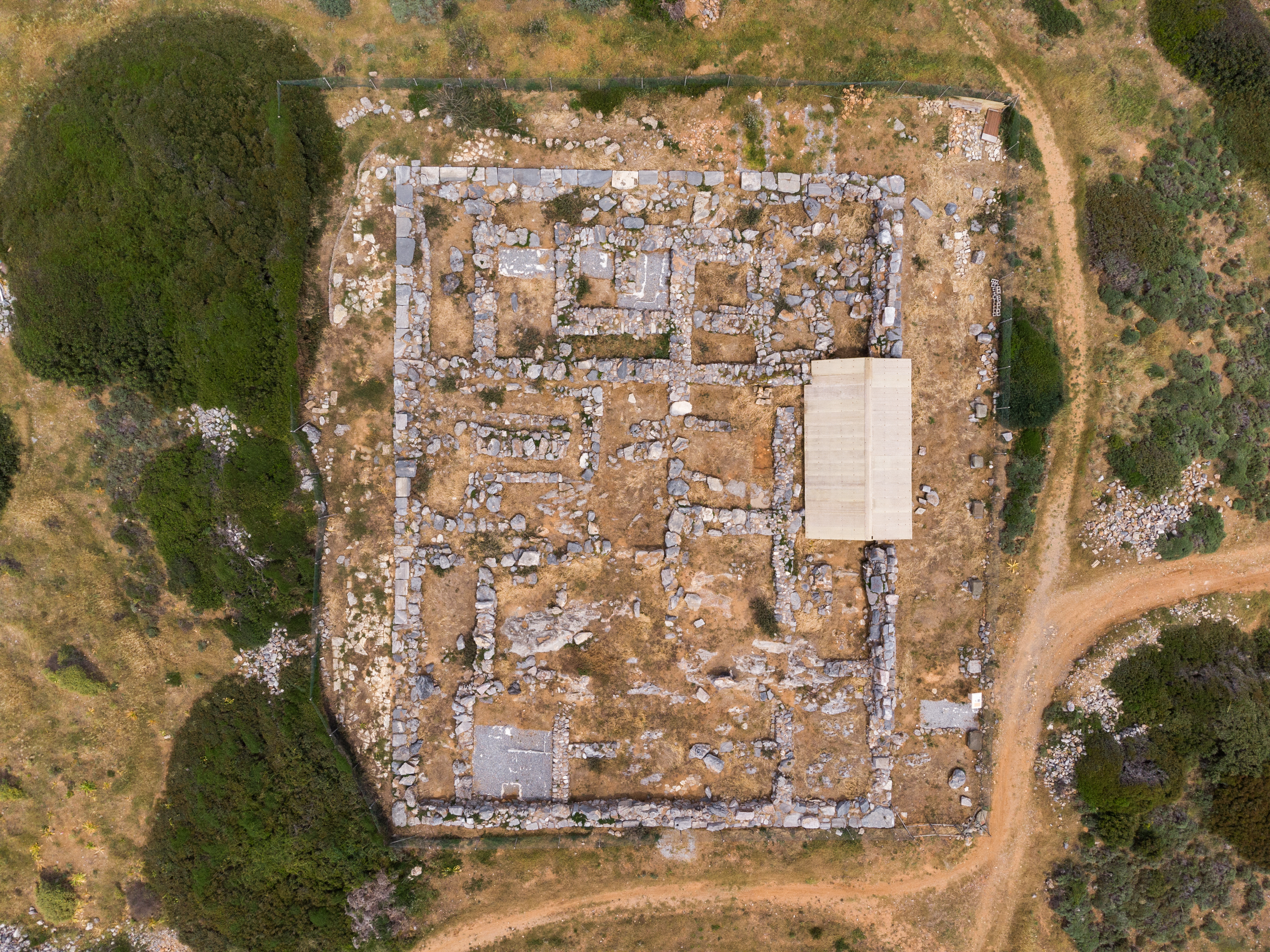
Aerial view of the necropolis of Chrysolakkos

Chryssolakkos means the "pit of gold". This is where the ancient necropolis (royal burial enclosure or cemetery, 1700 BCE) in Malia, an ancient Minoan town in Crete, Greece, is located. As well as the famous Malia Pendant, it is commonly thought that the so-called Aegina Treasure of Minoan jewellery in the British Museum was excavated here by local people in the 19th century.

The Malia Pendant, on display at the Heraklion Archaeological Museum as of 2020, was found here and is of high quality goldsmithery of the Minoan times. The jewel takes the form of two insects, which are identical (mirror images) joined head-to-head with the tips of their abdomens almost touching in a symmetrical or heraldic arrangement. The insects’ wings spread backwards. From the lower edges of the wings and a point close to the tip of the abdomen dangle three discs. With their legs, the insects are "grasping" a centrally placed circular disc and there is a second, smaller, smooth globule placed above this and between the insects' heads as if they were eating it. Regiscolia maculata, a wasp, was proposed as the model for the insects, and the fruits of a native Cretan herb Tordylium apulum as a model for the three discs that are suspended from the pendant, though most scholars are happy to regard them as bees, perhaps over a honeycomb.
