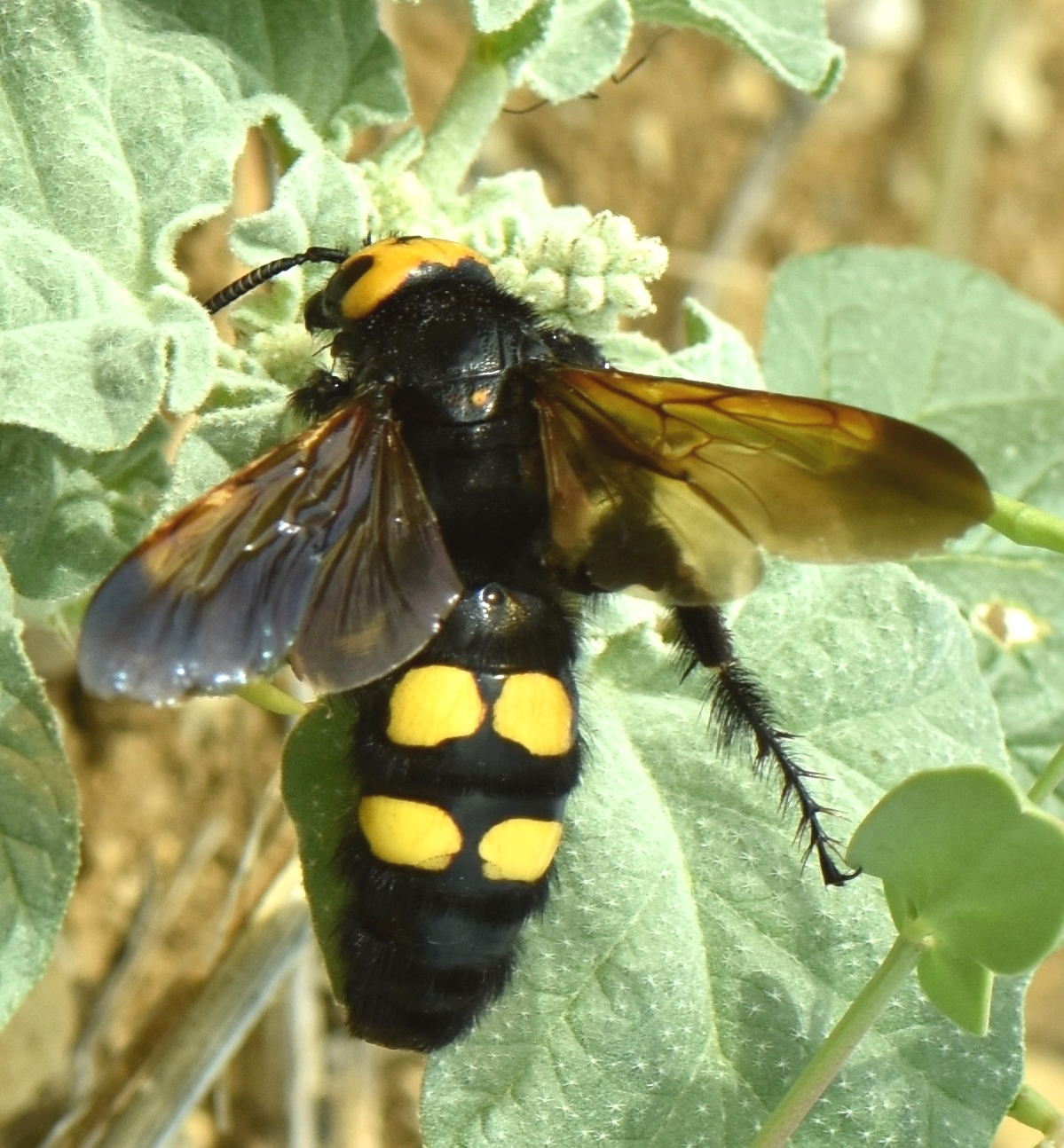
- Regiscolia maculata flavifrons in Spain. The subspecies has black setae on the abdomen.

Scientific classification
- Kingdom: Animalia
- Phylum: Arthropoda
- Clade: Pancrustacea
- Class: Insecta
- Order: Hymenoptera
- Family: Scoliidae
- Genus: Regiscolia
- Species: R. maculata

Binomial name
- Regiscolia maculata (Drury, 1773)

Subspecies
- Regiscolia maculata bischoffi (Micha, 1927); Regiscolia maculata flavifrons (Fabricius, 1775); Regiscolia maculata maculata (Drury, 1773)

Synonyms
- Sphex maculata Drury, 1773; Triscolia haemorrhoidalis Fabricius, 1787; Scolia flavifrons Fabricius, 1775; Triscolia barbara Micha, 1927; Megascolia maculata (Drury, 1773)

= Regiscolia maculata =

Species of wasp

Regiscolia maculata, sometimes known as the mammoth wasp, (Note: This name may also be used to refer to any member of the family Scoliidae.) is a species of wasp belonging to the family Scoliidae in the order Hymenoptera. It is a parasitoid on scarab beetles and is found in Europe and Asia and is the largest wasp found in Europe. In central Europe they fly from June to about mid-July.

== Description ==
The mammoth wasp resembles a very large, elongated bumble bee. The female is larger than the male and has a yellow head, the male has a black head. Its body is covered in downy hair and is glossy black in colour with two yellow bands across its abdomen which are sometimes divided to form four yellow spots. Females have shorter antennae than males. The females may reach a length of 4.5 cm (1.8 in) and the males are smaller than the females. It may be confused with Scolia hirta which is however smaller, and has a black head.

== Distribution ==
The mammoth wasp occurs in southern Europe as far north as Belgium, where it was first recorded in 2018, into Russia, North Africa and the near east. It has been recorded in southern Great Britain but as its prey does not occur in Britain it will be unable to establish there.

== Habitat ==
The mammoth wasp is found in Mediterranean type habitats such as oak forests, maquis and garrigue. It can only occur where its prey, the European rhinoceros beetle Oryctes nasicornis, is found too and in Russia it has been noted that it is commonest around human habitation where manure piles, sawmills and compost heaps provide habitat for its prey.

== Biology ==
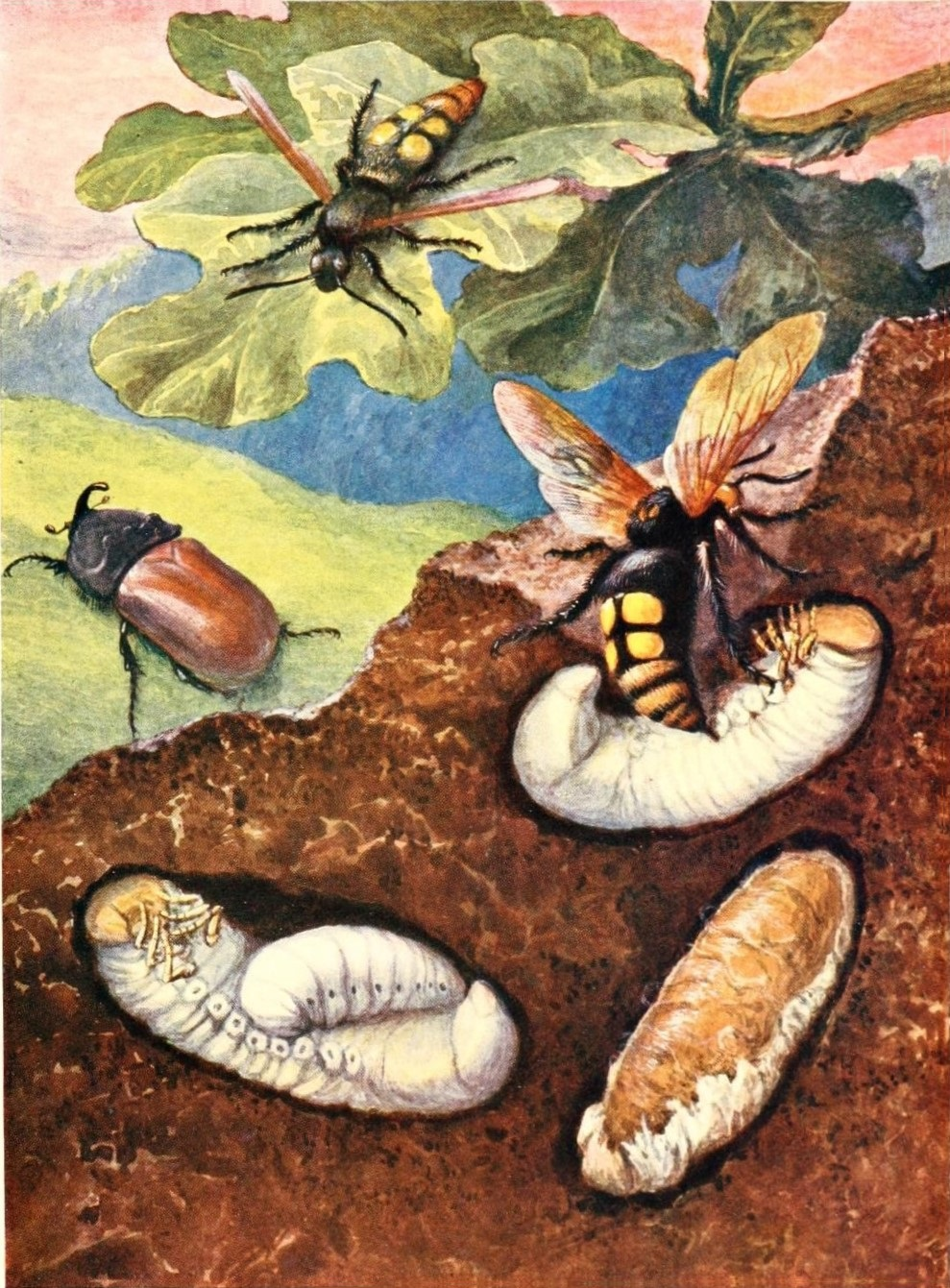
Illustration of a female ovipositing on a beetle larva

The adult mammoth wasps feed on nectar from flowers. In Malta they have been associated with wild artichoke and Carpobrotus edulis. The female hunts in dead wood for the grubs of the European rhinoceros beetle which it paralyses by stinging it and then lays a single egg on the larva. The larval wasp consumes the beetle larva apart from its skin. Once the beetle larva had been consumed the wasp larva builds a cocoon and pupates, emerging from the cocoon as an adult in the following spring. Males emerge before females.

The European rhinoceros beetle is the primary host for the mammoth wasp but it will also lay eggs on the larvae of other beetles in the Scarabaeoidea including Polyphylla fullo, Anoxia orientalis, the European or greater stag beetle (Lucanus cervus) and Pentodon idiota.

== In culture ==
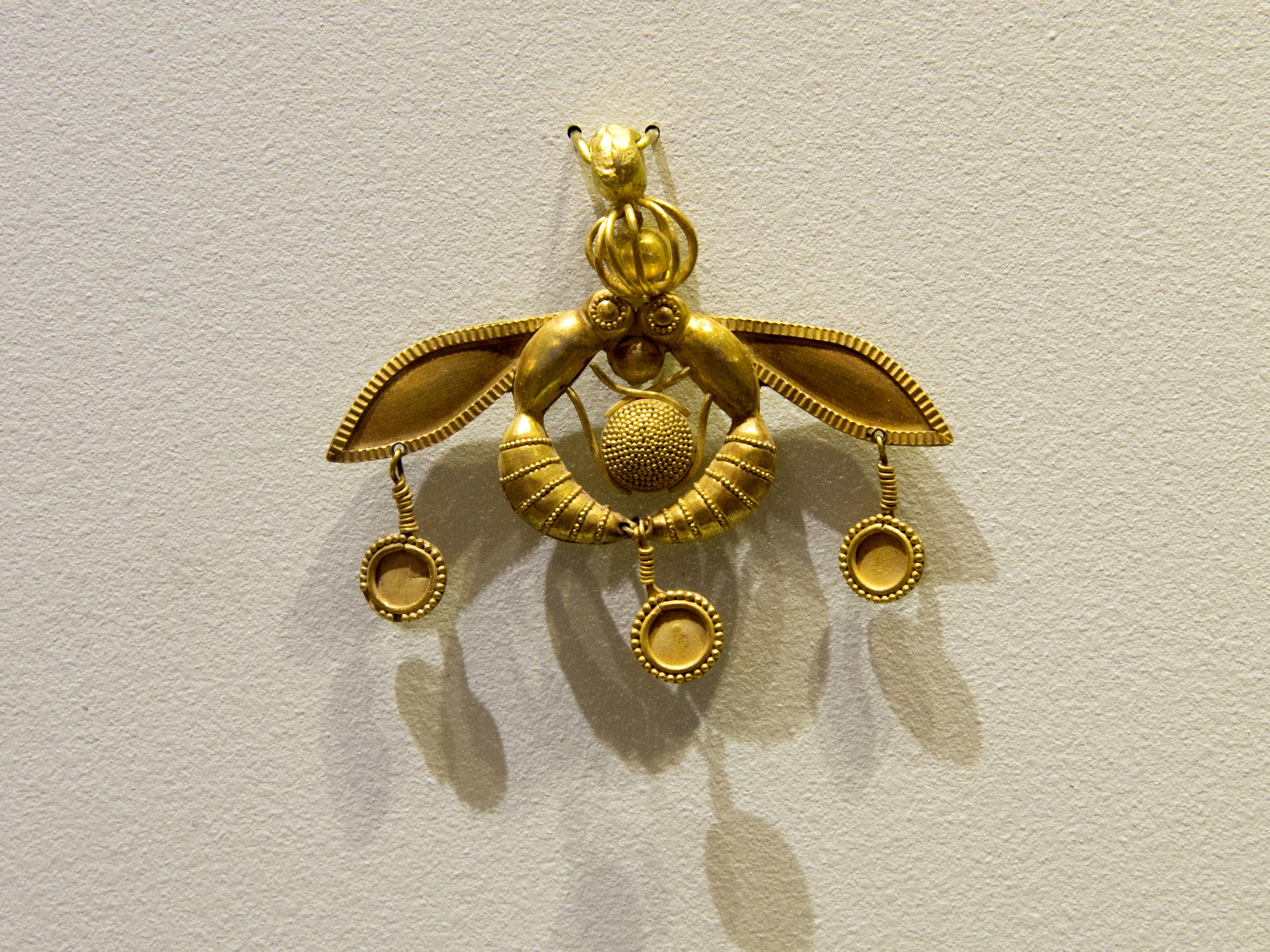
Malia pendant, gold ornament from the Chrysolakos necropolis near Malia, 1800-1700 BC, AMH, 144879

It is suggested as the insect model used for the gold "Malia Pendant", a jewel of high quality gold-smithery of the Minoan times.

== Gallery ==
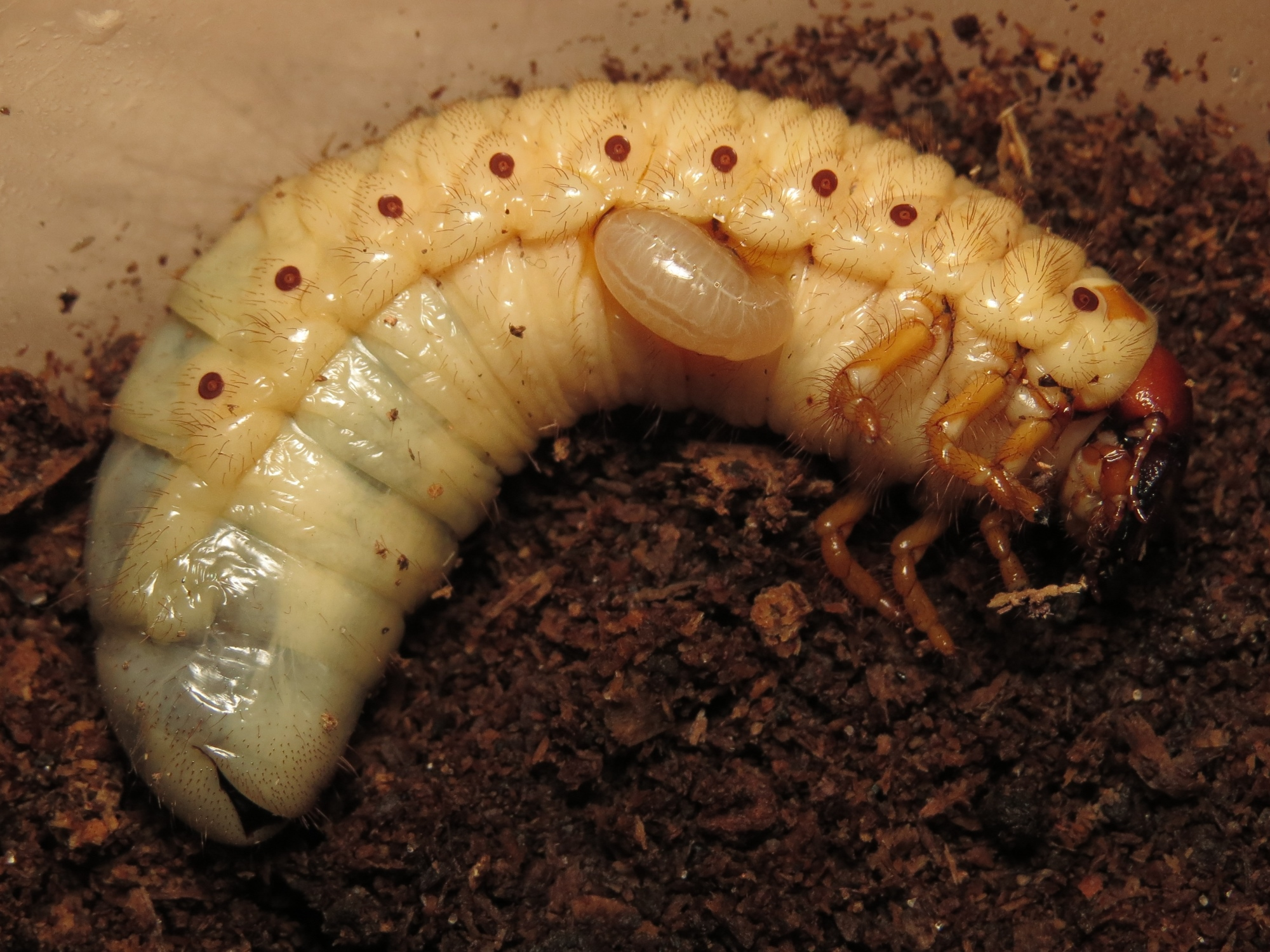
Larval Regiscolia maculata feeding on an Oryctes nasicornis larva

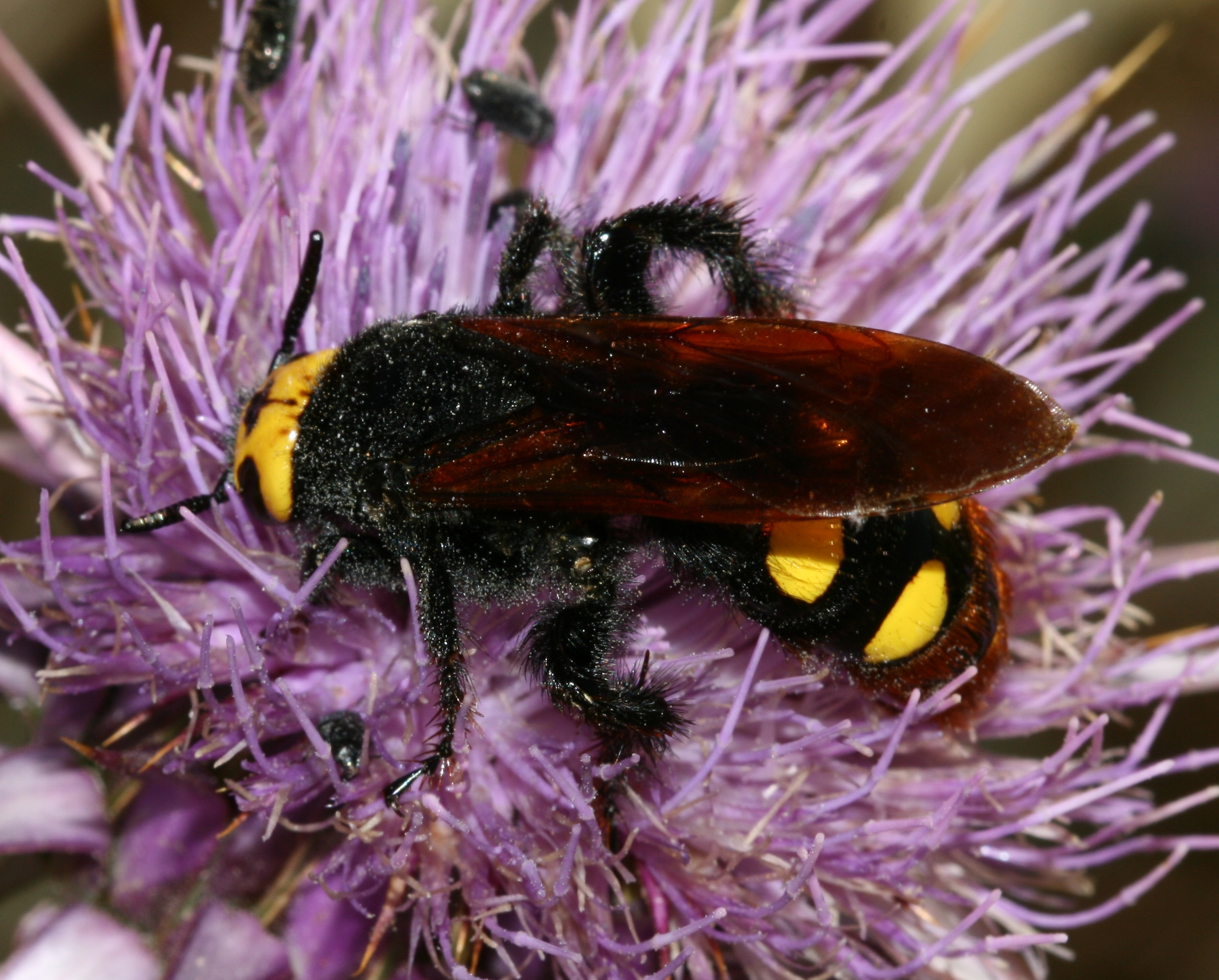
R. maculata bischoffi, a subspecies endemic to Cyprus

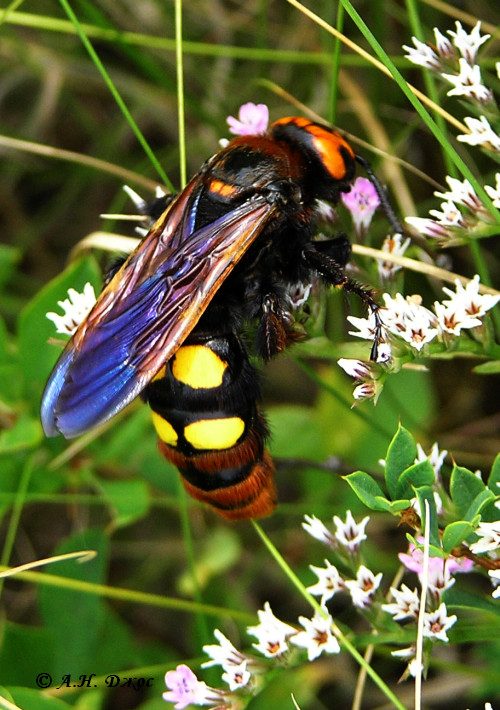
Female R. maculata maculata with rusty red setae on the abdomen
