= Malia Pendant =

Minoan artefact

- Χρυσό κόσμημα των Μαλίων
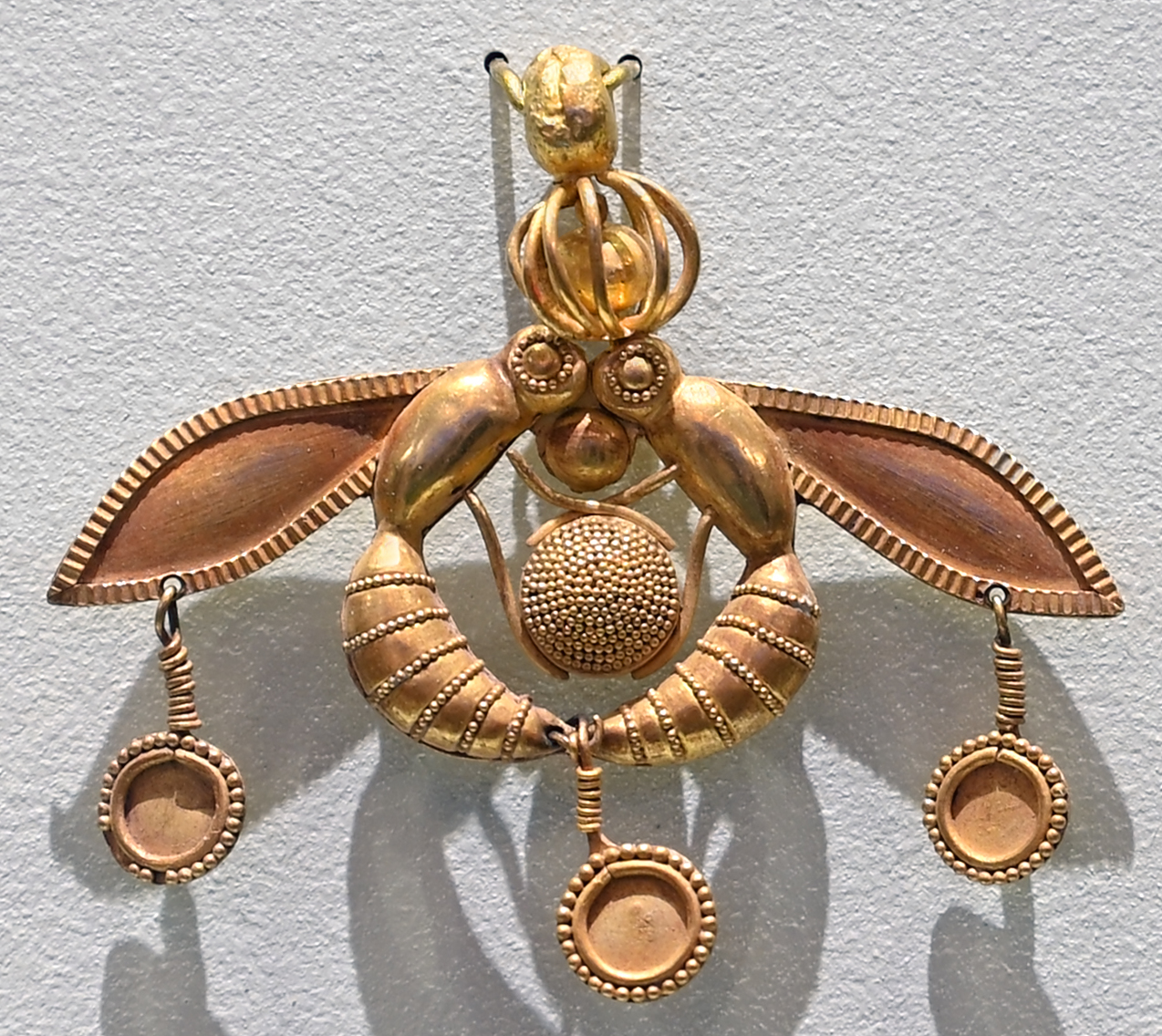
- Material: Gold
- Height: 4.6 centimetres (1.8 in)
- Width: 4.4 centimetres (1.7 in)
- Created: c. 1700 BC
- Discovered: 1930; Chrysolakkos, Malia, Crete, Greece
- Present location: Heraklion Archaeological Museum, Crete, Greece

The Malia Pendant is a gold pendant found in a tomb in 1930 at Chrysolakkos, Malia, Crete. It dates to the Protopalatial period of the Minoan civilization, 1800-1650 BC. The pendant was excavated by French archaeologists and was first described by Pierre Demargne. The pendant is commonly called "The Bees of Malia."

The pendant, which may have originally been part of a necklace, earring, or pin, takes the form of two insects, which are identical (mirror images) joined head-to-head with the tips of their abdomens almost touching in a symmetrical or heraldic arrangement. The insects’ wings spread backwards. From the lower edges of the wings and a point close to the tip of the abdomen dangle three discs. With their legs, the insects are "grasping" a centrally placed circular disc and there is a second, smaller, smooth globule placed above this and between the insects' heads as if they were eating it. The Malia Pendant is on display at the Heraklion Archaeological Museum, on the island of Crete in Greece. It is probably the single most famous piece of Minoan jewellery.

== Identity of the insects ==
The insects resemble wasps or bees. The belief that the pendant displays bees is the reason the pendant is also known as the “bee pendant”. One paper states that the insects are not bees, but definitely from the wider grouping of Hymenoptera. It has been proposed that the goldsmith used the mammoth wasp Regiscolia maculata as the model. For the three suspending discs, a plant is proposed as the model, and in particular the fruits of Tordylium apulum. Archaeologists point out that Minoan art often distorts forms for artistic effect. The insects also resemble the way in which the Egyptians, with whom the Minoans share many artistic conventions, portray bees, with an elongated thorax and abdomen much like wasps.

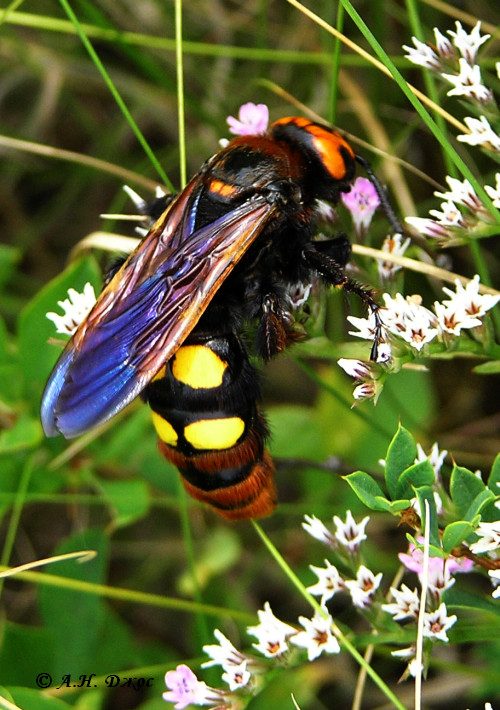
Regiscolia maculata browsing flowers

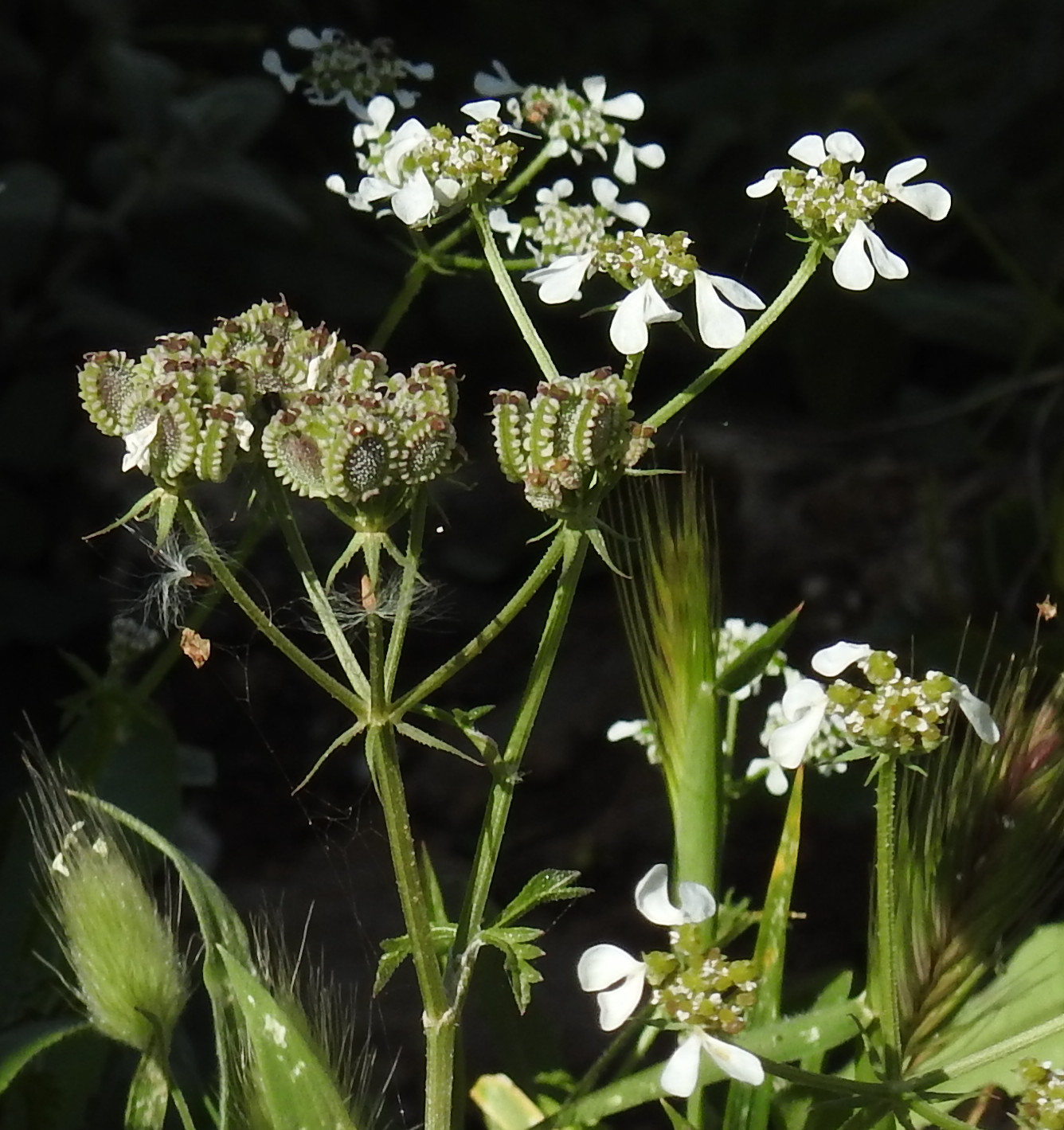
Tordylium apulum with immature fruits (left)

Thematically, the presence of honey is significant, since it was important in Minoan culture. According to archive tablets found at Knossos, offerings of honey were made to the goddess Eleuthia. The kernos (offering table) in the temple at Malia was used to offer small amounts of grains and other farm produce, including honey, to the deity. Honey also had a presence in Minoan perceptions of the afterlife, with some objects from tombs resembling or including honeycomb imagery. The Malia Pendant, assuming the insects are bees, would then depict an abbreviated version of the production cycle of honey. Bees were also important in the Minoan economy. The honey produced was the Minoan’s main source of sugar, and provided them with a food source with a high nutritional index. Honey may also have been used as an additive to alcoholic drinks such as mulled wine, making honey important to several aspects of life within Minoan culture.

Insects, bees in particular, also carried a particular symbolism within the Minoan religion. Much like Egyptian religion, albeit with the sun as a symbol rather than insects, Minoan religion contains an emphasis on renewal, leading to a fascination with the life cycle of insects as their growth is made tangible not through growth in size but through their changes in form. With insects, the continuation of the cycle of life and death is performed through regeneration, a concept important to the Minoan belief system. Bees were also an attribute or symbol of a Minoan goddess, referencing her role in regeneration. Bees’ habit of swarming as well as their production of honey also contributed to their use as a symbol, such as in the Malia Pendant.
