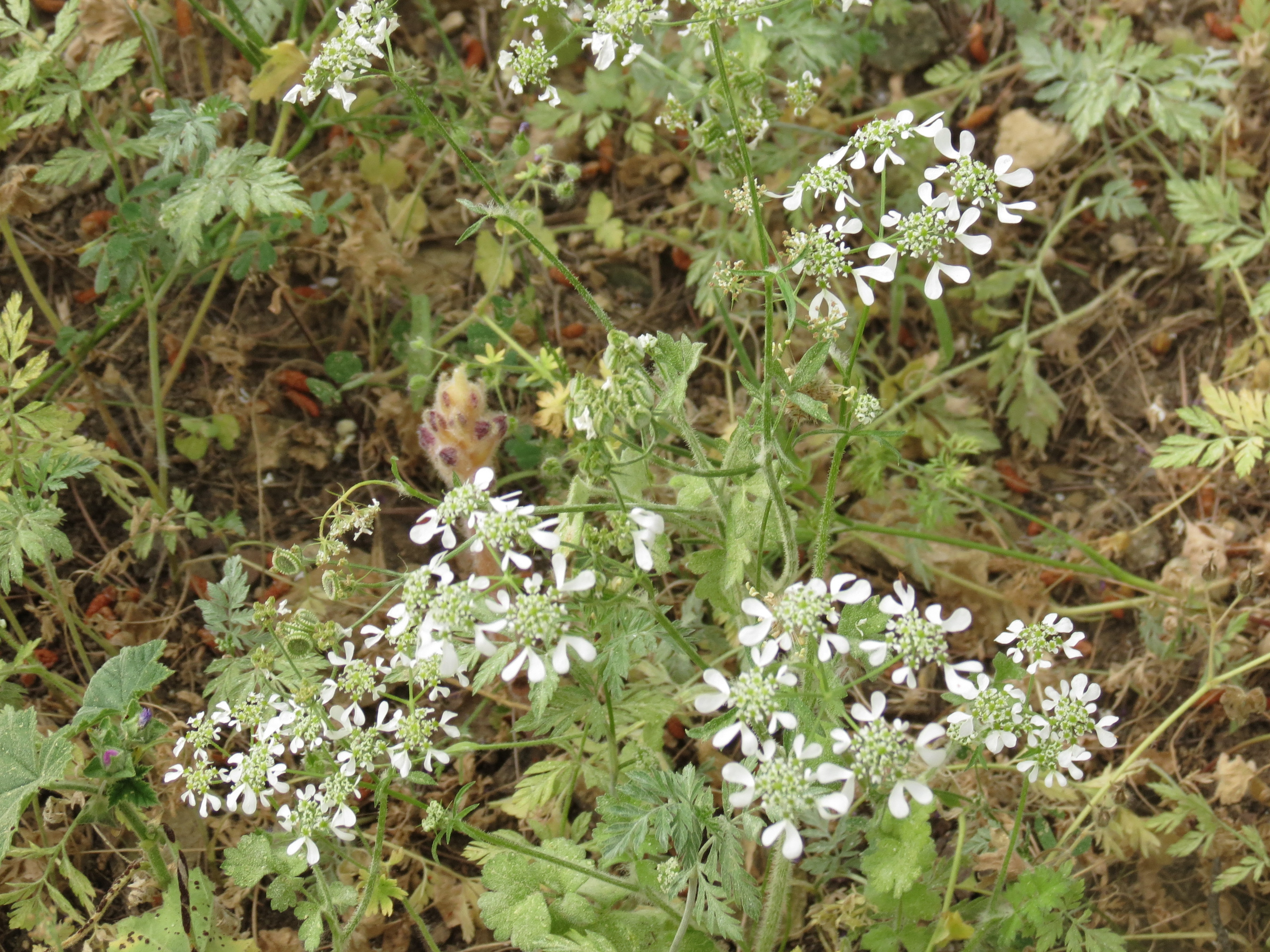

Scientific classification
- Kingdom: Plantae
- Clade: Tracheophytes
- Clade: Angiosperms
- Clade: Eudicots
- Clade: Asterids
- Order: Apiales
- Family: Apiaceae
- Genus: Tordylium
- Species: T. apulum

Binomial name
- Tordylium apulum L.

= Tordylium apulum =

Species of herb

Tordylium apulum, commonly known as the Mediterranean hartwort, is an annual forb or herb. It is classified within the family Apiaceae, the carrot family. It is native to Europe and Western Asia, but has been introduced to the United States, where it is now found only in Arizona. This plant's seeds are suggested as the plant model used for the famous gold "Malia Pendant", a jewel of high quality gold-smithery of the Minoan times now on display at the Heraklion Archaeological Museum.

== Derivation of English Common Name ==
The name Hartwort, meaning ‘Deer plant’ is a scholarly coinage from the belief, first recorded by Aristotle that female deer sought out the leaves of the plant to eat, after giving birth. If true, this observation might indicate medicinal or nutritive properties in the plant preventative of post-partum haemorrhage.

== Description ==
The Mediterranean hartwort usually grows to 20-50 centimeters in height. It has an erect stem that is branched with soft, spreading hairs at the base, and scattered hairs along the rest of the stem. The leaves are softly hairy and pinnate, with the lower leaves being oval with toothed segments, and the upper leaves having linear segments. It has 2-8 primary rays. The marginal flowers each have 1 white petal, enlarged, and uniformly deeply 2-lobed. The bracts and bracteoles are linear long-pointed with spreading hairs. The fruit is round, flattened, elaborately textured, and usually is 5-8 millimeters in size.

== Habitat ==
Mediterranean hartwort is found as a weed of cultivation, on waste land, and by waysides. The plant is equally at home in sandy, loamy and clay soils. Hartworts may be found growing on acid, neutral and basic soils, but will not thrive in shade.

== Reproduction ==
The flowers are hermaphrodite and are pollinated by Insects. The plant is self-fertile.

== Uses ==
The leaves of the plant are edible and are used as a potherb and salad vegetable in Greece. In Italy it is used as a condiment. The essential oil composition of aerial parts of Tordylium apulum L. from Italy was analyzed. Sixty-seven compounds were identified representing 96.5% of the oil. The most abundant compounds were (E)-β-ocimene (17.3), α-humulene (11.4%) and octyl octanoate (8.8%). Essential oil from aerial parts of T. apulum from Greece was reported to have α-humulene (28.7%) and octyl hexanoate (11.7%) as the main constituents. There are no known medicinal uses for this plant.

== In popular culture ==
During the Medieval and Renaissance periods, Tordylium apulum, or hart-wort, was reputed to be the herb associated with the zodiac sign Pisces, and was used in charms & talismans, according to Appendix Four: Fixed Star Rulerships from Cornelius Agrippa, Three Books of Occult Philosophy, Book I, Ch. 32. Appendix 4.
