= Malia (archaeological site) =

Archaeological site in Greece

- 35°17′38″N 25°29′27″E
- Type: Minoan town and "palace"
- Cultures: Minoan, Mycenaean
- Location: Heraklion, Crete, Greece

Site notes
- Excavation dates: 1919-1936, 1964-2012, 2014-present
- Archaeologists: Joseph Hazzidakis, Fernand Chapouthier, Oliver Pelon, Maud Devolder
- Public access: Yes

UNESCO World Heritage Site
- Part of: Minoan Palatial Centres
- Criteria: Cultural: ii, iii, iv, vi
- Reference: 1733-003
- Inscription: 2025 (47th Session)

Malia (also Mallia) is a Minoan and Mycenaean archaeological site located on the northern coast of Crete in the Heraklion area. It is about 35 kilometers east of the ancient site of Knossos and 40 kilometers east of the modern city of Heraklion. The site lies about 3 kilometers east and inland from the modern village of Malia. It was occupied from the middle 3rd millennium BC until about 1250 BC. During the Late Minoan I period (1700 - 1470 BC) it had the third largest Minoan palace, destroyed at the end of the Late Minoan IB period. The other palaces are at Hagia Triada, Knossos, Phaistos, Zakros, and Gournia. It has been excavated for over a century by the French School of Athens and inscriptions of the undeciphered scripts Cretan hieroglyphs, Linear A, and the deciphered script Linear B have been found there.

== History ==
Minoan chronology
Timespan	Period	
3100–2650 BC	EM I	Prepalatial
2650–2200 BC	EM II	Prepalatial
2200–2100 BC	EM III	Prepalatial
2100–1925 BC	MM IA	Prepalatial
1925–1875 BC	MM IB	Protopalatial
1875–1750 BC	MM II	Protopalatial
1750–1700 BC	MM III	Neopalatial
1700–1625 BC	LM IA	Neopalatial
1625–1470 BC	LM IB	Neopalatial
1470–1420 BC	LM II	Postpalatial
1420–1330 BC	LM IIIA	Postpalatial
1330–1200 BC	LM IIIB	Postpalatial
1200–1075 BC	LM IIIC	Postpalatial

The first signs of occupation at Malia, in the form of pottery, occurred in the Early Minoan IIA period (mid-3rd millennium BC). The first firmly dated structures were built in the Early Minoan IIB period. This town was of modest size and was destroyed by fire at the end of EM IIIB. After a time of near or total abandonment occupation resumed minimally in the Protopalatian Middle Minoan IA period. By the Middle Minoan IIB period the town had grown and a sizable mudbrick palace had been constructed. Archaeological finds from the level, including Anatolian obsidian, demonstrate widespread trade was in progress.

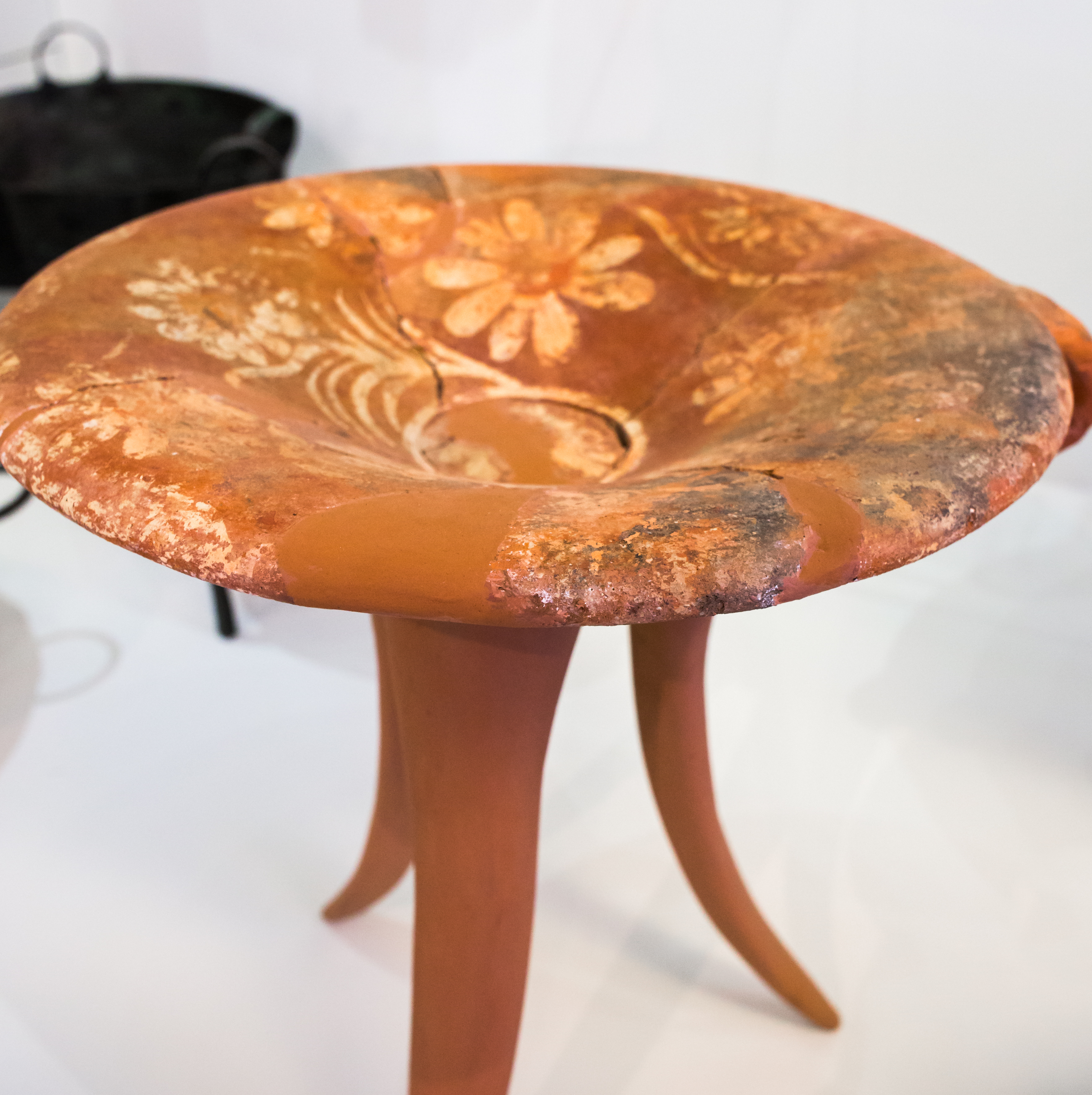
Kamares style one-handled three-legged plate from Malia (Middle Minoan IIB period; 1800-1700 BC) - Heraklion Archaeological Museum

At c. 1700 BC, at the end of the Middle Minoan period, several areas of the town were destroyed. The palace was reconstructed in LM IA and then destroyed by the end of LM IB (c. 1450) and the town is abandoned.

By c. 1450 BC the Mycenaeans have appeared at Malia, along with Linear B, and the town is revitalized. The town was again destroyed, by fire c. 1370 BC. The town was rebuilt and became prosperous, only to be destroyed c. 1250 BC.

A geological investigation found evidence of a modest tsunami, thought to be from the Thera eruption, with a "radiocarbon range of 1744–1544 BC for the secure pre-tsunami context and an interval 1509–1430 BC for the post-event layer".

In 2025, the site was designated as a World Heritage Site by UNESCO.

== Archaeology ==
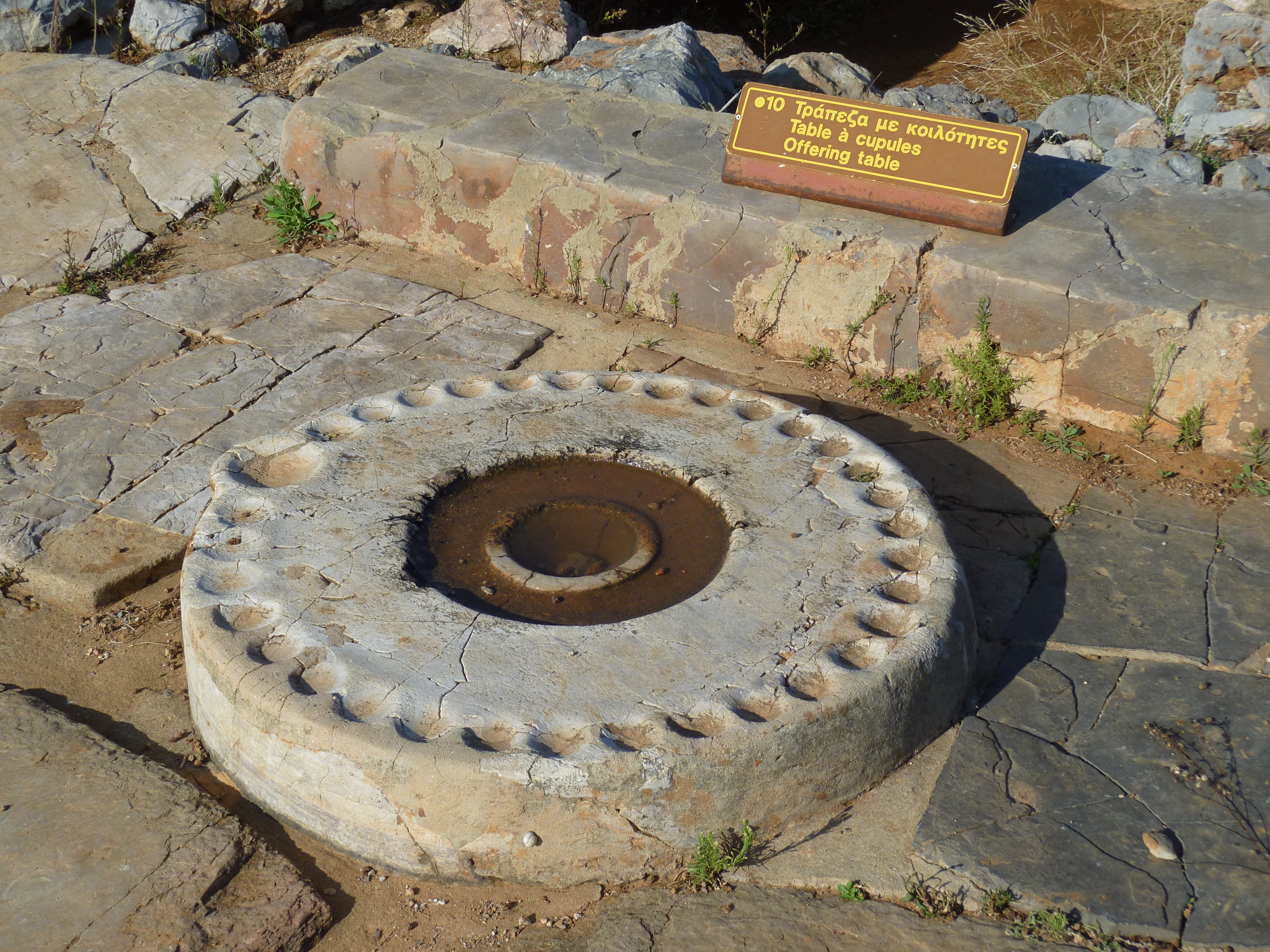
The "offering table" of Kernos at the Malia palace

The site lies about 1200 meters from the coast and 20 meters about the level of the sea, separated from the sea by a marshy area which appears to have maintained that character since Minoan times. There is no harbor.

From 1919 to 1922 the site was explored by Joseph Hazzidakis, the Ephor of Ancient Monuments of Crete, focusing on the Chrysolakkos Building. Finds there included the "honeybees pendant" (Malia Pendant). In 1922 a French School of Athens team led by Fernand Chapouthier began excavations at Malia, continuing until 1936. Work resumed in 1964 under Oliver Pelon and continued until 2012. Work resumed under the direction of Maud Devolder in 2014 with a focus on publication and restoration. In the Late Minoan IB layer an inlay was found with a representation of an Egyptian sphinx, thought to be in the style of the 18th dynasty.

Excavation areas in Malia consist of the palace and a number of "town" areas.

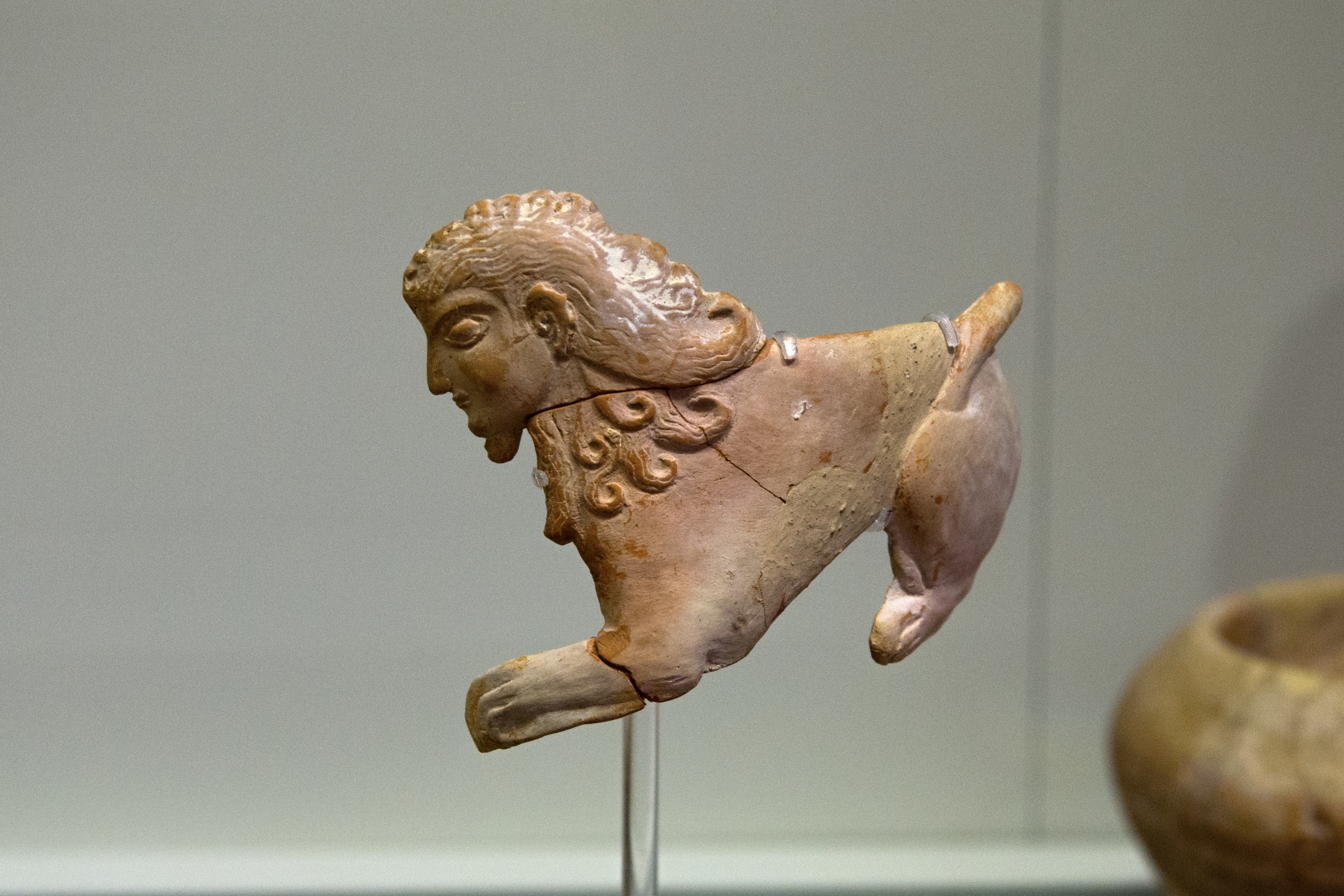
Sphinx, relief ornament, Malia 1800-1700 BC, AMH, 144835

- Palace - The existing Neopalatial palace, constructed of ashlar sandstone and mudbrick, is built on the pre-existing Protopalatial palace that was destroyed in the mudbrick Middle Minoan IIB period and incorporates some of its structures. The palace is built around three courts, Central, North, and Northwest and measured about 80 meters (roughly east-east) by 100 meters (roughly north–south).
- Town - The most prominent town area is Quartier Mu (also known as the Seals Workshop) which lies 200 meters to the northwest of the palace. It dates to MM II and consists of Building A, Building B, and house-workshops. Two hoards of metal tools were found. Hoard A contained a metal drill, knife-razor, saw, axe-adze, and two stone axes while Hoard B contained a metal double axe, adze, punch, drill, and some lithic tools. Another town are is Quartier Nu, dating to LM III, located north of the "Atelier de Sceaux" and north-west of the palace. It consists of three wings around a court and had two architectural phases. There are also the lesser known Quartier Delta and Quartier Pi.

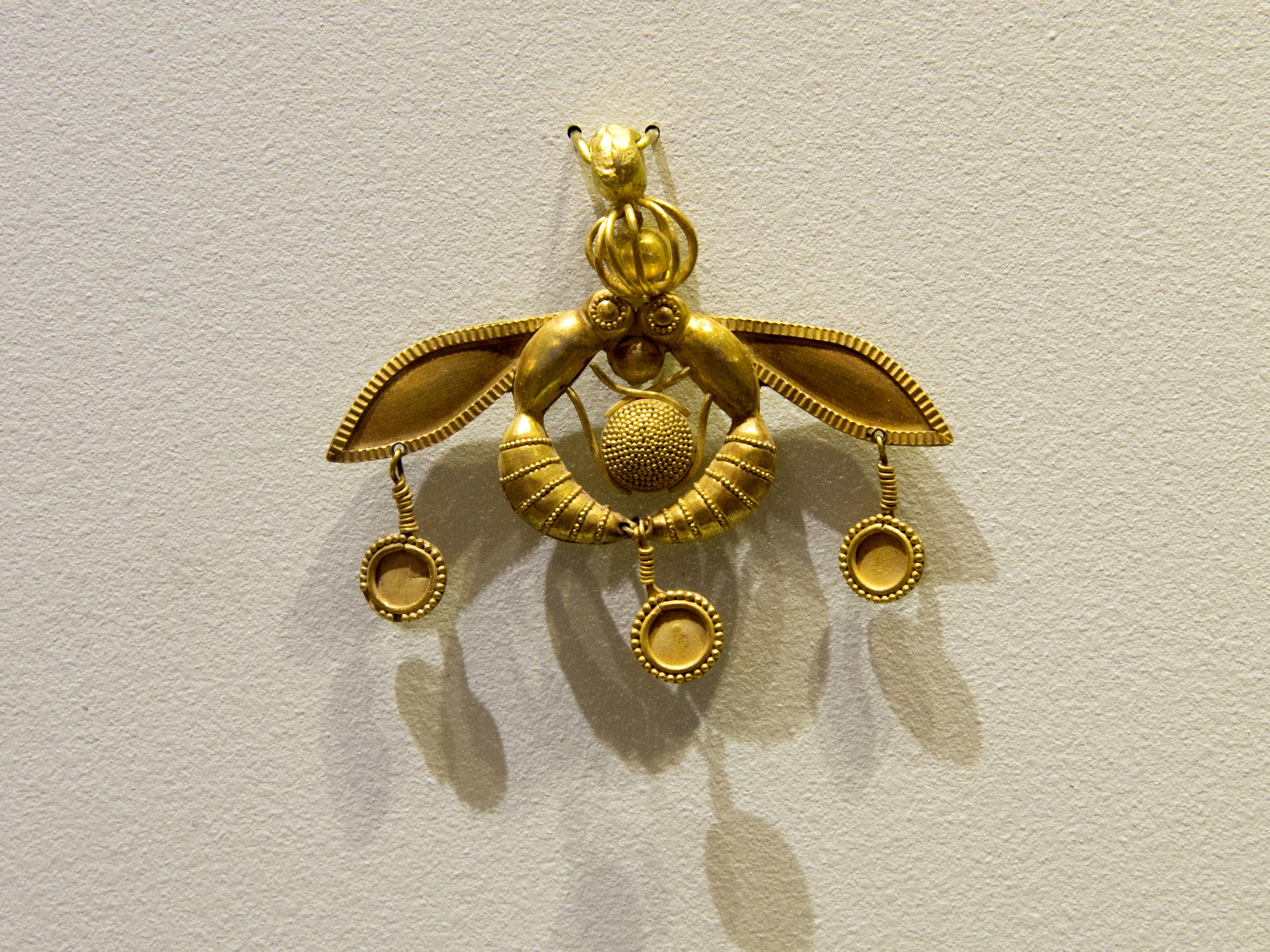
Bee pendant, gold ornament, Chrysolakos necropolis near Malia, 1800-1700 BC, AMH, 144879

- Chryssolakkos/Chrysolakkos - A 30 meter by 39 meter structure, constructed of ashlar blocks and consisting of many small rooms. Its function is unclear though it is often referred to as a necropolis. Its date is also controversial though usually considered to be Middle Minoan IIB. The famous Malia Pendant was found there. Excavated by Demargne, finds included a kernos (speculated to be a libation table) with two rings of cup holders. The outer ring had 29 small and 1 large depressions while the inner ring had 12 small and 1 large depression.

Many of the finds from Malia are held at the Heraklion Archaeological Museum.

=== Epigraphy ===
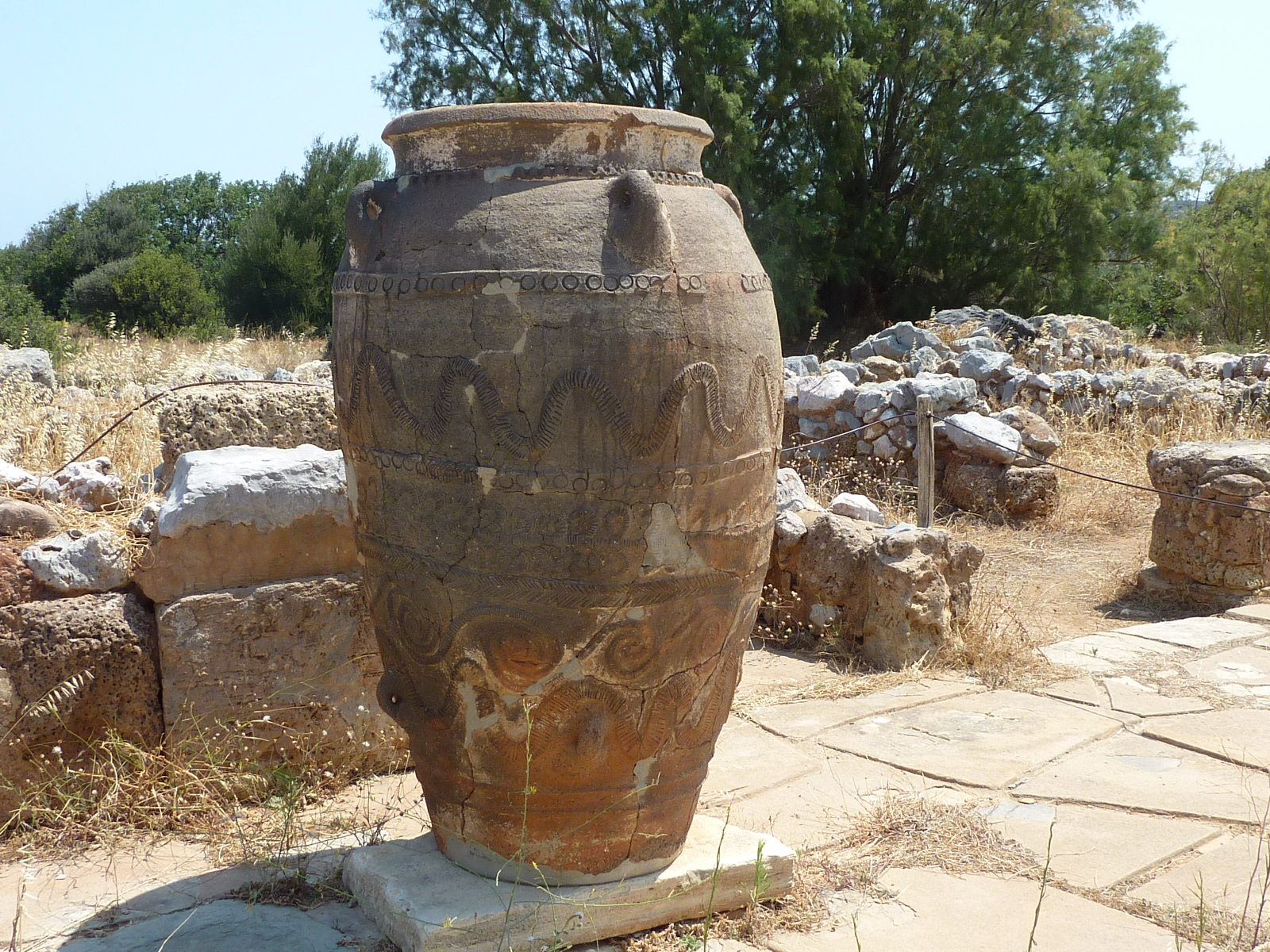
Pithos from Malia

Roundels are clay disks, sealed on the edges, found at Minoan sites. They are thought to have acted as receipts. About 78% of roundels are inscribed, typically with a single Linear A character. Five roundels have been found at Malia. One roundel bore 4 characters in 2 lines on the obverse and the 2 characters and numbers on the reverse. One bore a single character on the obverse. The remaining 3 bore only seals. Six Linear A tablets have also been found at Malia.

At Malia Cretan Hieroglyphic inscriptions have found in the MM IIB Quartier Mu, the MM IIIB Quartier Nu, and the MM IIIB "Depothieroglyphique" in the palace. A stray jar handle fragment with two Cretan Hieroglyphic characters was also found.

Several Linear B inscribed stirrup jars have been found including four in the LM IIIA2B (Mycenae) dated level.

==== Malia altar stone ====
In the 1930s a blue limestone slab with a cuplike cavity was found by a local near Malia. It bore sixteen glyphs, apparently Cretan Hieroglyphs, a very rare example of Cretan Hieroglyphs carved on stone (vs clay or on sealstones). It is listed as item number 328 in the Corpus Hieroglyphicarum Inscriptionum Cretae (CHIC). Its date is unknown though it is usually assumed to be Minoan and its usage is unknown though it has often been assumed to be an offering or altar stone.

== See also ==
- Galatas Palace
- Minoan pottery
- Minoan chronology
- Minoan art
- Minoan religion
- Minoan eruption
- Early and simple domes
